= List of Falcon 9 first-stage boosters =

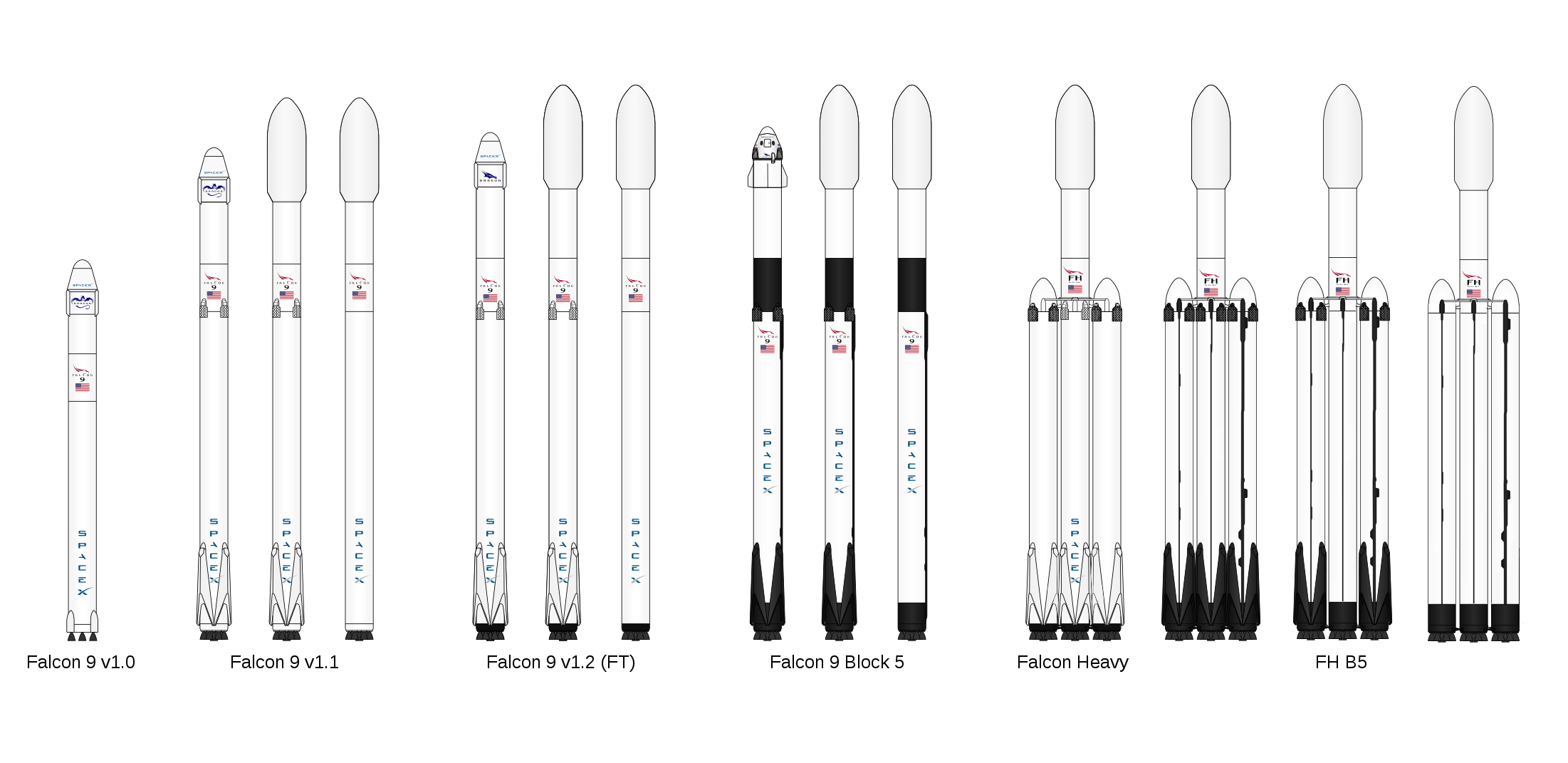
Left to right: Falcon 9 v1.0, v1.1, v1.2 "Full Thrust", Falcon 9 Block 5, Falcon Heavy, and Falcon Heavy Block 5.

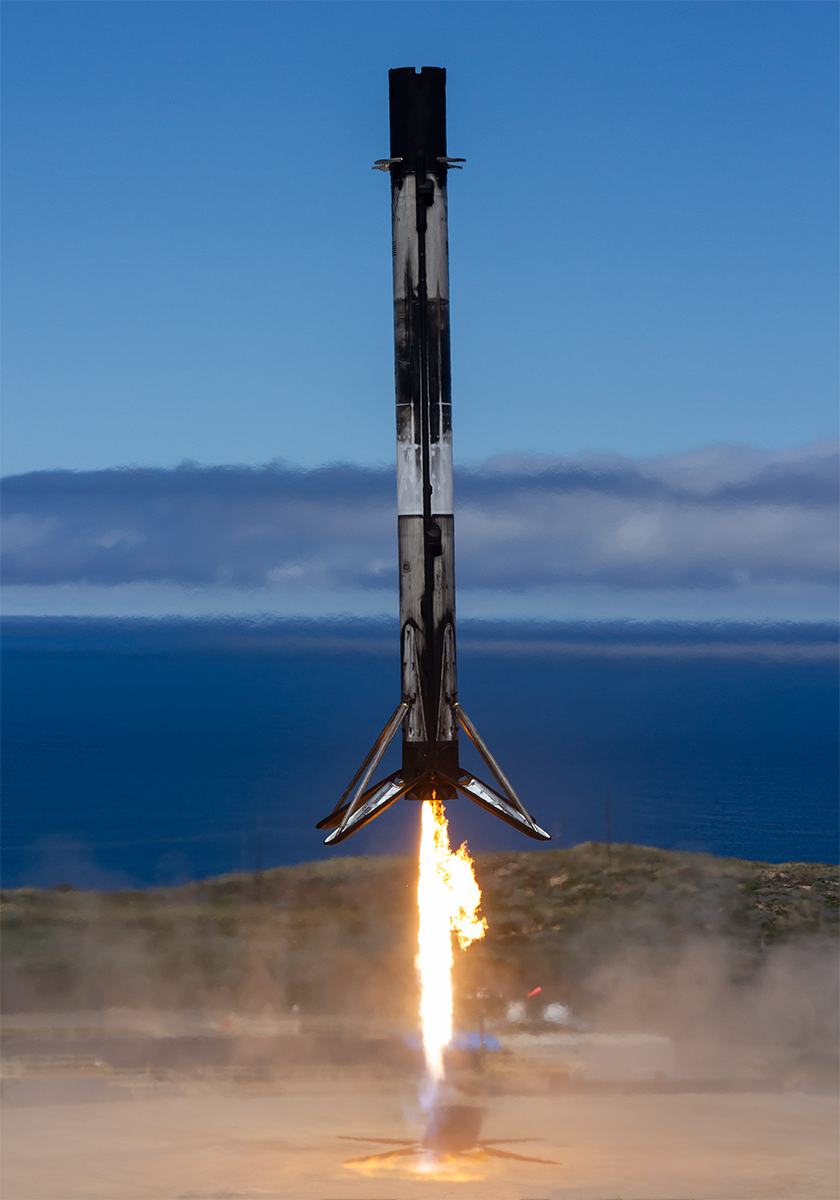
Falcon 9 Block 5 booster B1081 landing at LZ-4 after launching the TRACERS mission on 23 July 2025.

A Falcon 9 first-stage booster is a reusable rocket booster used on the Falcon 9 and Falcon Heavy orbital launch vehicles manufactured by SpaceX. The manufacture of first-stage booster constitutes about 60% of the launch price of a single expended Falcon 9 (and three of them over 80% of the launch price of an expended Falcon Heavy), which led SpaceX to develop a program dedicated to recovery and reuse of these boosters. After multiple attempts, some as early as 2010, at controlling the re-entry of the first stage after its separation from the second stage, the first successful controlled landing of a first stage occurred on December 22, 2015, on the first flight of the Full Thrust version. Since then, Falcon 9 first-stage boosters have been landed and recovered 676 times out of 689 attempts, including synchronized recoveries of the side-boosters of most Falcon Heavy flights.

In total 56 recovered boosters have been refurbished and subsequently flown at least a second time, with a record of 37 launches and landings carried out by a single booster. SpaceX intentionally limited Block 3 and Block 4 boosters to flying only two missions each, but the company indicated in 2018 that they expected the Block 5 versions to achieve at least ten flights, with only minor refurbishment between missions. The ten flight milestone was first achieved by Booster B1051 on the Starlink 27 mission in 2021. The twenty flight milestone was first achieved by Booster B1062 on the Starlink Group 6-49 mission in 2024. The thirty flight milestone was first achieved by Booster B1067 on the Starlink Group 10-11 mission in 2025.

All boosters in Block 4 and earlier have been retired, expended, or lost. The last flight of a Block 4 booster was in June 2018. Since then all boosters in the active fleet are Block 5.

Booster names are a B followed by a four-digit number. The first Falcon 9 version, v1.0, had boosters B0001 to B0007. All following boosters were numbered sequentially starting at B1001, the number 1 standing for first-stage booster.

== List of boosters ==
=== v1.0 and v1.1 ===
SpaceX attempted parachute of the Falcon 9 v1.0 first stage on flights 1 and 2, however on both attempts the boosters disintegrated on re-entry, and the plans were abandoned in favor of propulsive landings. Boosters B0002 (Grasshopper) and B1002 (F9R Dev1) were modified to make short propulsive hops at test sites to demonstrate landing technologies, and were not used on orbital missions. Three boosters successfully made soft ocean touchdowns on orbital flights but were not recovered.

S/N (Note: Exact assignment of boosters B1004–B1009 is not well documented. Sequential numbering according to Jake Meyer's "SpaceX Data" API.)	Version	Launch date (UTC)	Flight No. (Note: Entries with mint colored background denote flights using new boosters.)	Payload (Note: Mission names are presented in parentheses when applicable.)	Launch (pad)	Landing	Fate
B0001	v1.0 test	Manufactured in 2007	—	—N/a	—N/a	—N/a	—N/a
B0002	v1.0 test	September 2012–October 2013 (8 test flights)	—	—N/a	Suborbital	8 test landings achieved	Retired
B0003	v1.0	June 4, 2010	F9-001	Dragon Spacecraft Qualification Unit	Success (SLC‑40)	Failure (parachute)	Destroyed
B0004	v1.0	December 8, 2010	F9-002	COTS Demo Flight 1 (Dragon C101)	Success (SLC‑40)	Failure (parachute)	Destroyed
B0005	v1.0	May 22, 2012	F9-003	COTS Demo Flight 2 (Dragon C102)	Success (SLC‑40)	No attempt	Expended
B0006	v1.0	October 8, 2012	F9-004	CRS-1 (Dragon C103)	Partial success (SLC‑40)	No attempt	Expended
B0007	v1.0	March 1, 2013	F9-005	CRS-2 (Dragon C104)	Success (SLC‑40)	No attempt	Expended
B1001	v1.1 test	Manufactured in 2012	—	—N/a	—N/a	—N/a	—N/a
B1002	v1.1 test	April–August 2014 (5 test flights)	—	—N/a	Suborbital	4 test landings achieved	Destroyed
B1003	v1.1	September 29, 2013	F9-006	CASSIOPE	Success (SLC‑4E)	No attempt	Expended
B1004	v1.1	December 3, 2013	F9-007	SES-8	Success (SLC‑40)	No attempt	Expended
B1005	v1.1	January 6, 2014	F9-008	Thaicom 6	Success (SLC‑40)	No attempt	Expended
B1006	v1.1	April 18, 2014	F9-009	CRS-3 (Dragon C105)	Success (SLC‑40)	No attempt	Expended
B1007	v1.1	July 14, 2014	F9-010	Orbcomm OG2 × 6	Success (SLC‑40)	No attempt	Expended
B1008	v1.1	August 5, 2014	F9-011	AsiaSat 8	Success (SLC‑40)	No attempt	Expended
B1009	v1.1 test	Manufactured in 2014	—	—N/a	—N/a	—N/a	Never completed
B1010	v1.1	September 21, 2014	F9-013	CRS-4 (Dragon C106.1)	Success (SLC‑40)	No attempt	Expended
B1011	v1.1	September 7, 2014	F9-012	AsiaSat 6 / Thaicom 7	Success (SLC‑40)	No attempt	Expended
B1012	v1.1	January 10, 2015	F9-014	CRS-5 (Dragon C107)	Success (SLC‑40)	Failure (JRTI)	Destroyed
B1013	v1.1	February 11, 2015	F9-015	DSCOVR	Success (SLC‑40)	No attempt	Expended
B1014	v1.1	March 2, 2015	F9-016	ABS-3A / Eutelsat 115 West B	Success (SLC‑40)	No attempt	Expended
B1015	v1.1	April 14, 2015	F9-017	CRS-6 (Dragon C108.1)	Success (SLC‑40)	Failure (JRTI)	Destroyed
B1016	v1.1	April 27, 2015	F9-018	TürkmenÄlem 52°E / MonacoSAT	Success (SLC‑40)	No attempt	Expended
B1017	v1.1	January 17, 2016	F9-021	Jason-3	Success (SLC‑4E)	Failure (JRTI)	Destroyed
B1018	v1.1	June 28, 2015	F9-019	CRS-7 (Dragon C109)	Failure (SLC‑40)	Precluded	Destroyed

=== Full Thrust up to Block 4 ===
Falcon 9 Full Thrust (version 1.2 / Block 3) was the first version of the Falcon 9 to successfully land. Changes included a larger fuel tank, uprated engines and supercooled propellant and oxidizer to increase performance. Block 3 and Block 4 are found in this list while the active Block 5 is listed separately. Block 4 was a test version that included new hardware such as titanium grid fins later carried over to the current Block 5. Flights of all Falcon 9 rockets up to Block 4 were limited to 2 flights only, with a total of 14 second flights of these variants. The boosters were either retired or expended after that second launch.

Boosters B1023 and B1025 were originally Falcon 9 boosters which were converted to Falcon Heavy side boosters for the Falcon Heavy test flight.

S/N	Version	Launch date (UTC)	Flight No. (Note: Entries with mint colored background denote flights using new boosters.)	Turnaround	Payload (Note: Mission names are presented in parentheses when applicable.)	Launch (pad)	Landing (location)	Fate
B1019	FT	December 22, 2015	F9-020	—N/a	Orbcomm OG2 × 11	Success (SLC‑40)	Success (LZ‑1)	Retired; On display at SpaceX headquarters
B1020	FT	March 4, 2016	F9-022	—N/a	SES-9	Success (SLC‑40)	Failure (OCISLY)	Destroyed
B1021	FT	April 8, 2016	F9-023	—N/a	CRS-8 (Dragon C110.1)	Success (SLC‑40)	Success (OCISLY)	Retired; On display at Dish Network headquarters
B1021	FT	March 30, 2017	F9-032	356 days	SES-10	Success (LC‑39A)	Success (OCISLY)	Retired; On display at Dish Network headquarters
B1022	FT	May 6, 2016	F9-024	—N/a	JCSAT-14	Success (SLC‑40)	Success (OCISLY)	Retired
B1023	FT	May 27, 2016	F9-025	—N/a	Thaicom 8	Success (SLC‑40)	Success (OCISLY)	Retired; On display at Kennedy Space Center Visitor Complex
B1023	FH side	February 6, 2018	FH-001	620 days	Tesla Roadster	Success (LC‑39A)	Success (LZ‑1)	Retired; On display at Kennedy Space Center Visitor Complex
B1024	FT	June 15, 2016	F9-026	—N/a	ABS-2A / Eutelsat 117 West B	Success (SLC‑40)	Failure (OCISLY)	Destroyed
B1025	FT	July 18, 2016	F9-027	—N/a	CRS-9 (Dragon C111.1)	Success (SLC‑40)	Success (LZ‑1)	Retired
B1025	FH side	February 6, 2018	FH-001	568 days	Tesla Roadster	Success (LC‑39A)	Success (LZ‑2)	Retired
B1026	FT	August 14, 2016	F9-028	—N/a	JCSAT-16	Success (SLC‑40)	Success (OCISLY)	Retired
B1027	FH test	Manufactured in 2016	—	—N/a	—N/a	—N/a	—N/a	—N/a
B1028	FT	September 3, 2016	— (Note: Some sources list this scheduled launch in the total launch count, and list this as the 29th Falcon 9 launch.)	—N/a	AMOS-6	Precluded	Precluded	Destroyed in launch pad explosion
B1029	FT	January 14, 2017	F9-029	—N/a	Iridium NEXT × 10 (NEXT-1)	Success (SLC‑4E)	Success (JRTI)	Retired
B1029	FT	June 23, 2017	F9-036	160 days	BulgariaSat-1	Success (LC‑39A)	Success (OCISLY)	Retired
B1030	FT	March 16, 2017	F9-031	—N/a	EchoStar 23	Success (LC‑39A)	No attempt	Expended
B1031	FT	February 19, 2017	F9-030	—N/a	CRS-10 (Dragon C112.1)	Success (LC‑39A)	Success (LZ‑1)	Retired
B1031	FT	October 11, 2017	F9-043	234 days	SES-11	Success (LC‑39A)	Success (OCISLY)	Retired
B1032	FT	May 1, 2017	F9-033	—N/a	USA-276 (NROL-76)	Success (LC‑39A)	Success (LZ‑1)	Expended
B1032	FT	January 31, 2018	F9-048	275 days	GovSat-1 / SES-16	Success (SLC‑40)	No attempt (Note: Terminated after landing)	Expended
B1033	FH core	February 6, 2018	FH-001	—N/a	Tesla Roadster	Success (LC‑39A)	Failure (OCISLY)	Destroyed
B1034	FT	May 15, 2017	F9-034	—N/a	Inmarsat-5 F4	Success (LC‑39A)	No attempt	Expended
B1035	FT	June 3, 2017	F9-035	—N/a	CRS-11 (Dragon C106.2)	Success (LC‑39A)	Success (LZ‑1)	Retired; On display at Space Center Houston
B1035	FT	December 15, 2017	F9-045	195 days	CRS-13 (Dragon C108.2)	Success (SLC‑40)	Success (LZ‑1)	Retired; On display at Space Center Houston
B1036	FT	June 25, 2017	F9-037	—N/a	Iridium NEXT × 10 (NEXT-2)	Success (SLC‑4E)	Success (JRTI)	Expended
B1036	FT	December 23, 2017	F9-046	181 days	Iridium NEXT × 10 (NEXT-4)	Success (SLC‑4E)	No attempt	Expended
B1037	FT	July 5, 2017	F9-038	—N/a	Intelsat 35e	Success (LC‑39A)	No attempt	Expended
B1038	FT	August 24, 2017	F9-040	—N/a	Formosat-5	Success (SLC‑4E)	Success (JRTI)	Expended
B1038	FT	February 22, 2018	F9-049	182 days	Paz	Success (SLC‑4E)	No attempt	Expended
B1039	F9 B4	August 14, 2017	F9-039	—N/a	CRS-12 (Dragon C113.1)	Success (LC‑39A)	Success (LZ‑1)	Expended
B1039	F9 B4	April 2, 2018	F9-052	231 days	CRS-14 (Dragon C110.2)	Success (SLC‑40)	No attempt	Expended
B1040	F9 B4	September 7, 2017	F9-041	—N/a	Boeing X-37B (OTV-5)	Success (LC‑39A)	Success (LZ‑1)	Expended
B1040	F9 B4	June 4, 2018	F9-056	270 days	SES-12	Success (SLC‑40)	No attempt	Expended
B1041	F9 B4	October 9, 2017	F9-042	—N/a	Iridium NEXT × 10 (NEXT-3)	Success (SLC‑4E)	Success (JRTI)	Expended
B1041	F9 B4	March 30, 2018	F9-051	172 days	Iridium NEXT × 10 (NEXT-5)	Success (SLC‑4E)	No attempt	Expended
B1042	F9 B4	October 30, 2017	F9-044	—N/a	Koreasat 5A	Success (LC‑39A)	Success (OCISLY)	Retired
B1043	F9 B4	January 8, 2018	F9-047	—N/a	Zuma	Success (SLC‑40)	Success (LZ‑1)	Expended
B1043	F9 B4	May 22, 2018	F9-055	134 days	Iridium NEXT × 5 (NEXT-6) / GRACE-FO × 2	Success (SLC‑4E)	No attempt	Expended
B1044	F9 B4	March 6, 2018	F9-050	—N/a	Hispasat 30W-6	Success (SLC‑40)	No attempt	Expended
B1045	F9 B4	April 18, 2018	F9-053	—N/a	TESS	Success (SLC‑40)	Success (OCISLY)	Expended
B1045	F9 B4	June 29, 2018	F9-057	72 days	CRS-15 (Dragon C111.2)	Success (SLC‑40)	No attempt	Expended

=== Block 5 ===
There are three booster types: Falcon 9 (F9), Falcon Heavy core (FH core) boosters, and Falcon Heavy side (FH side) boosters. Falcon 9 and Falcon Heavy side boosters are reconfigurable to each other. A Falcon Heavy core booster is manufactured with structural supports for the side boosters and cannot be converted to Falcon Heavy side booster, although it can be converted to a lower performance Falcon 9 core booster. The interstage mounting hardware was changed after B1056. The newer interstage design features fewer pins holding the interstage on, reducing the amount of work needed to convert a Falcon 9 booster to a Falcon Heavy side booster.

Block 5 is the latest iteration of the Falcon 9 and Falcon Heavy boosters. Changes include a stronger heat shield, upgraded engines, new carbon composite sections (landing legs, engine sections, raceways, RCS thrusters and interstage), retractable landing legs, titanium grid fins, and other additions that simplify refurbishment and allow for easier reusability.

Block 5 boosters were initially certified for 10 launches which was increased to 15. A "deep-dive" examination has been performed on Falcon 9 B1058 and B1060 after their 15th flight, and SpaceX certified Falcon 9 boosters for 20 missions. SpaceX has further increased the Falcon re-flight certification to 40 flights per booster, since 20 flights of some boosters are reached.

B1058, first launched on May 30, 2020 (Crew Dragon Demo-2), was the only booster with NASA logos. On September 11, 2022, during a Starlink mission, it became the first to complete fourteen launches and landings to become the fleet leader. With another 5 Starlink missions, B1058 achieved 15th to 19th launches and landings, the first to do so. B1062 had been the first to achieve 20th to 23rd launches and landings of a booster. Guinness World Records holder with crown decal, B1067, is the current fleet leader after completing 24th to 37th launch & landings, the first to do so. Amongst all B5 boosters, B1071 holds the record for most spacecraft (1147) launched to orbit, while the record for most spacecraft mass launched to orbit by a single booster is held by B1067, i.e., (496,066 kg (1,093,638 lb)). B1063 is currently and of all time, the oldest surviving booster in the Falcon 9 fleet.

As of 1 August 2026, SpaceX has put into service a total of 58 new B5 boosters, of which 34 have been destroyed (25 have been expended, six have been lost due to failed landings, and three have been lost during recovery).

==== Destroyed, expended or lost ====
S/N	Type	Launches	Launch date (UTC)	Flight No. (Note: Entries with mint colored background denote flights using new boosters.)	Turnaround time	Payload (Note: Mission names are presented in parentheses when applicable.)	Launch (pad)	Landing (location)	Fate
B1046	F9 B5	4	May 11, 2018	F9-054	—N/a	Bangabandhu-1	Success (LC‑39A)	Success (OCISLY)	Intentionally destroyed in Crew Dragon In-Flight Abort Test
B1046	F9 B5	4	August 7, 2018	F9-060	88 days	Telkom-4 Merah Putih	Success (SLC‑40)	Success (OCISLY)	Intentionally destroyed in Crew Dragon In-Flight Abort Test
B1046	F9 B5	4	December 3, 2018	F9-064	118 days	SHERPA (SSO-A) (65 Sats)	Success (SLC‑4E)	Success (JRTI)	Intentionally destroyed in Crew Dragon In-Flight Abort Test
B1046	F9 B5	4	January 19, 2020	F9-079	412 days	In-Flight Abort Test (Dragon C205)	Success (LC‑39A)	No attempt	Intentionally destroyed in Crew Dragon In-Flight Abort Test
B1047	F9 B5	3	July 22, 2018	F9-058	—N/a	Telstar 19V	Success (SLC‑40)	Success (OCISLY)	Expended
B1047	F9 B5	3	November 15, 2018	F9-063	116 days	Es'hail 2	Success (LC‑39A)	Success (OCISLY)	Expended
B1047	F9 B5	3	August 6, 2019	F9-074	263 days	AMOS-17	Success (SLC‑40)	No attempt	Expended
B1048	F9 B5	5	July 25, 2018	F9-059	—N/a	Iridium NEXT × 10 (NEXT-7)	Success (SLC‑4E)	Success (JRTI)	Destroyed in landing failure (Note: B1048 had a Merlin engine fail during launch, meaning the engine failed to light up for entry, and the booster crashed.)
B1048	F9 B5	5	October 8, 2018	F9-062	75 days	SAOCOM 1A	Success (SLC‑4E)	Success (LZ‑4)	Destroyed in landing failure
B1048	F9 B5	5	February 22, 2019	F9-068	137 days	Nusantara Satu / Beresheet	Success (SLC‑40)	Success (OCISLY)	Destroyed in landing failure
B1048	F9 B5	5	November 11, 2019	F9-075	262 days	Starlink × 60 (v1.0 L1)	Success (SLC‑40)	Success (OCISLY)	Destroyed in landing failure
B1048	F9 B5	5	March 18, 2020	F9-083	128 days	Starlink × 60 (v1.0 L5)	Success (LC‑39A)	Failure (OCISLY)	Destroyed in landing failure
B1049	F9 B5 (Note: B1049 flew with a Test/Spare Block 4 interstage on its last flight since it donated its interstage to B1052 after its penultimate flight.)	11	September 10, 2018	F9-061	—N/a	Telstar 18V / Apstar 5C	Success (SLC‑40)	Success (OCISLY)	Expended
B1049	F9 B5	11	January 11, 2019	F9-067	123 days	Iridium NEXT × 10 (NEXT-8)	Success (SLC‑4E)	Success (JRTI)	Expended
B1049	F9 B5	11	May 24, 2019	F9-071	133 days	Starlink × 60 (v0.9)	Success (SLC‑40)	Success (OCISLY)	Expended
B1049	F9 B5	11	January 7, 2020	F9-078	228 days	Starlink × 60 (v1.0 L2)	Success (SLC‑40)	Success (OCISLY)	Expended
B1049	F9 B5	11	June 4, 2020	F9-086	149 days	Starlink × 60 (v1.0 L7)	Success (SLC‑40)	Success (JRTI)	Expended
B1049	F9 B5	11	August 18, 2020	F9-091	75 days	Starlink × 58 (v1.0 L10) + Skysat 19-21	Success (SLC‑40)	Success (OCISLY)	Expended
B1049	F9 B5	11	November 25, 2020	F9-100	99 days	Starlink × 60 (v1.0 L15)	Success (SLC‑40)	Success (OCISLY)	Expended
B1049	F9 B5	11	March 4, 2021	F9-109	99 days	Starlink × 60 (v1.0 L17)	Success (LC‑39A)	Success (OCISLY)	Expended
B1049	F9 B5	11	May 4, 2021	F9-116	61 days	Starlink × 60 (v1.0 L25)	Success (LC‑39A)	Success (OCISLY)	Expended
B1049	F9 B5	11	September 14, 2021	F9-125	133 days	Starlink × 51 (Group 2-1)	Success (SLC‑4E)	Success (OCISLY)	Expended
B1049	F9 B5	11	November 23, 2022	F9-186	435 days	Eutelsat 10B	Success (SLC‑40)	No attempt	Expended
B1050	F9 B5	1	December 5, 2018	F9-065	—N/a	CRS-16 (Dragon C112.2)	Success (SLC‑40)	Failure (LZ‑1)	Landing attempt aborted to ocean; scrapped (Note: B1050 landed in the ocean near the coast and was recovered from the water and scrapped for parts.)
B1051	F9 B5	14	March 2, 2019	F9-069	—N/a	Demo-1 (Dragon C204)	Success (LC‑39A)	Success (OCISLY)	Expended
B1051	F9 B5	14	June 12, 2019	F9-072	102 days	RCM × 3	Success (SLC‑4E)	Success (LZ‑4)	Expended
B1051	F9 B5	14	January 29, 2020	F9-080	231 days	Starlink × 60 (v1.0 L3)	Success (SLC‑40)	Success (OCISLY)	Expended
B1051	F9 B5	14	April 22, 2020	F9-084	84 days	Starlink × 60 (v1.0 L6)	Success (LC‑39A)	Success (OCISLY)	Expended
B1051	F9 B5	14	August 7, 2020	F9-090	107 days	Starlink × 57 (v1.0 L9)	Success (LC‑39A)	Success (OCISLY)	Expended
B1051	F9 B5	14	October 18, 2020	F9-095	72 days	Starlink × 60 (v1.0 L13)	Success (LC‑39A)	Success (OCISLY)	Expended
B1051	F9 B5	14	December 13, 2020	F9-102	56 days	SXM 7	Success (SLC‑40)	Success (JRTI)	Expended
B1051	F9 B5	14	January 20, 2021	F9-105	38 days	Starlink × 60 (v1.0 L16)	Success (LC‑39A)	Success (JRTI)	Expended
B1051	F9 B5	14	March 14, 2021	F9-111	53 days	Starlink × 60 (v1.0 L21)	Success (LC‑39A)	Success (OCISLY)	Expended
B1051	F9 B5	14	May 9, 2021	F9-117	56 days	Starlink × 60 (v1.0 L27)	Success (SLC‑40)	Success (JRTI)	Expended
B1051	F9 B5	14	December 18, 2021	F9-132	228 days	Starlink × 52 (Group 4-4)	Success (SLC‑4E)	Success (OCISLY)	Expended
B1051	F9 B5	14	March 19, 2022	F9-145	91 days	Starlink × 53 (Group 4-12)	Success (SLC‑40)	Success (JRTI)	Expended
B1051	F9 B5	14	July 17, 2022	F9-165	120 days	Starlink × 53 (Group 4-22)	Success (SLC‑40)	Success (JRTI)	Expended
B1051	F9 B5	14	November 12, 2022	F9-185	118 days	Galaxy 31 & 32	Success (SLC‑40)	No attempt	Expended
B1052	FH side	8	April 11, 2019	FH-002	—N/a	Arabsat-6A	Success (LC‑39A)	Success (LZ‑1)	Expended
B1052	FH side	8	June 25, 2019	FH-003	75 days	COSMIC-2 (STP-2)	Success (LC‑39A)	Success (LZ‑2)	Expended
B1052	F9 B5 (Note: B1052 used the interstage from B1049 donated after that booster's penultimate flight.)	8	January 31, 2022	F9-138	951 days	CSG-2	Success (SLC‑40)	Success (LZ‑1)	Expended
B1052	F9 B5	8	March 9, 2022	F9-144	37 days	Starlink × 48 (Group 4-10)	Success (SLC‑40)	Success (ASOG)	Expended
B1052	F9 B5	8	May 18, 2022	F9-155	70 days	Starlink × 53 (Group 4-18)	Success (LC‑39A)	Success (ASOG)	Expended
B1052	F9 B5	8	August 4, 2022	F9-168	78 days	Danuri (KPLO)	Success (SLC‑40)	Success (JRTI)	Expended
B1052	F9 B5	8	September 5, 2022	F9-174	32 days	Starlink × 51 (Group 4-20) + Varuna-TDM	Success (SLC‑40)	Success (JRTI)	Expended
B1052	FH side	8	May 1, 2023	FH-006	238 days	ViaSat-3 Americas	Success (LC‑39A)	No attempt	Expended
B1053	FH side	3	April 11, 2019	FH-002	—N/a	Arabsat-6A	Success (LC‑39A)	Success (LZ‑2)	Expended
B1053	FH side	3	June 25, 2019	FH-003	75 days	COSMIC-2 (STP-2)	Success (LC‑39A)	Success (LZ‑1)	Expended
B1053	FH side	3	May 1, 2023	FH-006	1406 days	ViaSat-3 Americas	Success (LC‑39A)	No attempt	Expended
B1054	F9 B5	1	December 23, 2018	F9-066	—N/a	GPS III SV01	Success (SLC‑40)	No attempt	Expended
B1055	FH core	1	April 11, 2019	FH-002	—N/a	Arabsat-6A	Success (LC‑39A)	Success (Note: B1055 landed on Of Course I Still Love You but toppled over during transit back to Port Canaveral in rough seas.) (OCISLY)	Destroyed during recovery
B1056	F9 B5	4	May 4, 2019	F9-070	—N/a	CRS-17 (Dragon C113.2)	Success (SLC‑40)	Success (OCISLY)	Sunk after unintentional water landing
B1056	F9 B5	4	July 25, 2019	F9-073	82 days	CRS-18 (Dragon C108.3)	Success (SLC‑40)	Success (LZ‑1)	Sunk after unintentional water landing
B1056	F9 B5	4	December 17, 2019	F9-077	146 days	JCSAT-18 / Kacific-1	Success (SLC‑40)	Success (OCISLY)	Sunk after unintentional water landing
B1056	F9 B5	4	February 17, 2020	F9-081	62 days	Starlink × 60 (v1.0 L4)	Success (SLC‑40)	Failure (OCISLY)	Sunk after unintentional water landing
B1057	FH core	1	June 25, 2019	FH-003	—N/a	COSMIC-2 (STP-2)	Success (LC‑39A)	Failure (OCISLY)	Destroyed in landing failure
B1058	F9 B5	19	May 30, 2020	F9-085	—N/a	Demo-2 (Dragon C206‑1 Endeavour)	Success (LC‑39A)	Success (OCISLY)	Destroyed during recovery (Note: B1058 landed on Just Read the Instructions but toppled over during transit back to Port Canaveral in rough seas.)
B1058	F9 B5	19	July 20, 2020	F9-089	51 days	ANASIS-II	Success (SLC‑40)	Success (JRTI)	Destroyed during recovery
B1058	F9 B5	19	October 6, 2020	F9-094	78 days	Starlink × 60 (v1.0 L12)	Success (LC‑39A)	Success (OCISLY)	Destroyed during recovery
B1058	F9 B5	19	December 6, 2020	F9-101	60 days	CRS-21 (Dragon C208‑1)	Success (LC‑39A)	Success (OCISLY)	Destroyed during recovery
B1058	F9 B5	19	January 24, 2021	F9-106	49 days	Transporter-1 (143 Sats)	Success (SLC‑40)	Success (OCISLY)	Destroyed during recovery
B1058	F9 B5	19	March 11, 2021	F9-110	46 days	Starlink × 60 (v1.0 L20)	Success (SLC‑40)	Success (JRTI)	Destroyed during recovery
B1058	F9 B5	19	April 7, 2021	F9-113	27 days	Starlink × 60 (v1.0 L23)	Success (SLC‑40)	Success (OCISLY)	Destroyed during recovery
B1058	F9 B5	19	May 15, 2021	F9-118	38 days	Starlink × 52 (v1.0 L26) + Rideshare	Success (LC‑39A)	Success (OCISLY)	Destroyed during recovery
B1058	F9 B5	19	November 13, 2021	F9-128	182 days	Starlink × 53 (Group 4-1)	Success (SLC‑40)	Success (JRTI)	Destroyed during recovery
B1058	F9 B5	19	January 13, 2022	F9-136	61 days	Transporter-3 (105 Sats)	Success (SLC‑40)	Success (LZ‑1)	Destroyed during recovery
B1058	F9 B5	19	February 21, 2022	F9-141	39 days	Starlink × 46 (Group 4-8)	Success (SLC‑40)	Success (ASOG)	Destroyed during recovery
B1058	F9 B5	19	May 6, 2022	F9-152	73 days	Starlink × 53 (Group 4-17)	Success (LC‑39A)	Success (ASOG)	Destroyed during recovery
B1058	F9 B5	19	July 7, 2022	F9-162	62 days	Starlink × 53 (Group 4-21)	Success (SLC‑40)	Success (JRTI)	Destroyed during recovery
B1058	F9 B5	19	September 11, 2022	F9-175	66 days	Starlink × 34 (Group 4-2) + BlueWalker 3	Success (LC‑39A)	Success (ASOG)	Destroyed during recovery
B1058	F9 B5	19	December 17, 2022	F9-192	97 days	Starlink × 54 (Group 4-37)	Success (LC‑39A)	Success (JRTI)	Destroyed during recovery
B1058	F9 B5	19	July 10, 2023	F9-238	205 days	Starlink v2 × 22 (Group 6-5)	Success (SLC‑40)	Success (JRTI)	Destroyed during recovery
B1058	F9 B5	19	September 20, 2023	F9-257	72 days	Starlink v2 × 22 (Group 6-17)	Success (SLC‑40)	Success (ASOG)	Destroyed during recovery
B1058	F9 B5	19	November 4, 2023	F9-269	45 days	Starlink v2 × 23 (Group 6-26)	Success (SLC‑40)	Success (ASOG)	Destroyed during recovery
B1058	F9 B5	19	December 23, 2023	F9-283	49 days	Starlink v2 × 23 (Group 6-32)	Success (SLC‑40)	Success (JRTI)	Destroyed during recovery
B1059	F9 B5	6	December 5, 2019	F9-076	—N/a	CRS-19 (Dragon C106.3)	Success (SLC‑40)	Success (OCISLY)	Destroyed in landing failure (Note: B1059 had a hole in one of its "boots" (protective thermal blankets), which led to one of the engines catching fire and shutting down during re-entry and the booster impacted the ocean.)
B1059	F9 B5	6	March 7, 2020	F9-082	93 days	CRS-20 (Dragon C112.3)	Success (SLC‑40)	Success (LZ‑1)	Destroyed in landing failure
B1059	F9 B5	6	June 13, 2020	F9-087	98 days	Starlink × 58 (v1.0 L8)+ Skysat 16–18	Success (SLC‑40)	Success (OCISLY)	Destroyed in landing failure
B1059	F9 B5	6	August 30, 2020	F9-092	78 days	SAOCOM 1B+ Rideshare	Success (SLC‑40)	Success (LZ‑1)	Destroyed in landing failure
B1059	F9 B5	6	December 19, 2020	F9-103	111 days	NROL-108	Success (LC‑39A)	Success (LZ‑1)	Destroyed in landing failure
B1059	F9 B5	6	February 16, 2021	F9-108	59 days	Starlink × 60 (v1.0 L19)	Success (SLC‑40)	Failure (OCISLY)	Destroyed in landing failure
B1060	F9 B5	20	June 30, 2020	F9-088	—N/a	GPS III SV03	Success (SLC‑40)	Success (JRTI)	Expended
B1060	F9 B5	20	September 3, 2020	F9-093	65 days	Starlink × 60 (v1.0 L11)	Success (LC‑39A)	Success (OCISLY)	Expended
B1060	F9 B5	20	October 24, 2020	F9-096	51 days	Starlink × 60 (v1.0 L14)	Success (SLC‑40)	Success (JRTI)	Expended
B1060	F9 B5	20	January 8, 2021	F9-104	76 days	Türksat 5A	Success (SLC‑40)	Success (JRTI)	Expended
B1060	F9 B5	20	February 4, 2021	F9-107	27 days	Starlink × 60 (v1.0 L18)	Success (SLC‑40)	Success (OCISLY)	Expended
B1060	F9 B5	20	March 24, 2021	F9-112	48 days	Starlink × 60 (v1.0 L22)	Success (SLC‑40)	Success (OCISLY)	Expended
B1060	F9 B5	20	April 29, 2021	F9-115	36 days	Starlink × 60 (v1.0 L24)	Success (SLC‑40)	Success (JRTI)	Expended
B1060	F9 B5	20	June 30, 2021	F9-123	62 days	Transporter-2 (88 Sats)	Success (SLC‑40)	Success (LZ‑1)	Expended
B1060	F9 B5	20	December 2, 2021	F9-130	155 days	Starlink × 48 (Group 4-3) + BlackSky Global 12–13	Success (SLC‑40)	Success (ASOG)	Expended
B1060	F9 B5	20	January 19, 2022	F9-137	48 days	Starlink × 49 (Group 4-6)	Success (LC‑39A)	Success (ASOG)	Expended
B1060	F9 B5	20	March 3, 2022	F9-143	43 days	Starlink × 47 (Group 4-9)	Success (LC‑39A)	Success (JRTI)	Expended
B1060	F9 B5	20	April 21, 2022	F9-149	49 days	Starlink × 53 (Group 4-14)	Success (SLC‑40)	Success (JRTI)	Expended
B1060	F9 B5	20	June 17, 2022	F9-158	57 days	Starlink × 53 (Group 4-19)	Success (LC‑39A)	Success (ASOG)	Expended
B1060	F9 B5	20	October 8, 2022	F9-180	113 days	Galaxy 33 & 34	Success (SLC‑40)	Success (ASOG)	Expended
B1060	F9 B5	20	January 3, 2023	F9-195	87 days	Transporter-6 (144 Sats)	Success (SLC‑40)	Success (LZ‑1)	Expended
B1060	F9 B5	20	July 16, 2023	F9-239	194 days	Starlink × 54 (Group 5-15)	Success (SLC‑40)	Success (ASOG)	Expended
B1060	F9 B5	20	September 24, 2023	F9-258	70 days	Starlink v2 × 22 (Group 6-18)	Success (SLC‑40)	Success (JRTI)	Expended
B1060	F9 B5	20	February 15, 2024	F9-299	144 days	IM-1 (Nova-C) Odysseus lander	Success (LC‑39A)	Success (LZ‑1)	Expended
B1060	F9 B5	20	March 24, 2024	F9-313	38 days	Starlink v2 × 23 (Group 6-42)	Success (LC‑39A)	Success (JRTI)	Expended
B1060	F9 B5	20	April 28, 2024	F9-327	35 days	Galileo FOC FM25 & FOC FM27	Success (LC‑39A)	No attempt	Expended
B1061	F9 B5	23	November 16, 2020	F9-098	—N/a	Crew-1 (Dragon C207‑1 Resilience)	Success (LC‑39A)	Success (JRTI)	Expended
B1061	F9 B5	23	April 23, 2021	F9-114	158 days	Crew-2 (Dragon C206‑2 Endeavour)	Success (LC‑39A)	Success (OCISLY)	Expended
B1061	F9 B5	23	June 6, 2021	F9-121	44 days	SXM-8	Success (SLC‑40)	Success (JRTI)	Expended
B1061	F9 B5	23	August 29, 2021	F9-124	84 days	CRS-23 (Dragon C208‑2)	Success (LC‑39A)	Success (ASOG)	Expended
B1061	F9 B5	23	December 9, 2021	F9-131	102 days	IXPE	Success (LC‑39A)	Success (JRTI)	Expended
B1061	F9 B5	23	February 3, 2022	F9-140	56 days	Starlink × 49 (Group 4-7)	Success (LC‑39A)	Success (ASOG)	Expended
B1061	F9 B5	23	April 1, 2022	F9-146	57 days	Transporter-4 (40 Sats)	Success (SLC‑40)	Success (JRTI)	Expended
B1061	F9 B5	23	May 25, 2022	F9-156	54 days	Transporter-5 (59 Sats)	Success (SLC‑40)	Success (LZ‑1)	Expended
B1061	F9 B5	23	June 19, 2022	F9-160	25 days	Globalstar FM15+ Rideshare	Success (SLC‑40)	Success (JRTI)	Expended
B1061	F9 B5	23	August 12, 2022	F9-170	54 days	Starlink × 46 (Group 3-3)	Success (SLC‑4E)	Success (OCISLY)	Expended
B1061	F9 B5	23	December 30, 2022	F9-194	140 days	EROS-C3	Success (SLC‑4E)	Success (LZ‑4)	Expended
B1061	F9 B5	23	March 3, 2023	F9-208	63 days	Starlink × 51 (Group 2-7)	Success (SLC‑4E)	Success (OCISLY)	Expended
B1061	F9 B5	23	April 27, 2023	F9-219	55 days	Starlink × 46 (Group 3-5)	Success (SLC‑4E)	Success (OCISLY)	Expended
B1061	F9 B5	23	May 31, 2023	F9-228	34 days	Starlink × 52 (Group 2-10)	Success (SLC‑4E)	Success (OCISLY)	Expended
B1061	F9 B5	23	August 22, 2023	F9-248	83 days	Starlink v2 × 21 (Group 7-1)	Success (SLC‑4E)	Success (OCISLY)	Expended
B1061	F9 B5	23	October 21, 2023	F9-265	60 days	Starlink v2 × 21 (Group 7-5)	Success (SLC‑4E)	Success (OCISLY)	Expended
B1061	F9 B5	23	December 1, 2023	F9-278	41 days	425 Project Flight 1	Success (SLC‑4E)	Success (LZ‑4)	Expended
B1061	F9 B5	23	January 14, 2024	F9-289	44 days	Starlink v2 × 22 (Group 7-10)	Success (SLC‑4E)	Success (OCISLY)	Expended
B1061	F9 B5	23	February 23, 2024	F9-302	40 days	Starlink v2 × 22 (Group 7-15)	Success (SLC‑4E)	Success (OCISLY)	Expended
B1061	F9 B5	23	May 2, 2024	F9-329	69 days	WorldView Legion 1 & 2	Success (SLC‑4E)	Success (LZ‑4)	Expended
B1061	F9 B5	23	June 8, 2024	F9-345	37 days	Starlink v2 × 20 (Group 8-8)	Success (SLC‑4E)	Success (OCISLY)	Expended
B1061	F9 B5	23	August 12, 2024	F9-362	65 days	ASBM × 2	Success (SLC‑4E)	Success (OCISLY)	Expended
B1061	F9 B5	23	October 7, 2024	F9-379	56 days	Hera	Success (SLC‑40)	No attempt	Expended
B1062	F9 B5	23	November 5, 2020	F9-097	—N/a	GPS III SV04	Success (SLC‑40)	Success (OCISLY)	Destroyed in landing failure
B1062	F9 B5	23	June 17, 2021	F9-122	224 days	GPS III SV05	Success (SLC‑40)	Success (JRTI)	Destroyed in landing failure
B1062	F9 B5	23	September 16, 2021	F9-126	91 days	Inspiration4 (Dragon C207‑2 Resilience)	Success (LC‑39A)	Success (JRTI)	Destroyed in landing failure
B1062	F9 B5	23	January 6, 2022	F9-135	112 days	Starlink × 49 (Group 4-5)	Success (LC‑39A)	Success (ASOG)	Destroyed in landing failure
B1062	F9 B5	23	April 8, 2022	F9-147	92 days	Ax-1 (Dragon C206‑2 Endeavour)	Success (LC‑39A)	Success (ASOG)	Destroyed in landing failure
B1062	F9 B5	23	April 29, 2022	F9-151	21 days	Starlink × 53 (Group 4-16)	Success (SLC‑40)	Success (JRTI)	Destroyed in landing failure
B1062	F9 B5	23	June 8, 2022	F9-157	40 days	Nilesat-301	Success (SLC‑40)	Success (JRTI)	Destroyed in landing failure
B1062	F9 B5	23	July 24, 2022	F9-167	46 days	Starlink × 53 (Group 4-25)	Success (LC‑39A)	Success (ASOG)	Destroyed in landing failure
B1062	F9 B5	23	August 19, 2022	F9-171	26 days	Starlink × 53 (Group 4-27)	Success (SLC‑40)	Success (ASOG)	Destroyed in landing failure
B1062	F9 B5	23	October 20, 2022	F9-182	62 days	Starlink × 54 (Group 4-36)	Success (SLC‑40)	Success (ASOG)	Destroyed in landing failure
B1062	F9 B5	23	December 28, 2022	F9-193	69 days	Starlink × 54 (Group 5-1)	Success (SLC‑40)	Success (ASOG)	Destroyed in landing failure
B1062	F9 B5	23	February 12, 2023	F9-203	46 days	Starlink × 55 (Group 5-4)	Success (SLC‑40)	Success (ASOG)	Destroyed in landing failure
B1062	F9 B5	23	March 9, 2023	F9-209	25 days	OneWeb #17	Success (SLC‑40)	Success (LZ‑1)	Destroyed in landing failure
B1062	F9 B5	23	May 27, 2023	F9-227	79 days	ArabSat 7B (Badr-8)	Success (SLC‑40)	Success (JRTI)	Destroyed in landing failure
B1062	F9 B5	23	July 28, 2023	F9-242	62 days	Starlink v2 × 22 (Group 6-7)	Success (SLC‑40)	Success (ASOG)	Destroyed in landing failure
B1062	F9 B5	23	October 18, 2023	F9-264	82 days	Starlink v2 × 22 (Group 6-23)	Success (SLC‑40)	Success (JRTI)	Destroyed in landing failure
B1062	F9 B5	23	November 28, 2023	F9-277	41 days	Starlink v2 × 23 (Group 6-30)	Success (SLC‑40)	Success (JRTI)	Destroyed in landing failure
B1062	F9 B5	23	January 29, 2024	F9-293	62 days	Starlink v2 × 23 (Group 6-38)	Success (LC‑39A)	Success (ASOG)	Destroyed in landing failure
B1062	F9 B5	23	March 16, 2024	F9-310	47 days	Starlink v2 × 23 (Group 6-44)	Success (LC‑39A)	Success (ASOG)	Destroyed in landing failure
B1062	F9 B5	23	April 13, 2024	F9-323	28 days	Starlink v2 × 23 (Group 6-49)	Success (SLC‑40)	Success (ASOG)	Destroyed in landing failure
B1062	F9 B5	23	May 18, 2024	F9-336	35 days	Starlink v2 × 23 (Group 6-59)	Success (SLC‑40)	Success (ASOG)	Destroyed in landing failure
B1062	F9 B5	23	June 27, 2024	F9-350	40 days	Starlink v2 × 23 (Group 10-3)	Success (SLC‑40)	Success (JRTI)	Destroyed in landing failure
B1062	F9 B5	23	August 28, 2024	F9-367	62 days	Starlink v2 × 21 (Group 8-6)	Success (SLC‑40)	Failure (ASOG)	Destroyed in landing failure
B1064	FH side	6	November 1, 2022	FH-004	—N/a	USSF-44	Success (LC‑39A)	Success (LZ‑1)	Expended
B1064	FH side	6	January 15, 2023	FH-005	75 days	USSF-67	Success (LC‑39A)	Success (LZ‑2)	Expended
B1064	FH side	6	July 29, 2023	FH-007	195 days	Jupiter-3 (EchoStar-24)	Success (LC‑39A)	Success (LZ‑1)	Expended
B1064	FH side	6	October 13, 2023	FH-008	76 days	Psyche	Success (LC‑39A)	Success (LZ‑1)	Expended
B1064	FH side	6	December 29, 2023	FH-009	77 days	USSF-52 (Boeing X-37B OTV-7)	Success (LC‑39A)	Success (LZ‑1)	Expended
B1064	FH side	6	October 14, 2024	FH-011	290 days	Europa Clipper	Success (LC‑39A)	No attempt	Expended
B1065	FH side	6	November 1, 2022	FH-004	—N/a	USSF-44	Success (LC‑39A)	Success (LZ‑2)	Expended
B1065	FH side	6	January 15, 2023	FH-005	75 days	USSF-67	Success (LC‑39A)	Success (LZ‑1)	Expended
B1065	FH side	6	July 29, 2023	FH-007	195 days	Jupiter-3 (EchoStar-24)	Success (LC‑39A)	Success (LZ‑2)	Expended
B1065	FH side	6	October 13, 2023	FH-008	76 days	Psyche	Success (LC‑39A)	Success (LZ‑2)	Expended
B1065	FH side	6	December 29, 2023	FH-009	77 days	USSF-52 (Boeing X-37B OTV-7)	Success (LC‑39A)	Success (LZ‑2)	Expended
B1065	FH side	6	October 14, 2024	FH-011	290 days	Europa Clipper	Success (LC‑39A)	No attempt	Expended
B1066	FH core	1	November 1, 2022	FH-004	—N/a	USSF-44	Success (LC‑39A)	No attempt	Expended
B1068	FH core	1	May 1, 2023	FH-006	—N/a	ViaSat-3 Americas	Success (LC‑39A)	No attempt	Expended
B1069	F9 B5	32	December 21, 2021	F9-134	—N/a	CRS-24 (Dragon C209‑2)	Success (LC‑39A)	Success (JRTI)	Expended
B1069	F9 B5	32	August 28, 2022	F9-172	250 days	Starlink × 54 (Group 4-23)	Success (SLC‑40)	Success (ASOG)	Expended
B1069	F9 B5	32	October 15, 2022	F9-181	48 days	Hotbird 13F	Success (SLC‑40)	Success (JRTI)	Expended
B1069	F9 B5	32	December 8, 2022	F9-188	54 days	OneWeb #15	Success (LC‑39A)	Success (LZ‑1)	Expended
B1069	F9 B5	32	February 2, 2023	F9-201	56 days	Starlink × 53 (Group 5-3)	Success (LC‑39A)	Success (ASOG)	Expended
B1069	F9 B5	32	March 17, 2023	F9-212	43 days	SES-18 & 19	Success (SLC‑40)	Success (JRTI)	Expended
B1069	F9 B5	32	May 4, 2023	F9-221	48 days	Starlink × 56 (Group 5-6)	Success (SLC‑40)	Success (ASOG)	Expended
B1069	F9 B5	32	June 23, 2023	F9-235	50 days	Starlink × 56 (Group 5-12)	Success (SLC‑40)	Success (JRTI)	Expended
B1069	F9 B5	32	August 11, 2023	F9-246	49 days	Starlink v2 × 22 (Group 6-9)	Success (SLC‑40)	Success (JRTI)	Expended
B1069	F9 B5	32	September 30, 2023	F9-260	50 days	Starlink v2 × 22 (Group 6-19)	Success (SLC‑40)	Success (ASOG)	Expended
B1069	F9 B5	32	November 18, 2023	F9-274	49 days	Starlink v2 × 23 (Group 6-28)	Success (SLC‑40)	Success (JRTI)	Expended
B1069	F9 B5	32	December 29, 2023	F9-285	41 days	Starlink v2 × 23 (Group 6-36)	Success (SLC‑40)	Success (ASOG)	Expended
B1069	F9 B5	32	February 25, 2024	F9-303	58 days	Starlink v2 × 24 (Group 6-39)	Success (SLC‑40)	Success (ASOG)	Expended
B1069	F9 B5	32	April 5, 2024	F9-318	40 days	Starlink v2 × 23 (Group 6-47)	Success (SLC‑40)	Success (ASOG)	Expended
B1069	F9 B5	32	May 6, 2024	F9-331	31 days	Starlink v2 × 23 (Group 6-57)	Success (SLC‑40)	Success (JRTI)	Expended
B1069	F9 B5	32	June 8, 2024	F9-344	33 days	Starlink v2 × 22 (Group 10-1)	Success (SLC‑40)	Success (ASOG)	Expended
B1069	F9 B5	32	July 27, 2024	F9-355	49 days	Starlink v2 × 23 (Group 10-9)	Success (LC‑39A)	Success (JRTI)	Expended
B1069	F9 B5	32	August 31, 2024	F9-368	35 days	Starlink v2 × 21 (Group 8-10)	Success (SLC‑40)	Success (JRTI)	Expended
B1069	F9 B5	32	October 26, 2024	F9-386	56 days	Starlink v2 × 22 (Group 10-8)	Success (SLC‑40)	Success (JRTI)	Expended
B1069	F9 B5	32	November 21, 2024	F9-399	26 days	Starlink v2 × 24 (Group 6-66)	Success (SLC‑40)	Success (ASOG)	Expended
B1069	F9 B5	32	February 4, 2025	F9-432	75 days	Starlink v2 × 21 (Group 12-3)	Success (SLC‑40)	Success (JRTI)	Expended
B1069	F9 B5	32	March 13, 2025	F9-445	37 days	Starlink v2 × 21 (Group 12-21)	Success (SLC‑40)	Success (ASOG)	Expended
B1069	F9 B5	32	April 25, 2025	F9-464	43 days	Starlink v2 × 28 (Group 6-74)	Success (SLC‑40)	Success (ASOG)	Expended
B1069	F9 B5	32	May 24, 2025	F9-479	29 days	Starlink v2 × 23 (Group 12-22)	Success (SLC‑40)	Success (ASOG)	Expended
B1069	F9 B5	32	June 23, 2025	F9-493	30 days	Starlink v2 × 27 (Group 10-23)	Success (SLC‑40)	Success (ASOG)	Expended
B1069	F9 B5	32	July 30, 2025	F9-510	37 days	Starlink x 28 (Group 10-29)	Success (SLC‑40)	Success (JRTI)	Expended
B1069	F9 B5	32	September 5, 2025	F9-528	37 days	Starlink x 28 (Group 10-57)	Success (LC‑39A)	Success (JRTI)	Expended
B1069	F9 B5	32	November 9, 2025	F9-560	65 days	Starlink x 29 (Group 10-51)	Success (LC‑39A)	Success (ASOG)	Expended
B1069	F9 B5	32	January 9, 2026	F9-585	61 days	Starlink x 29 (Group 6-96)	Success (SLC‑40)	Success (ASOG)	Expended
B1069	F9 B5	32	February 27, 2026	F9-607	49 days	Starlink x 29 (Group 6-108)	Success (SLC‑40)	Success (ASOG)	Expended
B1069	F9 B5	32	May 1, 2026	F9-634	63 days	Starlink x 29 (Group 10-38)	Success (SLC‑40)	Success (ASOG)	Expended
B1069	F9 B5	32	July 21, 2026	F9-668	81 days	Mission Robotic Vehicle (MRV-1)	Success (SLC‑40)	No attempt	Expended
B1070	FH core	1	January 15, 2023	FH-005	—N/a	USSF-67	Success (LC‑39A)	No attempt	Expended
B1073	F9 B5	21	May 14, 2022	F9-154	—N/a	Starlink × 53 (Group 4-15)	Success (SLC‑40)	Success (JRTI)	Expended
B1073	F9 B5	21	June 29, 2022	F9-161	46 days	SES-22	Success (SLC‑40)	Success (ASOG)	Expended
B1073	F9 B5	21	August 10, 2022	F9-169	42 days	Starlink × 52 (Group 4-26)	Success (LC‑39A)	Success (ASOG)	Expended
B1073	F9 B5	21	September 24, 2022	F9-177	45 days	Starlink × 52 (Group 4-35)	Success (SLC‑40)	Success (ASOG)	Expended
B1073	F9 B5	21	December 11, 2022	F9-189	78 days	HAKUTO-R Mission 1	Success (SLC‑40)	Success (LZ‑2)	Expended
B1073	F9 B5	21	February 7, 2023	F9-202	58 days	Amazonas Nexus	Success (SLC‑40)	Success (JRTI)	Expended
B1073	F9 B5	21	March 15, 2023	F9-210	36 days	CRS-27 (Dragon C209‑3)	Success (LC‑39A)	Success (ASOG)	Expended
B1073	F9 B5	21	April 19, 2023	F9-218	35 days	Starlink v2 × 21 (Group 6-2)	Success (SLC‑40)	Success (ASOG)	Expended
B1073	F9 B5	21	June 12, 2023	F9-231	54 days	Starlink × 52 (Group 5-11)	Success (SLC‑40)	Success (JRTI)	Expended
B1073	F9 B5	21	September 4, 2023	F9-253	84 days	Starlink v2 × 21 (Group 6-12)	Success (LC‑39A)	Success (JRTI)	Expended
B1073	F9 B5	21	November 8, 2023	F9-270	65 days	Starlink v2 × 23 (Group 6-27)	Success (SLC‑40)	Success (JRTI)	Expended
B1073	F9 B5	21	January 15, 2024	F9-290	68 days	Starlink v2 × 23 (Group 6-37)	Success (SLC‑40)	Success (ASOG)	Expended
B1073	F9 B5	21	March 4, 2024	F9-307	49 days	Starlink v2 × 23 (Group 6-41)	Success (SLC‑40)	Success (ASOG)	Expended
B1073	F9 B5	21	April 7, 2024	F9-320	34 days	Bandwagon-1 (11 Sats)	Success (LC‑39A)	Success (LZ‑1)	Expended
B1073	F9 B5	21	May 13, 2024	F9-334	36 days	Starlink v2 × 23 (Group 6-58)	Success (SLC‑40)	Success (ASOG)	Expended
B1073	F9 B5	21	July 3, 2024	F9-352	51 days	Starlink v2 × 20 (Group 8-9)	Success (SLC‑40)	Success (ASOG)	Expended
B1073	F9 B5	21	August 12, 2024	F9-363	40 days	Starlink v2 × 23 (Group 10-7)	Success (LC‑39A)	Success (ASOG)	Expended
B1073	F9 B5	21	October 23, 2024	F9-384	72 days	Starlink v2 × 23 (Group 6-61)	Success (SLC‑40)	Success (ASOG)	Expended
B1073	F9 B5	21	November 18, 2024	F9-398	26 days	GSAT-20 (GSAT-N2)	Success (SLC‑40)	Success (JRTI)	Expended
B1073	F9 B5	21	January 4, 2025	F9-418	47 days	Thuraya 4-NGS	Success (SLC‑40)	Success (ASOG)	Expended
B1073	F9 B5	21	January 30, 2025	F9-430	26 days	Spainsat-NG I	Success (LC‑39A)	No attempt	Expended
B1074	FH core	1	July 29, 2023	FH-007	—N/a	Jupiter-3 (EchoStar-24)	Success (LC‑39A)	No attempt	Expended
B1076	F9 B5	22	November 26, 2022	F9-187	—N/a	CRS-26 (Dragon C211‑1)	Success (LC‑39A)	Success (JRTI)	Expended
B1076	F9 B5	22	January 10, 2023	F9-196	45 days	OneWeb Flight 16	Success (SLC‑40)	Success (LZ‑1)	Expended
B1076	F9 B5	22	February 27, 2023	F9-206	48 days	Starlink v2 × 21 (Group 6-1)	Success (SLC‑40)	Success (ASOG)	Expended
B1076	F9 B5	22	April 7, 2023	F9-216	39 days	Intelsat 40e/Tempo	Success (SLC‑40)	Success (ASOG)	Expended
B1076	F9 B5	22	May 19, 2023	F9-224	42 days	Starlink v2 × 22 (Group 6-3)	Success (SLC‑40)	Success (ASOG)	Expended
B1076	F9 B5	22	July 24, 2023	F9-241	66 days	Starlink v2 × 22 (Group 6-6)	Success (SLC‑40)	Success (JRTI)	Expended
B1076	F9 B5	22	September 9, 2023	F9-254	47 days	Starlink v2 × 22 (Group 6-14)	Success (SLC‑40)	Success (ASOG)	Expended
B1076	F9 B5	22	October 5, 2023	F9-261	26 days	Starlink v2 × 22 (Group 6-21)	Success (SLC‑40)	Success (JRTI)	Expended
B1076	F9 B5	22	November 12, 2023	F9-273	38 days	O3b mPOWER 5 & 6	Success (SLC‑40)	Success (ASOG)	Expended
B1076	F9 B5	22	January 3, 2024	F9-287	52 days	Ovzon-3	Success (SLC‑40)	Success (LZ‑1)	Expended
B1076	F9 B5	22	February 29, 2024	F9-304	57 days	Starlink v2 × 23 (Group 6-40)	Success (SLC‑40)	Success (JRTI)	Expended
B1076	F9 B5	22	March 30, 2024	F9-315	30 days	Eutelsat 36D	Success (LC‑39A)	Success (JRTI)	Expended
B1076	F9 B5	22	April 28, 2024	F9-328	29 days	Starlink v2 × 23 (Group 6-54)	Success (SLC‑40)	Success (JRTI)	Expended
B1076	F9 B5	22	June 1, 2024	F9-342	34 days	Starlink v2 × 23 (Group 6-64)	Success (SLC‑40)	Success (ASOG)	Expended
B1076	F9 B5	22	July 8, 2024	F9-353	37 days	Türksat 6A	Success (SLC‑40)	Success (JRTI)	Expended
B1076	F9 B5	22	August 15, 2024	F9-364	38 days	WorldView Legion 3 & 4	Success (SLC‑40)	Success (LZ‑1)	Expended
B1076	F9 B5	22	October 18, 2024	F9-382	64 days	Starlink v2 × 20 (Group 8-19)	Success (SLC‑40)	Success (JRTI)	Expended
B1076	F9 B5	22	November 14, 2024	F9-395	27 days	Starlink v2 × 24 (Group 6-68)	Success (SLC‑40)	Success (JRTI)	Expended
B1076	F9 B5	22	December 5, 2024	F9-407	21 days	SXM-9	Success (LC‑39A)	Success (JRTI)	Expended
B1076	F9 B5	22	January 27, 2025	F9-429	53 days	Starlink v2 × 21 (Group 12-7)	Success (SLC‑40)	Success (ASOG)	Expended
B1076	F9 B5	22	February 21, 2025	F9-439	25 days	Starlink v2 × 21 (Group 12-14)	Success (SLC‑40)	Success (ASOG)	Expended
B1076	F9 B5	22	October 24, 2025	F9-551	245 days	Spainsat-NG II	Success (SLC‑40)	No attempt	Expended
B1079	FH core	1	October 13, 2023	FH-008	—N/a	Psyche	Success (LC‑39A)	No attempt	Expended
B1084	FH core	1	December 29, 2023	FH-009	—N/a	USSF-52 (Boeing X-37B OTV-7)	Success (LC‑39A)	No attempt	Expended
B1086	FH side	5	June 25, 2024	FH-010	—N/a	GOES-19	Success (LC‑39A)	Success (LZ‑1)	Destroyed in landing failure (Note: A fire burning inside the booster caused one of the landing legs to fail shortly after touchdown.)
B1086	F9 B5	5	December 8, 2024	F9-408	166 days	Starlink v2 × 23 (Group 12-5)	Success (SLC‑40)	Success (ASOG)	Destroyed in landing failure
B1086	F9 B5	5	January 8, 2025	F9-420	31 days	Starlink v2 × 21 (Group 12-11)	Success (LC‑39A)	Success (ASOG)	Destroyed in landing failure
B1086	F9 B5	5	February 4, 2025	F9-433	27 days	WorldView Legion 5 & 6 (2 satellites)	Success (LC‑39A)	Success (LZ‑1)	Destroyed in landing failure
B1086	F9 B5	5	March 3, 2025	F9-443	27 days	Starlink v2 × 21 (Group 12-20)	Success (SLC‑40)	Failure (JRTI)	Destroyed in landing failure
B1087	FH core	1	June 25, 2024	FH-010	—N/a	GOES-19	Success (LC‑39A)	No attempt	Expended
B1089	FH core	1	October 14, 2024	FH-011	—N/a	Europa Clipper	Success (LC‑39A)	No attempt	Expended
B1098	FH core	1	April 29, 2026	FH-012	—N/a	ViaSat-3 F3	Success (LC‑39A)	No attempt	Expended
B1105	FH core	1	August 30, 2026	FH-013	—N/a	Nancy Grace Roman Space Telescope	Success (LC‑39A)	No attempt	Expended
B1106	FH core	1	October 2, 2026	FH-014	—N/a	NROL-97	Success (LC‑39A)	No attempt	Expended

==== Presumed active ====
S/N	Type	Launches	Launch date (UTC)	Flight No. (Note: Entries with mint colored background denote flights using new boosters.)	Turnaround time	Payload (Note: Mission names are presented in parentheses when applicable.)	Launch (pad)	Landing (location)	Status
B1063	F9 B5	36	November 21, 2020	F9-099	—N/a	Sentinel-6A	Success (SLC‑4E)	Success (LZ‑4)	Awaiting assignment
B1063	F9 B5	36	May 26, 2021	F9-119	186 days	Starlink × 60 (v1.0 L28)	Success (SLC‑40)	Success (JRTI)	Awaiting assignment
B1063	F9 B5	36	November 24, 2021	F9-129	182 days	DART	Success (SLC‑4E)	Success (OCISLY)	Awaiting assignment
B1063	F9 B5	36	February 25, 2022	F9-142	93 days	Starlink × 50 (Group 4-11)	Success (SLC‑4E)	Success (OCISLY)	Awaiting assignment
B1063	F9 B5	36	May 14, 2022	F9-153	78 days	Starlink × 53 (Group 4-13)	Success (SLC‑4E)	Success (OCISLY)	Awaiting assignment
B1063	F9 B5	36	July 11, 2022	F9-163	58 days	Starlink × 46 (Group 3-1)	Success (SLC‑4E)	Success (OCISLY)	Awaiting assignment
B1063	F9 B5	36	August 31, 2022	F9-173	51 days	Starlink × 46 (Group 3-4)	Success (SLC‑4E)	Success (OCISLY)	Awaiting assignment
B1063	F9 B5	36	October 28, 2022	F9-183	58 days	Starlink × 53 (Group 4-31)	Success (SLC‑4E)	Success (OCISLY)	Awaiting assignment
B1063	F9 B5	36	February 17, 2023	F9-204	112 days	Starlink × 51 (Group 2-5)	Success (SLC‑4E)	Success (OCISLY)	Awaiting assignment
B1063	F9 B5	36	April 15, 2023	F9-217	57 days	Transporter-7 (51 Sats)	Success (SLC‑4E)	Success (LZ‑4)	Awaiting assignment
B1063	F9 B5	36	May 20, 2023	F9-225	35 days	Iridium NEXT × 5 (NEXT-9) OneWeb #19	Success (SLC‑4E)	Success (OCISLY)	Awaiting assignment
B1063	F9 B5	36	July 7, 2023	F9-237	48 days	Starlink × 48 (Group 5-13)	Success (SLC‑4E)	Success (OCISLY)	Awaiting assignment
B1063	F9 B5	36	September 2, 2023	F9-252	57 days	SDA Tranche 0, Flight 2	Success (SLC‑4E)	Success (LZ‑4)	Awaiting assignment
B1063	F9 B5	36	October 9, 2023	F9-262	37 days	Starlink v2 × 21 (Group 7-4)	Success (SLC‑4E)	Success (OCISLY)	Awaiting assignment
B1063	F9 B5	36	November 20, 2023	F9-275	42 days	Starlink v2 × 22 (Group 7-7)	Success (SLC‑4E)	Success (OCISLY)	Awaiting assignment
B1063	F9 B5	36	January 24, 2024	F9-292	65 days	Starlink v2 × 22 (Group 7-11)	Success (SLC‑4E)	Success (OCISLY)	Awaiting assignment
B1063	F9 B5	36	March 11, 2024	F9-309	47 days	Starlink v2 × 23 (Group 7-17)	Success (SLC‑4E)	Success (OCISLY)	Awaiting assignment
B1063	F9 B5	36	May 14, 2024	F9-335	64 days	Starlink v2 × 20 (Group 8-7)	Success (SLC‑4E)	Success (OCISLY)	Awaiting assignment
B1063	F9 B5	36	July 12, 2024	F9-354	59 days	Starlink v2 × 20 (Group 9-3)	Failure (Note: The first-stage booster performed nominally; the failure occurred on the second stage, which had a liquid oxygen leak.) (SLC‑4E)	Success (OCISLY)	Awaiting assignment
B1063	F9 B5	36	September 6, 2024	F9-371	56 days	NROL-113 (Starshield satellites)	Success (SLC‑4E)	Success (OCISLY)	Awaiting assignment
B1063	F9 B5	36	October 24, 2024	F9-385	48 days	NROL-167 (Starshield satellites)	Success (SLC‑4E)	Success (OCISLY)	Awaiting assignment
B1063	F9 B5	36	December 17, 2024	F9-411	54 days	NROL-149 (Starshield satellites)	Success (SLC‑4E)	Success (OCISLY)	Awaiting assignment
B1063	F9 B5	36	January 24, 2025	F9-428	38 days	Starlink v2 × 23 (Group 11-6)	Success (SLC‑4E)	Success (OCISLY)	Awaiting assignment
B1063	F9 B5	36	March 26, 2025	F9-452	61 days	Starlink v2 × 27 (Group 11-7)	Success (SLC‑4E)	Success (OCISLY)	Awaiting assignment
B1063	F9 B5	36	April 28, 2025	F9-466	33 days	Starlink v2 × 27 (Group 11-9)	Success (SLC‑4E)	Success (OCISLY)	Awaiting assignment
B1063	F9 B5	36	June 4, 2025	F9-485	37 days	Starlink v2 × 27 (Group 11-22)	Success (SLC‑4E)	Success (OCISLY)	Awaiting assignment
B1063	F9 B5	36	August 26, 2025	F9-521	83 days	NAOS + 7 rideshares	Success (SLC‑4E)	Success (LZ‑4)	Awaiting assignment
B1063	F9 B5	36	September 29, 2025	F9-541	34 days	Starlink x 28 (Group 11-20)	Success (SLC‑4E)	Success (OCISLY)	Awaiting assignment
B1063	F9 B5	36	October 31, 2025	F9-556	32 days	Starlink x 28 (Group 11-23)	Success (SLC‑4E)	Success (OCISLY)	Awaiting assignment
B1063	F9 B5	36	December 17, 2025	F9-582	47 days	Starlink x 27 (Group 15-13)	Success (SLC‑4E)	Success (OCISLY)	Awaiting assignment
B1063	F9 B5	36	February 21, 2026	F9-603	66 days	Starlink x 25 (Group 17-25)	Success (SLC‑4E)	Success (OCISLY)	Awaiting assignment
B1063	F9 B5	36	April 11, 2026	F9-625	49 days	Starlink x 25 (Group 17-21)	Success (SLC‑4E)	Success (OCISLY)	Awaiting assignment
B1063	F9 B5	36	June 21, 2026	F9-654	71 days	Starlink x 24 (Group 17-28)	Success (SLC‑4E)	Success (OCISLY)	Awaiting assignment
B1063	F9 B5	36	August 4, 2026	F9-672	44 days	Starlink x 24 (Group 17-53)	Success (SLC‑4E)	Success (OCISLY)	Awaiting assignment
B1063	F9 B5	36	September 2, 2026	F9-684	29 days	Starlink x 27 (Group 15-23)	Success (SLC‑4E)	Success (OCISLY)	Awaiting assignment
B1063	F9 B5	36	October 23, 2026	F9-698	51 days	Starlink x 27 (Group 15-15)	Success (SLC‑4E)	Success (OCISLY)	Awaiting assignment
B1067	F9 B5	37	June 3, 2021	F9-120	—N/a	CRS-22 (Dragon C209‑1)	Success (LC‑39A)	Success (OCISLY)	Awaiting assignment
B1067	F9 B5	37	November 11, 2021	F9-127	161 days	Crew-3 (Dragon C210‑1 Endurance)	Success (LC‑39A)	Success (ASOG)	Awaiting assignment
B1067	F9 B5	37	December 19, 2021	F9-133	38 days	Türksat 5B	Success (SLC‑40)	Success (ASOG)	Awaiting assignment
B1067	F9 B5	37	April 27, 2022	F9-150	129 days	Crew-4 (Dragon C212‑1 Freedom)	Success (LC‑39A)	Success (ASOG)	Awaiting assignment
B1067	F9 B5	37	July 14, 2022	F9-164	78 days	CRS-25 (Dragon C208-3)	Success (LC‑39A)	Success (ASOG)	Awaiting assignment
B1067	F9 B5	37	September 19, 2022	F9-176	67 days	Starlink × 54 (Group 4-34)	Success (SLC‑40)	Success (JRTI)	Awaiting assignment
B1067	F9 B5	37	November 3, 2022	F9-184	45 days	Hotbird 13G	Success (SLC‑40)	Success (JRTI)	Awaiting assignment
B1067	F9 B5	37	December 16, 2022	F9-191	43 days	O3b mPOWER 1 & 2	Success (SLC‑40)	Success (ASOG)	Awaiting assignment
B1067	F9 B5	37	January 26, 2023	F9-199	41 days	Starlink × 56 (Group 5-2)	Success (SLC‑40)	Success (JRTI)	Awaiting assignment
B1067	F9 B5	37	March 24, 2023	F9-213	57 days	Starlink × 56 (Group 5-5)	Success (SLC‑40)	Success (ASOG)	Awaiting assignment
B1067	F9 B5	37	May 14, 2023	F9-223	51 days	Starlink × 56 (Group 5-9)	Success (SLC‑40)	Success (JRTI)	Awaiting assignment
B1067	F9 B5	37	June 18, 2023	F9-233	35 days	Satria	Success (SLC‑40)	Success (ASOG)	Awaiting assignment
B1067	F9 B5	37	August 17, 2023	F9-247	60 days	Starlink v2 × 22 (Group 6-10)	Success (SLC‑40)	Success (ASOG)	Awaiting assignment
B1067	F9 B5	37	October 13, 2023	F9-263	57 days	Starlink v2 × 22 (Group 6-22)	Success (SLC‑40)	Success (ASOG)	Awaiting assignment
B1067	F9 B5	37	November 22, 2023	F9-276	40 days	Starlink v2 × 23 (Group 6-29)	Success (SLC‑40)	Success (ASOG)	Awaiting assignment
B1067	F9 B5	37	January 7, 2024	F9-288	46 days	Starlink v2 × 23 (Group 6-35)	Success (SLC‑40)	Success (ASOG)	Awaiting assignment
B1067	F9 B5	37	February 20, 2024	F9-301	44 days	Telkomsat Merah Putih 2 (HTS 113BT)	Success (SLC‑40)	Success (JRTI)	Awaiting assignment
B1067	F9 B5	37	March 31, 2024	F9-316	40 days	Starlink v2 × 23 (Group 6-45)	Success (SLC‑40)	Success (ASOG)	Awaiting assignment
B1067	F9 B5	37	May 3, 2024	F9-330	33 days	Starlink v2 × 23 (Group 6-55)	Success (SLC‑40)	Success (ASOG)	Awaiting assignment
B1067	F9 B5	37	June 5, 2024	F9-343	33 days	Starlink v2 × 20 (Group 8-5)	Success (SLC‑40)	Success (JRTI)	Awaiting assignment
B1067	F9 B5	37	August 10, 2024	F9-361	66 days	Starlink v2 × 21 (Group 8-3)	Success (SLC‑40)	Success (JRTI)	Awaiting assignment
B1067	F9 B5	37	September 18, 2024	F9-375	39 days	Galileo FOC FM26 & FOC FM32	Success (SLC‑40)	Success (JRTI)	Awaiting assignment
B1067	F9 B5	37	November 11, 2024	F9-392	54 days	Koreasat 6A	Success (LC‑39A)	Success (LZ‑1)	Awaiting assignment
B1067	F9 B5	37	December 4, 2024	F9-405	23 days	Starlink v2 × 24 (Group 6-70)	Success (SLC‑40)	Success (ASOG)	Awaiting assignment
B1067	F9 B5	37	January 10, 2025	F9-422	37 days	Starlink v2 × 21 (Group 12-12)	Success (SLC‑40)	Success (JRTI)	Awaiting assignment
B1067	F9 B5	37	February 15, 2025	F9-437	36 days	Starlink v2 × 21 (Group 12-8)	Success (SLC‑40)	Success (ASOG)	Awaiting assignment
B1067	F9 B5	37	April 14, 2025	F9-460	58 days	Starlink v2 × 27 (Group 6-73)	Success (SLC‑40)	Success (JRTI)	Awaiting assignment
B1067	F9 B5	37	May 13, 2025	F9-474	29 days	Starlink v2 × 28 (Group 6-83)	Success (LC‑39A)	Success (JRTI)	Awaiting assignment
B1067	F9 B5	37	July 2, 2025	F9-500	50 days	Starlink x 27 (Group 10-25)	Success (SLC‑40)	Success (ASOG)	Awaiting assignment
B1067	F9 B5	37	August 28, 2025	F9-523	57 days	Starlink x 28 (Group 10-11)	Success (LC‑39A)	Success (ASOG)	Awaiting assignment
B1067	F9 B5	37	October 19, 2025	F9-548	52 days	Starlink x 28 (Group 10-17)	Success (SLC‑40)	Success (ASOG)	Awaiting assignment
B1067	F9 B5	37	December 8, 2025	F9-575	50 days	Starlink x 29 (Group 6-92)	Success (LC‑39A)	Success (ASOG)	Awaiting assignment
B1067	F9 B5	37	February 22, 2026	F9-604	76 days	Starlink x 28 (Group 6-104)	Success (SLC‑40)	Success (ASOG)	Awaiting assignment
B1067	F9 B5	37	March 30, 2026	F9-622	36 days	Starlink x 29 (Group 10-44)	Success (SLC‑40)	Success (JRTI)	Awaiting assignment
B1067	F9 B5	37	June 8, 2026	F9-648	70 days	Starlink x 29 (Group 10-35)	Success (SLC‑40)	Success (ASOG)	Awaiting assignment
B1067	F9 B5	37	July 9, 2026	F9-662	31 days	Starlink x 29 (Group 10-42)	Success (SLC‑40)	Success (ASOG)	Awaiting assignment
B1067	F9 B5	37	August 25, 2026	F9-682	47 days	Starlink x 29 (Group 10-49)	Success (SLC‑40)	Success (ASOG)	Awaiting assignment
B1071	F9 B5	35	February 2, 2022	F9-139	—N/a	NROL-87	Success (SLC‑4E)	Success (LZ‑4)	Awaiting assignment
B1071	F9 B5	35	April 17, 2022	F9-148	74 days	NROL-85	Success (SLC‑4E)	Success (LZ‑4)	Awaiting assignment
B1071	F9 B5	35	June 18, 2022	F9-159	62 days	SARah-1	Success (SLC‑4E)	Success (LZ‑4)	Awaiting assignment
B1071	F9 B5	35	July 22, 2022	F9-166	34 days	Starlink × 46 (Group 3-2)	Success (SLC‑4E)	Success (OCISLY)	Awaiting assignment
B1071	F9 B5	35	October 5, 2022	F9-179	75 days	Starlink × 52 (Group 4-29)	Success (SLC‑4E)	Success (OCISLY)	Awaiting assignment
B1071	F9 B5	35	December 16, 2022	F9-190	72 days	SWOT	Success (SLC‑4E)	Success (LZ‑4)	Awaiting assignment
B1071	F9 B5	35	January 31, 2023	F9-200	46 days	Starlink × 49 (Group 2-6) & D-Orbit Starfield ION SCV009	Success (SLC‑4E)	Success (OCISLY)	Awaiting assignment
B1071	F9 B5	35	March 17, 2023	F9-211	45 days	Starlink × 52 (Group 2-8)	Success (SLC‑4E)	Success (OCISLY)	Awaiting assignment
B1071	F9 B5	35	June 12, 2023	F9-232	87 days	Transporter-8 (72 Sats)	Success (SLC‑4E)	Success (LZ‑4)	Awaiting assignment
B1071	F9 B5	35	July 20, 2023	F9-240	38 days	Starlink v2 × 15 (Group 6-15)	Success (SLC‑4E)	Success (OCISLY)	Awaiting assignment
B1071	F9 B5	35	September 12, 2023	F9-255	54 days	Starlink v2 × 21 (Group 7-2)	Success (SLC‑4E)	Success (OCISLY)	Awaiting assignment
B1071	F9 B5	35	November 11, 2023	F9-272	60 days	Transporter-9 (113 Sats)	Success (SLC‑4E)	Success (LZ‑4)	Awaiting assignment
B1071	F9 B5	35	December 8, 2023	F9-281	27 days	Starlink v2 × 22 (Group 7-8)	Success (SLC‑4E)	Success (OCISLY)	Awaiting assignment
B1071	F9 B5	35	February 10, 2024	F9-297	64 days	Starlink v2 × 22 (Group 7-13)	Success (SLC‑4E)	Success (OCISLY)	Awaiting assignment
B1071	F9 B5	35	April 2, 2024	F9-317	52 days	Starlink v2 × 22 (Group 7-18)	Success (SLC‑4E)	Success (OCISLY)	Awaiting assignment
B1071	F9 B5	35	May 22, 2024	F9-337	50 days	NROL-146 (Starshield satellites)	Success (SLC‑4E)	Success (OCISLY)	Awaiting assignment
B1071	F9 B5	35	July 28, 2024	F9-357	67 days	Starlink v2 × 21 (Group 9-4)	Success (SLC‑4E)	Success (OCISLY)	Awaiting assignment
B1071	F9 B5	35	September 13, 2024	F9-374	47 days	Starlink v2 × 21 (Group 9-6)	Success (SLC‑4E)	Success (OCISLY)	Awaiting assignment
B1071	F9 B5	35	October 15, 2024	F9-381	32 days	Starlink v2 × 20 (Group 9-7)	Success (SLC‑4E)	Success (OCISLY)	Awaiting assignment
B1071	F9 B5	35	November 18, 2024	F9-397	34 days	Starlink v2 × 20 (Group 9-12)	Success (SLC‑4E)	Success (OCISLY)	Awaiting assignment
B1071	F9 B5	35	December 21, 2024	F9-413	33 days	Bandwagon-2 (30 sats)	Success (SLC‑4E)	Success (LZ‑4)	Awaiting assignment
B1071	F9 B5	35	January 10, 2025	F9-421	20 days	NROL-153 (Starshield satellites)	Success (SLC‑4E)	Success (OCISLY)	Awaiting assignment
B1071	F9 B5	35	February 11, 2025	F9-435	32 days	Starlink v2 × 23 (Group 11-10)	Success (SLC‑4E)	Success (OCISLY)	Awaiting assignment
B1071	F9 B5	35	April 12, 2025	F9-458	60 days	NROL-192 (Starshield satellites)	Success (SLC‑4E)	Success (OCISLY)	Awaiting assignment
B1071	F9 B5	35	May 31, 2025	F9-483	49 days	Starlink v2 × 27 (Group 11-18)	Success (SLC‑4E)	Success (OCISLY)	Awaiting assignment
B1071	F9 B5	35	June 23, 2025	F9-494	23 days	Transporter-14 (70 Sats)	Success (SLC‑4E)	Success (OCISLY)	Awaiting assignment
B1071	F9 B5	35	July 31, 2025	F9-511	38 days	Starlink x 19 (Group 13-4)	Success (SLC‑4E)	Success (OCISLY)	Awaiting assignment
B1071	F9 B5	35	September 13, 2025	F9-532	44 days	Starlink x 24 (Group 17-10)	Success (SLC‑4E)	Success (OCISLY)	Awaiting assignment
B1071	F9 B5	35	October 8, 2025	F9-544	25 days	Starlink x 28 (Group 11-17)	Success (SLC‑4E)	Success (OCISLY)	Awaiting assignment
B1071	F9 B5	35	November 28, 2025	F9-569	51 days	Transporter-15	Success (SLC‑4E)	Success (OCISLY)	Awaiting assignment
B1071	F9 B5	35	February 2, 2026	F9-596	66 days	Starlink x 25 (Group 17-32)	Success (SLC‑4E)	Success (OCISLY)	Awaiting assignment
B1071	F9 B5	35	March 12, 2026	F9-613	38 days	Starlink x 25 (Group 17-31)	Success (SLC‑4E)	Success (OCISLY)	Awaiting assignment
B1071	F9 B5	35	May 3, 2026	F9-635	52 days	CAS500-2 & 45 Rideshares	Success (SLC‑4E)	Success (LZ‑4)	Awaiting assignment
B1071	F9 B5	35	June 11, 2026	F9-649	39 days	Starlink x 24 (Group 17-44)	Success (SLC‑4E)	Success (OCISLY)	Awaiting assignment
B1071	F9 B5	35	July 11, 2026	F9-663	30 days	Starlink x 24 (Group 17-48)	Success (SLC‑4E)	Success (OCISLY)	Awaiting assignment
B1072	FH side	4	June 25, 2024	FH-010	—N/a	GOES-19	Success (LC‑39A)	Success (LZ‑2)	Awaiting assignment
B1072	FH side	4	April 29, 2026	FH-012	673 days	ViaSat-3 F3	Success (LC‑39A)	Success (LZ‑2)	Awaiting assignment
B1072	FH side	4	August 30, 2026	FH-013	123 days	Nancy Grace Roman Space Telescope	Success (LC‑39A)	Success (LZ‑2)	Awaiting assignment
B1072	FH side	4	October 2, 2026	FH-014	33 days	NROL-97	Success (LC‑39A)	Success (LZ‑2)	Awaiting assignment
B1075	F9 B5	22	January 19, 2023	F9-198	—N/a	Starlink × 51 (Group 2-4)	Success (SLC‑4E)	Success (OCISLY)	Awaiting assignment
B1075	F9 B5	22	April 2, 2023	F9-215	73 days	SDA Tranche 0, Flight 1	Success (SLC‑4E)	Success (LZ‑4)	Awaiting assignment
B1075	F9 B5	22	May 10, 2023	F9-222	38 days	Starlink × 51 (Group 2-9)	Success (SLC‑4E)	Success (OCISLY)	Awaiting assignment
B1075	F9 B5	22	June 22, 2023	F9-234	43 days	Starlink × 47 (Group 5-7)	Success (SLC‑4E)	Success (OCISLY)	Awaiting assignment
B1075	F9 B5	22	August 8, 2023	F9-245	47 days	Starlink v2 × 15 (Group 6-20)	Success (SLC‑4E)	Success (OCISLY)	Awaiting assignment
B1075	F9 B5	22	September 25, 2023	F9-259	48 days	Starlink v2 × 21 (Group 7-3)	Success (SLC‑4E)	Success (OCISLY)	Awaiting assignment
B1075	F9 B5	22	October 29, 2023	F9-267	34 days	Starlink v2 × 22 (Group 7-6)	Success (SLC‑4E)	Success (OCISLY)	Awaiting assignment
B1075	F9 B5	22	December 24, 2023	F9-284	56 days	SARah 2 & 3	Success (SLC‑4E)	Success (LZ‑4)	Awaiting assignment
B1075	F9 B5	22	January 29, 2024	F9-294	36 days	Starlink v2 × 22 (Group 7-12)	Success (SLC‑4E)	Success (OCISLY)	Awaiting assignment
B1075	F9 B5	22	March 19, 2024	F9-311	50 days	Starlink v2 × 22 (Group 7-16) + Rideshare	Success (SLC‑4E)	Success (OCISLY)	Awaiting assignment
B1075	F9 B5	22	June 24, 2024	F9-349	97 days	Starlink v2 × 20 (Group 9-2)	Success (SLC‑4E)	Success (OCISLY)	Awaiting assignment
B1075	F9 B5	22	August 16, 2024	F9-365	53 days	Transporter-11 (116 Sats)	Success (SLC‑4E)	Success (LZ‑4)	Awaiting assignment
B1075	F9 B5	22	September 20, 2024	F9-376	35 days	Starlink v2 × 20 (Group 9-17)	Success (SLC‑4E)	Success (OCISLY)	Awaiting assignment
B1075	F9 B5	22	October 30, 2024	F9-387	40 days	Starlink v2 × 20 (Group 9-9)	Success (SLC‑4E)	Success (OCISLY)	Awaiting assignment
B1075	F9 B5	22	November 24, 2024	F9-400	25 days	Starlink v2 × 20 (Group 9-13)	Success (SLC‑4E)	Success (OCISLY)	Awaiting assignment
B1075	F9 B5	22	December 29, 2024	F9-415	35 days	Starlink v2 × 22 (Group 11-3)	Success (SLC‑4E)	Success (OCISLY)	Awaiting assignment
B1075	F9 B5	22	February 1, 2025	F9-431	34 days	Starlink v2 × 22 (Group 11-4)	Success (SLC‑4E)	Success (OCISLY)	Awaiting assignment
B1075	F9 B5	22	May 23, 2025	F9-478	111 days	Starlink v2 × 27 (Group 11-16)	Success (SLC‑4E)	Success (OCISLY)	Awaiting assignment
B1075	F9 B5	22	July 27, 2025	F9-509	65 days	Starlink x 24 (Group 17-2)	Success (SLC‑4E)	Success (OCISLY)	Awaiting assignment
B1075	F9 B5	22	September 6, 2025	F9-529	41 days	Starlink x 24 (Group 17-9)	Success (SLC‑4E)	Success (OCISLY)	Awaiting assignment
B1075	F9 B5	22	October 22, 2025	F9-550	46 days	Starlink x 28 (Group 11-5)	Success (SLC‑4E)	Success (OCISLY)	Awaiting assignment
B1075	FH side	22	April 29, 2026	FH-012	189 days	ViaSat-3 F3	Success (LC‑39A)	Success (LZ‑40)	Awaiting assignment
B1077	F9 B5	30	October 5, 2022	F9-178	—N/a	Crew-5 (Dragon C210‑2 Endurance)	Success (LC‑39A)	Success (JRTI)	Awaiting assignment
B1077	F9 B5	30	January 18, 2023	F9-197	105 days	GPS III SV06	Success (SLC‑40)	Success (ASOG)	Awaiting assignment
B1077	F9 B5	30	February 18, 2023	F9-205	31 days	Inmarsat 6-F2	Success (SLC‑40)	Success (JRTI)	Awaiting assignment
B1077	F9 B5	30	March 29, 2023	F9-214	39 days	Starlink × 56 (Group 5-10)	Success (SLC‑40)	Success (JRTI)	Awaiting assignment
B1077	F9 B5	30	June 5, 2023	F9-230	68 days	CRS-28 (Dragon C208‑4)	Success (LC‑39A)	Success (ASOG)	Awaiting assignment
B1077	F9 B5	30	August 3, 2023	F9-243	59 days	Galaxy 37	Success (SLC‑40)	Success (JRTI)	Awaiting assignment
B1077	F9 B5	30	September 1, 2023	F9-251	29 days	Starlink v2 × 22 (Group 6-13)	Success (SLC‑40)	Success (ASOG)	Awaiting assignment
B1077	F9 B5	30	October 30, 2023	F9-268	59 days	Starlink v2 × 23 (Group 6-25)	Success (SLC‑40)	Success (JRTI)	Awaiting assignment
B1077	F9 B5	30	December 7, 2023	F9-280	38 days	Starlink v2 × 23 (Group 6-33)	Success (SLC‑40)	Success (JRTI)	Awaiting assignment
B1077	F9 B5	30	January 30, 2024	F9-295	54 days	CRS NG-20	Success (SLC‑40)	Success (LZ‑1)	Awaiting assignment
B1077	F9 B5	30	March 10, 2024	F9-308	40 days	Starlink v2 × 23 (Group 6-43)	Success (SLC‑40)	Success (JRTI)	Awaiting assignment
B1077	F9 B5	30	April 17, 2024	F9-324	38 days	Starlink v2 × 23 (Group 6-51)	Success (LC‑39A)	Success (JRTI)	Awaiting assignment
B1077	F9 B5	30	May 24, 2024	F9-339	37 days	Starlink v2 × 23 (Group 6-63)	Success (LC‑39A)	Success (JRTI)	Awaiting assignment
B1077	F9 B5	30	July 28, 2024	F9-356	65 days	Starlink v2 × 23 (Group 10-4)	Success (SLC‑40)	Success (ASOG)	Awaiting assignment
B1077	F9 B5	30	September 5, 2024	F9-370	39 days	Starlink v2 × 21 (Group 8-11)	Success (SLC‑40)	Success (JRTI)	Awaiting assignment
B1077	F9 B5	30	November 17, 2024	F9-396	73 days	Optus-X/TD7	Success (LC‑39A)	Success (ASOG)	Awaiting assignment
B1077	F9 B5	30	January 6, 2025	F9-419	50 days	Starlink v2 × 24 (Group 6-71)	Success (SLC‑40)	Success (JRTI)	Awaiting assignment
B1077	F9 B5	30	February 11, 2025	F9-436	36 days	Starlink v2 × 21 (Group 12-18)	Success (SLC‑40)	Success (JRTI)	Awaiting assignment
B1077	F9 B5	30	March 18, 2025	F9-449	35 days	Starlink v2 × 23 (Group 12-25)	Success (SLC‑40)	Success (ASOG)	Awaiting assignment
B1077	F9 B5	30	April 28, 2025	F9-465	41 days	Starlink v2 × 23 (Group 12-23)	Success (SLC‑40)	Success (JRTI)	Awaiting assignment
B1077	F9 B5	30	June 3, 2025	F9-484	36 days	Starlink v2 × 23 (Group 12-19)	Success (SLC‑40)	Success (JRTI)	Awaiting assignment
B1077	F9 B5	30	July 8, 2025	F9-501	35 days	Starlink x 28 (Group 10-28)	Success (SLC‑40)	Success (ASOG)	Awaiting assignment
B1077	F9 B5	30	August 31, 2025	F9-525	54 days	Starlink x 28 (Group 10-14)	Success (SLC‑40)	Success (JRTI)	Awaiting assignment
B1077	F9 B5	30	October 26, 2025	F9-553	56 days	Starlink x 28 (Group 10-21)	Success (SLC‑40)	Success (ASOG)	Awaiting assignment
B1077	F9 B5	30	December 2, 2025	F9-572	37 days	Starlink x 29 (Group 6-95)	Success (SLC‑40)	Success (ASOG)	Awaiting assignment
B1077	F9 B5	30	February 20, 2026	F9-602	80 days	Starlink x 29 (Group 10-36)	Success (SLC‑40)	Success (JRTI)	Awaiting assignment
B1077	F9 B5	30	March 19, 2026	F9-617	27 days	Starlink x 29 (Group 10-33)	Success (SLC‑40)	Success (JRTI)	Awaiting assignment
B1077	F9 B5	30	May 21, 2026	F9-640	63 days	Starlink x 29 (Group 10-31)	Success (SLC‑40)	Success (ASOG)	Awaiting assignment
B1077	F9 B5	30	June 17, 2026	F9-652	27 days	BlueBird Block 2 #8-10	Success (SLC‑40)	Success (ASOG)	Awaiting assignment
B1077	F9 B5	30	August 5, 2026	F9-673	49 days	BlueBird Block 2 #11-13	Success (SLC‑40)	Success (ASOG)	Awaiting assignment
B1078	F9 B5	30	March 2, 2023	F9-207	—N/a	Crew-6 (Dragon C206‑4 Endeavour)	Success (LC‑39A)	Success (JRTI)	Awaiting assignment
B1078	F9 B5	30	April 28, 2023	F9-220	57 days	O3b mPOWER 3 & 4	Success (SLC‑40)	Success (JRTI)	Awaiting assignment
B1078	F9 B5	30	June 4, 2023	F9-229	37 days	Starlink v2 × 22 (Group 6-4)	Success (SLC‑40)	Success (JRTI)	Awaiting assignment
B1078	F9 B5	30	August 7, 2023	F9-244	64 days	Starlink v2 × 22 (Group 6-8)	Success (SLC‑40)	Success (ASOG)	Awaiting assignment
B1078	F9 B5	30	September 16, 2023	F9-256	40 days	Starlink v2 × 22 (Group 6-16)	Success (SLC‑40)	Success (JRTI)	Awaiting assignment
B1078	F9 B5	30	December 3, 2023	F9-279	78 days	Starlink v2 × 23 (Group 6-31)	Success (SLC‑40)	Success (ASOG)	Awaiting assignment
B1078	F9 B5	30	February 14, 2024	F9-298	73 days	USSF-124 (HBTSS & Tranche O)	Success (SLC‑40)	Success (LZ‑2)	Awaiting assignment
B1078	F9 B5	30	March 25, 2024	F9-314	40 days	Starlink v2 × 23 (Group 6-46)	Success (SLC‑40)	Success (ASOG)	Awaiting assignment
B1078	F9 B5	30	April 23, 2024	F9-326	29 days	Starlink v2 × 23 (Group 6-53)	Success (SLC‑40)	Success (JRTI)	Awaiting assignment
B1078	F9 B5	30	May 28, 2024	F9-340	35 days	Starlink v2 × 23 (Group 6-60)	Success (SLC‑40)	Success (ASOG)	Awaiting assignment
B1078	F9 B5	30	June 23, 2024	F9-348	26 days	Starlink v2 × 22 (Group 10-2)	Success (SLC‑40)	Success (ASOG)	Awaiting assignment
B1078	F9 B5	30	August 2, 2024	F9-358	40 days	Starlink v2 × 23 (Group 10-6)	Success (LC‑39A)	Success (ASOG)	Awaiting assignment
B1078	F9 B5	30	September 12, 2024	F9-373	41 days	BlueBird Block 1 #1-5	Success (SLC‑40)	Success (LZ‑1)	Awaiting assignment
B1078	F9 B5	30	October 30, 2024	F9-388	48 days	Starlink v2 × 23 (Group 10-13)	Success (SLC‑40)	Success (ASOG)	Awaiting assignment
B1078	F9 B5	30	November 27, 2024	F9-402	28 days	Starlink v2 × 24 (Group 6-76)	Success (LC‑39A)	Success (ASOG)	Awaiting assignment
B1078	F9 B5	30	December 31, 2024	F9-417	34 days	Starlink v2 × 21 (Group 12-6)	Success (LC‑39A)	Success (JRTI)	Awaiting assignment
B1078	F9 B5	30	February 8, 2025	F9-434	39 days	Starlink v2 × 21 (Group 12-9)	Success (SLC‑40)	Success (ASOG)	Awaiting assignment
B1078	F9 B5	30	March 15, 2025	F9-448	35 days	Starlink v2 × 23 (Group 12-16)	Success (SLC‑40)	Success (JRTI)	Awaiting assignment
B1078	F9 B5	30	April 6, 2025	F9-456	22 days	Starlink v2 × 28 (Group 6-72)	Success (SLC‑40)	Success (JRTI)	Awaiting assignment
B1078	F9 B5	30	May 4, 2025	F9-469	28 days	Starlink v2 × 29 (Group 6-84)	Success (LC‑39A)	Success (ASOG)	Awaiting assignment
B1078	F9 B5	30	June 13, 2025	F9-490	40 days	Starlink v2 × 23 (Group 12-26)	Success (SLC‑40)	Success (ASOG)	Awaiting assignment
B1078	F9 B5	30	July 26, 2025	F9-508	43 days	Starlink x 28 (Group 10-26)	Success (SLC‑40)	Success (ASOG)	Awaiting assignment
B1078	F9 B5	30	September 12, 2025	F9-531	48 days	Nusantara Lima	Success (SLC‑40)	Success (ASOG)	Awaiting assignment
B1078	F9 B5	30	November 15, 2025	F9-563	64 days	Starlink x 29 (Group 6-85)	Success (SLC‑40)	Success (JRTI)	Awaiting assignment
B1078	F9 B5	30	January 12, 2026	F9-587	58 days	Starlink x 29 (Group 6-97)	Success (SLC‑40)	Success (JRTI)	Awaiting assignment
B1078	F9 B5	30	March 2, 2026	F9-609	49 days	Starlink x 29 (Group 10-41)	Success (SLC‑40)	Success (JRTI)	Awaiting assignment
B1078	F9 B5	30	March 22, 2026	F9-619	20 days	Starlink x 29 (Group 10-62)	Success (SLC‑40)	Success (ASOG)	Awaiting assignment
B1078	F9 B5	30	May 25, 2026	F9-641	64 days	Starlink x 29 (Group 10-47)	Success (SLC‑40)	Success (ASOG)	Awaiting assignment
B1078	F9 B5	30	June 23, 2026	F9-655	29 days	SpaceX Starfall	Success (SLC‑40)	Success (ASOG)	Awaiting assignment
B1078	F9 B5	30	August 21, 2026	F9-680	59 days	Starlink x 29 (Group 10-39)	Success (SLC‑40)	Success (ASOG)	Awaiting assignment
B1080	F9 B5	29	May 21, 2023	F9-226	—N/a	Ax-2 (Dragon C212‑2 Freedom)	Success (LC‑39A)	Success (LZ‑1)	Awaiting assignment
B1080	F9 B5	29	July 1, 2023	F9-236	41 days	Euclid	Success (SLC‑40)	Success (ASOG)	Awaiting assignment
B1080	F9 B5	29	August 27, 2023	F9-250	57 days	Starlink v2 × 22 (Group 6-11)	Success (SLC‑40)	Success (JRTI)	Awaiting assignment
B1080	F9 B5	29	October 22, 2023	F9-266	56 days	Starlink v2 × 23 (Group 6-24)	Success (SLC‑40)	Success (ASOG)	Awaiting assignment
B1080	F9 B5	29	January 18, 2024	F9-291	88 days	Ax-3 (Dragon C212‑3 Freedom)	Success (LC‑39A)	Success (LZ‑1)	Awaiting assignment
B1080	F9 B5	29	March 21, 2024	F9-312	63 days	CRS-30 (Dragon C209‑4)	Success (SLC‑40)	Success (LZ‑1)	Awaiting assignment
B1080	F9 B5	29	April 18, 2024	F9-325	28 days	Starlink v2 × 23 (Group 6-52)	Success (SLC‑40)	Success (ASOG)	Awaiting assignment
B1080	F9 B5	29	May 23, 2024	F9-338	35 days	Starlink v2 × 23 (Group 6-62)	Success (SLC‑40)	Success (ASOG)	Awaiting assignment
B1080	F9 B5	29	June 20, 2024	F9-347	28 days	Astra 1P/SES-24	Success (SLC‑40)	Success (JRTI)	Awaiting assignment
B1080	F9 B5	29	August 4, 2024	F9-360	45 days	CRS NG-21	Success (SLC‑40)	Success (LZ‑1)	Awaiting assignment
B1080	F9 B5	29	October 15, 2024	F9-380	72 days	Starlink v2 × 23 (Group 10-10)	Success (SLC‑40)	Success (ASOG)	Awaiting assignment
B1080	F9 B5	29	November 11, 2024	F9-393	27 days	Starlink v2 × 24 (Group 6-69)	Success (SLC‑40)	Success (ASOG)	Awaiting assignment
B1080	F9 B5	29	November 25, 2024	F9-401	14 days	Starlink v2 × 23 (Group 12-1)	Success (SLC‑40)	Success (JRTI)	Awaiting assignment
B1080	F9 B5	29	December 23, 2024	F9-414	28 days	Starlink v2 × 21 (Group 12-2)	Success (LC‑39A)	Success (JRTI)	Awaiting assignment
B1080	F9 B5	29	January 13, 2025	F9-423	21 days	Starlink v2 × 21 (Group 12-4)	Success (SLC‑40)	Success (ASOG)	Awaiting assignment
B1080	F9 B5	29	February 18, 2025	F9-438	36 days	Starlink v2 × 21 (Group 10-12)	Success (SLC‑40)	Success (JRTI)	Awaiting assignment
B1080	F9 B5	29	March 31, 2025	F9-453	41 days	Starlink v2 × 28 (Group 6-80)	Success (SLC‑40)	Success (JRTI)	Awaiting assignment
B1080	F9 B5	29	May 2, 2025	F9-468	32 days	Starlink v2 × 28 (Group 6-75)	Success (SLC‑40)	Success (JRTI)	Awaiting assignment
B1080	F9 B5	29	May 28, 2025	F9-481	26 days	Starlink v2 × 27 (Group 10-32)	Success (LC‑39A)	Success (JRTI)	Awaiting assignment
B1080	F9 B5	29	June 25, 2025	F9-496	28 days	Starlink v2 × 27 (Group 10-16)	Success (SLC‑40)	Success (JRTI)	Awaiting assignment
B1080	F9 B5	29	August 4, 2025	F9-513	40 days	Starlink x 28 (Group 10-30)	Success (SLC‑40)	Success (JRTI)	Awaiting assignment
B1080	F9 B5	29	September 25, 2025	F9-539	52 days	Starlink x 28 (Group 10-15)	Success (SLC‑40)	Success (ASOG)	Awaiting assignment
B1080	F9 B5	29	November 21, 2025	F9-566	57 days	Starlink x 29 (Group 6-78)	Success (LC‑39A)	Success (JRTI)	Awaiting assignment
B1080	F9 B5	29	January 18, 2026	F9-590	58 days	Starlink x 29 (Group 6-100)	Success (SLC‑40)	Success (ASOG)	Awaiting assignment
B1080	F9 B5	29	March 4, 2026	F9-610	45 days	Starlink x 29 (Group 10-40)	Success (SLC‑40)	Success (ASOG)	Awaiting assignment
B1080	F9 B5	29	April 14, 2026	F9-627	41 days	Starlink x 29 (Group 10-24)	Success (SLC‑40)	Success (JRTI)	Awaiting assignment
B1080	F9 B5	29	June 12, 2026	F9-650	59 days	Starlink x 29 (Group 10-54)	Success (SLC‑40)	Success (ASOG)	Awaiting assignment
B1080	F9 B5	29	July 14, 2026	F9-665	32 days	Starlink x 29 (Group 10-45)	Success (SLC‑40)	Success (ASOG)	Awaiting assignment
B1080	F9 B5	29	September 13, 2026	F9-687	61 days	O3b mPOWER 11, 12 & 13	Success (SLC‑40)	Success (ASOG)	Awaiting assignment
B1081	F9 B5	28	August 26, 2023	F9-249	—N/a	Crew-7 (Dragon C210‑3 Endurance)	Success (LC‑39A)	Success (LZ‑1)	Awaiting Launch
B1081	F9 B5	28	November 10, 2023	F9-271	76 days	CRS-29 (Dragon C211‑2)	Success (LC‑39A)	Success (LZ‑1)	Awaiting Launch
B1081	F9 B5	28	December 19, 2023	F9-282	39 days	Starlink v2 × 23 (Group 6-34)	Success (SLC‑40)	Success (ASOG)	Awaiting Launch
B1081	F9 B5	28	February 8, 2024	F9-296	51 days	PACE	Success (SLC‑40)	Success (LZ‑1)	Awaiting Launch
B1081	F9 B5	28	March 4, 2024	F9-306	25 days	Transporter-10 (53 Sats)	Success (SLC‑4E)	Success (LZ‑4)	Awaiting Launch
B1081	F9 B5	28	April 7, 2024	F9-319	34 days	Starlink v2 × 21 (Group 8-1)	Success (SLC‑4E)	Success (OCISLY)	Awaiting Launch
B1081	F9 B5	28	May 28, 2024	F9-341	51 days	EarthCARE	Success (SLC‑4E)	Success (LZ‑4)	Awaiting Launch
B1081	F9 B5	28	June 29, 2024	F9-351	32 days	NROL-186 (Starshield satellites)	Success (SLC‑4E)	Success (OCISLY)	Awaiting Launch
B1081	F9 B5	28	August 31, 2024	F9-369	63 days	Starlink v2 × 21 (Group 9-5)	Success (SLC‑4E)	Success (OCISLY)	Awaiting Launch
B1081	F9 B5	28	September 25, 2024	F9-377	25 days	Starlink v2 × 20 (Group 9-8)	Success (SLC‑4E)	Success (OCISLY)	Awaiting Launch
B1081	F9 B5	28	November 9, 2024	F9-391	45 days	Starlink v2 × 20 (Group 9-10)	Success (SLC‑4E)	Success (OCISLY)	Awaiting Launch
B1081	F9 B5	28	December 5, 2024	F9-406	26 days	Starlink v2 × 20 (Group 9-14)	Success (SLC‑4E)	Success (OCISLY)	Awaiting Launch
B1081	F9 B5	28	March 15, 2025	F9-447	100 days	Transporter-13 (74 Sats)	Success (SLC‑4E)	Success (LZ‑4)	Awaiting Launch
B1081	F9 B5	28	May 10, 2025	F9-471	56 days	Starlink v2 × 26 (Group 15-3)	Success (SLC‑4E)	Success (OCISLY)	Awaiting Launch
B1081	F9 B5	28	June 13, 2025	F9-489	34 days	Starlink v2 × 26 (Group 15-6)	Success (SLC‑4E)	Success (OCISLY)	Awaiting Launch
B1081	F9 B5	28	July 23, 2025	F9-507	40 days	TRACERS (2 satellites) + 5 rideshares	Success (SLC‑4E)	Success (LZ‑4)	Awaiting Launch
B1081	F9 B5	28	August 22, 2025	F9-519	30 days	Starlink x 24 (Group 17-6)	Success (SLC‑4E)	Success (OCISLY)	Awaiting Launch
B1081	F9 B5	28	September 22, 2025	F9-537	31 days	NROL-48 (Starshield satellites)	Success (SLC‑4E)	Success (LZ‑4)	Awaiting Launch
B1081	F9 B5	28	October 25, 2025	F9-552	33 days	Starlink x 28 (Group 11-12)	Success (SLC‑4E)	Success (OCISLY)	Awaiting Launch
B1081	F9 B5	28	December 2, 2025	F9-571	38 days	Starlink x 27 (Group 15-10)	Success (SLC‑4E)	Success (OCISLY)	Awaiting Launch
B1081	F9 B5	28	January 3, 2026	F9-583	32 days	CSG-3	Success (SLC‑4E)	Success (LZ‑4)	Awaiting Launch
B1081	F9 B5	28	February 15, 2026	F9-600	43 days	Starlink x 24 (Group 17-13)	Success (SLC‑4E)	Success (OCISLY)	Awaiting Launch
B1081	F9 B5	28	March 26, 2026	F9-620	39 days	Starlink x 25 (Group 17-17)	Success (SLC‑4E)	Success (OCISLY)	Awaiting Launch
B1081	F9 B5	28	May 6, 2026	F9-636	41 days	Starlink x 24 (Group 17-29)	Success (SLC‑4E)	Success (OCISLY)	Awaiting Launch
B1081	F9 B5	28	June 25, 2026	F9-656	50 days	Starlink x 24 (Group 17-45)	Success (SLC‑4E)	Success (OCISLY)	Awaiting Launch
B1081	F9 B5	28	August 1, 2026	F9-671	37 days	Starlink x 24 (Group 17-52)	Success (SLC‑4E)	Success (OCISLY)	Awaiting Launch
B1081	F9 B5	28	September 10, 2026	F9-686	40 days	USSF-153 ("R-2")	Success (SLC‑4E)	Success (OCISLY)	Awaiting Launch
B1081	F9 B5	28	October 16, 2026	F9-696	36 days	USSF-481 ("TH-2")	Success (SLC‑4E)	Success (OCISLY)	Awaiting Launch
B1081	F9 B5	Planned	November 24, 2026	F9-xxx	39 days	USSF-266 ("TH-3")	Planned (SLC‑4E)	Planned (OCISLY)	Awaiting Launch
B1082	F9 B5	26	January 3, 2024	F9-286	—N/a	Starlink v2 × 21 (Group 7-9)	Success (SLC‑4E)	Success (OCISLY)	Awaiting Launch
B1082	F9 B5	26	February 15, 2024	F9-300	43 days	Starlink v2 × 22 (Group 7-14)	Success (SLC‑4E)	Success (OCISLY)	Awaiting Launch
B1082	F9 B5	26	April 11, 2024	F9-322	56 days	USSF-62 (WSF-M 1)	Success (SLC‑4E)	Success (LZ‑4)	Awaiting Launch
B1082	F9 B5	26	May 10, 2024	F9-333	29 days	Starlink v2 × 20 (Group 8-2)	Success (SLC‑4E)	Success (OCISLY)	Awaiting Launch
B1082	F9 B5	26	June 19, 2024	F9-346	40 days	Starlink v2 × 20 (Group 9-1)	Success (SLC‑4E)	Success (OCISLY)	Awaiting Launch
B1082	F9 B5	26	August 4, 2024	F9-359	46 days	Starlink v2 × 23 (Group 11-1)	Success (SLC‑4E)	Success (OCISLY)	Awaiting Launch
B1082	F9 B5	26	October 20, 2024	F9-383	77 days	OneWeb #20 (20 satellites)	Success (SLC‑4E)	Success (LZ‑4)	Awaiting Launch
B1082	F9 B5	26	November 14, 2024	F9-394	25 days	Starlink v2 × 20 (Group 9-11)	Success (SLC‑4E)	Success (OCISLY)	Awaiting Launch
B1082	F9 B5	26	December 13, 2024	F9-409	29 days	Starlink v2 × 22 (Group 11-2)	Success (SLC‑4E)	Success (OCISLY)	Awaiting Launch
B1082	F9 B5	26	January 21, 2025	F9-427	39 days	Starlink v2 × 27 (Group 11-8)	Success (SLC‑4E)	Success (OCISLY)	Awaiting Launch
B1082	F9 B5	26	February 23, 2025	F9-440	33 days	Starlink v2 × 22 (Group 15-1)	Success (SLC‑4E)	Success (OCISLY)	Awaiting Launch
B1082	F9 B5	26	April 20, 2025	F9-461	56 days	NROL-145 (Starshield satellites)	Success (SLC‑4E)	Success (OCISLY)	Awaiting Launch
B1082	F9 B5	26	May 27, 2025	F9-480	37 days	Starlink v2 × 24 (Group 17-1)	Success (SLC‑4E)	Success (OCISLY)	Awaiting Launch
B1082	F9 B5	26	July 19, 2025	F9-505	53 days	Starlink v2 × 24 (Group 17-3)	Success (SLC‑4E)	Success (OCISLY)	Awaiting Launch
B1082	F9 B5	26	August 30, 2025	F9-524	42 days	Starlink x 24 (Group 17-7)	Success (SLC‑4E)	Success (OCISLY)	Awaiting Launch
B1082	F9 B5	26	September 26, 2025	F9-540	27 days	Starlink x 24 (Group 17-11)	Success (SLC‑4E)	Success (OCISLY)	Awaiting Launch
B1082	F9 B5	26	October 28, 2025	F9-554	32 days	Starlink x 28 (Group 11-21)	Success (SLC‑4E)	Success (OCISLY)	Awaiting Launch
B1082	F9 B5	26	December 10, 2025	F9-577	43 days	Starlink x 27 (Group 15-11)	Success (SLC‑4E)	Success (OCISLY)	Awaiting Launch
B1082	F9 B5	26	January 29, 2026	F9-594	50 days	Starlink x 25 (Group 17-19)	Success (SLC‑4E)	Success (OCISLY)	Awaiting Launch
B1082	F9 B5	26	March 1, 2026	F9-608	31 days	Starlink x 25 (Group 17-23)	Success (SLC‑4E)	Success (OCISLY)	Awaiting Launch
B1082	F9 B5	26	April 15, 2026	F9-628	45 days	Starlink x 25 (Group 17-27)	Success (SLC‑4E)	Success (OCISLY)	Awaiting Launch
B1082	F9 B5	26	May 30, 2026	F9-644	45 days	Starlink x 24 (Group 17-41)	Success (SLC‑4E)	Success (OCISLY)	Awaiting Launch
B1082	F9 B5	26	July 21, 2026	F9-667	52 days	Starlink x 24 (Group 17-39)	Success (SLC‑4E)	Success (OCISLY)	Awaiting Launch
B1082	F9 B5	26	August 26, 2026	F9-683	36 days	Starlink x 27 (Group 15-22)	Success (SLC‑4E)	Success (OCISLY)	Awaiting Launch
B1082	F9 B5	26	October 1, 2026	F9-692	36 days	Transporter-18 (130 payloads)	Success (SLC‑4E)	Success (LZ‑4)	Awaiting Launch
B1082	F9 B5	26	October 27, 2026	F9-699	26 days	Starlink x 27 (Group 15-16)	Success (SLC‑4E)	Success (OCISLY)	Awaiting Launch
B1082	F9 B5	Planned	November 29, 2026	F9-xxx	33 days	USSF-380 ("R-7")	Planned (SLC‑4E)	Planned (OCISLY)	Awaiting Launch
B1083	F9 B5	16	March 4, 2024	F9-305	—N/a	Crew-8 (Dragon C206‑5 Endeavour)	Success (LC‑39A)	Success (LZ‑1)	Awaiting assignment
B1083	F9 B5	16	April 10, 2024	F9-321	37 days	Starlink v2 × 23 (Group 6-48)	Success (SLC‑40)	Success (JRTI)	Awaiting assignment
B1083	F9 B5	16	May 8, 2024	F9-332	28 days	Starlink v2 × 23 (Group 6-56)	Success (LC‑39A)	Success (ASOG)	Awaiting assignment
B1083	F9 B5	16	September 10, 2024	F9-372	125 days	Polaris Dawn (Dragon C207‑3 Resilience)	Success (LC‑39A)	Success (JRTI)	Awaiting assignment
B1083	F9 B5	16	November 5, 2024	F9-389	56 days	CRS-31 (Dragon C208‑5)	Success (LC‑39A)	Success (LZ‑1)	Awaiting assignment
B1083	F9 B5	16	November 30, 2024	F9-403	25 days	Starlink v2 × 24 (Group 6-65)	Success (SLC‑40)	Success (JRTI)	Awaiting assignment
B1083	F9 B5	16	December 29, 2024	F9-416	29 days	Astranis: From One to Many	Success (SLC‑40)	Success (ASOG)	Awaiting assignment
B1083	F9 B5	16	January 21, 2025	F9-426	23 days	Starlink v2 × 21 (Group 13-1) + Rideshare	Success (LC‑39A)	Success (ASOG)	Awaiting assignment
B1083	F9 B5	16	February 27, 2025	F9-441	37 days	IM-2 Athena	Success (LC‑39A)	Success (ASOG)	Awaiting assignment
B1083	F9 B5	16	April 13, 2025	F9-459	45 days	Starlink v2 × 21 (Group 12-17)	Success (LC‑39A)	Success (ASOG)	Awaiting assignment
B1083	F9 B5	16	May 10, 2025	F9-472	27 days	Starlink v2 × 28 (Group 6-91)	Success (SLC‑40)	Success (ASOG)	Awaiting assignment
B1083	F9 B5	16	June 10, 2025	F9-488	31 days	Starlink v2 × 23 (Group 12-24)	Success (SLC‑40)	Success (JRTI)	Awaiting assignment
B1083	F9 B5	16	July 13, 2025	F9-502	33 days	Dror 1	Success (SLC‑40)	Success (JRTI)	Awaiting assignment
B1083	F9 B5	16	September 3, 2025	F9-527	52 days	Starlink x 28 (Group 10-22)	Success (SLC‑40)	Success (ASOG)	Awaiting assignment
B1083	F9 B5	16	October 29, 2025	F9-555	56 days	Starlink x 29 (Group 10-37)	Success (SLC‑40)	Success (JRTI)	Awaiting assignment
B1083	F9 B5	16	December 11, 2025	F9-578	43 days	Starlink x 29 (Group 6-90)	Success (SLC‑40)	Success (JRTI)	Awaiting assignment
B1085	F9 B5	19	August 20, 2024	F9-366	—N/a	Starlink v2 × 22 (Group 10-5)	Success (SLC‑40)	Success (ASOG)	Awaiting assignment
B1085	F9 B5	19	September 28, 2024	F9-378	39 days	Crew-9 (Dragon C212‑4 Freedom)	Success (SLC‑40)	Success (LZ‑1)	Awaiting assignment
B1085	F9 B5	19	November 7, 2024	F9-390	40 days	Starlink v2 × 23 (Group 6-77)	Success (SLC‑40)	Success (JRTI)	Awaiting assignment
B1085	F9 B5	19	December 17, 2024	F9-410	40 days	GPS III-7 (RRT-1)	Success (SLC‑40)	Success (ASOG)	Awaiting assignment
B1085	F9 B5	19	January 15, 2025	F9-425	29 days	Blue Ghost Mission 1 & Hakuto-R Mission 2	Success (LC‑39A)	Success (JRTI)	Awaiting assignment
B1085	F9 B5	19	April 1, 2025	F9-454	76 days	Fram2 (Dragon C207‑4 Resilience)	Success (LC‑39A)	Success (ASOG)	Awaiting assignment
B1085	F9 B5	19	May 7, 2025	F9-470	36 days	Starlink v2 × 28 (Group 6-93)	Success (SLC‑40)	Success (JRTI)	Awaiting assignment
B1085	F9 B5	19	June 7, 2025	F9-486	31 days	SXM-10	Success (SLC‑40)	Success (ASOG)	Awaiting assignment
B1085	F9 B5	19	July 1, 2025	F9-499	24 days	MTG-S1 / Sentinel-4A	Success (LC‑39A)	Success (JRTI)	Awaiting assignment
B1085	F9 B5	19	August 14, 2025	F9-516	44 days	Starlink x 28 (Group 10-20)	Success (SLC‑40)	Success (JRTI)	Awaiting assignment
B1085	F9 B5	19	September 21, 2025	F9-536	38 days	Starlink x 28 (Group 10-27)	Success (SLC‑40)	Success (ASOG)	Awaiting assignment
B1085	F9 B5	19	November 19, 2025	F9-565	59 days	Starlink x 29 (Group 6-94)	Success (SLC‑40)	Success (ASOG)	Awaiting assignment
B1085	F9 B5	19	January 14, 2026	F9-588	56 days	Starlink x 29 (Group 6-98)	Success (SLC‑40)	Success (ASOG)	Awaiting assignment
B1085	F9 B5	19	March 10, 2026	F9-612	55 days	EchoStar XXV	Success (SLC‑40)	Success (ASOG)	Awaiting assignment
B1085	F9 B5	19	April 2, 2026	F9-623	23 days	Starlink x 29 (Group 10-58)	Success (SLC‑40)	Success (ASOG)	Awaiting assignment
B1085	F9 B5	19	May 29, 2026	F9-643	57 days	Starlink x 29 (Group 10-53)	Success (SLC‑40)	Success (ASOG)	Awaiting assignment
B1085	F9 B5	19	June 29, 2026	F9-658	31 days	SXM-11	Success (SLC‑40)	Success (ASOG)	Awaiting assignment
B1085	F9 B5	19	August 11, 2026	F9-675	43 days	Starlink x 29 (Group 10-19)	Success (SLC‑40)	Success (ASOG)	Awaiting assignment
B1085	F9 B5	19	October 20, 2026	F9-697	70 days	Bandwagon-5	Success (SLC‑40)	Success (ASOG)	Awaiting assignment
B1088	F9 B5	20	November 30, 2024	F9-404	—N/a	NROL-126 (Starshield) and Starlink v2 × 20	Success (SLC‑4E)	Success (OCISLY)	Awaiting assignment
B1088	F9 B5	20	January 14, 2025	F9-424	45 days	Transporter-12 (131 Sats)	Success (SLC‑4E)	Success (LZ‑4)	Awaiting assignment
B1088	F9 B5	20	March 12, 2025	F9-444	57 days	SPHEREx & PUNCH (4 satellites)	Success (SLC‑4E)	Success (LZ‑4)	Awaiting assignment
B1088	F9 B5	20	March 21, 2025	F9-450	9 days	NROL-57	Success (SLC‑4E)	Success (LZ‑4)	Awaiting assignment
B1088	F9 B5	20	April 4, 2025	F9-455	14 days	Starlink × 27 (Group 11-13)	Success (SLC‑4E)	Success (OCISLY)	Awaiting assignment
B1088	F9 B5	20	May 13, 2025	F9-473	39 days	Starlink v2 × 26 (Group 15-4)	Success (SLC‑4E)	Success (OCISLY)	Awaiting assignment
B1088	F9 B5	20	June 8, 2025	F9-487	26 days	Starlink v2 × 26 (Group 15-8)	Success (SLC‑4E)	Success (OCISLY)	Awaiting assignment
B1088	F9 B5	20	June 28, 2025	F9-498	20 days	Starlink v2 × 26 (Group 15-7)	Success (SLC‑4E)	Success (OCISLY)	Awaiting assignment
B1088	F9 B5	20	August 18, 2025	F9-517	51 days	Starlink x 24 (Group 17-5)	Success (SLC‑4E)	Success (OCISLY)	Awaiting assignment
B1088	F9 B5	20	September 19, 2025	F9-535	32 days	Starlink x 24 (Group 17-12)	Success (SLC‑4E)	Success (OCISLY)	Awaiting assignment
B1088	F9 B5	20	October 19, 2025	F9-549	30 days	Starlink x 28 (Group 11-19)	Success (SLC‑4E)	Success (OCISLY)	Awaiting assignment
B1088	F9 B5	20	December 7, 2025	F9-574	49 days	Starlink x 28 (Group 11-15)	Success (SLC‑4E)	Success (OCISLY)	Awaiting assignment
B1088	F9 B5	20	February 7, 2026	F9-597	62 days	Starlink x 25 (Group 17-33)	Success (SLC‑4E)	Success (OCISLY)	Awaiting assignment
B1088	F9 B5	20	March 17, 2026	F9-615	38 days	Starlink x 25 (Group 17-24)	Success (SLC‑4E)	Success (OCISLY)	Awaiting assignment
B1088	F9 B5	20	April 26, 2026	F9-632	40 days	Starlink x 25 (Group 17-16)	Success (SLC‑4E)	Success (OCISLY)	Awaiting assignment
B1088	F9 B5	20	June 3, 2026	F9-645	38 days	Starlink x 24 (Group 17-47)	Success (SLC‑4E)	Success (OCISLY)	Awaiting assignment
B1088	F9 B5	20	June 28, 2026	F9-657	25 days	Starlink x 24 (Group 17-40)	Success (SLC‑4E)	Success (OCISLY)	Awaiting assignment
B1088	F9 B5	20	August 16, 2026	F9-678	49 days	USSF-366	Success (SLC‑4E)	Success (OCISLY)	Awaiting assignment
B1088	F9 B5	20	September 6, 2026	F9-685	21 days	Starlink x 27 (Group 15-24)	Success (SLC‑4E)	Success (OCISLY)	Awaiting assignment
B1088	F9 B5	20	October 13, 2026	F9-694	37 days	Starlink x 27 (Group 15-25)	Success (SLC‑4E)	Success (OCISLY)	Awaiting assignment
B1090	F9 B5	14	December 17, 2024	F9-412	—N/a	O3b mPOWER 7 & 8	Success (LC‑39A)	Success (JRTI)	Awaiting assignment
B1090	F9 B5	14	March 14, 2025	F9-446	87 days	Crew-10 (Dragon C210‑4 Endurance)	Success (LC‑39A)	Success (LZ‑1)	Awaiting assignment
B1090	F9 B5	14	April 22, 2025	F9-463	39 days	Bandwagon-3	Success (SLC‑40)	Success (LZ‑2)	Awaiting assignment
B1090	F9 B5	14	May 14, 2025	F9-475	22 days	Starlink v2 × 28 (Group 6-67)	Success (SLC‑40)	Success (ASOG)	Awaiting assignment
B1090	F9 B5	14	June 18, 2025	F9-492	35 days	Starlink v2 × 28 (Group 10-18)	Success (SLC‑40)	Success (JRTI)	Awaiting assignment
B1090	F9 B5	14	July 22, 2025	F9-506	34 days	O3b mPOWER 9 & 10	Success (SLC‑40)	Success (JRTI)	Awaiting assignment
B1090	F9 B5	14	August 24, 2025	F9-520	33 days	CRS-33 (Dragon C211‑3)	Success (SLC‑40)	Success (ASOG)	Awaiting assignment
B1090	F9 B5	14	October 7, 2025	F9-543	44 days	Starlink x 28 (Group 10-59)	Success (SLC‑40)	Success (ASOG)	Awaiting assignment
B1090	F9 B5	14	November 22, 2025	F9-567	46 days	Starlink x 29 (Group 6-79)	Success (SLC‑40)	Success (ASOG)	Awaiting assignment
B1090	F9 B5	14	February 16, 2026	F9-601	86 days	Starlink x 29 (Group 6-103)	Success (SLC‑40)	Success (ASOG)	Awaiting assignment
B1090	F9 B5	14	March 17, 2026	F9-616	29 days	Starlink x 29 (Group 10-46)	Success (SLC‑40)	Success (ASOG)	Awaiting assignment
B1090	F9 B5	14	June 4, 2026	F9-646	79 days	Starlink x 29 (Group 10-43)	Success (SLC‑40)	Success (ASOG)	Awaiting assignment
B1090	F9 B5	14	July 5, 2026	F9-660	31 days	Starlink x 29 (Group 10-50)	Success (SLC‑40)	Success (ASOG)	Awaiting assignment
B1090	F9 B5	14	August 16, 2026	F9-677	42 days	Globalstar-2R M104–111 (8 satellites)	Success (SLC‑40)	Success (LZ‑40)	Awaiting assignment
B1091	F9 B5 (Note: will initially fly Falcon 9 missions.)	3	August 11, 2025	F9-514	—N/a	KuiperSat × 24 (KF-02)	Success (SLC‑40)	Success (ASOG)	Awaiting assignment
B1091	F9 B5	3	October 14, 2025	F9-545	64 days	KuiperSat × 24 (KF-03)	Success (SLC‑40)	Success (ASOG)	Awaiting assignment
B1091	F9 B5	3	November 2, 2025	F9-557	19 days	Bandwagon-4 (18 Sats)	Success (SLC‑40)	Success (LZ‑2)	Awaiting assignment
B1091	FH core	Planned	?	-	—N/a	?	Planned (LC‑39A)	?	Awaiting assignment
B1092	F9 B5	10	February 27, 2025	F9-442	—N/a	Starlink × 21 (Group 12-13)	Success (SLC‑40)	Success (JRTI)	Awaiting assignment
B1092	F9 B5	10	March 24, 2025	F9-451	25 days	NROL-69	Success (SLC‑40)	Success (LZ‑1)	Awaiting assignment
B1092	F9 B5	10	April 21, 2025	F9-462	28 days	CRS-32 (Dragon C209‑5)	Success (LC‑39A)	Success (LZ‑1)	Awaiting assignment
B1092	F9 B5	10	May 30, 2025	F9-482	39 days	GPS III SV08	Success (SLC‑40)	Success (ASOG)	Awaiting assignment
B1092	F9 B5	10	June 28, 2025	F9-497	29 days	Starlink x 27 (Group 10-34)	Success (SLC‑40)	Success (ASOG)	Awaiting assignment
B1092	F9 B5	10	August 22, 2025	F9-518	55 days	USSF-36 (Boeing X-37B OTV-8)	Success (LC‑39A)	Success (LZ‑2)	Awaiting assignment
B1092	F9 B5	10	September 18, 2025	F9-534	27 days	Starlink x 28 (Group 10-61)	Success (SLC‑40)	Success (JRTI)	Awaiting assignment
B1092	F9 B5	10	November 15, 2025	F9-562	58 days	Starlink x 29 (Group 6-89)	Success (LC‑39A)	Success (ASOG)	Awaiting assignment
B1092	F9 B5	10	December 15, 2025	F9-580	30 days	Starlink x 29 (Group 6-82)	Success (SLC‑40)	Success (ASOG)	Awaiting assignment
B1092	F9 B5	10	February 24, 2026	F9-605	71 days	Starlink x 29 (Group 6-110)	Success (SLC‑40)	Success (JRTI)	Awaiting assignment
B1093	F9 B5	18	April 7, 2025	F9-457	—N/a	Starlink × 27 (Group 11-11)	Success (SLC‑4E)	Success (OCISLY)	Awaiting assignment
B1093	F9 B5	18	May 16, 2025	F9-476	39 days	Starlink v2 × 26 (Group 15-5)	Success (SLC‑4E)	Success (OCISLY)	Awaiting assignment
B1093	F9 B5	18	June 17, 2025	F9-491	32 days	Starlink v2 × 26 (Group 15-9)	Success (SLC‑4E)	Success (OCISLY)	Awaiting assignment
B1093	F9 B5	18	July 16, 2025	F9-503	29 days	Starlink v2 × 26 (Group 15-2)	Success (SLC‑4E)	Success (OCISLY)	Awaiting assignment
B1093	F9 B5	18	August 14, 2025	F9-515	29 days	Starlink x 24 (Group 17-4)	Success (SLC‑4E)	Success (OCISLY)	Awaiting assignment
B1093	F9 B5	18	September 10, 2025	F9-530	27 days	SDA Tranche 1 Transport Layer B	Success (SLC‑4E)	Success (OCISLY)	Awaiting assignment
B1093	F9 B5	18	October 15, 2025	F9-546	35 days	SDA Tranche 1 Transport Layer C	Success (SLC‑4E)	Success (OCISLY)	Awaiting assignment
B1093	F9 B5	18	November 6, 2025	F9-559	22 days	Starlink x 28 (Group 11-14)	Success (SLC‑4E)	Success (OCISLY)	Awaiting assignment
B1093	F9 B5	18	December 14, 2025	F9-579	38 days	Starlink x 27 (Group 15-12)	Success (SLC‑4E)	Success (OCISLY)	Awaiting assignment
B1093	F9 B5	18	January 22, 2026	F9-591	39 days	Starlink x 25 (Group 17-30)	Success (SLC‑4E)	Success (OCISLY)	Awaiting assignment
B1093	F9 B5	18	February 25, 2026	F9-606	34 days	Starlink x 25 (Group 17-26)	Success (SLC‑4E)	Success (OCISLY)	Awaiting assignment
B1093	F9 B5	18	March 30, 2026	F9-621	33 days	Transporter-16 (119 sats)	Success (SLC‑4E)	Success (OCISLY)	Awaiting assignment
B1093	F9 B5	18	April 30, 2026	F9-633	31 days	Starlink x 24 (Group 17-36)	Success (SLC‑4E)	Success (OCISLY)	Awaiting assignment
B1093	F9 B5	18	June 15, 2026	F9-651	46 days	Starlink x 24 (Group 17-54)	Success (SLC‑4E)	Success (OCISLY)	Awaiting assignment
B1093	F9 B5	18	July 14, 2026	F9-664	29 days	Starlink x 27 (Group 15-14)	Success (SLC‑4E)	Success (OCISLY)	Awaiting assignment
B1093	F9 B5	18	August 8, 2026	F9-674	25 days	Starlink x 24 (Group 17-38)	Success (SLC‑4E)	Success (OCISLY)	Awaiting assignment
B1093	F9 B5	18	September 20, 2026	F9-689	43 days	Starlink x 27 (Group 15-27)	Success (SLC‑4E)	Success (OCISLY)	Awaiting assignment
B1093	F9 B5	18	October 31, 2026	F9-700	41 days	Starlink x 27 (Group 15-18)	Success (SLC‑4E)	Success (OCISLY)	Awaiting assignment
B1094	F9 B5	7	April 29, 2025	F9-467	—N/a	Starlink × 23 (Group 12-10)	Success (LC‑39A)	Success (ASOG)	Awaiting assignment
B1094	F9 B5	7	June 25, 2025	F9-495	57 days	Ax-4 (Dragon C213‑1 Grace)	Success (LC‑39A)	Success (LZ‑1)	Awaiting assignment
B1094	F9 B5	7	August 1, 2025	F9-512	37 days	Crew-11 (Dragon C206‑6 Endeavour)	Success (LC‑39A)	Success (LZ‑1)	Awaiting assignment
B1094	F9 B5	7	September 14, 2025	F9-533	44 days	CRS NG-23	Success (SLC‑40)	Success (LZ‑2)	Awaiting assignment
B1094	F9 B5	7	November 6, 2025	F9-558	53 days	Starlink x 29 (Group 6-81)	Success (SLC‑40)	Success (JRTI)	Awaiting assignment
B1094	F9 B5	7	December 17, 2025	F9-581	41 days	Starlink x 29 (Group 6-99)	Success (LC‑39A)	Success (JRTI)	Awaiting assignment
B1094	F9 B5	7	April 11, 2026	F9-626	115 days	Cygnus NG-24	Success (SLC‑40)	Success (LZ‑40)	Awaiting assignment
B1095	F9 B5	8	May 21, 2025	F9-477	—N/a	Starlink x 23 (Group 12-15)	Success (SLC‑40)	Success (JRTI)	Awaiting assignment
B1095	F9 B5	8	August 27, 2025	F9-522	98 days	Starlink x 28 (Group 10-56)	Success (SLC‑40)	Success (JRTI)	Awaiting assignment
B1095	F9 B5	8	October 16, 2025	F9-547	50 days	Starlink x 28 (Group 10-52)	Success (SLC‑40)	Success (JRTI)	Awaiting assignment
B1095	F9 B5	8	December 1, 2025	F9-570	46 days	Starlink x 29 (Group 6-86)	Success (LC‑39A)	Success (JRTI)	Awaiting assignment
B1095	F9 B5	8	January 30, 2026	F9-595	60 days	Starlink x 29 (Group 6-101)	Success (SLC‑40)	Success (JRTI)	Awaiting assignment
B1095	F9 B5	8	March 14, 2026	F9-614	43 days	Starlink x 29 (Group 10-48)	Success (SLC‑40)	Success (JRTI)	Awaiting assignment
B1095	F9 B5	8	April 21, 2026	F9-630	38 days	USA-585 (GPS III SV10)	Success (SLC‑40)	Success (JRTI)	Awaiting assignment
B1095	F9 B5	8	November 7, 2026	F9-701	200 days	USSF-432 ("R-4")	Success (SLC‑4E)	Success (OCISLY)	Awaiting assignment
B1096	F9 B5	8	July 16, 2025	F9-504	—N/a	KuiperSat × 24 (KF-01)	Success (SLC‑40)	Success (ASOG)	Awaiting Launch
B1096	F9 B5	8	September 24, 2025	F9-538	70 days	IMAP + 2 Rideshares	Success (LC‑39A)	Success (JRTI)	Awaiting Launch
B1096	F9 B5	8	November 11, 2025	F9-561	48 days	Starlink x 29 (Group 6-87)	Success (SLC‑40)	Success (JRTI)	Awaiting Launch
B1096	F9 B5	8	December 9, 2025	F9-576	28 days	NROL-77	Success (SLC‑40)	Success (LZ‑2)	Awaiting Launch
B1096	F9 B5	8	January 28, 2026	F9-593	50 days	GPS III SV09	Success (SLC‑40)	Success (ASOG)	Awaiting Launch
B1096	F9 B5	8	May 15, 2026	F9-638	107 days	CRS-34 (Dragon C209‑6)	Success (SLC‑40)	Success (LZ‑40)	Awaiting Launch
B1096	F9 B5	8	July 30, 2026	F9-670	76 days	NROL-95	Success (SLC‑40)	Success (LZ‑2)	Awaiting Launch
B1096	F9 B5	8	October 13, 2026	F9-695	75 days	CRS-35 (Dragon C211‑4)	Success (SLC‑40)	Success (LZ‑40)	Awaiting Launch
B1096	F9 B5	Planned	November 29, 2026	F9-xxx	47 days	Cygnus NG-25	Planned (SLC‑40)	Planned (LZ‑40)	Awaiting Launch
B1097	F9 B5	14	September 3, 2025	F9-526	—N/a	Starlink x 24 (Group 17-8)	Success (SLC‑4E)	Success (OCISLY)	Landed on LZ-4
B1097	F9 B5	14	October 3, 2025	F9-542	30 days	Starlink x 28 (Group 11-39)	Success (SLC‑4E)	Success (OCISLY)	Landed on LZ-4
B1097	F9 B5	14	November 17, 2025	F9-564	45 days	Sentinel-6B	Success (SLC‑4E)	Success (LZ‑4)	Landed on LZ-4
B1097	F9 B5	14	December 4, 2025	F9-573	17 days	Starlink x 28 (Group 11-25)	Success (SLC‑4E)	Success (OCISLY)	Landed on LZ-4
B1097	F9 B5	14	January 11, 2026	F9-586	38 days	Twilight (Pandora and others)	Success (SLC‑4E)	Success (LZ‑4)	Landed on LZ-4
B1097	F9 B5	14	January 25, 2026	F9-592	14 days	Starlink x 25 (Group 17-20)	Success (SLC‑4E)	Success (OCISLY)	Landed on LZ-4
B1097	F9 B5	14	March 8, 2026	F9-611	42 days	Starlink x 25 (Group 17-18)	Success (SLC‑4E)	Success (OCISLY)	Landed on LZ-4
B1097	F9 B5	14	April 19, 2026	F9-629	42 days	Starlink x 25 (Group 17-22)	Success (SLC‑4E)	Success (OCISLY)	Landed on LZ-4
B1097	F9 B5	14	May 12, 2026	F9-637	23 days	NROL-172	Success (SLC‑4E)	Success (OCISLY)	Landed on LZ-4
B1097	F9 B5	14	June 7, 2026	F9-647	26 days	Starlink x 21 (Group 17-43)	Success (SLC‑4E)	Success (OCISLY)	Landed on LZ-4
B1097	F9 B5	14	July 7, 2026	F9-661	30 days	Transporter-17	Success (SLC‑4E)	Success (OCISLY)	Landed on LZ-4
B1097	F9 B5	14	August 19, 2026	F9-679	43 days	Starlink x 24 (Group 17-50)	Success (SLC‑4E)	Success (OCISLY)	Landed on LZ-4
B1097	F9 B5	14	September 17, 2026	F9-688	29 days	USSF-259 ("TH-1")	Success (SLC‑4E)	Success (OCISLY)	Landed on LZ-4
B1097	F9 B5	14	November 22, 2026	F9-704	66 days	NROL-136	Success (SLC‑4E)	Success (LZ‑4)	Landed on LZ-4
B1099	FH core	Planned	?	-	—N/a	?	Planned (LC‑39A)	—N/a	Awaiting Assignment
B1100	F9 B5	11	November 23, 2025	F9-568	—N/a	Starlink x 28 (Group 11-30)	Success (SLC‑4E)	Success (OCISLY)	At Port of Long Beach
B1100	F9 B5	11	January 17, 2026	F9-589	55 days	NROL-105	Success (SLC‑4E)	Success (LZ‑4)	At Port of Long Beach
B1100	F9 B5	11	February 11, 2026	F9-598	25 days	Starlink x 24 (Group 17-34)	Success (SLC‑4E)	Success (OCISLY)	At Port of Long Beach
B1100	F9 B5	11	March 20, 2026	F9-618	37 days	Starlink x 25 (Group 17-15)	Success (SLC‑4E)	Success (OCISLY)	At Port of Long Beach
B1100	F9 B5	11	April 23, 2026	F9-631	34 days	Starlink x 24 (Group 17-14)	Success (SLC‑4E)	Success (OCISLY)	At Port of Long Beach
B1100	F9 B5	11	May 26, 2026	F9-642	33 days	Starlink x 24 (Group 17-37)	Success (SLC‑4E)	Success (OCISLY)	At Port of Long Beach
B1100	F9 B5	11	July 2, 2026	F9-659	37 days	Starlink x 24 (Group 17-46)	Success (SLC‑4E)	Success (OCISLY)	At Port of Long Beach
B1100	F9 B5	11	July 25, 2026	F9-669	23 days	Starlink x 24 (Group 17-51)	Success (SLC‑4E)	Success (OCISLY)	At Port of Long Beach
B1100	F9 B5	11	August 22, 2026	F9-681	28 days	Starlink x 27 (Group 15-20)	Success (SLC‑4E)	Success (OCISLY)	At Port of Long Beach
B1100	F9 B5	11	September 26, 2026	F9-690	35 days	USSF-385 ("R-3")	Success (SLC‑4E)	Success (OCISLY)	At Port of Long Beach
B1100	F9 B5	11	November 21, 2026	F9-703	56 days	USSF-317 ("R-6")	Success (SLC‑4E)	Success (OCISLY)	At Port of Long Beach
B1101	F9 B5	3	January 4, 2026	F9-584	—N/a	Starlink x 29 (Group 6-88)	Success (SLC‑40)	Success (JRTI)	Awaiting assignment
B1101	F9 B5	3	February 13, 2026	F9-599	40 days	Crew-12 (Dragon C212‑5 Freedom)	Success (SLC‑40)	Success (LZ‑40)	Awaiting assignment
B1101	F9 B5	3	October 1, 2026	F9-691	230 days	Crew-13 (Dragon C213‑2 Grace)	Success (SLC‑40)	Success (LZ‑40)	Awaiting assignment
B1103	F9 B5	7	April 7, 2026	F9-624	—N/a	Starlink x 25 (Group 17-35)	Success (SLC‑4E)	Success (OCISLY)	Awaiting assignment
B1103	F9 B5	7	May 20, 2026	F9-639	43 days	Starlink x 24 (Group 17-42)	Success (SLC‑4E)	Success (OCISLY)	Awaiting assignment
B1103	F9 B5	7	June 19, 2026	F9-653	30 days	NROL-179	Success (SLC‑4E)	Success (LZ‑4)	Awaiting assignment
B1103	F9 B5	7	July 16, 2026	F9-666	27 days	SDA Tranche 1 Transport Layer E	Success (SLC‑4E)	Success (OCISLY)	Awaiting assignment
B1103	F9 B5	7	August 12, 2026	F9-676	27 days	Starlink x 24 (Group 17-49)	Success (SLC‑4E)	Success (OCISLY)	Awaiting assignment
B1103	F9 B5	7	October 10, 2026	F9-693	59 days	SDA Tranches 1 Transport Layer A	Success (SLC‑4E)	Success (LZ‑4)	Awaiting assignment
B1103	F9 B5	7	November 12, 2026	F9-702	31 days	USSF-627 ("R-5")	Success (SLC‑4E)	Success (OCISLY)	Awaiting assignment
B1104	FH side	2	August 30, 2026	FH-013	—N/a	Nancy Grace Roman Space Telescope	Success (LC‑39A)	Success (LZ‑40)	Awaiting assignment
B1104	FH side	2	October 2, 2026	FH-014	33 days	NROL-97	Success (LC‑39A)	Success (LZ‑1)	Awaiting assignment

== Statistics ==
Rockets from the Falcon 9 family have a success rate of 99.58% and have been launched 717 times over 16 years, resulting in 714 full successes, two in-flight failures (SpaceX CRS-7 and Starlink Group 9–3), one pre-flight failure (AMOS-6 while being prepared for an on-pad static fire test), and one partial failure (SpaceX CRS-1, which delivered its cargo to the International Space Station (ISS), but a secondary payload was stranded in a lower-than-planned orbit). The active version of the rocket, the Falcon 9 Block 5, has flown 646 times successfully and failed once (Starlink Group 9–3), resulting in a 99.85% success rate.

In 2022, the Falcon 9 set a new record with 60 successful launches by the same launch vehicle type in a calendar year. This surpassed the previous record held by Soyuz-U, which had 47 launches (45 successful) in 1979. In 2023, the Falcon family of rockets (including the Falcon Heavy) had 96 successful launches, surpassing the 63 launches (61 successful) of the R-7 rocket family in 1980. (Note: There was also an on-pad explosion of an R-7 family rocket; sometimes it is counted as a launch, resulting in 64 launches.) In 2024, SpaceX broke their own record with 134 total Falcon flights (133 successful) accounting for over half of all orbital launches that year. In 2025, SpaceX broke their own record again with 165 total Falcon flights (165 successful).

The Falcon 9 has evolved through several versions: v1.0 was launched five times from 2010 to 2013, v1.1 launched 15 times from 2013 to 2016, Full Thrust launched 36 times from 2015 to 2018. The most recent version, Block 5, was introduced in May 2018. With each iteration, the Falcon 9 boosters have become more powerful and capable of vertical landing, while fairings simultaneously performing water landing, before being scooped out of water. As vertical landings and fairing recovery operations became more commonplace, SpaceX focused on streamlining the refurbishment process for boosters and fairings, making it faster and more cost-effective.

The Falcon Heavy derivative is a heavy-lift launch vehicle composed of three Falcon 9 first-stage boosters. The central core is reinforced, while the side boosters feature aerodynamic nosecone instead of the usual interstage.

Falcon 9 first-stage boosters landed successfully in 676 of 689 attempts (98.11%), with 651 out of 657 (99.09%) for the Falcon 9 Block 5 version. A total of 649 re-flights of first stage boosters have all successfully launched their second stages and, all but one, their payloads.

=== Rocket configurations ===
- Falcon 9 v1.0
- Falcon 9 v1.1
- Falcon 9 Full Thrust
- Falcon 9 FT (reused)
- Falcon 9 Block 5
- Falcon 9 Block 5 (reused)
- Falcon Heavy

=== Launch sites ===
- Cape Canaveral, SLC-40
- Kennedy, LC-39A
- Vandenberg, SLC-4E

=== Launch outcomes ===
- Loss before launch
- Loss during flight
- Partial failure
- Success (commercial and government)
- Success (Starlink)
- Planned (commercial and government)
- Planned (Starlink)

=== Booster landings ===
- Ground-pad failure
- Drone-ship failure
- Ocean test failure (Note: Controlled descent; ocean touchdown control failed; no recovery)
- Parachute test failure (Note: Passive reentry failed before parachute deployment)
- Ground-pad success
- Drone-ship success
- Ocean test success (Note: Controlled descent; soft vertical ocean touchdown; no recovery)
- No attempt

=== Booster turnaround time ===
This chart displays the turnaround time, in months, between two flights of each booster. As of November 21, 2026, the shortest turnaround time was 9 days, 3 hours, 39 minutes and 28 seconds, for the fourth flight of B1088. Boosters that are still likely to be re-used (active fleet) are highlighted in bold.

- Falcon 9 FT v1.2
- FT v1.2–Heavy sides (Note: Full Thrust Boosters B1023 and B1025 were converted to side boosters for the Falcon Heavy test flight of February 2018. This configuration will never fly again, as future Falcon Heavy missions have used a modified variant of Block 5 modules as side boosters.)
- Block 4
- Block 5–Heavy side flight 2
- Block 5 flight 2
- Block 5 flight 3
- Block 5–Heavy core reflight
- Block 5 flight 4
- Block 5 flight 5
- Block 5 flight 6
- Block 5 flight 7
- Block 5 flight 8
- Block 5 flight 9
- Block 5 flight 10
- Block 5 flight 11
- Block 5 flight 12
- Block 5 flight 13
- Block 5 flight 14
- Block 5 flight 15
- Block 5 flight 16
- Block 5 flight 17
- Block 5 flight 18
- Block 5 flight 19
- Block 5 flight 20
- Block 5 flight 21
- Block 5–Heavy side flight 2
- Block 5–Heavy side flight 3
- Block 5–Heavy side flight 4
- Block 5–Heavy side flight 5
- Block 5–Heavy side flight 6
- Block 5 flight 22
- Block 5 flight 23
- Block 5 flight 24
- Block 5 flight 25
- Block 5 flight 26
- Block 5 flight 27
- Block 5 flight 28
- Block 5 flight 29
- Block 5 flight 30
- Block 5 flight 31
- Block 5 flight 32
- Block 5 flight 33
- Block 5 flight 34
- Block 5 flight 35
- Block 5 flight 36
- Block 5 flight 37
- Block 5 flight 38

=== Full Thrust booster flight counts ===
This chart lists how often boosters were flown. It is limited to the Full Thrust versions as previous versions were never recovered intact. The entries for Block 5 include active boosters that can make additional flights in the future. Blocks 1–3 made 27 flights with 18 boosters (1.5 flights per booster), Block 4 made 12 flights with 7 boosters (1.7 flights per booster). As of November 21, 2026, Block 5 made 647 flights with 39 boosters (16.6 flights per booster) with Falcon 9.

- FT Block 1-3
- FT Block 4
- FT Block 5

==== Block 5 booster flight status ====
This chart shows how many Block 5 boosters have had N flights, and their status: whether they are still active, expended (i.e. no attempt was made to recover) or destroyed (i.e. recovery of the booster failed).

- Expended FH core
- Expended FH sides (4)
- Expended, other (10)
- Destroyed (9)
- Falcon 9 active (21)
- FH side active
- Converted Falcon 9/FH side active (B1077)
- Converted Falcon 9/FH core active (B1091)

The F9 booster expended after 1 use was B1054, (GPS III SV01 to MEO, Dec 2018).
The three boosters destroyed on their first flight include two FH cores : B1055 (fell off ship, Apr 2019) and B1057 (ADS landing fail, June 2019).

=== Falcon 9 FT booster timeline ===
This timeline displays all launches of Falcon 9 boosters starting with the first launch of Full Thrust. Active boosters that are expected to make additional flights in the future are marked with an asterisk. Single flights are marked with vertical lines. A short white gap indicates conversion between Falcon 9 and Falcon Heavy side formats. For boosters having performed several launches, colored bars indicate the turnaround time for each flight.

=== Synchronized recoveries of side-boosters ===
Most Falcon Heavy flights include landing of two side boosters onshore at the same time:

1. Falcon Heavy test flight
2. Arabsat-6A
3. STP-2
4. USSF-44
5. USSF-67
6. Jupiter-3 (EchoStar XXIV)
7. Psyche
8. USSF-52
9. GOES-19
10. ViaSat-3 F3
11. Roman Space Telescope

== Notable boosters ==
=== Grasshopper ===
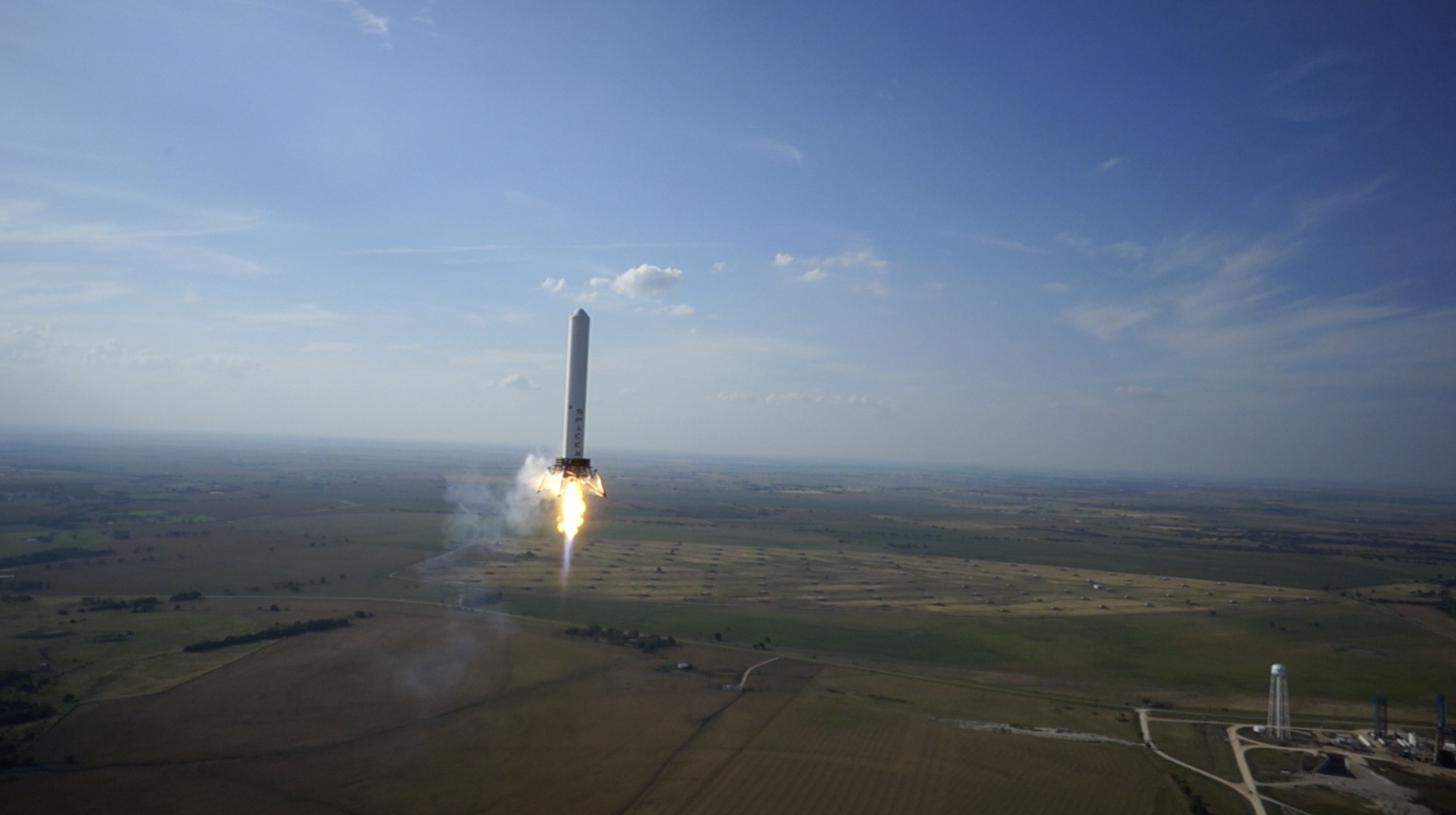
Grasshopper performing a 325-meter (1,066 ft) flight

Grasshopper consisted of "a Falcon 9 first-stage tank, a single Merlin-1D engine" with a height of 32 m (105 ft). The booster used for Grasshopper had the serial number 0002.

Grasshopper began flight testing in September 2012 with a brief, three-second hop, followed by a second hop in November 2012 with an 8-second flight that took the testbed approximately 5.4 m (18 ft) off the ground, and a third flight in December 2012 of 29 seconds duration, with extended hover under rocket engine power, in which it ascended to an altitude of 40 m (130 ft) before descending under rocket power to come to a successful vertical landing. Grasshopper made its eighth, and final, test flight on October 7, 2013, flying to an altitude of 744 m (2,441 ft) before making its eighth successful vertical landing. Grasshopper is retired.

=== Booster 1019 ===
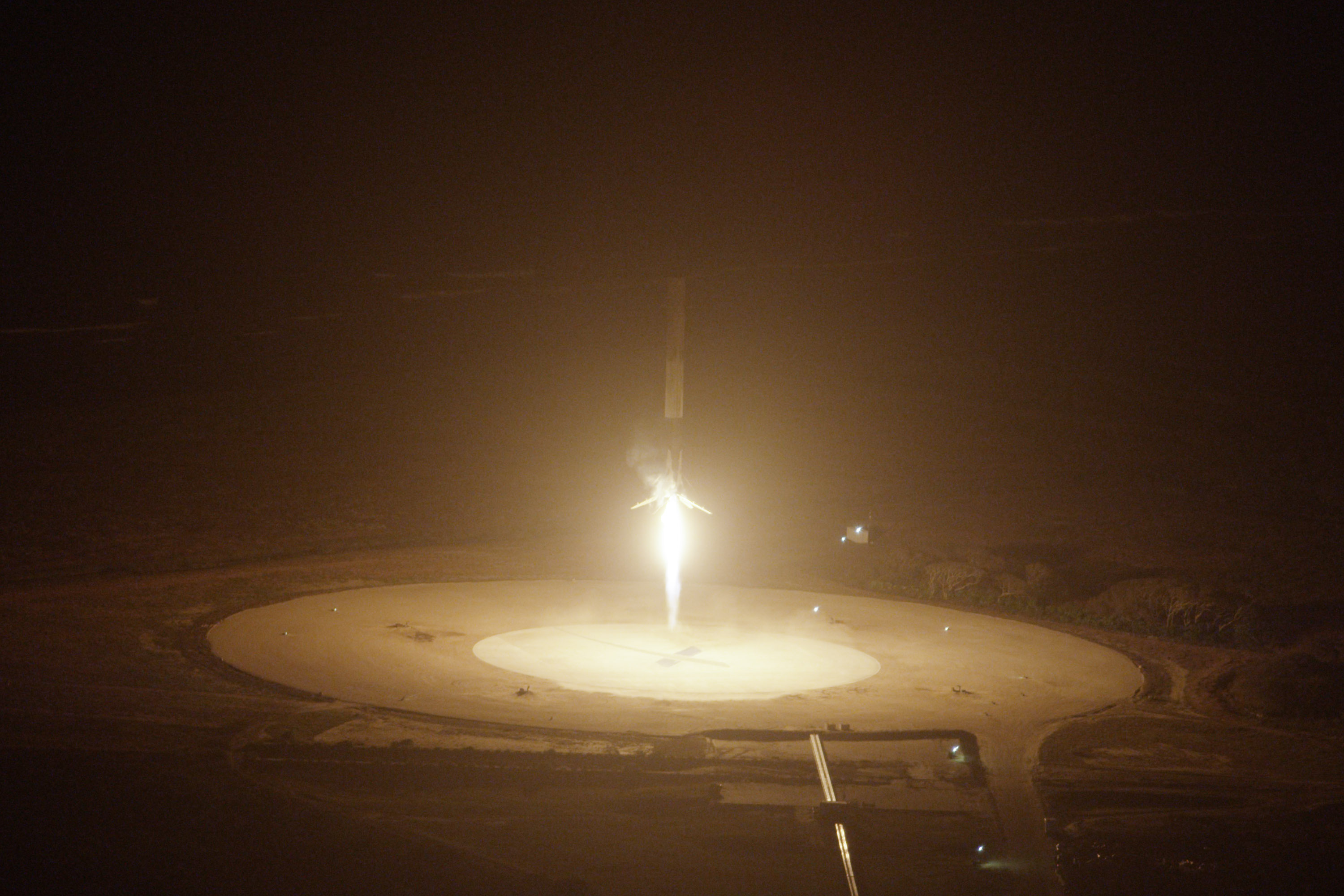
Booster 1019 immediately before touchdown at Landing Zone 1

Falcon 9 B1019 was the first Full Thrust booster, and was first launched on December 22, 2015, for Falcon 9 flight 20 and landed on the Landing Zone 1 (LZ‑1) at Cape Canaveral. It became the first orbital-class rocket booster to perform a successful return to launch site and vertical landing.

SpaceX decided not to fly the booster again. Rather, the rocket was moved a few miles north, refurbished by SpaceX at the adjacent Kennedy Space Center, to conduct a static fire test. This test aimed to assess the health of the recovered booster and the capability of this rocket design to fly repeatedly in the future. The historic booster is on display outside SpaceX headquarters in Hawthorne, California.

=== Booster 1021 ===
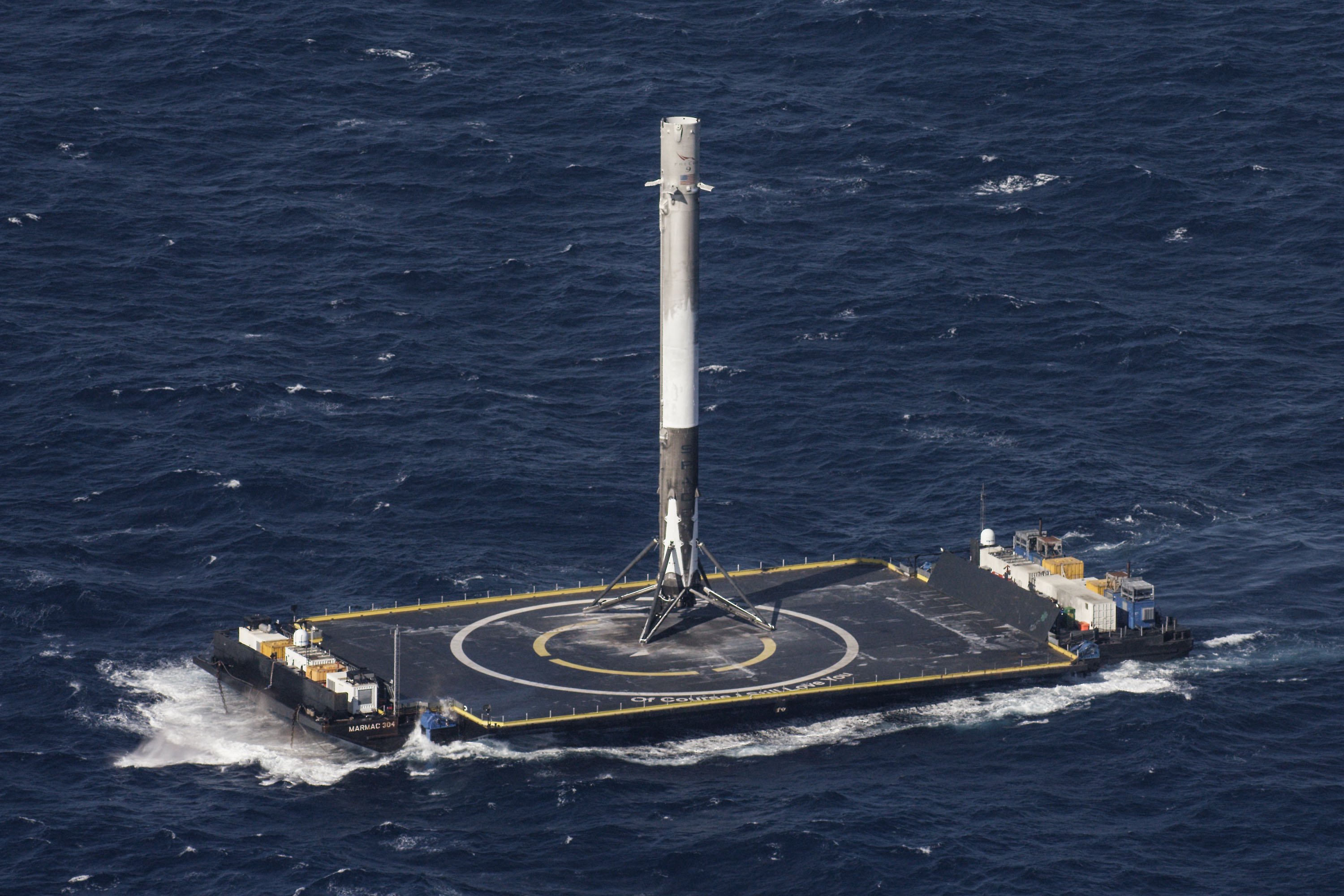
Booster 1021 aboard the Of Course I Still Love You drone ship after landing from the SpaceX CRS-8 mission

Falcon 9 B1021 was the first booster to be re-flown and the first to land on a droneship. It was first launched on April 8, 2016, carrying a Dragon spacecraft and Bigelow Expandable Activity Module (BEAM) on the SpaceX CRS-8 mission and landed on an autonomous spaceport drone ship (ASDS). After recovery, inspections and refurbishing, it was launched again on March 30, 2017, for the SES-10 mission and recovered successfully a second time. This event marks a milestone in SpaceX's drive to develop reusable rockets and reduce launch costs. Following the second flight, SpaceX stated that they plan to retire this booster and donate it to Cape Canaveral for public display. It was later put on public display outside Dish Network's headquarters in Littleton, Colorado in October 2023.

=== Boosters 1023 and 1025 ===
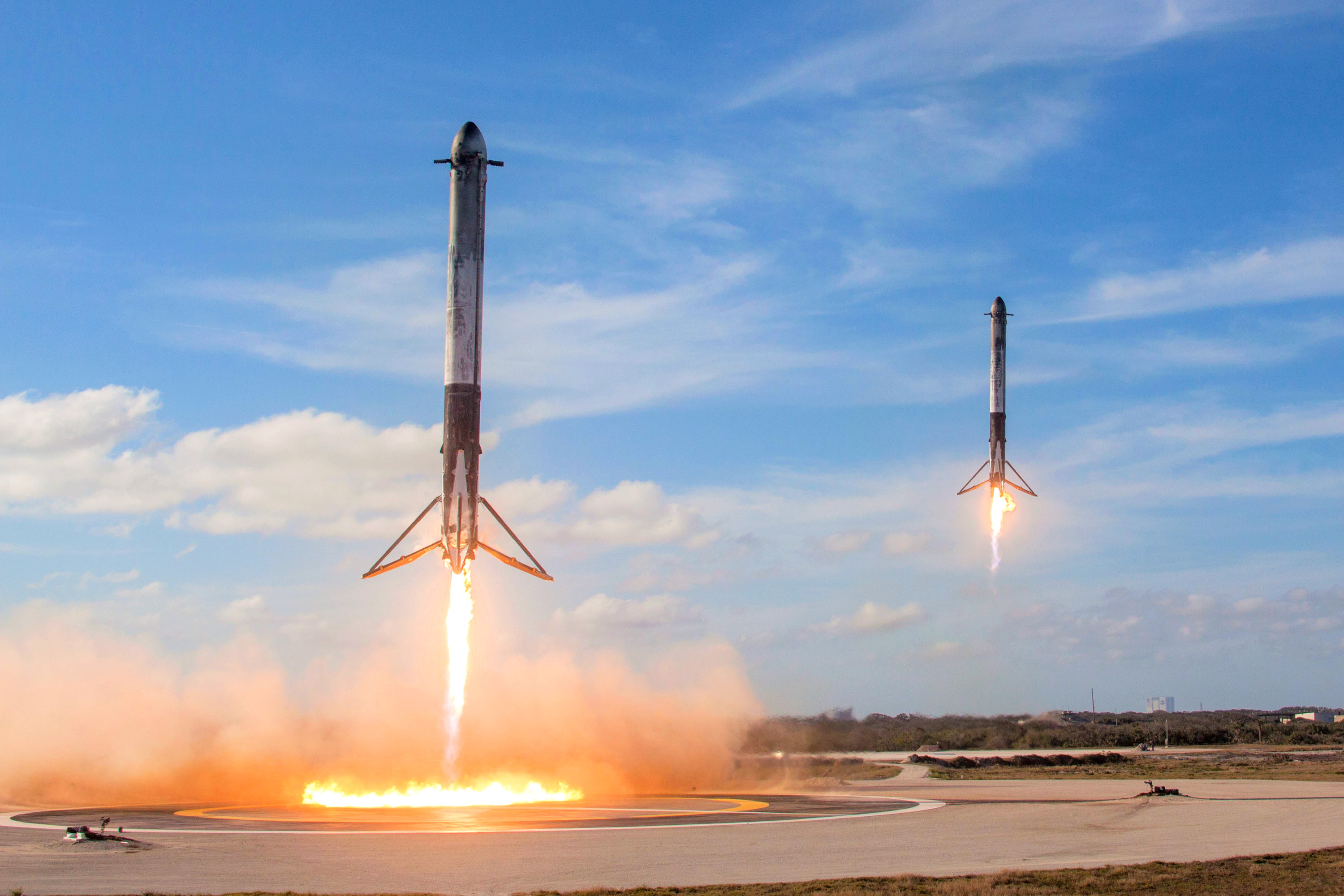
Boosters 1023 (left) and 1025 (right) landing simultaneously at Landing Zones 1 and 2 after completing the Falcon Heavy Demonstration Mission

B1023 became the third orbital-class rocket to land on a droneship after launching Thaicom 8 into a geostationary transfer orbit on May 27, 2016. It was an unusually hard landing that crushed the energy absorbers on at least one of the landing legs, causing the booster to "walk" across the droneship and lean over, but the rocket arrived safely at Port Canaveral. B1025 successfully launched the CRS-9 resupply mission on its maiden flight on July 18, 2016, and landed on LZ-1, being the first after B1019 to do so. The mission carried a new docking adapter specifically designed for autonomous spacecraft to the ISS in preparation for Dragon 2 resupply and Commercial Crew missions.

B1023 and B1025 were assigned the role of side boosters for the Falcon Heavy test flight in 2017, after which they underwent separate static fire tests. The boosters were mated to a newly built Falcon Heavy core, B1033, for the flight. The maiden flight of Falcon Heavy on February 6, 2018, launched SpaceX CEO Elon Musk's Tesla Roadster and a dummy astronaut into a Mars-crossing heliocentric orbit. The boosters successfully separated from the core and performed synchronized landings on LZ-1 and LZ-2. B1033 failed to land on the droneship due to running out of ignition fluid which resulted in two of three engines failing to ignite for its landing burn. The droneship suffered minor damage.

B1023 is on display at the Kennedy Space Center Visitor Complex in its Falcon Heavy side booster configuration.

=== Booster 1046 ===
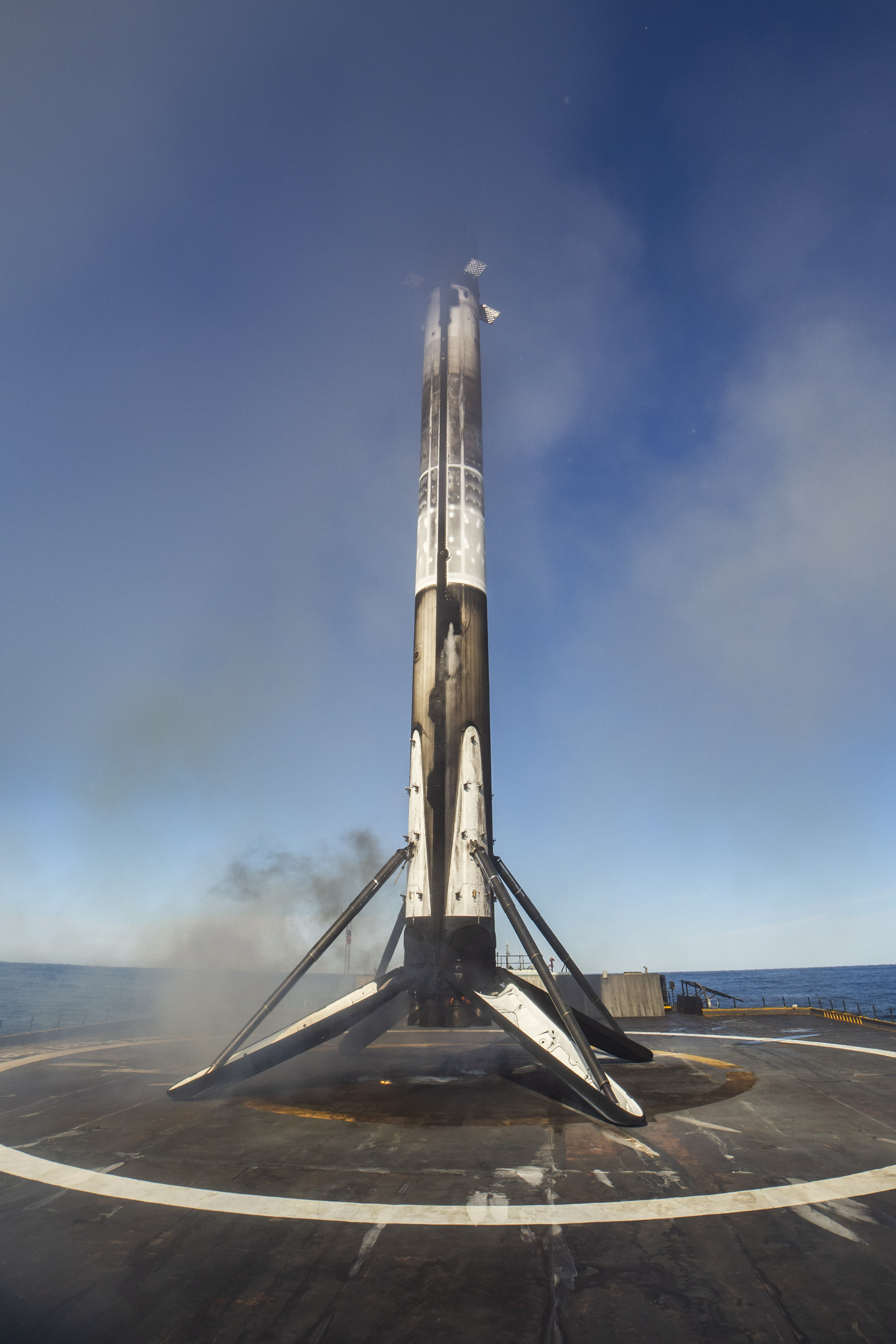
Booster 1046 standing on Just Read the Instructions after successfully launching and landing three times

B1046 was the first Block 5, the final version of the SpaceX Falcon 9. It was first launched on May 11, 2018, carrying Bangabandhu-1, Bangladesh's first geostationary communications satellite. This marked the 54th flight of the Falcon 9 and the first flight of the Falcon 9 Block 5. After completing a successful ascent, B1046 landed on the drone ship Of Course I Still Love You. After inspection and refurbishment, B1046 was launched a second time on August 7, 2018, carrying the Telkom-4 (Merah Putih) satellite. The Telkom-4 mission marked the first time an orbital-class rocket booster launched two GTO missions. This was also the first re-flight of a Block 5 booster. Four months after the Telkom-4 mission, B1046 arrived at Vandenberg Air Force Base to support the SSO-A mission. Following delays for additional satellite checks, liftoff occurred from SLC-4E on December 3, 2018. This marked the first time that the same orbital-class booster flew three times. Its fourth and last mission launched a Crew Dragon capsule up to the point of maximum dynamic pressure, where it separated from the rocket to test its abort system in flight to validate the system's safety for crews. After separation of Falcon and Dragon, B1046 was destroyed by aerodynamic forces.

=== Booster 1048 ===
B1048 was the third Falcon 9 Block 5 to fly and the second Block 5 booster to re-fly, and the first booster ever to be launched four, then five times. During the last launch, an engine shut down seconds before the planned shutdown, becoming only the second time a Merlin engine failed since the failure during the SpaceX CRS-1 in October 2012. The primary mission was unaffected and the Starlink payload deployed successfully, further confirming the reliability of the rocket due to redundancy of the engines. With reduced thrust, B1048 was unable to sufficiently slow down its descent, and thus was unable to land.

=== Booster 1049 ===
B1049 was the oldest Falcon 9 booster on active duty until its last flight on November 22, 2022, after which this title went to B1052. It was the first to successfully launch and land six, then seven times, and the second to launch and land eight, nine, and then ten times respectively. It launched two commercial payloads, Telstar 18V and the eighth Iridium NEXT batch, and eight internal Starlink batches. B1049 was seen with its landing legs and grid fins removed indicating that it would be expended on its next flight. The final flight of B1049 was originally thought to be O3b mPower 4-6 but a regrouping of the launches meant that an expendable booster was no longer required. It was then planned that B1049's last flight would be the launch of Nilesat-301 however, those plans changed and the mission was flown with a recoverable booster (B1062.7). B1049 flew the Eutelsat-10B communications satellite with a Test/Spare Block 4 interstage on November 22, 2022. This mission was its last flight.

=== Booster 1050 ===
B1050 launched for the first time on December 5, 2018. A grid fin malfunction occurred shortly after the entry burn, resulting in the booster performing a controlled landing in the ocean instead of the planned ground pad landing.

No future flights for B1050 were planned, and it was scrapped due to its damage, with some parts being recycled into the Starhopper test vehicle.

=== Booster 1051 ===
B1051 was the sixth Falcon 9 Block 5 booster built. On its maiden flight on March 2, 2019, it carried a Crew Dragon into orbit on the Demo-1 mission. It then flew its second mission out of Vandenberg AFB launching the Radarsat constellation. It then flew 4 Starlink missions and launched SXM-7, totaling 5 flights in 2020 alone, and becoming the first Falcon 9 to launch a commercial payload on its seventh flight. On December 18, 2021, it flew for a record 11th time. It was the first booster to be used eight, nine, ten, eleven, and twelve times respectively. It flew for the final time on November 12, 2022, for the Intelsat G-31/G-32 mission, and was expended.

=== Booster 1056 ===
B1056 first launched on May 4, 2019, carrying a Cargo Dragon to the ISS. Because of the failure of the static test fire of Crew Dragon C204's Super-Draco abort engines on LZ-1, it landed on a drone ship instead. It flew three more times. On February 17, 2020, B1056 was planned to perform the 50th orbital-class rocket landing, just 27 days after its previous launch. The booster soft-landed in the Atlantic Ocean and was severely damaged after launching Starlink satellites into orbit, becoming the first flight-proven Block 5 booster to fail landing.

=== Booster 1058 ===
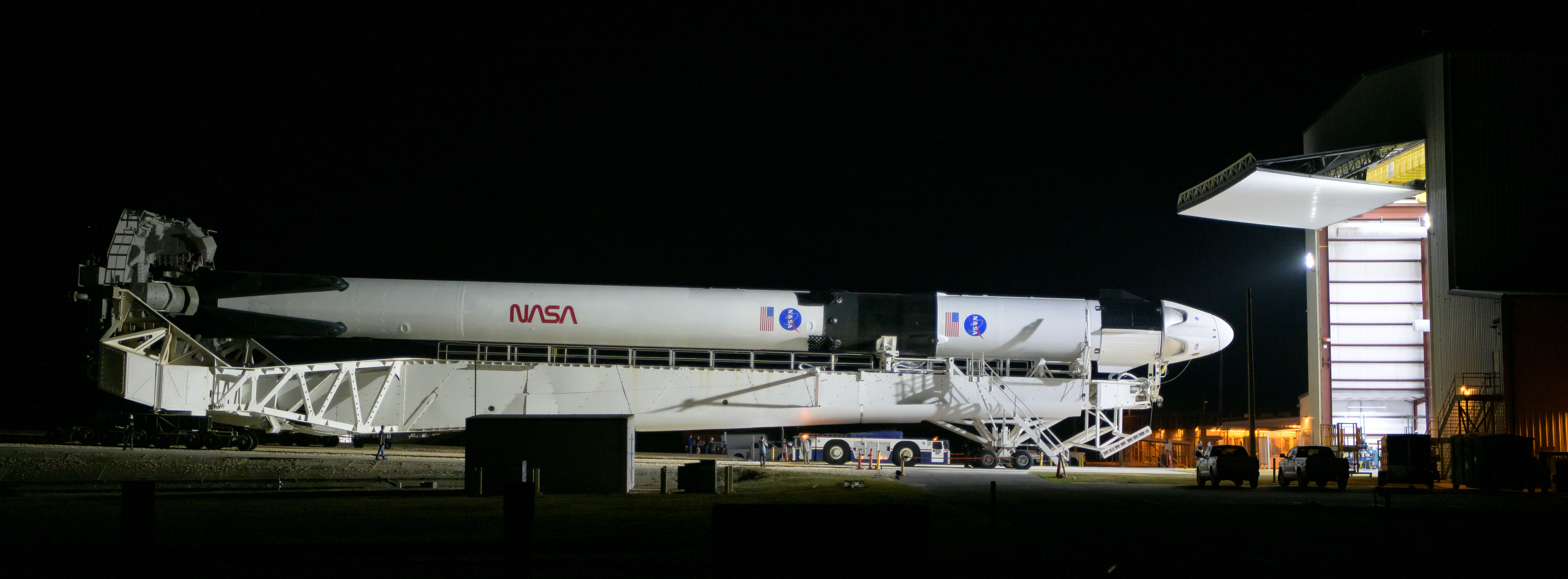
Booster 1058 and Crew Dragon Endeavour rolling out to the launch pad, bearing the NASA "worm" logo

Falcon 9 B1058 was first launched on May 30, 2020, from Kennedy Space Center Launch Complex 39A (Apollo 11 launch site). It carried NASA astronauts Doug Hurley and Bob Behnken to the International Space Station. It was the first crewed orbital spaceflight launched from the United States since the final Space Shuttle mission, and the first crewed flight test of Dragon 2. It was the first crewed orbital spaceflight by a private company. The booster was the first and only Falcon 9 booster to feature NASA's worm logo and meatball insignia, which was reintroduced after last being used in 1992.

On September 11, 2022, it flew for the 14th time and became the first booster to be recovered 14 times. On December 17, 2022, it was also the first booster to fly and land for the 15th time. On July 10, 2023, it broke the reusability record of flying and landing an orbital-class rocket booster for the 16th time and later went on to be the first to complete 17, 18, and 19 launches in the same year.

Despite the successful landing in its nineteenth flight, the booster tipped over during transit due to rough seas and high winds. SpaceX has already equipped newer Falcon boosters with upgraded landing legs that have the capability to self-level and mitigate this type of issue.

=== Booster 1060 ===
B1060 first flew on June 30, 2020, a month after Demo-2. Further missions it supported include launches of Starlink v1, v1.5 and v2 Mini, two Transporter ridesharing missions, and three large commercial satellites. After becoming the senior active rocket for SpaceX on December 25, 2023, it was assigned to what would become the first successful commercial Lunar landing: the booster launched IM-1 on February 15, 2024. This was its eighteenth mission.

=== Booster 1061 ===
Falcon 9 B1061 first launched Crew-1 to the ISS on November 16, 2020, the first operational flight of Crew Dragon, and landed on a drone ship. It became the first booster to fly crew twice as well as the first reused booster to fly crew as a part of the Crew-2 mission. This first stage went on to complete additional missions. B1061 is the only booster to land on all of SpaceX's different landing zones and drone ships (not including LZ-2). It was expended on the ESA Hera launch on October 7, 2024. Booster 1061 flew a total of 23 flights, making it tied with B1062 for the most-flown Falcon 9 booster to be expended.

=== Booster 1062 ===
Falcon 9 B1062 launched Inspiration4 in 2021, operated by SpaceX on behalf of Shift4 Payments CEO Jared Isaacman. The mission launched the Crew Dragon Resilience on September 16, 2021, at 00:02:56 UTC (Note: September 15, 2021, 20:02:56 Eastern Daylight Time (EDT)) from the Florida Kennedy Space Center's Launch Complex 39A atop a Falcon 9 launch vehicle, placed the Dragon capsule into low Earth orbit, and ended successfully on September 18, 2021, at 23:06:49 UTC, when the Resilience splashed down in the Atlantic Ocean. B1062 held the record for the fastest booster turnaround time at 21 days and 4 hours between April 8, 2022 (Axiom-1) and April 29, 2022 (Starlink Group 4–16) beating the previous record of 27 days and 6 hours held by B1060. This was the first time a booster had flown twice in the same calendar month. According to the SpaceX webcast of the Starlink Group 4-16 mission, the booster spent just nine days in refurbishment. This record withstood until B1080 broke it by launching within 14 days between November 11–24, 2024. This booster was the first booster to achieve 20 launches and landings. This booster completed 22 successful launch and landings, before tipping over on its 23rd landing on the droneship A Shortfall of Gravitas during the Starlink 8-6 mission.

=== Booster 1069 ===
Falcon 9 B1069, dubbed as OG Tippy Rocket, launched SpaceX CRS-24 to ISS in December 2021 for NASA. SpaceX achieved the feat of 100 successful orbital rocket booster landings in this mission, coinciding with the sixth anniversary of its first booster landing. The rough seas led to the Octagrabber robot not being able to secure the booster to the deck, leading to both the booster, droneship and the Octagrabber robot being heavily damaged in transit. It took months for SpaceX to refurbish B1069, returning into service only on Group 4-23 mission in August 2022.

On its next flight for Eutelsat Hotbird 13F, B1069 included a hosted promotional payload by FIFA, that was a box powered by Starlink containing two Adidas Al Rihla (the Journey) balls, that were to be used in 2022 FIFA World Cup in Qatar. These match balls were launched and brought back by landing on the drone-ship surviving the stresses of re-entry. Later, they were taken out and shipped back to Qatar for the World Cup. This was the first payload on a Falcon 9 booster itself and demonstrated the reusability. The balls' flight by SpaceX was, in part, a promotion for the company's Starlink satellite internet service. An associated website invited World Cup attendees to visit the Starlink office in Doha.

== Reuse and recovery records ==
- B1012 featured the first recovery attempt on a drone-ship on January 10, 2015. The attempt was unsuccessful.
- B1019 became the first orbital booster ever to be recovered after a launch. After it landed at LZ-1 on December 22, 2015, it was retired and put on display at SpaceX Headquarters in Hawthorne, California.
- B1021 became the first booster ever to land on a drone-ship. On April 8, 2016, B1021 touched down on the drone ship Of Course I Still Love You, marking SpaceX's second successful landing.
- B1021 became the first booster to fly a second time, on F9 Flight 32 when it launched the SES-10 satellite on March 30, 2017. After its second successful landing, it was retired and put on display at Cape Canaveral Air Force Station.
- B1023 and B1025 achieved the first synchronized landings when they touched down together at LZ-1 and LZ-2 respectively after the Falcon Heavy Test Flight on February 6, 2018.
- B1046 (the first Block 5 booster) became the first to launch three times, carrying Spaceflight SSO-A on December 3, 2018.
- B1048 was the first booster to be recovered four times on November 11, 2019, and the first to perform a fifth flight on March 18, 2020, but the booster was lost during re-entry.
- B1049 was the first booster to be recovered five times on June 4, 2020, six times on August 18, 2020, and seven times on November 25, 2020.
- B1051 became the first booster to be recovered eight times on January 20, 2021, nine times on March 14, 2021, and ten times on May 9, 2021, achieving one of SpaceX's milestone goals for reuse. It then became the first booster to be recovered 11 times on December 18, 2021, and 12 times on March 19, 2022.
- B1060 became the first booster to fly 13 times on June 17, 2022.
- B1088 holds the record for fastest turnaround at 9 days, 3 hours, 39 minutes and 28 seconds. It launched on 12 March and again on March 21, 2025. First booster to launch and land thrice in 23 days, achieved on April 4, 2025.
- B1023 holds the record for the farthest downrange drone-ship landing from Falcon 9 at 681 km on May 27, 2016, and B1055 holds the record of 1236 km downrange from Falcon Heavy.
- B1058 became the first booster to fly 14 times on September 11, 2022, 15 times on December 17, 2022, 16 times on July 10, 2023, 17 times on September 20, 2023, 18 times on November 4, 2023, and 19 times on December 23, 2023.
- B1069 launched and returned a hosted box containing two FIFA 2022 World Cup Adidas Al Rihla on October 15, 2022, for a sub-orbital flight, the first payload on a Falcon 9 booster.
- B1061 became the only booster on December 30, 2022, to launch from all SpaceX's different launch sites and on all of SpaceX's different landing zones and drone ships (except rarely used LZ-2 that is located nearby LZ-1).
- B1080 became the first booster to land onshore after launching a crewed mission (Ax-2) on May 21, 2023. Before, all boosters of Dragon 2 missions, crew and cargo, landed on ships. As of May 2026, since Ax-2 all boosters of Dragon 2 missions landed onshore, except for Polaris Dawn and Fram2, which were launched to much higher orbit and higher inclination orbit respectively than usual.
- The fastest return of a droneship from the landing site to Port Canaveral is 50 hours achieved by A Shortfall of Gravitas, on the Starlink Group 6-46 mission.
- B1062 became the first booster to fly 20 times on April 13, 2024, 21 times on May 18, 2024, 22 times on June 27, 2024, and 23 times on August 28, 2024.
- The fastest landing-to-landing turnaround of a droneship is 84 hours achieved by A Shortfall of Gravitas, between the Starlink Group 6-60 and Group 6-64 missions.
- B1067 became the first booster to be recovered 23 times on November 11, 2024, and flown and recovered 24, 25, 26, 27, 28, 29, 30, 31, 32, 33, 34, 35, 36, and 37 times on December 4, 2024, January 10, 2025, February 15, 2025, April 14, 2025, May 13, 2025, July 2, 2025, August 28, 2025, October 19, 2025, December 8, 2025, February 22, 2026, March 30, 2026, June 8, 2026, July 9, 2026, and August 25, 2026, respectively.
- B1085 became the first booster to fly ten times in one calendar year on December 5, 2024.
- B1071 became the first booster to launch 1000 cumulative spacecraft on November 28, 2025.

== See also ==
- List of Falcon 9 and Falcon Heavy launches
  - List of Falcon 9 and Falcon Heavy launches (2010–2019)
  - List of Falcon 9 and Falcon Heavy launches (2020–2022)
  - List of Falcon 9 and Falcon Heavy launches (2023)
  - List of Falcon 9 and Falcon Heavy launches (2024)
- Lists of spacecraft
- List of Super Heavy boosters
- Category:Individual Falcon 9 boosters
