= Spaceflight, Inc. =

American aerospace company

- Industry: Aerospace
- Founder: Jason Andrews
- Headquarters: Seattle, Washington, U.S.
- Website: spaceflight.com

Spaceflight, Inc. is an American aerospace company based out of Seattle, Washington, that specializes in organizing rideshare space launches of secondary payloads. It was part of Spaceflight Industries until June 2020.

Spaceflight was founded in 2009, as Spaceflight Services by Jason Andrews, with Curt Blake joining soon thereafter as SVP and General Counsel. Prior to founding Spaceflight, Andrews worked at Kistler Aerospace and founded Andrews Space in 1999. Blake has previous experience at Microsoft, Starwave, SpaceDev, and GotVoice.

In 2015, Spaceflight Services, Spaceflight Systems (formerly Andrews Space), and Spaceflight Networks, were consolidated under the Spaceflight Industries brand.

Spaceflight Services purchased excess capacity from commercial launch vehicles and resold it to a number of "rideshare" secondary payloads, along with providing integration and certification services. By integrating all of the secondary satellites as one discrete unit to the launch vehicle, they were able to provide a significant price discount to reach orbit compared to buying an entire launch vehicle.

Launch payload sizes vary from 1 kg up to 300 kg micro-satellites and use a variety of space launch vehicles, such as Antares, Dnepr, Soyuz, and Falcon 9, as well as from the International Space Station.

Spaceflight is in the process of developing its SHERPA system, a space tug that uses a custom ring as its primary structure and includes a propulsion system and other spacecraft subsystems to operate as both a hosted payload platform and an in-space maneuvering stage to reposition small and secondary spacecraft. SHERPA enables more access to space for small spacecraft and hosted payloads, and would be able to transport rideshare payloads to the Moon and Mars.

In 2020, Spaceflight Industries sold Spaceflight, Inc. to Mitsui & Co. and Yamasa Co., Ltd., in order to invest more funds in its geospatial intelligence services business.

In November 2020, Spaceflight introduced its Sherpa-NG (next generation) program. This program contains a family of ESPA-class space vehicles designed to minimize development timelines while maximizing flight and schedule reliability and mission assurance. Currently, the program will consist of three vehicles: Sherpa-FX, Sherpa-LTC, and Sherpa-LTE.

Spaceflight is scheduled to launch its first next-generation orbital transfer vehicle (OTV) in January 2021 on a SpaceX Falcon 9. The mission, called SXRS-3, will launch 16 payloads, 14 of which will launch on the Sherpa-FX OTV, while the remaining two are integrated onto Sherpa-FX as hosted payloads. The Sherpa vehicles are seen as a revolutionary initiative towards opening up space access while tailoring launch experiences that reduce timelines and improve overall flexibility. The debut vehicle is capable of executing multiple deployments, providing independent and detailed deployment telemetry, and flexible interface, all at a low cost.

In 2023, Spaceflight Inc. was acquired by Firefly Aerospace.
