= List of Starlink and Starshield launches =

Satellite Internet constellation

Starlink
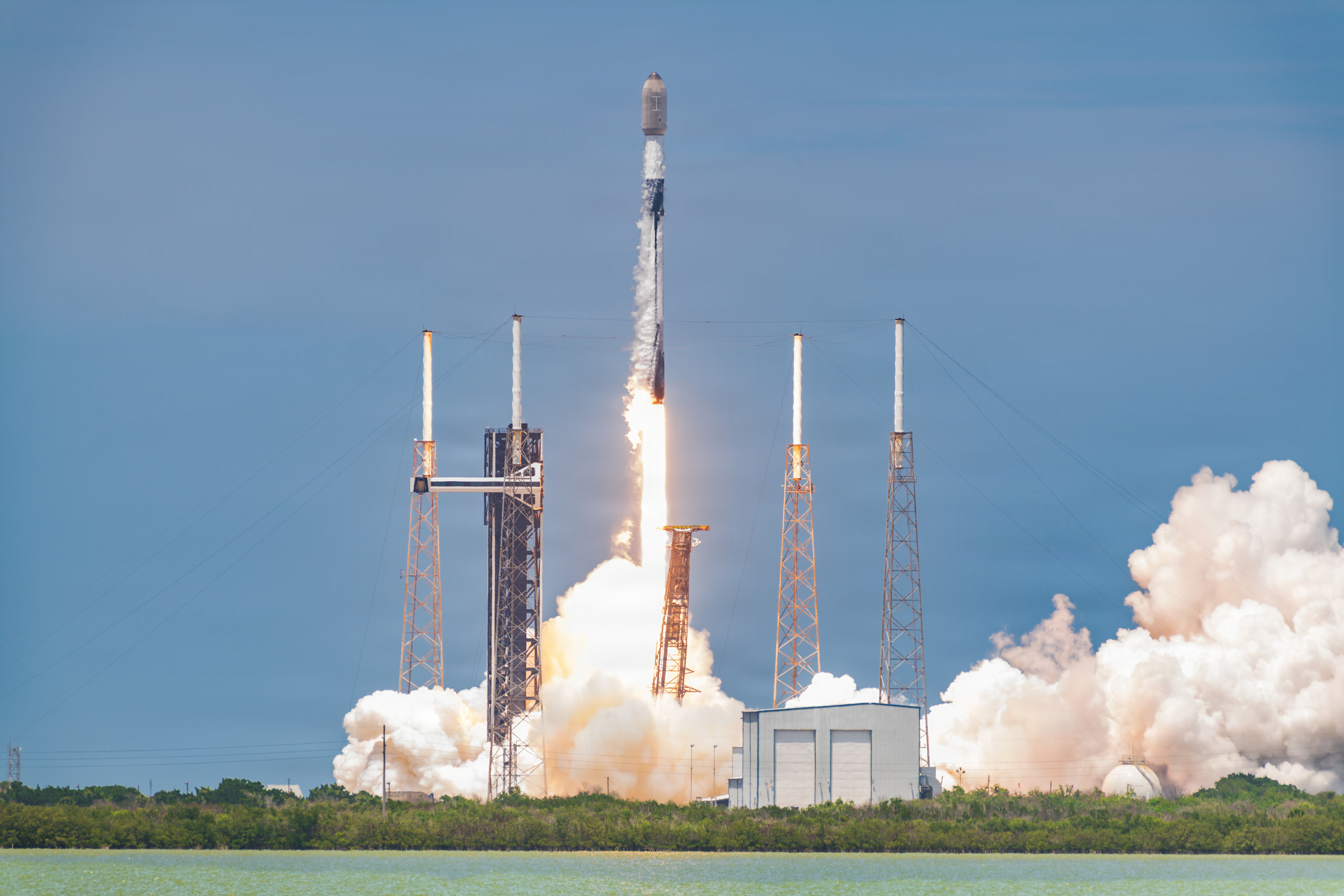
- A Falcon 9 launching Starlink 10-38 from SLC-40 in May 2026.
- Manufacturer: SpaceX
- Country of origin: United States
- Operator: SpaceX
- Applications: Satellite Internet access
- Website: starlink.com
- Project cost: $10 billion

Specifications
- Spacecraft type: Small satellite
- Launch mass: v0.9: 227 kg (500 lb); v1.0: 260 kg (570 lb); v1.5: 295–306 kg (650–675 lb); V2 mini: ~740 kg (1,630 lb); V2: ~1,250 kg (2,760 lb)
- Equipment: Ku-, Ka-, and E-band phased array antennas; Laser transponders (some units); Hall-effect thrusters
- Regime: LEO, SSO

Production
- Status: Active
- Launched: 13,070(as of 31 October 2026); Tintin: 2; v0.9: 60; v1.0: 1,665; v1.5: 2,987; v2 mini: 8,336; v2: 38; v3: 46
- Operational: 10,022 (as of 31 October 2026)
- Maiden launch: 22 February 2018

Configuration
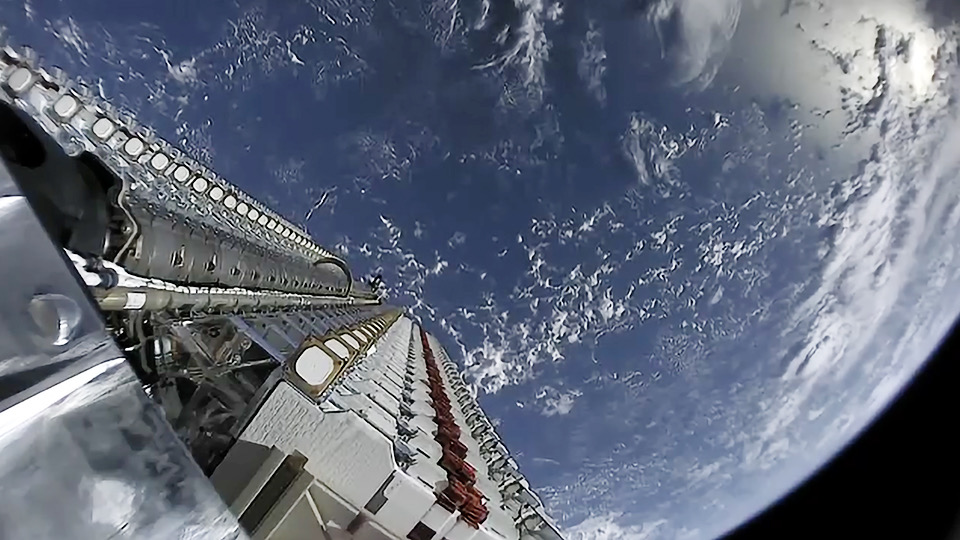
- 60 Starlink v0.9 satellites stacked together before deployment on 24 May 2019.

Starlink is a satellite internet constellation operated by SpaceX providing satellite Internet access to most of the Earth.

Starshield is a classified derivative of Starlink designed to be operated for, and which can host payloads for, military or government purposes.

== Falcon 9 launches ==
=== Starlink launches ===
The deployment of the first 1,440 satellites will be into 72 orbital planes of 20 satellites each, with a requested lower minimum elevation angle of beams to improve reception: 25° rather than the 40° of the other two orbital shells. SpaceX launched the first 60 satellites of the constellation in May 2019 into a 450 km (280 mi) orbit and expected up to six launches in 2019 at that time, with 720 satellites (12 × 60) for continuous coverage in 2020.

In August 2019, SpaceX expected four more launches in 2019 and at least nine launches in 2020, but since January 2020 expectations had increased to 24 total launches in 2020.

In March 2020, SpaceX reported producing six satellites per day.

In February 2021, Musk stated that the satellites are traveling on 25 orbital planes clustered between 53° north and south of the equator.

Starlink launches
No.	Mission	Sat. ver.	COSPAR ID	Launch date, time (UTC)	Launch site	Orbit		Satellites			Outcome	Remarks
No.	Mission	Sat. ver.	COSPAR ID	Launch date, time (UTC)	Launch site	Altitude	Inclination	Deployed	w/DtC	Working	Outcome	Remarks
–	Tintin	v0.1	2018–020	22 February 2018, 14:17	Vandenberg, SLC-4E	514 km (319 mi)	97.5°	2		0	Success	Two test satellites known as Tintin A and B (MicroSat-2a and 2b) that were deployed as co-payloads to the Paz satellite. As of 1 September 2020, the orbits have decayed and both satellites have reentered the atmosphere.
1	v0.9	v0.9	2019–029	24 May 2019, 02:30	Cape Canaveral, SLC-40	440–550 km (270–340 mi)	53.0°	60		0	Success	First launch of 60 Starlink test satellites. Said to be "production design", these are used to test various aspects of the network, including deorbiting. They do not yet have the planned satellite interlink capabilities and they only communicate with antennas on Earth. A day after launch an amateur astronomer in the Netherlands was one of the first to publish a video showing the satellites flying across the sky as a "train" of bright lights. By five weeks post launch, 57 of the 60 satellites had been "healthy" while 3 were non-operational and derelict, but deorbited due to atmospheric drag. All working satellites were intentionally deorbited by May 2021, and all remaining failed spacecraft re-entered by October 2022.
2	Launch 1	v1	2019–074	11 November 2019, 14:56	Cape Canaveral, SLC-40	550 km (340 mi)	53.0°	60		43	Success	First launch of Starlink "operational" satellites (v1.0), with an increased mass of 260 kg each and included Ka-band antennas. Satellites were released in a circular orbit at around 290 km altitude, from which the satellites raised their altitude by themselves.
3	Launch 2	v1	2020–001	7 January 2020, 02:19:21	Cape Canaveral, SLC-40	550 km (340 mi)	53.0°	60		40	Success	One of the satellites, dubbed DarkSat, has an experimental coating to make it less reflective, and to reduce the impact on ground-based astronomical observations.
4	Launch 3	v1	2020–006	29 January 2020, 14:06	Cape Canaveral, SLC-40	550 km (340 mi)	53.0°	60		48	Success	
5	Launch 4	v1	2020–012	17 February 2020, 15:05	Cape Canaveral, SLC-40	550 km (340 mi)	53.0°	60		46	Success	First time the satellites were released in an elliptical orbit (212 × 386 km).
6	Launch 5	v1	2020–019	18 March 2020, 12:16:39	Kennedy, LC-39A	550 km (340 mi)	53.0°	60		54	Success	
7	Launch 6	v1	2020–025	22 April 2020, 19:30:30	Kennedy, LC-39A	550 km (340 mi)	53.0°	60		49	Success	
8	Launch 7	v1	2020–035	4 June 2020, 01:25:00	Cape Canaveral, SLC-40	550 km (340 mi)	53.0°	60		53	Success	One of the satellites, dubbed VisorSat, has a sunshade to reduce the impact on ground-based astronomical observations.
9	Launch 8	v1	2020–038	13 June 2020, 09:21:18	Cape Canaveral, SLC-40	550 km (340 mi)	53.0°	58		50	Success	First Starlink rideshare launch, carrying only 58 of SpaceX's satellites plus three Planet Labs, SkySats 16-18 Earth-observation satellites.
10	Launch 9	v1	2020–055	7 August 2020, 05:12:05	Kennedy, LC-39A	550 km (340 mi)	53.0°	57		54	Success	BlackSky Global 7 and 8, the 5th and 6th BlackSky Global satellites, launched as rideshare payloads. All of the Starlink satellites are outfitted with the sunshade visor that was tested on a single satellite on 4 June 2020 launch.
11	Launch 10	v1	2020–057	18 August 2020, 14:31:16	Cape Canaveral, SLC-40	550 km (340 mi)	53.0°	58		53	Success	Rideshare satellites from Planet Labs, SkySats 19-21 Earth-observation satellites.
12	Launch 11	v1	2020–062	3 September 2020, 12:46:14	Kennedy, LC-39A	550 km (340 mi)	53.0°	60		50	Success	
13	Launch 12	v1	2020–070	6 October 2020, 11:29:34	Kennedy, LC-39A	550 km (340 mi)	53.0°	60		50	Success	
14	Launch 13	v1	2020–073	18 October 2020, 12:25:57	Kennedy, LC-39A	550 km (340 mi)	53.0°	60		45	Success	
15	Launch 14	v1	2020–074	24 October 2020, 15:31:34	Cape Canaveral, SLC-40	550 km (340 mi)	53.0°	60		43	Success	
16	Launch 15	v1	2020–088	25 November 2020, 02:13:12	Cape Canaveral, SLC-40	550 km (340 mi)	53.0°	60		40	Success	
17	Launch 16	v1	2021–005	20 January 2021, 13:02:00	Kennedy, LC-39A	550 km (340 mi)	53.0°	60		57	Success	
–	Tr-1	v1	2021–006	24 January 2021, 15:00:00	Cape Canaveral, SLC-40	560 km (350 mi)	97.5°	10		0	Success	Part of Transporter-1 mission. First launch of production Starlink satellites to polar orbits.
18	Launch 18	v1	2021–009	4 February 2021, 06:19:00	Cape Canaveral, SLC-40	550 km (340 mi)	53.0°	60		56	Success	
19	Launch 19	v1	2021–012	16 February 2021, 03:59:37	Cape Canaveral, SLC-40	550 km (340 mi)	53.0°	60		57	Success	
20	Launch 17	v1	2021–017	4 March 2021, 08:24:54	Kennedy, LC-39A	550 km (340 mi)	53.0°	60		54	Success	Second stage failed to deorbit actively, reentered March 26 over Oregon and Washington in the United States.
21	Launch 20	v1	2021–018	11 March 2021, 08:13:29	Cape Canaveral, SLC-40	550 km (340 mi)	53.0°	60		59	Success	
22	Launch 21	v1	2021–021	14 March 2021, 10:01:26	Kennedy, LC-39A	550 km (340 mi)	53.0°	60		54	Success	
23	Launch 22	v1	2021–024	24 March 2021, 08:28:24	Cape Canaveral, SLC-40	550 km (340 mi)	53.0°	60		43	Success	
24	Launch 23	v1	2021–027	7 April 2021, 16:34:18	Cape Canaveral, SLC-40	550 km (340 mi)	53.0°	60		60	Success	
25	Launch 24	v1	2021–036	29 April 2021, 03:44:00	Cape Canaveral, SLC-40	550 km (340 mi)	53.0°	60		60	Success	
26	Launch 25	v1	2021–038	4 May 2021, 19:01	Kennedy, LC-39A	550 km (340 mi)	53.0°	60		60	Success	
27	Launch 27	v1	2021–040	9 May 2021, 06:42	Cape Canaveral, SLC-40	550 km (340 mi)	53.0°	60		58	Success	
28	Launch 26	v1	2021–041	15 May 2021, 22:56	Kennedy, LC-39A	569–582 km (354–362 mi)	53.0°	52		49	Success	Rideshare satellites: a radar Earth imaging satellite for Capella Space, and an Earth observation satellite, Tyvak 0130, for Tyvak Nano-Satellite Systems.
29	Launch 28	v1	2021–044	26 May 2021, 18:59	Cape Canaveral, SLC-40	550 km (340 mi)	53.0°	60		60	Success	Last v1.0 and Group 1 Starlink Launch.
–	Tr-2	v1.5	2021–059	30 June 2021, 19:31	Cape Canaveral, SLC-40	560 km (350 mi)	97.5°	3		3	Success	Part of Transporter-2 mission. Second launch of production Starlink and first launch of 3 prototype Starlink v1.5 satellites to polar orbits.
30	Group 2-1	v1.5	2021–082	14 September 2021, 03:55:50	Vandenberg, SLC-4E	570 km (350 mi)	70.0°	51		51	Success	First launch of operational Starlink satellites from Vandenberg Space Force Base, and first launch into a high-inclination, non-SSO orbit. Musk stated that the operational satellites were version 1.5 and featured "laser inter-satellite links, which are needed for high latitudes and mid-ocean coverage".
31	Group 4-1	v1.5	2021–104	13 November 2021, 11:19:30	Cape Canaveral, SLC-40	540 km (340 mi)	53.2°	53		52	Success	First launch of Group 4 Starlink satellites.
32	Group 4-3	v1.5	2021–115	2 December 2021, 23:12:15	Cape Canaveral, SLC-40	540 km (340 mi)	53.2°	48		48	Success	Rideshare satellites: BlackSky-16 Gen-2 and BlackSky-17 Gen-2.
33	Group 4-4	v1.5	2021–125	18 December 2021, 12:41:40	Vandenberg, SLC-4E	540 km (340 mi)	53.2°	52		49	Success	
34	Group 4-5	v1.5	2022–001	6 January 2022, 21:49:10	Kennedy, LC-39A	540 km (340 mi)	53.2°	49		49	Success	
35	Group 4-6	v1.5	2022–005	19 January 2022, 02:02:40	Kennedy, LC-39A	540 km (340 mi)	53.2°	49		49	Success	
36	Group 4-7	v1.5	2022–010	3 February 2022, 18:13:20	Kennedy, LC-39A	540 km (340 mi)	53.2°	49		10	Success	On 4 February 2022, the satellites deployed on this mission were significantly impacted by a G2-rated geomagnetic storm. The satellites were commanded into a safe mode, but increased atmospheric drag prevented the satellites from leaving safe mode to begin maneuvering from the low deployment altitude to an operational orbit. On 8 February 2022, SpaceX confirmed that up to 40 of the 49 deployed satellites will reenter or have reentered the Earth's atmosphere. By 12 February, 38 satellites had reentered the atmosphere while the remaining 11 continued to raise their orbits.
37	Group 4-8	v1.5	2022–016	21 February 2022, 14:44:20	Cape Canaveral, SLC-40	540 km (340 mi)	53.2°	46		46	Success	
38	Group 4-11	v1.5	2022–017	25 February 2022, 17:12:10	Vandenberg, SLC-4E	540 km (340 mi)	53.2°	50		48	Success	
39	Group 4-9	v1.5	2022–022	3 March 2022, 14:25	Kennedy, LC-39A	540 km (340 mi)	53.2°	47		47	Success	
40	Group 4-10	v1.5	2022–025	9 March 2022, 13:45:10	Cape Canaveral, SLC-40	540 km (340 mi)	53.2°	48		47	Success	Starlink 3680 (or Starlink 2022-025P) launched in this stack has maneuvered and moved to Shell 1 of starlink satellites. Possibly some other satellites in this stack will also joining the Shell 1 Starlinks in near future.
41	Group 4-12	v1.5	2022–029	19 March 2022, 04:42:30	Cape Canaveral, SLC-40	540 km (340 mi)	53.2°	53		47	Success	
42	Group 4-14	v1.5	2022–041	21 April 2022, 17:51:40	Cape Canaveral, SLC-40	540 km (340 mi)	53.2°	53		51	Success	
43	Group 4-16	v1.5	2022–045	29 April 2022, 21:27:10	Cape Canaveral, SLC-40	540 km (340 mi)	53.2°	53		52	Success	
44	Group 4-17	v1.5	2022–049	6 May 2022, 09:42	Kennedy, LC-39A	540 km (340 mi)	53.2°	53		53	Success	
45	Group 4-13	v1.5	2022–051	13 May 2022, 22:07:50	Vandenberg, SLC-4E	540 km (340 mi)	53.2°	53		53	Success	
46	Group 4-15	v1.5	2022–052	14 May 2022, 20:40:50	Cape Canaveral, SLC-40	540 km (340 mi)	53.2°	53		53	Success	
47	Group 4-18	v1.5	2022–053	18 May 2022, 10:59:40	Kennedy, LC-39A	540 km (340 mi)	53.2°	53		53	Success	
48	Group 4-19	v1.5	2022–062	17 June 2022, 16:09:20	Kennedy, LC-39A	540 km (340 mi)	53.2°	53		53	Success	
49	Group 4-21	v1.5	2022–076	7 July 2022, 13:11:10	Cape Canaveral, SLC-40	540 km (340 mi)	53.2°	53		52	Success	
50	Group 3-1	v1.5	2022–077	11 July 2022, 01:39:40	Cape Canaveral, SLC-40	560 km (350 mi)	97.6°	46		46	Success	
51	Group 4-22	v1.5	2022–083	17 July 2022, 14:20	Cape Canaveral, SLC-40	540 km (340 mi)	53.2°	53		53	Success	
52	Group 3-2	v1.5	2022–084	22 July 2022, 17:39:40	Vandenberg, SLC-4E	560 km (350 mi)	97.6°	46		46	Success	
53	Group 4-25	v1.5	2022–086	24 July 2022, 13:38:20	Kennedy, LC-39A	540 km (340 mi)	53.2°	53		51	Success	
54	Group 4-26	v1.5	2022–097	10 August 2022, 02:14:40	Kennedy, LC-39A	540 km (340 mi)	53.2°	52		51	Success	
55	Group 3-3	v1.5	2022–099	12 August 2022, 21:40:20	Vandenberg, SLC-4E	560 km (350 mi)	97.6°	46		46	Success	
56	Group 4-27	v1.5	2022–101	19 August 2022, 19:21:20	Cape Canaveral, SLC-40	540 km (340 mi)	53.2°	53		53	Success	
57	Group 4-23	v1.5	2022–104	28 August 2022, 03:41	Cape Canaveral, SLC-40	540 km (340 mi)	53.2°	54		51	Success	Heaviest Falcon 9 launch carrying an east-coast Starlink network launch for 53.2° inclination orbit located at 540 km altitude. This flight, Group 4-23, was moved from 39A to 40 to de-conflict with Artemis I operations at 39B, and booster B1069.2 from the 4-20 mission was swapped with B1067.6.
58	Group 3-4	v1.5	2022–105	31 August 2022, 05:40:10	Vandenberg, SLC-4E	560 km (350 mi)	97.6°	46		46	Success	
59	Group 4-20	v1.5	2022–107	5 September 2022, 02:09:40	Cape Canaveral, SLC-40	540 km (340 mi)	53.2°	51		46	Success	Rideshare satellites: Sherpa-LTC2 carried a sole hosted payload will be Boeing's Varuna Technology Demonstration Mission, a pathfinder for a planned constellation of broadband satellites.
60	Group 4-2	v1.5	2022–111	11 September 2022, 01:20	Kennedy, LC-39A	540 km (340 mi)	53.2°	34		31	Success	Rideshare satellites: BlueWalker-3 was released into a 513 km circular orbit.
61	Group 4-34	v1.5	2022–114	19 September 2022, 00:18:40	Cape Canaveral, SLC-40	540 km (340 mi)	53.2°	54		53	Success	
62	Group 4-35	v1.5	2022–119	24 September 2022, 23:32:10	Cape Canaveral, SLC-40	540 km (340 mi)	53.2°	52		51	Success	
63	Group 4-29	v1.5	2022–125	5 October 2022, 23:10:30	Vandenberg, SLC-4E	540 km (340 mi)	53.2°	52		52	Success	
64	Group 4-36	v1.5	2022–136	20 October 2022, 14:50:40	Cape Canaveral, SLC-40	540 km (340 mi)	53.2°	54		53	Success	
65	Group 4-31	v1.5	2022–141	28 October 2022, 01:14	Vandenberg, SLC-4E	540 km (340 mi)	53.2°	53		52	Success	
66	Group 4-37	v1.5	2022–175	17 December 2022, 21:32	Kennedy, LC-39A	540 km (340 mi)	53.2°	54		54	Success	
67	Group 5-1	v1.5	2022–177	28 December 2022, 9:34	Cape Canaveral, SLC-40	530 km (330 mi)	43.0°	54		54	Success	First launch into an initial shell of the second generation Starlink constellation.
68	Group 2-4	v1.5	2023–010	19 January 2023, 15:43	Vandenberg, SLC-4E	570 km (350 mi)	70.0°	51		50	Success	
69	Group 5-2	v1.5	2023–013	26 January 2023, 9:32	Cape Canaveral, SLC-40	530 km (330 mi)	43.0°	56		55	Success	
70	Group 2-6	v1.5	2023–014	31 January 2023, 16:15	Vandenberg, SLC-4E	570 km (350 mi)	70.0°	49		48	Success	Rideshare satellites: ION SCV-009 carries HPS' ADEO-N3, EPFL's Bunny, and StardustMe's SD-1 as hosted payloads. ION SCV-009 will deploy a satellite simulator using EBAD's 8" Payload Release Ring.
71	Group 5-3	v1.5	2023–015	2 February 2023, 7:58	Kennedy, LC-39A	530 km (330 mi)	43.0°	53		51	Success	
72	Group 5-4	v1.5	2023–020	12 February 2023, 5:10	Cape Canaveral, SLC-40	530 km (330 mi)	43.0°	55		54	Success	
73	Group 2-5	v1.5	2023–021	17 February 2023, 19:12	Vandenberg, SLC-4E	570 km (350 mi)	70.0°	51		50	Success	
74	Group 6-1	v2 mini	2023–026	27 February 2023, 23:13	Cape Canaveral, SLC-40	559 km (347 mi)	43.0°	21		12	Success	First launch of larger, upgraded Starlink V2 Mini satellites with four times the bandwidth of previous models. First use of an Argon-fueled Hall-effect thruster in space, with higher thrust and specific impulse and much lower propellant cost than SpaceX's previous Krypton-fueled thrusters. With the unknown of when Starship will be able to launch the second generation satellites, SpaceX modified the original V2 blueprint into a smaller, more compact one named “V2 Mini.” This adjustment, allowed Falcon 9 to transport these satellites, though not as many, into orbit. The first launch of the second satellites occurred on Monday, February 27, 2023, at Cape Canaveral Space Force Station in Florida on SLC-40. Falcon 9 successfully carried 21 of these satellites into orbit later that evening. SpaceX committed to reduce debris by keeping the Starlink tension rods, which hold the V2 mini satellites together, attached to the Falcon 9 second stage. These tension rods were discarded into orbit while launching earlier version of Starlink satellites. Observations confirm these V2 mini satellites host two solar panels like the Starship V2 satellites.
75	Group 2-7	v1.5	2023–028	3 March 2023, 18:38	Vandenberg, SLC-4E	570 km (350 mi)	70.0°	51		51	Success	
76	Group 2-8	v1.5	2023–037	17 March 2023, 19:26	Vandenberg, SLC-4E	570 km (350 mi)	70.0°	52		52	Success	
77	Group 5-5	v1.5	2023–042	24 March 2023, 15:43	Cape Canaveral, SLC-40	530 km (330 mi)	43.0°	56		56	Success	
78	Group 5-10	v1.5	2023–046	29 March 2023, 20:01	Cape Canaveral, SLC-40	530 km (330 mi)	43.0°	56		56	Success	
79	Group 6-2	v2 mini	2023–056	19 April 2023, 14:31	Cape Canaveral, SLC-40	559 km (347 mi)	43.0°	21		20	Success	
80	Group 3-5	v1.5	2023–058	27 April 2023, 13:40	Vandenberg, SLC-4E	560 km (350 mi)	97.6°	46		46	Success	
81	Group 5-6	v1.5	2023–061	4 May 2023, 07:31	Cape Canaveral, SLC-40	530 km (330 mi)	43.0°	56		55	Success	
82	Group 2-9	v1.5	2023–064	10 May 2023, 20:09	Vandenberg, SLC-4E	570 km (350 mi)	70.0°	51		51	Success	
83	Group 5-9	v1.5	2023–065	14 May 2023, 05:03	Cape Canaveral, SLC-40	530 km (330 mi)	43.0°	56		55	Success	
84	Group 6-3	v2 mini	2023–067	19 May 2023, 06:19	Cape Canaveral, SLC-40	559 km (347 mi)	43.0°	22		21	Success	
85	Group 2-10	v1.5	2023–078	31 May 2023, 06:02	Vandenberg, SLC-4E	570 km (350 mi)	70.0°	52		52	Success	
86	Group 6-4	v2 mini	2023–079	4 June 2023, 12:20	Cape Canaveral, SLC-40	559 km (347 mi)	43.0°	22		19	Success	
87	Group 5-11	v1.5	2023–083	12 June 2023, 07:10	Cape Canaveral, SLC-40	530 km (330 mi)	43.0°	52		52	Success	
88	Group 5-7	v1.5	2023–088	22 June 2023, 07:19	Vandenberg, SLC-4E	530 km (330 mi)	43.0°	47		47	Success	
89	Group 5-12	v1.5	2023–090	23 June 2023, 15:35	Cape Canaveral, SLC-40	530 km (330 mi)	43.0°	56		56	Success	
90	Group 5-13	v1.5	2023–094	7 July 2023, 19:29	Vandenberg, SLC-4E	530 km (330 mi)	43.0°	48		47	Success	
91	Group 6-5	v2 mini	2023–096	10 July 2023, 03:58	Cape Canaveral, SLC-40	559 km (347 mi)	43.0°	22		22	Success	
92	Group 5-15	v1.5	2023–099	16 July 2023, 03:50	Cape Canaveral, SLC-40	530 km (330 mi)	43.0°	54		54	Success	
93	Group 6-15	v2 mini	2023–102	19 July 2023, 04:09	Vandenberg, SLC-4E	559 km (347 mi)	43.0°	15		15	Success	
94	Group 6-6	v2 mini	2023–105	24 July 2023, 00:50	Cape Canaveral, SLC-40	559 km (347 mi)	43.0°	22		22	Success	
95	Group 6-7	v2 mini	2023–107	28 July 2023, 04:01	Cape Canaveral, SLC-40	559 km (347 mi)	43.0°	22		20	Success	
96	Group 6-8	v2 mini	2023–113	7 August 2023, 02:41	Cape Canaveral, SLC-40	559 km (347 mi)	43.0°	22		22	Success	
97	Group 6-20	v2 mini	2023–115	8 August 2023, 03:57	Vandenberg, SLC-4E	559 km (347 mi)	43.0°	15		15	Success	
98	Group 6-9	v2 mini	2023–119	11 August 2023, 05:17	Cape Canaveral, SLC-40	559 km (347 mi)	43.0°	22		21	Success	
99	Group 6-10	v2 mini	2023–122	17 August 2023, 03:36	Cape Canaveral, SLC-40	559 km (347 mi)	43.0°	22		22	Success	
100	Group 7-1	v2 mini	2023–124	22 August 2023, 09:37	Vandenberg, SLC-4E	525 km (326 mi)	53.05°	21		21	Success	
101	Group 6-11	v2 mini	2023–129	27 August 2023, 01:05	Cape Canaveral, SLC-40	559 km (347 mi)	43.0°	22		21	Success	
102	Group 6-13	v2 mini	2023–131	1 September 2023, 02:21	Cape Canaveral, SLC-40	559 km (347 mi)	43.0°	22		22	Success	
103	Group 6-12	v2 mini	2023–134	4 September 2023, 02:47	Kennedy, LC-39A	559 km (347 mi)	43.0°	21		21	Success	
104	Group 6-14	v2 mini	2023–138	9 September 2023, 03:12	Cape Canaveral, SLC-40	559 km (347 mi)	43.0°	22		22	Success	
105	Group 7-2	v2 mini	2023–141	12 September 2023, 06:57	Vandenberg, SLC-4E	525 km (326 mi)	53.05°	21		21	Success	
106	Group 6-16	v2 mini	2023–144	16 September 2023, 03:38	Cape Canaveral, SLC-40	559 km (347 mi)	43.0°	22		22	Success	
107	Group 6-17	v2 mini	2023–146	20 September 2023, 03:38	Cape Canaveral, SLC-40	559 km (347 mi)	43.0°	22		22	Success	
108	Group 6-18	v2 mini	2023–147	24 September 2023, 03:38	Cape Canaveral, SLC-40	559 km (347 mi)	43.0°	22		21	Success	
109	Group 7-3	v2 mini	2023–148	25 September 2023, 08:48	Vandenberg, SLC-4E	525 km (326 mi)	53.05°	21		21	Success	
110	Group 6-19	v2 mini	2023–151	30 September 2023, 02:00	Cape Canaveral, SLC-40	559 km (347 mi)	43.0°	22		22	Success	
111	Group 6-21	v2 mini	2023–153	5 October 2023, 05:36	Cape Canaveral, SLC-40	559 km (347 mi)	43.0°	22		22	Success	
112	Group 7-4	v2 mini	2023–156	9 October 2023, 07:23	Vandenberg, SLC-4E	525 km (326 mi)	53.05°	21		21	Success	
113	Group 6-22	v2 mini	2023–158	13 October 2023, 23:01	Cape Canaveral, SLC-40	559 km (347 mi)	43.0°	22		22	Success	
114	Group 6-23	v2 mini	2023–160	18 October 2023, 00:39	Cape Canaveral, SLC-40	559 km (347 mi)	43.0°	22		22	Success	
115	Group 7-5	v2 mini	2023–161	21 October 2023, 08:23	Vandenberg, SLC-4E	525 km (326 mi)	53.05°	21		21	Success	
116	Group 6-24	v2 mini	2023–162	22 October 2023, 02:17	Cape Canaveral, SLC-40	559 km (347 mi)	43.0°	23		23	Success	
117	Group 7-6	v2 mini	2023–166	29 October 2023, 09:00	Vandenberg, SLC-4E	525 km (326 mi)	53.05°	22		22	Success	
118	Group 6-25	v2 mini	2023–167	30 October 2023, 23:20	Cape Canaveral, SLC-40	559 km (347 mi)	43.0°	23		23	Success	
119	Group 6-26	v2 mini	2023–170	4 November 2023, 00:37	Cape Canaveral, SLC-40	559 km (347 mi)	43.0°	23		23	Success	
120	Group 6-27	v2 mini	2023–171	8 November 2023, 05:05	Cape Canaveral, SLC-40	559 km (347 mi)	43.0°	23		23	Success	
121	Group 6-28	v2 mini	2023–177	18 November 2023, 05:05	Cape Canaveral, SLC-40	559 km (347 mi)	43.0°	23		23	Success	
122	Group 7-7	v2 mini	2023–178	20 November 2023, 10:30	Vandenberg, SLC-4E	525 km (326 mi)	53.05°	22		22	Success	
123	Group 6-29	v2 mini	2023–180	22 November 2023, 07:47	Cape Canaveral, SLC-40	559 km (347 mi)	43.0°	23		23	Success	
124	Group 6-30	v2 mini	2023–183	28 November 2023, 04:20	Cape Canaveral, SLC-40	559 km (347 mi)	43.0°	23		23	Success	
125	Group 6-31	v2 mini	2023–186	3 December 2023, 04:00	Cape Canaveral, SLC-40	559 km (347 mi)	43.0°	23		23	Success	
126	Group 6-33	v2 mini	2023–191	7 December 2023, 05:07	Cape Canaveral, SLC-40	559 km (347 mi)	43.0°	23		23	Success	
127	Group 7-8	v2 mini	2023–192	8 December 2023, 08:03	Vandenberg, SLC-4E	525 km (326 mi)	53.05°	22		22	Success	
128	Group 6-34	v2 mini	2023–200	19 December 2023, 04:00	Cape Canaveral, SLC-40	559 km (347 mi)	43.0°	23		23	Success	
129	Group 6-32	v2 mini	2023–203	23 December 2023, 04:00	Cape Canaveral, SLC-40	559 km (347 mi)	43.0°	23		22	Success	
130	Group 6-36	v2 mini	2023–211	29 December 2023, 04:00	Cape Canaveral, SLC-40	559 km (347 mi)	43.0°	23		22	Success	
131	Group 7-9	v2 mini	2024–002	3 January 2024, 03:44	Vandenberg, SLC-4E	525 km (326 mi)	53.05°	21	6	21	Success	First with Direct to Cell capability, allowing satellites to act as a cellphone tower in space, allowing network integration similar to a standard roaming partner
132	Group 6-35	v2 mini	2024–005	7 January 2024, 22:35	Cape Canaveral, SLC-40	559 km (347 mi)	43.0°	23		23	Success	
133	Group 7-10	v2 mini	2024–011	14 January 2024, 08:59	Vandenberg, SLC-4E	525 km (326 mi)	53.05°	22		22	Success	
134	Group 6-37	v2 mini	2024–012	15 January 2024, 01:52	Cape Canaveral, SLC-40	559 km (347 mi)	43.0°	23		23	Success	
135	Group 7-11	v2 mini	2024–017	24 January 2024, 00:35	Vandenberg, SLC-4E	525 km (326 mi)	53.05°	22		22	Success	
136	Group 6-38	v2 mini	2024–019	29 January 2024, 01:10	Cape Canaveral, SLC-40	559 km (347 mi)	43.0°	23		23	Success	
137	Group 7-12	v2 mini	2024–020	29 January 2024, 05:02	Vandenberg, SLC-4E	525 km (326 mi)	53.05°	22		22	Success	
138	Group 7-13	v2 mini	2024–027	10 February 2024, 00:34	Vandenberg, SLC-4E	525 km (326 mi)	53.05°	22		21	Success	
139	Group 7-14	v2 mini	2024–031	15 February 2024, 21:34	Vandenberg, SLC-4E	525 km (326 mi)	53.05°	22		22	Success	
140	Group 7-15	v2 mini	2024–036	23 February 2024, 04:11	Vandenberg, SLC-4E	525 km (326 mi)	53.05°	22		22	Success	
141	Group 6-39	v2 mini	2024–038	25 February 2024, 22:06	Cape Canaveral, SLC-40	559 km (347 mi)	43.0°	24		24	Success	
142	Group 6-40	v2 mini	2024–041	29 February 2024, 15:30	Cape Canaveral, SLC-40	559 km (347 mi)	43.0°	23		22	Success	
143	Group 6-41	v2 mini	2024–044	4 March 2024, 23:54	Cape Canaveral, SLC-40	559 km (347 mi)	43.0°	23		23	Success	
144	Group 6-43	v2 mini	2024–045	11 March 2024, 00:03	Cape Canaveral, SLC-40	559 km (347 mi)	43.0°	23		23	Success	
145	Group 7-17	v2 mini	2024–046	11 March 2024, 04:09	Vandenberg, SLC-4E	525 km (326 mi)	53.05°	23		23	Success	
146	Group 6-44	v2 mini	2024–049	16 March 2024, 00:21	Kennedy, LC-39A	559 km (347 mi)	43.0°	23		23	Success	
147	Group 7-16	v2 mini	2024–050	19 March 2024, 02:28	Vandenberg, SLC-4E	525 km (326 mi)	53.05°	20		20	Success	Rideshare satellites: Two Starshield satellites.
148	Group 6-42	v2 mini	2024–056	24 March 2024, 03:09	Cape Canaveral, SLC-40	559 km (347 mi)	43.0°	23		23	Success	
149	Group 6-46	v2 mini	2024–057	25 March 2024, 23:42	Cape Canaveral, SLC-40	559 km (347 mi)	43.0°	23		23	Success	
150	Group 6-45	v2 mini	2024–060	31 March 2024, 01:30	Cape Canaveral, SLC-40	559 km (347 mi)	43.0°	23		23	Success	
151	Group 7-18	v2 mini	2024–062	2 April 2024, 02:30	Vandenberg, SLC-4E	525 km (326 mi)	53.05°	22		22	Success	
152	Group 6-47	v2 mini	2024–064	5 April 2024, 09:12	Cape Canaveral, SLC-40	559 km (347 mi)	43.0°	23		23	Success	
153	Group 8-1	v2 mini	2024–065	7 April 2024, 02:25	Vandenberg, SLC-4E	535 km (332 mi)	53.00°	21	6	21	Success	
154	Group 6-48	v2 mini	2024–068	10 April 2024, 04:40	Cape Canaveral, SLC-40	559 km (347 mi)	43.0°	23		23	Success	
155	Group 6-49	v2 mini	2024–071	13 April 2024, 01:40	Kennedy, LC-39A	559 km (347 mi)	43.0°	23		23	Success	
156	Group 6-51	v2 mini	2024–073	17 April 2024, 21:24	Kennedy, LC-39A	559 km (347 mi)	43.0°	23		23	Success	
157	Group 6-52	v2 mini	2024–074	18 April 2024, 22:40	Cape Canaveral, SLC-40	559 km (347 mi)	43.0°	23		23	Success	
158	Group 6-53	v2 mini	2024–076	23 April 2024, 22:17	Cape Canaveral, SLC-40	559 km (347 mi)	43.0°	23		23	Success	
159	Group 6-54	v2 mini	2024–080	28 April 2024, 21:50	Cape Canaveral, SLC-40	559 km (347 mi)	43.0°	23		23	Success	
160	Group 6-55	v2 mini	2024–082	3 May 2024, 01:49	Cape Canaveral, SLC-40	559 km (347 mi)	43.0°	23		23	Success	
161	Group 6-57	v2 mini	2024–084	6 May 2024, 18:14	Cape Canaveral, SLC-40	559 km (347 mi)	43.0°	23		23	Success	
162	Group 6-56	v2 mini	2024–086	8 May 2024, 18:42	Kennedy, LC-39A	559 km (347 mi)	43.0°	23		23	Success	
163	Group 8-2	v2 mini	2024–088	10 May 2024, 04:30	Vandenberg, SLC-4E	535 km (332 mi)	53.00°	20	13	20	Success	
164	Group 6-58	v2 mini	2024–090	13 May 2024, 00:53	Cape Canaveral, SLC-40	559 km (347 mi)	43.0°	23		23	Success	
165	Group 8-7	v2 mini	2024–091	14 May 2024, 18:39	Vandenberg, SLC-4E	535 km (332 mi)	53.00°	20	13	20	Success	
166	Group 6-59	v2 mini	2024–093	18 May 2024, 00:32	Cape Canaveral, SLC-40	559 km (347 mi)	43.0°	23		23	Success	
167	Group 6-62	v2 mini	2024–097	23 May 2024, 02:33	Cape Canaveral, SLC-40	559 km (347 mi)	43.0°	23		23	Success	
168	Group 6-63	v2 mini	2024–098	24 May 2024, 02:45	Kennedy, LC-39A	559 km (347 mi)	43.0°	23		23	Success	
169	Group 6-60	v2 mini	2024–100	28 May 2024, 14:24	Cape Canaveral, SLC-40	559 km (347 mi)	43.0°	23		23	Success	
170	Group 6-64	v2 mini	2024–106	1 June 2024, 02:37	Cape Canaveral, SLC-40	559 km (347 mi)	43.0°	23		23	Success	
171	Group 8-5	v2 mini	2024–107	5 June 2024, 02:16	Cape Canaveral, SLC-40	535 km (332 mi)	53.00°	20	13	20	Success	
172	Group 10-1	v2 mini	2024–111	8 June 2024, 01:56	Cape Canaveral, SLC-40	279 km (173 mi)	53.16°	22		22	Success	
173	Group 8-8	v2 mini	2024–112	8 June 2024, 12:58	Vandenberg, SLC-4E	535 km (332 mi)	53.00°	20	13	20	Success	
174	Group 9-1	v2 mini	2024–113	19 June 2024, 03:40	Vandenberg, SLC-4E	535 km (332 mi)	53.00°	20	13	20	Success	
175	Group 10-2	v2 mini	2024–117	23 June 2024, 17:15	Cape Canaveral, SLC-40	279 km (173 mi)	53.16°	22		22	Success	
176	Group 9-2	v2 mini	2024–118	24 June 2024, 03:47	Vandenberg, SLC-4E	535 km (332 mi)	53.00°	20	13	20	Success	
177	Group 10-3	v2 mini	2024–120	27 June 2024, 11:14	Cape Canaveral, SLC-40	279 km (173 mi)	53.16°	23		23	Success	
178	Group 8-9	v2 mini	2024–124	3 July 2024, 08:55	Cape Canaveral, SLC-40	535 km (332 mi)	53.00°	20	13	20	Success	
179	Group 9-3	v2 mini	2024–129	12 July 2024, 02:39	Vandenberg, SLC-4E	535 km (332 mi)	53.00°	20	13	0	Failure	Experienced launch failure. During launch a liquid oxygen leak developed, causing the upper stage to fail during the second burn. The satellites were left in a very low, unusable orbit.
180	Group 10-9	v2 mini	2024–131	27 July 2024, 05:45	Kennedy, LC-39A	279 km (173 mi)	53.16°	23		23	Success	
181	Group 10-4	v2 mini	2024–132	28 July 2024, 04:17	Cape Canaveral, SLC-40	279 km (173 mi)	53.16°	23		23	Success	
182	Group 9-4	v2 mini	2024–133	28 July 2024, 07:24	Vandenberg, SLC-4E	535 km (332 mi)	53.00°	21	13	21	Success	
183	Group 10-6	v2 mini	2024–136	2 August 2024, 05:01	Kennedy, LC-39A	279 km (173 mi)	53.16°	23		23	Success	
184	Group 11-1	v2 mini	2024–138	4 August 2024, 07:24	Vandenberg, SLC-4E	535 km (332 mi)	53.00°	23		23	Success	
185	Group 8-3	v2 mini	2024–141	10 August 2024, 12:50	Cape Canaveral, SLC-40	535 km (332 mi)	53.00°	21	13	21	Success	
186	Group 10-7	v2 mini	2024–144	12 August 2024, 10:37	Kennedy, LC-39A	279 km (173 mi)	53.16°	23		23	Success	
187	Group 10-5	v2 mini	2024–150	20 August 2024, 13:20	Cape Canaveral, SLC-40	279 km (173 mi)	53.16°	22		22	Success	
188	Group 8-6	v2 mini	2024–152	28 August 2024, 06:54	Cape Canaveral, SLC-40	535 km (332 mi)	53.00°	21	13	21	Success	
189	Group 8-10	v2 mini	2024–154	31 August 2024, 07:43	Cape Canaveral, SLC-40	535 km (332 mi)	53.00°	21	13	21	Success	
190	Group 9-5	v2 mini	2024–155	31 August 2024, 08:48	Vandenberg, SLC-4E	535 km (332 mi)	53.00°	21	13	21	Success	
191	Group 8-11	v2 mini	2024–158	5 September 2024, 15:33	Cape Canaveral, SLC-40	535 km (332 mi)	53.00°	21	13	21	Success	
192	Group 9-6	v2 mini	2024–164	13 September 2024, 01:45	Vandenberg, SLC-4E	535 km (332 mi)	53.00°	21	13	21	Success	
193	Group 9-17	v2 mini	2024–171	20 September 2024, 13:50	Vandenberg, SLC-4E	535 km (332 mi)	53.00°	20	13	20	Success	
194	Group 9-8	v2 mini	2024–175	25 September 2024, 04:01	Vandenberg, SLC-4E	535 km (332 mi)	53.00°	20	13	20	Success	
195	Group 10-10	v2 mini	2024–183	15 October 2024, 06:10	Cape Canaveral, SLC-40	279 km (173 mi)	53.16°	23		23	Success	
196	Group 9-7	v2 mini	2024–184	15 October 2024, 08:21	Vandenberg, SLC-4E	535 km (332 mi)	53.00°	20	13	20	Success	
197	Group 8-19	v2 mini	2024–187	18 October 2024, 23:31	Cape Canaveral, SLC-40	535 km (332 mi)	53.00°	20	13	20	Success	
198	Group 6-61	v2 mini	2024–191	23 October 2024, 21:47	Cape Canaveral, SLC-40	559 km (347 mi)	43.0°	23		23	Success	
199	Group 10-8	v2 mini	2024–193	26 October 2024, 21:47	Cape Canaveral, SLC-40	279 km (173 mi)	53.16°	22		22	Success	
200	Group 9-9	v2 mini	2024–195	30 October 2024, 12:07	Vandenberg, SLC-4E	535 km (332 mi)	53.00°	20	13	20	Success	200th launch of dedicated starlink missions.
201	Group 10-13	v2 mini	2024–196	30 October 2024, 21:10	Cape Canaveral, SLC-40	279 km (173 mi)	53.16°	23		23	Success	
202	Group 6-77	v2 mini	2024–202	7 November 2024, 20:19	Cape Canaveral, SLC-40	559 km (347 mi)	43.0°	23		23	Success	
203	Group 9-10	v2 mini	2024–204	9 November 2024, 06:14	Vandenberg, SLC-4E	535 km (332 mi)	53.00°	20	13	20	Success	
204	Group 6-69	v2 mini	2024–207	11 November 2024, 21:28	Cape Canaveral, SLC-40	559 km (347 mi)	43.0°	24		24	Success	
205	Group 9-11	v2 mini	2024–209	14 November 2024, 05:23	Vandenberg, SLC-4E	535 km (332 mi)	53.00°	20	13	20	Success	
206	Group 6-68	v2 mini	2024–210	14 November 2024, 13:21	Cape Canaveral, SLC-40	559 km (347 mi)	43.0°	24		24	Success	
207	Group 9-12	v2 mini	2024–213	18 November 2024, 05:53	Vandenberg, SLC-4E	535 km (332 mi)	53.00°	20	13	20	Success	
208	Group 6-66	v2 mini	2024–216	21 November 2024, 16:07	Cape Canaveral, SLC-40	559 km (347 mi)	43.0°	24		24	Success	
209	Group 9-13	v2 mini	2024–217	24 November 2024, 05:25	Vandenberg, SLC-4E	535 km (332 mi)	53.00°	20	13	20	Success	
210	Group 12-1	v2 mini	2024–220	25 November 2024, 10:02	Cape Canaveral, SLC-40	559 km (347 mi)	43.0°	23	12	23	Success	
211	Group 6-76	v2 mini	2024–222	27 November 2024, 04:41	Kennedy, LC-39A	559 km (347 mi)	43.0°	24		24	Success	
212	Group 6-65	v2 mini	2024–224	30 November 2024, 05:00	Cape Canaveral, SLC-40	559 km (347 mi)	43.0°	24		24	Success	
213	Group N-01	v2 mini	2024–225	30 November 2024, 08:10	Vandenberg, SLC-4E	570 km (350 mi)	70.0°	20		20	Success	The 20 Starlink satellites were launched together with two Starshields from NROL-126 mission
214	Group 6-70	v2 mini	2024–229	4 December 2024, 10:13	Cape Canaveral, SLC-40	559 km (347 mi)	43.0°	24		24	Success	
215	Group 9-14	v2 mini	2024–231	5 December 2024, 03:05	Vandenberg, SLC-4E	535 km (332 mi)	53.00°	20	13	20	Success	
216	Group 12-5	v2 mini	2024–237	8 December 2024, 05:12	Cape Canaveral, SLC-40	559 km (347 mi)	43.0°	23	13	23	Success	
217	Group 11-2	v2 mini	2024–239	13 December 2024, 21:55	Vandenberg, SLC-4E	535 km (332 mi)	53.00°	22	13	22	Success	
218	Group 12-2	v2 mini	2024–249	23 December 2024, 05:35	Kennedy, LC-39A	559 km (347 mi)	43.0°	21	13	21	Success	
219	Group 11-3	v2 mini	2024–251	29 December 2024, 01:58	Vandenberg, SLC-4E	535 km (332 mi)	53.00°	22		22	Success	
220	Group 12-6	v2 mini	2024–254	31 December 2024, 05:39	Kennedy, LC-39A	559 km (347 mi)	43.0°	21	13	21	Success	
221	Group 6-71	v2 mini	2025–003	6 January 2025, 20:43	Cape Canaveral, SLC-40	559 km (347 mi)	43.0°	24		24	Success	
222	Group 12-11	v2 mini	2025–004	8 January 2025, 15:27	Kennedy, LC-39A	559 km (347 mi)	43.0°	21	13	21	Success	
223	Group 12-12	v2 mini	2025–006	10 January 2025, 19:11	Cape Canaveral, SLC-40	559 km (347 mi)	43.0°	21	13	21	Success	
224	Group 12-4	v2 mini	2025–008	13 January 2025, 16:47	Cape Canaveral, SLC-40	559 km (347 mi)	43.0°	21	13	21	Success	
225	Group 13-1	v2 mini	2025–014	21 January 2025, 05:24	Kennedy, LC-39A	559 km (347 mi)	43.0°	21		21	Success	Rideshare satellites: Two Starshield satellites.
226	Group 11-8	v2 mini	2025–015	21 January 2025, 15:45	Vandenberg, SLC-4E	535 km (332 mi)	53.00°	27		27	Success	
227	Group 11-6	v2 mini	2025–018	24 January 2025, 14:07	Vandenberg, SLC-4E	535 km (332 mi)	53.00°	23		23	Success	
228	Group 12-7	v2 mini	2025–019	27 January 2025, 22:05	Cape Canaveral, SLC-40	559 km (347 mi)	43.0°	21	13	21	Success	
229	Group 11-4	v2 mini	2025–022	2 February 2025, 23:02	Vandenberg, SLC-4E	535 km (332 mi)	53.00°	22		22	Success	
230	Group 12-3	v2 mini	2025–024	4 February 2025, 10:15	Cape Canaveral, SLC-40	559 km (347 mi)	43.0°	21	13	21	Success	
231	Group 12-9	v2 mini	2025–027	8 February 2025, 19:18	Cape Canaveral, SLC-40	559 km (347 mi)	43.0°	21	13	21	Success	
232	Group 11-10	v2 mini	2025–029	11 February 2025, 02:09	Vandenberg, SLC-4E	535 km (332 mi)	53.00°	23		23	Success	
233	Group 12-18	v2 mini	2025–031	11 February 2025, 18:53	Cape Canaveral, SLC-40	559 km (347 mi)	43.0°	21	13	21	Success	
234	Group 12-8	v2 mini	2025–032	15 February 2025, 06:14	Cape Canaveral, SLC-40	559 km (347 mi)	43.0°	21	13	21	Success	
235	Group 10-12	v2 mini	2025–034	18 February 2025, 23:21	Cape Canaveral, SLC-40	279 km (173 mi)	53.16°	23		23	Success	
236	Group 12-14	v2 mini	2025–035	21 February 2025, 15:19	Cape Canaveral, SLC-40	559 km (347 mi)	43.0°	23	13	23	Success	
237	Group 15-1	v2 mini	2025–037	23 February 2025, 01:38	Vandenberg, SLC-4E	535 km (332 mi)	70.0°	22		22	Success	
238	Group 12-13	v2 mini	2025–039	27 February 2025, 03:34	Cape Canaveral, SLC-40	559 km (347 mi)	43.0°	21	13	21	Success	
239	Group 12-20	v2 mini	2025–043	3 March 2025, 02:24	Cape Canaveral, SLC-40	559 km (347 mi)	43.0°	21	13	21	Success	
240	Group 12-21	v2 mini	2025–048	13 March 2025, 02:35	Cape Canaveral, SLC-40	559 km (347 mi)	43.0°	21	13	21	Success	
241	Group 12-16	v2 mini	2025–053	15 March 2025, 11:35	Cape Canaveral, SLC-40	559 km (347 mi)	43.0°	23	13	23	Success	
242	Group 12-25	v2 mini	2025–057	18 March 2025, 19:57	Cape Canaveral, SLC-40	559 km (347 mi)	43.0°	23	13	23	Success	
243	Group 11-7	v2 mini	2025–063	26 March 2025, 22:11	Vandenberg, SLC-4E	535 km (332 mi)	53.00°	27		27	Success	
244	Group 6-80	v2 mini	2025–065	31 March 2025, 19:52	Cape Canaveral, SLC-40	559 km (347 mi)	43.0°	28		28	Success	
245	Group 11-13	v2 mini	2025–069	4 April 2025, 01:02	Vandenberg, SLC-4E	535 km (332 mi)	53.00°	27		27	Success	
246	Group 6-72	v2 mini	2025–070	6 April 2025, 03:07	Cape Canaveral, SLC-40	559 km (347 mi)	43.0°	28		28	Success	
247	Group 11-11	v2 mini	2025–071	7 April 2025, 23:06	Vandenberg, SLC-4E	535 km (332 mi)	53.00°	27		27	Success	
248	Group 12-17	v2 mini	2025–075	13 April 2025, 00:53	Kennedy, LC-39A	559 km (347 mi)	43.0°	21	13	21	Success	
249	Group 6-73	v2 mini	2025–076	14 April 2025, 04:00	Cape Canaveral, SLC-40	559 km (347 mi)	43.0°	27		27	Success	
250	Group 6-74	v2 mini	2025–083	25 April 2025, 01:52	Cape Canaveral, SLC-40	559 km (347 mi)	43.0°	28		28	Success	
251	Group 12-23	v2 mini	2025–085	28 April 2025, 02:09	Cape Canaveral, SLC-40	559 km (347 mi)	43.0°	23	13	23	Success	
252	Group 11-9	v2 mini	2025–087	28 April 2025, 20:42	Vandenberg, SLC-4E	535 km (332 mi)	53.00°	27		27	Success	
253	Group 12-10	v2 mini	2025–089	29 April 2025, 02:34	Kennedy, LC-39A	559 km (347 mi)	43.0°	23	13	23	Success	
254	Group 6-75	v2 mini	2025–091	2 May 2025, 01:51	Cape Canaveral, SLC-40	559 km (347 mi)	43.0°	28		28	Success	
255	Group 6-84	v2 mini	2025–092	4 May 2025, 08:54	Kennedy, LC-39A	559 km (347 mi)	43.0°	29		29	Success	
256	Group 6-93	v2 mini	2025–093	7 May 2025, 01:17	Cape Canaveral, SLC-40	559 km (347 mi)	43.0°	28		28	Success	
257	Group 15-3	v2 mini	2025–094	10 May 2025, 00:19	Vandenberg, SLC-4E	535 km (332 mi)	70.0°	26		26	Success	
258	Group 6-91	v2 mini	2025–095	10 May 2025, 06:28	Cape Canaveral, SLC-40	559 km (347 mi)	43.0°	28		28	Success	
259	Group 15-4	v2 mini	2025–098	13 May 2025, 01:15	Vandenberg, SLC-4E	535 km (332 mi)	70.0°	26		26	Success	
260	Group 6-83	v2 mini	2025–099	13 May 2025, 05:02	Kennedy, LC-39A	559 km (347 mi)	43.0°	28		28	Success	
261	Group 6-67	v2 mini	2025–101	14 May 2025, 16:38	Cape Canaveral, SLC-40	559 km (347 mi)	43.0°	28		28	Success	
262	Group 15-5	v2 mini	2025–102	16 May 2025, 13:43	Vandenberg, SLC-4E	535 km (332 mi)	70.0°	26		26	Success	
263	Group 12-15	v2 mini	2025–107	21 May 2025, 03:19	Cape Canaveral, SLC-40	559 km (347 mi)	43.0°	23	13	23	Success	
264	Group 11-16	v2 mini	2025–110	23 May 2025, 22:32	Vandenberg, SLC-4E	535 km (332 mi)	53.00°	27		27	Success	
265	Group 12-22	v2 mini	2025–111	24 May 2025, 17:19	Cape Canaveral, SLC-40	559 km (347 mi)	43.0°	23	13	23	Success	
266	Group 17–1	v2 mini	2025–112	27 May 2025, 16:57	Vandenberg, SLC-4E	535 km (332 mi)	97.61°	24		24	Success	first v2 batch into polar / SSO orbit
267	Group 10-32	v2 mini	2025–113	28 May 2025, 13:30	Kennedy, LC-39A	279 km (173 mi)	53.16°	27		27	Success	
268	Group 11-18	v2 mini	2025–117	31 May 2025, 20:10	Vandenberg, SLC-4E	535 km (332 mi)	53.00°	27		27	Success	
269	Group 12-19	v2 mini	2025–119	3 June 2025, 04:43	Cape Canaveral, SLC-40	559 km (347 mi)	43.0°	23	13	23	Success	
270	Group 11-22	v2 mini	2025–120	4 June 2025, 23:40	Vandenberg, SLC-4E	535 km (332 mi)	53.00°	27		27	Success	
271	Group 15-8	v2 mini	2025–123	8 June 2025, 14:20	Vandenberg, SLC-4E	535 km (332 mi)	70.0°	26		26	Success	
272	Group 12-24	v2 mini	2025–124	10 June 2025, 13:05	Cape Canaveral, SLC-40	559 km (347 mi)	43.0°	23	13	23	Success	
273	Group 15-6	v2 mini	2025–126	13 June 2025, 01:54	Vandenberg, SLC-4E	535 km (332 mi)	70.0°	26		26	Success	
274	Group 12-26	v2 mini	2025–127	13 June 2025, 15:29	Cape Canaveral, SLC-40	559 km (347 mi)	43.0°	23	13	23	Success	
275	Group 15-9	v2 mini	2025–129	17 June 2025, 01:36	Vandenberg, SLC-4E	535 km (332 mi)	70.0°	26		26	Success	
276	Group 10-18	v2 mini	2025–130	18 June 2025, 05:55	Cape Canaveral, SLC-40	279 km (173 mi)	53.16°	28		28	Success	
277	Group 10-23	v2 mini	2025–133	23 June 2025, 05:58	Cape Canaveral, SLC-40	279 km (173 mi)	53.16°	27		27	Success	
278	Group 10-16	v2 mini	2025–137	25 June 2025, 19:54	Cape Canaveral, SLC-40	279 km (173 mi)	53.16°	27		27	Success	
279	Group 10-34	v2 mini	2025–139	28 June 2025, 04:26	Cape Canaveral, SLC-40	279 km (173 mi)	53.16°	27		27	Success	
280	Group 15-7	v2 mini	2025–142	28 June 2025, 17:13	Vandenberg, SLC-4E	535 km (332 mi)	70.0°	26		26	Success	
281	Group 10-25	v2 mini	2025–144	2 July 2025, 06:28	Cape Canaveral, SLC-40	279 km (173 mi)	53.16°	27		27	Success	
282	Group 10-28	v2 mini	2025–147	8 July 2025, 08:21	Cape Canaveral, SLC-40	279 km (173 mi)	53.16°	28		28	Success	
283	Group 15-2	v2 mini	2025–150	16 July 2025, 02:05	Vandenberg, SLC-4E	535 km (332 mi)	70.0°	26		26	Success	
284	Group 17-3	v2 mini	2025–152	19 July 2025, 03:52	Vandenberg, SLC-4E	535 km (332 mi)	97.61°	24		24	Success	
285	Group 10-26	v2 mini	2025–157	26 July 2025, 09:01	Cape Canaveral, SLC-40	279 km (173 mi)	53.16°	28		28	Success	
286	Group 17-2	v2 mini	2025–158	27 July 2025, 04:31	Vandenberg, SLC-4E	535 km (332 mi)	97.61°	24		24	Success	
287	Group 10-29	v2 mini	2025–161	30 July 2025, 03:37	Cape Canaveral, SLC-40	279 km (173 mi)	53.16°	28		28	Success	
288	Group 13-4	v2 mini	2025–165	31 July 2025, 18:35	Vandenberg, SLC-4E	559 km (347 mi)	97.6°	19		19	Success	Rideshare satellites: Two Starshield satellites.
289	Group 10-30	v2 mini	2025–167	4 August 2025, 07:57	Cape Canaveral, SLC-40	279 km (173 mi)	53.16°	28		28	Success	
290	Group 17-4	v2 mini	2025–175	14 August 2025, 05:05	Vandenberg, SLC-4E	535 km (332 mi)	97.61°	24		24	Success	
291	Group 10-20	v2 mini	2025–176	14 August 2025, 12:29	Cape Canaveral, SLC-40	279 km (173 mi)	53.16°	28		28	Success	Starlink tested a “mini laser” to allow connectivity for third party satellites and space stations with the Starlink constellation.
292	Group 17-5	v2 mini	2025–179	18 August 2025, 16:26	Vandenberg, SLC-4E	535 km (332 mi)	97.61°	24		24	Success	
293	Group 17-6	v2 mini	2025–184	22 August 2025, 17:04	Vandenberg, SLC-4E	535 km (332 mi)	97.61°	24		24	Success	
294	Group 10-56	v2 mini	2025–189	27 August 2025, 11:10	Cape Canaveral, SLC-40	279 km (173 mi)	53.16°	28		28	Success	
295	Group 10-11	v2 mini	2025–190	28 August 2025, 08:12	Kennedy, LC-39A	279 km (173 mi)	53.16°	28		28	Success	
296	Group 17-7	v2 mini	2025–191	30 August 2025, 04:59	Vandenberg, SLC-4E	535 km (332 mi)	97.61°	24		24	Success	
297	Group 10-14	v2 mini	2025–192	31 August 2025, 11:49	Cape Canaveral, SLC-40	279 km (173 mi)	53.16°	28		28	Success	
298	Group 17-8	v2 mini	2025–194	3 September 2025, 03:51	Vandenberg, SLC-4E	535 km (332 mi)	97.61°	24		24	Success	
299	Group 10-22	v2 mini	2025–195	3 September 2025, 11:56	Cape Canaveral, SLC-40	279 km (173 mi)	53.16°	28		28	Success	
300	Group 10-57	v2 mini	2025–198	5 September 2025, 12:32	Kennedy, LC-39A	279 km (173 mi)	53.16°	28		28	Success	
301	Group 17-9	v2 mini	2025–200	6 September 2025, 18:06	Vandenberg, SLC-4E	535 km (332 mi)	97.61°	24		24	Success	2,000th Starlink satellites to be launched into space in 2025. 300th dedicated Starlink launch.
302	Group 17-10	v2 mini	2025–207	13 September 2025, 17:55	Vandenberg, SLC-4E	535 km (332 mi)	97.61°	24		24	Success	
303	Group 10-61	v2 mini	2025–210	18 September 2025, 09:30	Cape Canaveral, SLC-40	279 km (173 mi)	53.16°	28		28	Success	
304	Group 17-12	v2 mini	2025–211	19 September 2025, 16:31	Vandenberg, SLC-4E	535 km (332 mi)	97.61°	24		24	Success	
305	Group 10-27	v2 mini	2025–212	21 September 2025, 10:53	Cape Canaveral, SLC-40	279 km (173 mi)	53.16°	28		28	Success	
306	Group 10-15	v2 mini	2025–216	25 September 2025, 08:39	Cape Canaveral, SLC-40	279 km (173 mi)	53.16°	28		28	Success	
307	Group 17-11	v2 mini	2025–218	26 September 2025, 04:26	Vandenberg, SLC-4E	535 km (332 mi)	97.61°	24		24	Success	
308	Group 11-20	v2 mini	2025–221	29 September 2025, 02:04	Vandenberg, SLC-4E	535 km (332 mi)	53.00°	28		28	Success	
309	Group 11-39	v2 mini	2025–223	3 October 2025, 14:06	Vandenberg, SLC-4E	535 km (332 mi)	53.00°	28		28	Success	
310	Group 10-59	v2 mini	2025–224	7 October 2025, 06:46	Cape Canaveral, SLC-40	279 km (173 mi)	53.16°	28		28	Success	
311	Group 11-17	v2 mini	2025–225	8 October 2025, 03:54	Vandenberg, SLC-4E	535 km (332 mi)	53.00°	28		28	Success	
312	Group 10-52	v2 mini	2025–232	16 October 2025, 09:27	Cape Canaveral, SLC-40	279 km (173 mi)	53.16°	28		28	Success	
313	Group 10-17	v2 mini	2025–235	19 October 2025, 17:39	Cape Canaveral, SLC-40	279 km (173 mi)	53.16°	28		28	Success	
314	Group 11-19	v2 mini	2025–236	19 October 2025, 19:24	Vandenberg, SLC-4E	535 km (332 mi)	53.00°	28		28	Success	Launched 10,000th Starlink satellite.
315	Group 11-5	v2 mini	2025–237	22 October 2025, 14:16	Vandenberg, SLC-4E	535 km (332 mi)	53.00°	28		28	Success	
316	Group 11-12	v2 mini	2025–240	25 October 2025, 14:20	Vandenberg, SLC-4E	535 km (332 mi)	53.00°	28		28	Success	
317	Group 10-21	v2 mini	2025–243	26 October 2025, 15:00	Cape Canaveral, SLC-40	279 km (173 mi)	53.16°	28		28	Success	
318	Group 11-21	v2 mini	2025–244	28 October 2025, 00:43	Vandenberg, SLC-4E	535 km (332 mi)	53.00°	28		28	Success	
319	Group 10-37	v2 mini	2025–245	29 October 2025, 16:35	Cape Canaveral, SLC-40	279 km (173 mi)	53.16°	29		29	Success	
320	Group 11-23	v2 mini	2025–247	31 October 2025, 20:41	Vandenberg, SLC-4E	535 km (332 mi)	53.00°	28		28	Success	
321	Group 6-81	v2 mini	2025–253	6 November 2025, 01:31	Cape Canaveral, SLC-40	559 km (347 mi)	43.0°	29		29	Success	
322	Group 11-14	v2 mini	2025–254	6 November 2025, 21:13	Vandenberg, SLC-4E	535 km (332 mi)	53.00°	28		28	Success	
323	Group 10-51	v2 mini	2025–257	9 November 2025, 08:10	Kennedy, LC-39A	279 km (173 mi)	53.16°	29		29	Success	
324	Group 6-87	v2 mini	2025–259	11 November 2025, 03:21	Cape Canaveral, SLC-40	559 km (347 mi)	43.0°	29		29	Success	
325	Group 6-89	v2 mini	2025–262	15 November 2025, 03:08	Kennedy, LC-39A	559 km (347 mi)	43.0°	29		29	Success	
326	Group 6-85	v2 mini	2025–263	15 November 2025, 06:44	Cape Canaveral, SLC-40	559 km (347 mi)	43.0°	29		29	Success	
327	Group 6-94	v2 mini	2025–265	19 November 2025, 00:12	Cape Canaveral, SLC-40	559 km (347 mi)	43.0°	29		29	Success	
328	Group 6-78	v2 mini	2025–268	21 November 2025, 03:39	Kennedy, LC-39A	559 km (347 mi)	43.0°	29		29	Success	
329	Group 6-79	v2 mini	2025–270	22 November 2025, 07:53	Cape Canaveral, SLC-40	559 km (347 mi)	43.0°	29		29	Success	
330	Group 11-30	v2 mini	2025–271	23 November 2025, 08:48	Vandenberg, SLC-4E	535 km (332 mi)	53.00°	28		28	Success	
331	Group 6-86	v2 mini	2025–278	1 December 2025, 07:44	Kennedy, LC-39A	559 km (347 mi)	43.0°	29		29	Success	
332	Group 15-10	v2 mini	2025–280	2 December 2025, 05:28	Vandenberg, SLC-4E	535 km (332 mi)	70.0°	27		27	Success	
333	Group 6-95	v2 mini	2025–281	2 December 2025, 22:18	Cape Canaveral, SLC-40	559 km (347 mi)	43.0°	29		29	Success	
334	Group 11-25	v2 mini	2025–283	4 December 2025, 20:42	Vandenberg, SLC-4E	535 km (332 mi)	53.00°	28		28	Success	
335	Group 11-15	v2 mini	2025–286	7 December 2025, 17:58	Vandenberg, SLC-4E	535 km (332 mi)	53.00°	28		28	Success	
336	Group 6-92	v2 mini	2025–288	8 December 2025, 22:26	Kennedy, LC-39A	559 km (347 mi)	43.0°	29		29	Success	
337	Group 15-11	v2 mini	2025–293	10 December 2025, 11:40	Vandenberg, SLC-4E	535 km (332 mi)	70.0°	27		27	Success	
338	Group 6-90	v2 mini	2025–294	11 December 2025, 22:01	Cape Canaveral, SLC-40	559 km (347 mi)	43.0°	29		29	Success	
339	Group 15-12	v2 mini	2025–298	14 December 2025, 05:49	Vandenberg, SLC-4E	535 km (332 mi)	70.0°	27		27	Success	
340	Group 6-82	v2 mini	2025–299	15 December 2025, 05:25	Cape Canaveral, SLC-40	559 km (347 mi)	43.0°	29		29	Success	
341	Group 6-99	v2 mini	2025–303	17 December 2025, 13:42	Kennedy, LC-39A	559 km (347 mi)	43.0°	29		29	Success	
342	Group 15-13	v2 mini	2025–304	17 December 2025, 15:27	Vandenberg, SLC-4E	535 km (332 mi)	70.0°	27		27	Success	
343	Group 6-88	v2 mini	2026–002	4 January 2026, 06:48	Cape Canaveral, SLC-40	559 km (347 mi)	43.0°	29		29	Success	
344	Group 6-96	v2 mini	2026–003	9 January 2026, 21:41	Cape Canaveral, SLC-40	559 km (347 mi)	43.0°	29		29	Success	
345	Group 6-97	v2 mini	2026–005	12 January 2026, 21:08	Cape Canaveral, SLC-40	559 km (347 mi)	43.0°	29		29	Success	
346	Group 6-98	v2 mini	2026–008	14 January 2026, 18:08	Cape Canaveral, SLC-40	559 km (347 mi)	43.0°	29		29	Success	
347	Group 6-100	v2 mini	2026–012	18 January 2026, 23:31	Cape Canaveral, SLC-40	559 km (347 mi)	43.0°	29		29	Success	
348	Group 17-30	v2 mini	2026–014	22 January 2026, 05:47	Vandenberg, SLC-4E	535 km (332 mi)	97.61°	25		25	Success	
349	Group 17-20	v2 mini	2026–016	25 January 2026, 17:30	Vandenberg, SLC-4E	535 km (332 mi)	97.61°	25		25	Success	
350	Group 17-19	v2 mini	2026–018	29 January 2026, 17:53	Vandenberg, SLC-4E	535 km (332 mi)	97.61°	25		25	Success	
351	Group 6-101	v2 mini	2026–020	30 January 2026, 07:22	Cape Canaveral, SLC-40	559 km (347 mi)	43.0°	29		29	Success	
352	Group 17-32	v2 mini	2026–022	2 February 2026, 15:47	Vandenberg, SLC-4E	535 km (332 mi)	97.61°	25		25	Success	
353	Group 17-33	v2 mini	2026–025	7 February 2026, 20:58	Vandenberg, SLC-4E	535 km (332 mi)	97.61°	25		25	Success	
354	Group 17-34	v2 mini	2026–026	11 February 2026, 17:11	Vandenberg, SLC-4E	535 km (332 mi)	97.61°	24		24	Success	
355	Group 17-13	v2 mini	2026–032	15 February 2026, 01:59	Vandenberg, SLC-4E	535 km (332 mi)	97.61°	24		24	Success	
356	Group 6-103	v2 mini	2026–033	16 February 2026, 07:59	Cape Canaveral, SLC-40	559 km (347 mi)	43.0°	29		29	Success	
357	Group 10-36	v2 mini	2026–034	20 February 2026, 01:41	Cape Canaveral, SLC-40	279 km (173 mi)	53.16°	29		29	Success	
358	Group 17-25	v2 mini	2026–035	21 February 2026, 09:04	Vandenberg, SLC-4E	535 km (332 mi)	97.61°	25		25	Success	
359	Group 6-104	v2 mini	2026–036	22 February 2026, 03:47	Cape Canaveral, SLC-40	559 km (347 mi)	43.0°	28		28	Success	
360	Group 6-110	v2 mini	2026–037	24 February 2026, 23:04	Cape Canaveral, SLC-40	559 km (347 mi)	43.0°	29		29	Success	
361	Group 17-26	v2 mini	2026–038	25 February 2026, 14:18	Vandenberg, SLC-4E	535 km (332 mi)	97.61°	25		25	Success	
362	Group 6-108	v2 mini	2026–039	27 February 2026, 12:16	Cape Canaveral, SLC-40	559 km (347 mi)	43.0°	29		29	Success	
363	Group 17-23	v2 mini	2026–040	1 March 2026, 10:10	Vandenberg, SLC-4E	535 km (332 mi)	97.61°	25		25	Success	
364	Group 10-41	v2 mini	2026–041	2 March 2026, 02:56	Cape Canaveral, SLC-40	279 km (173 mi)	53.16°	29		29	Success	
365	Group 10-40	v2 mini	2026–042	4 March 2026, 10:52	Cape Canaveral, SLC-40	279 km (173 mi)	53.16°	29		29	Success	
366	Group 17-18	v2 mini	2026–044	8 March 2026, 14:00	Vandenberg, SLC-4E	535 km (332 mi)	97.61°	25		25	Success	
367	Group 17-31	v2 mini	2026–049	13 March 2026, 14:58	Vandenberg, SLC-4E	535 km (332 mi)	97.61°	25		25	Success	
368	Group 10-48	v2 mini	2026–050	14 March 2026, 12:37	Cape Canaveral, SLC-40	279 km (173 mi)	53.16°	29		29	Success	
369	Group 17-24	v2 mini	2026–053	17 March 2026, 05:19	Vandenberg, SLC-4E	535 km (332 mi)	97.61°	25		25	Success	
370	Group 10-46	v2 mini	2026–054	17 March 2026, 13:27	Cape Canaveral, SLC-40	279 km (173 mi)	53.16°	29		29	Success	
371	Group 10-33	v2 mini	2026–055	19 March 2026, 14:20	Cape Canaveral, SLC-40	279 km (173 mi)	53.16°	29		29	Success	
372	Group 17-15	v2 mini	2026–057	20 March 2026, 21:51	Vandenberg, SLC-4E	535 km (332 mi)	97.61°	25		25	Success	
373	Group 10-62	v2 mini	2026–059	22 March 2026, 14:47	Cape Canaveral, SLC-40	279 km (173 mi)	53.16°	29		29	Success	
374	Group 17-17	v2 mini	2026–063	26 March 2026, 23:03	Vandenberg, SLC-4E	535 km (332 mi)	97.61°	25		25	Success	
375	Group 10-44	v2 mini	2026–068	30 March 2026, 23:15	Cape Canaveral, SLC-40	279 km (173 mi)	53.16°	29		29	Success	
376	Group 10-58	v2 mini	2026–070	2 April 2026, 11:55	Cape Canaveral, SLC-40	279 km (173 mi)	53.16°	29		29	Success	
377	Group 17-35	v2 mini	2026–073	7 April 2026, 02:51	Vandenberg, SLC-4E	535 km (332 mi)	97.61°	25		25	Success	
378	Group 17-21	v2 mini	2026–077	11 April 2026, 05:04	Vandenberg, SLC-4E	535 km (332 mi)	97.61°	25		25	Success	
379	Group 10-24	v2 mini	2026–081	14 April 2026, 09:23	Cape Canaveral, SLC-40	279 km (173 mi)	53.16°	29		29	Success	
380	Group 17-27	v2 mini	2026–082	15 April 2026, 04:29	Vandenberg, SLC-4E	535 km (332 mi)	97.61°	25		25	Success	
381	Group 17-22	v2 mini	2026–086	19 April 2026, 16:03	Vandenberg, SLC-4E	535 km (332 mi)	97.61°	25		25	Success	
382	Group 17-14	v2 mini	2026–089	23 April 2026, 03:23	Vandenberg, SLC-4E	535 km (332 mi)	97.61°	24		24	Success	
383	Group 17-16	v2 mini	2026–094	26 April 2026, 14:37	Vandenberg, SLC-4E	535 km (332 mi)	97.61°	25		25	Success	
384	Group 17-36	v2 mini	2026–097	30 April 2026, 02:42	Vandenberg, SLC-4E	535 km (332 mi)	97.61°	24		24	Success	
385	Group 10-38	v2 mini	2026–099	1 May 2026, 18:06	Cape Canaveral, SLC-40	279 km (173 mi)	53.16°	29		29	Success	
386	Group 17-29	v2 mini	2026–101	6 May 2026, 03:59	Vandenberg, SLC-4E	535 km (332 mi)	97.61°	24		24	Success	
387	Group 17-42	v2 mini	2026–110	20 May 2026, 02:46	Vandenberg, SLC-4E	535 km (332 mi)	97.61°	24		24	Success	
388	Group 10-31	v2 mini	2026–111	21 May 2026, 10:04	Cape Canaveral, SLC-40	279 km (173 mi)	53.16°	29		29	Success	
389	Group 10-47	v2 mini	2026–114	25 May 2026, 11:48	Cape Canaveral, SLC-40	279 km (173 mi)	53.16°	29		29	Success	
390	Group 17-37	v2 mini	2026–115	26 May 2026, 14:50	Vandenberg, SLC-4E	535 km (332 mi)	97.61°	24		24	Success	
391	Group 10-53	v2 mini	2026–117	29 May 2026, 12:57	Cape Canaveral, SLC-40	279 km (173 mi)	53.16°	29		29	Success	
392	Group 17-41	v2 mini	2026–119	30 May 2026, 15:25	Vandenberg, SLC-4E	535 km (332 mi)	97.61°	24		24	Success	
393	Group 17-47	v2 mini	2026–122	3 June 2026, 15:40	Vandenberg, SLC-4E	535 km (332 mi)	97.61°	24		24	Success	
394	Group 10-43	v2 mini	2026–123	4 June 2026, 10:26	Cape Canaveral, SLC-40	279 km (173 mi)	53.16°	29		29	Success	
395	Group 17-43	v2 mini	2026–126	7 June 2026, 04:24	Vandenberg, SLC-4E	535 km (332 mi)	97.61°	21		21	Success	
396	Group 10-35	v2 mini	2026–127	8 June 2026, 10:13	Cape Canaveral, SLC-40	279 km (173 mi)	53.16°	29		29	Success	
397	Group 17-44	v2 mini	2026–131	11 June 2026, 15:05	Vandenberg, SLC-4E	535 km (332 mi)	97.61°	24		24	Success	
398	Group 10-54	v2 mini	2026–133	12 June 2026, 12:27	Cape Canaveral, SLC-40	279 km (173 mi)	53.16°	29		29	Success	
399	Group 17-54	v2 mini	2026–135	15 June 2026, 15:34	Vandenberg, SLC-4E	535 km (332 mi)	97.61°	24		24	Success	
400	Group 17-28	v2 mini	2026–143	21 June 2026, 16:39	Vandenberg, SLC-4E	535 km (332 mi)	97.61°	24		24	Success	
401	Group 17-45	v2 mini	2026–145	25 June 2026, 03:30	Vandenberg, SLC-4E	535 km (332 mi)	97.61°	24		24	Success	
402	Group 17-40	v2 mini	2026–147	28 June 2026, 16:09	Vandenberg, SLC-4E	535 km (332 mi)	97.61°	24		24	Success	
403	Group 17-46	v2 mini	2026–150	2 July 2026, 02:58	Vandenberg, SLC-4E	535 km (332 mi)	97.61°	24		24	Success	
404	Group 10-50	v2 mini	2026–154	5 July 2026, 10:50	Cape Canaveral, SLC-40	279 km (173 mi)	53.16°	29		29	Success	
405	Group 10-42	v2 mini	2026–157	9 July 2026, 09:25	Cape Canaveral, SLC-40	279 km (173 mi)	53.16°	29		29	Success	
406	Group 17-48	v2 mini	2026–159	11 July 2026, 03:01	Vandenberg, SLC-4E	535 km (332 mi)	97.61°	24		24	Success	
407	Group 15-14	v2 mini	2026–160	14 July 2026, 01:28	Vandenberg, SLC-4E	535 km (332 mi)	70.0°	27		27	Success	
408	Group 10-45	v2 mini	2026–161	14 July 2026, 09:10	Cape Canaveral, SLC-40	279 km (173 mi)	53.16°	29		29	Success	
409	Group 17-39	v2 mini	2026–166	21 July 2026, 14:49	Vandenberg, SLC-4E	535 km (332 mi)	97.61°	24		24	Success	
410	Group 17-51	v2 mini	2026–171	25 July 2026, 15:51	Vandenberg, SLC-4E	535 km (332 mi)	97.61°	24		24	Success	
411	Group 17-52	v2 mini	2026–175	1 August 2026, 03:08	Vandenberg, SLC-4E	535 km (332 mi)	97.61°	24		24	Success	
412	Group 17-53	v2 mini	2026–177	4 August 2026, 17:05	Vandenberg, SLC-4E	535 km (332 mi)	97.61°	24		24	Success	
413	Group 17-38	v2 mini	2026–181	8 August 2026, 16:35	Vandenberg, SLC-4E	535 km (332 mi)	97.61°	24		24	Success	
414	Group 10-19	v2 mini	2026–183	11 August 2026, 15:58	Cape Canaveral, SLC-40	279 km (173 mi)	53.16°	29		29	Success	
415	Group 17-49	v2 mini	2026–184	12 August 2026, 04:46	Vandenberg, SLC-4E	535 km (332 mi)	97.61°	24		24	Success	
416	Group 17-50	v2 mini	2026–190	19 August 2026, 04:01	Vandenberg, SLC-4E	535 km (332 mi)	97.61°	24		24	Success	
417	Group 10-39	v2 mini	2026–192	21 August 2026, 15:14	Cape Canaveral, SLC-40	279 km (173 mi)	53.16°	29		29	Success	
418	Group 15-20	v2 mini	2026–193	22 August 2026, 07:25	Vandenberg, SLC-4E	535 km (332 mi)	70.00°	27		27	Success	
419	Group 10-49	v2 mini	2026–196	25 August 2026, 09:33	Cape Canaveral, SLC-40	279 km (173 mi)	53.16°	29		29	Success	Last East Coast Starlink launch by Falcon 9.
420	Group 15-22	v2 mini	2026–197	26 August 2026, 09:35	Vandenberg, SLC-4E	535 km (332 mi)	70.00°	27		27	Success	
421	Group 15-23	v2 mini	2026–200	2 September 2026, 09:35	Vandenberg, SLC-4E	535 km (332 mi)	70.00°	27		27	Success	
422	Group 15-24	v2 mini	2026–204	6 September 2026, 14:26	Vandenberg, SLC-4E	535 km (332 mi)	70.00°	27		27	Success	
423	Group 15-27	v2 mini	2026–219	20 September 2026, 01:47	Vandenberg, SLC-4E	535 km (332 mi)	70.00°	27		27	Success	
424	Group 15-25	v2 mini	2026–232	13 October 2026, 00:28	Vandenberg, SLC-4E	535 km (332 mi)	70.00°	27		27	Success	
425	Group 15-15	v2 mini	2026–242	23 October 2026, 22:48	Vandenberg, SLC-4E	535 km (332 mi)	70.00°	27		27	Success	
426	Group 15-16	v2 mini	2026–244	27 October 2026, 07:25	Vandenberg, SLC-4E	535 km (332 mi)	70.00°	27		27	Success	
427	Group 15-18	v2 mini	2026–246	31 October 2026, 04:04	Vandenberg, SLC-4E	535 km (332 mi)	70.00°	27		27	Success	

==== Totals ====
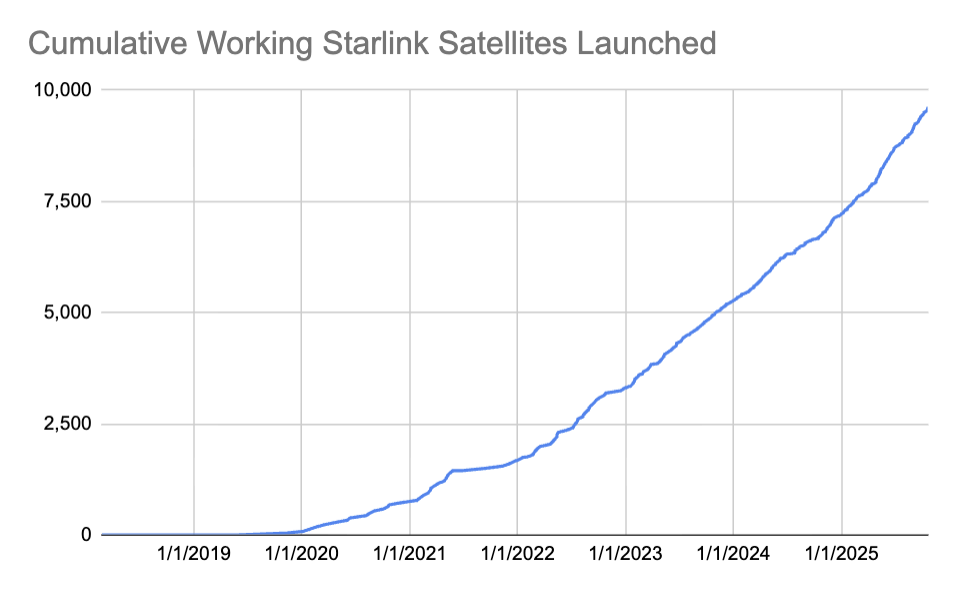
Cumulative working Starlink satellites launched through October 23, 2025

As of 31 October 2026:

- Satellites launched: 13,070
- Satellites failed or deorbited: 1,867
- Satellites in orbit: 11,217
- Satellites working: 11,203
- Satellites operational: 10,022

=== Starshield ===
Starshield launches
No.	Mission name or designation	Sat. ver.	COSPAR ID	Date and time, UTC	Launch site	Orbit		Satellites		Outcome	Customer
No.	Mission name or designation	Sat. ver.	COSPAR ID	Date and time, UTC	Launch site	Altitude	Orbital inclination	Deployed	Working	Outcome	Customer
–	USA 312-313	v1	2020–101	19 December 2020; 14:00:00	Kennedy, LC-39A	540 km (340 mi)	53°	2	2	Success	National Reconnaissance Office
–	USA 312-313	Possibly launched on NROL-108 mission. Likely test Starshield satellites.									
1	USA 320-323	v1.5	2022–002	13 January 2022; 15:25:38	Cape Canaveral, SLC-40	525 km (326 mi)	97.6°	4	1	Success	Unknown US Government Agency
1	USA 320-323	Likely test versions or operational Starshield satellites. Part of Transporter-3 (SmallSat Rideshare Mission 3).									
2	USA 328-331	v1.5	2022–064	19 June 2022; 04:27	Cape Canaveral, SLC-40	535 km (332 mi)	52°	4	4	Success	Unknown US Government Agency
2	USA 328-331	Likely test versions or operational Starshield satellites. Launched with Globalstar-2 FM-15 (M087) mission.									
3	Tracking Layer (Tranche 0A)	v1.5	2023–050	2 April 2023; 14:29	Vandenberg, SLC-4E	951 km (591 mi)	80.99°	2	2	Success	Space Development Agency
3	Tracking Layer (Tranche 0A)	Likely operational Starshield satellites. Hosts infrared payloads manufactured by Leidos. Launched with 8 York Space Systems-built Transport layer satellites on this mission.									
4	Tracking Layer (Tranche 0B)	v1.5	2023–133	2 September 2023; 14:25	Vandenberg, SLC-4E	951 km (591 mi)	80.99°	2	2	Success	Space Development Agency
4	Tracking Layer (Tranche 0B)	Likely operational Starshield satellites. Hosts infrared payloads manufactured by Leidos. Launched with one York Space Systems-built and 10 Lockheed Martin/Tyvak Space Systems-built Transport layer satellites on this mission.									
5	USA 350-351	v2 mini	2024–050	19 March 2024, 02:28	Vandenberg, SLC-4E	525 km (326 mi)	53.05°	2	2	Success	Unknown US Government Agency
5	USA 350-351	Launched as a part of Starlink Group 7-16 mission.									
6	USA 354-374	v2 mini	2024–096	22 May 2024; 08:00	Vandenberg, SLC-4E	310 km (190 mi)	69.7°	21	21	Success	National Reconnaissance Office
6	USA 354-374	Launched as a part of NROL-146 mission.									
7	USA 375-395	v2 mini	2024–121	29 June 2024; 03:14	Vandenberg, SLC-4E	310 km (190 mi)	69.7°	21	21	Success	National Reconnaissance Office
7	USA 375-395	Launched as a part of NROL-186 mission.									
8	USA 400-420	v2 mini	2024–160	6 September 2024; 03:20	Vandenberg, SLC-4E	310 km (190 mi)	70°	21	21	Success	National Reconnaissance Office
8	USA 400-420	Launched as a part of NROL-113 mission.									
9	USA 421-437	v2 mini	2024–192	24 October 2024; 17:13	Vandenberg, SLC-4E	310 km (190 mi)	70°	17	17	Success	National Reconnaissance Office
9	USA 421-437	Launched as a part of NROL-167 mission.									
10	USA 438-439	v2 mini	2024–225	30 November 2024; 08:10	Vandenberg, SLC-4E	310 km (190 mi)	70°	2	2	Success	National Reconnaissance Office
10	USA 438-439	Launched as a part of NROL-126 mission with Starlink Group N-01 mission.									
11	USA 441-462	v2 mini	2024–243	17 December 2024; 13:19	Vandenberg, SLC-4E	310 km (190 mi)	70°	22	22	Success	National Reconnaissance Office
11	USA 441-462	Launched as a part of NROL-149 mission.									
12	USA 463-484	v2 mini	2025–005	10 January 2025; 03:53	Vandenberg, SLC-4E	310 km (190 mi)	70°	22	22	Success	National Reconnaissance Office
12	USA 463-484	Launched as a part of NROL-153 mission.									
13	USA 485-486	v2 mini	2025–014	21 January 2025, 05:24	Kennedy, LC-39A	310 km (190 mi)	43°	2	2	Success	Unknown US Government Agency
13	USA 485-486	Launched as a part of Starlink Group 13-1 mission.									
14	USA 487-497	v2 mini (?)	2025–058	21 March 2025; 06:49	Vandenberg, SLC-4E	310 km (190 mi)	70°	11	11	Success	National Reconnaissance Office
14	USA 487-497	Launched as a part of NROL-57 mission. Based on the number of gaps in the catalog it appears that this launch only deployed 11 payloads, likely indicating a larger Starshield version.									
15	USA 499-520	v2 mini	2025–071	12 April 2025; 12:25	Vandenberg, SLC-4E	310 km (190 mi)	70°	22	22	Success	National Reconnaissance Office
15	USA 499-520	Launched as a part of NROL-192 mission.									
16	USA 523-544	v2 mini	2025–079	19 April 2025; 12:47	Vandenberg, SLC-4E	310 km (190 mi)	70°	22	22	Success	National Reconnaissance Office
16	USA 523-544	Launched as a part of NROL-145 mission. First NRO Proliferated Architecture Mission launch in partnership with USSF under the NSSL Phase 3 Lane 1 contract.									
17	USA 549-550	v2 mini	2025–165	31 July 2025, 18:35	Vandenberg, SLC-4E	559 km (347 mi)	97.6°	2	2	Success	Unknown US Government Agency
17	USA 549-550	Launched as a part of Starlink Group 13-4 mission.									
18	USA 558-565	v2 mini	2025–189	22 September 2025; 17:38	Vandenberg, SLC-4E	310 km (190 mi)	70°	8	8	Success	National Reconnaissance Office
18	USA 558-565	Launched as a part of NROL-48 mission.									
19	USA 572-580	v2 mini	2026–011	17 January 2026; 04:39	Vandenberg, SLC-4E	310 km (190 mi)	70°	9	9	Success	National Reconnaissance Office
19	USA 572-580	Launched as a part of NROL-105 mission.									
20	USA 586-607	v2 mini	2026–103	12 May 2026; 02:13	Vandenberg, SLC-4E	310 km (190 mi)	70°	22	22	Success	National Reconnaissance Office
20	USA 586-607	Launched as a part of NROL-172 mission.									
21	USA 608-609	v2 mini	2026–126	7 June 2026, 04:24	Vandenberg, SLC-4E	535 km (332 mi)	97.61°	2	2	Success	Unknown US Government Agency
21	USA 608-609	Launched as a part of Starlink Group 17-43 mission.									
22	USA 610-618	v2 mini	2026–141	19 June 2026; 08:50	Vandenberg, SLC-4E	310 km (190 mi)	70°	22	22	Success	National Reconnaissance Office
22	USA 610-618	Launched as a part of NROL-179 mission.									
23	USA 620-642	v2 mini	2026–141	16 August 2026; 01:50	Vandenberg, SLC-4E	310 km (190 mi)	70°	23	23	Success	United States Space Force
23	USA 620-642	Launched as a part of mission codenamed, USSF-366 (SBST R-1), suspected to be part of the new Starshield-based Space Data Network Backbone.									
24	USA 644-666	v2 mini	2026–206	10 September 2026; 15:42	Vandenberg, SLC-4E	310 km (190 mi)	70°	23	23	Success	United States Space Force
24	USA 644-666	Launched as a part of mission codenamed, USSF-153 (SBST R-2), suspected to be part of the new Starshield-based Space Data Network Backbone.									
25	USA 668-684	v2 mini	2026–214	17 September 2026; 01:07	Vandenberg, SLC-4E	320 km (200 mi)	80°	17	17	Success	United States Space Force
25	USA 668-684	Launched as a part of mission codenamed, USSF-259 (SBST TH-1), suspected to be part of the new Starshield-based Space Data Network Backbone.									
26	USA 685-707	v2 mini	2026–224	26 September 2026; 14:00	Vandenberg, SLC-4E	320 km (200 mi)	80°	23	23	Success	United States Space Force
26	USA 685-707	Launched as a part of mission codenamed, USSF-385 (SBST R-3), suspected to be part of the new Starshield-based Space Data Network Backbone.									
27	USA 709-725	v2 mini	2026–235	16 October 2026; 00:01	Vandenberg, SLC-4E	320 km (200 mi)	80°	17	17	Success	United States Space Force
27	USA 709-725	Launched as a part of mission codenamed, USSF-481 (SBST TH-2), suspected to be part of the new Starshield-based Space Data Network Backbone.									
26	USA 726-748	v2 mini	2026–251	7 November 2026; 00:48	Vandenberg, SLC-4E	320 km (200 mi)	80°	23	23	Success	United States Space Force
26	USA 726-748	Launched as a part of mission codenamed, USSF-432 (SBST R-4), suspected to be part of the new Starshield-based Space Data Network Backbone.									
26	USA 749-771	v2 mini	2026–255	12 November 2026; 04:36	Vandenberg, SLC-4E	320 km (200 mi)	80°	23	23	Success	United States Space Force
26	USA 749-771	Launched as a part of mission codenamed, USSF-627 (SBST R-5), suspected to be part of the new Starshield-based Space Data Network Backbone.									

== Starship launches ==
=== Starlink launches ===
SpaceX launches larger and more capable Starlink satellites on Starship, a rocket with a much larger payload capacity than Falcon 9.

Starlink launches
No.	Mission	Sat. ver.	COSPAR ID	Launch date, time (UTC)	Launch site	Orbit		Satellites			Outcome	Remarks
No.	Mission	Sat. ver.	COSPAR ID	Launch date, time (UTC)	Launch site	Altitude	Inclination	Deployed	w/DtC	Working	Outcome	Remarks
–	Simulators 1	v3	2025-F01	16 January 2025; 22:37:00	Starbase, OLP-1	146 km (91 mi)	26.4°	0	0	0	Failure	SpaceX planned to test the deployment system for a new version of their Starlink satellites. S33 was also expected to deploy ten Starlink "simulators," which were also expected to reenter over the Indian Ocean. Contact with S33 was lost shortly before its engines were scheduled to shut down.
–	Simulators 2	v3	2025-F03	4 March 2025; 23:30:00	Starbase, OLP-1	146 km (91 mi)	26.4°	0	0	0	Failure	Redo of last flight with fewer satellites, while failed again due to similar issues as Flight 7.
–	Simulators 3	v3	2025-U02	27 May 2025; 23:36:28	Starbase, OLP-1	146 km (91 mi)	26.4°	0	0	0	Failure	Aborted as payload bay door failed to open due to a pressure differential inside of the vehicle, due to a failed fuel diffuser.
–	Simulators 4	v3	2025-U02	26 August 2025; 23:30	Starbase, OLP-1	146 km (91 mi)	26.4°	8	0	0	Success	First successful deployment of Starlink simulators. All burned upon re-entry as the launch was suborbital and Starlinks cannot maneuver themselves into orbit.
–	Simulators 6	v3,v2	2026-U02	22 May 2026; 23:33	Starbase, OLP-2	146 km (91 mi)	26.4°	22	0	0	Success	All burned upon re-entry as the launch was suborbital and Starlinks cannot maneuver themselves into orbit. The starlink consisted of 20 Starlink V3 simulator and 2 Modified Dodger-Dog Starlink V2 satellites.
–	Group GS-0	v3	2026-U04	24 July 2026; 22:51	Starbase, OLP-2	146 km (91 mi)	26.4°	20	0	0	Success	All burned upon re-entry as the launch was suborbital and Starlinks cannot maneuver themselves into orbit. The starlink consisted of 20 Starlink V3 satellites. First launch of production Starlink V3 satellites. SpaceX engineers were able to successfully communicate with every satellite using radio frequency and laser links and downloaded key telemetry from the satellites.
1	Group 31-1	v3	2026–225	28 September 2026; 12:48	Starbase, OLP-2	559 km (347 mi)	43.0°	26	0	26	Success	First operational batch of Starship-launched, starlink satellites to a dedicated group/shell. First Starship-launched, starlinks and first V3 starlinks in orbit.
2	Group 31-2	v3	2026–256	14 November 2026; 21:17	Starbase, OLP-2	559 km (347 mi)	43.0°	26	0	26	Success	

== See also ==
- List of Falcon 9 and Falcon Heavy launches
- List of Falcon 9 first-stage boosters
- List of Starship launches
- Starlink in the Russo-Ukrainian War
