= SHERPA (space tug) =

Commercial satellite dispenser

SHERPA is a commercial satellite dispenser developed by Andrews Space, a subsidiary of Spaceflight Industries, and was unveiled in 2012. The maiden flight was on 3 December 2018 on a Falcon 9 Block 5 rocket, and it consisted of two separate unpropelled variants of the dispenser.

Riding atop the launcher's final stage, SHERPA's release follows deployment of the primary mission payload for the dispensing of minisatellites, microsatellites, or nanosatellites such as CubeSats. SHERPA builds upon the capabilities of the Spaceflight Secondary Payload System (SSPS) by incorporating propulsion and power generation subsystems, which creates a propulsive tug dedicated to maneuvering to an optimal orbit to place secondary and hosted payloads.

== Overview ==
SHERPA is a three-axis stabilized platform capable of on-orbit maneuvering meant to deploy small satellites carried as secondary payloads on rideshare orbital launches. SHERPA is integrated to the rocket as a standard adapter that is designed to fit on the SpaceX Falcon 9, Orbital Sciences Corp.'s Antares, and United Launch Alliance's Atlas V and Delta rockets. SHERPA is to be separated from the launch vehicle prior to any deployments.

SHERPA is a commercial derivative of the ESPA Grande ring, and it was developed and manufactured by Andrews Space, a subsidiary of Spaceflight Industries since 2010 and was unveiled in May 2012. Spaceflight Industries fabricates SHERPA, and the SSPS, at its facility in Tukwila, Washington.

Riding atop the launcher's final stage, SHERPA is to be separated from the launch vehicle prior to any deployments or dispensing of minisatellites, microsatellites, nanosatellites and CubeSats. SHERPA features an optional propulsion system to place its payloads in an orbit other than the primary payload's orbit. The powered variants are capable of large orbit change.

SHERPA's first mission was to deploy 90 small payloads, during a 2015 launch on a Falcon 9 rocket, then it was rescheduled for 2017, but delays caused in part by a Falcon 9 rocket explosion on a launch pad in 2016, prompted Spaceflight to cancel the mission.

SpaceX appears to have severed ties with Spaceflight Inc., but has continued to fly manifested missions with the last launch on 25 May 2022.

== Variants ==
=== Standard SHERPA ===
There are at least five SHERPA variants: SHERPA (non-propelled), SHERPA 400, 1000, 2200 and FX. Each SHERPA is able to be launched in a stacked configuration with other SHERPA modules for later separation and independent free-flying.

SHERPA

The basic SHERPA is based on a commonly used secondary payload adapter known as an ESPA ring and it is not propelled. It is used for low Earth orbit deployments, and can unfurl a dragsail to lower its orbit before payload deployment.

SHERPA 400

The 400 variant is used for low Earth orbit deployments, and it features two tanks with mono-propellant. SHERPA 400 has a fueled mass of 1,000 kilograms and it has a maximum capacity of 1,500 kg (3,300 lb) to low Earth orbit. It is capable of accompanying a primary payload to 800 km and then lower its orbit to a more favorable altitude to drop off secondaries. Most small satellites are required to orbit at about 450 kilometers to deorbit or move to an unused orbit within 25 years of the mission's completion.

SHERPA 1000

This variant features additional monopropellant volume stored in 4 tanks.

SHERPA 2200

The 2200 variant has a fueled mass of 2,000 kg and it features a more powerful bi-propellant fuel (stored in 4 tanks) for the delivery of small payloads to geostationary transfer orbit (GTO) as well as the lunar environs. GTO is a highly elliptical Earth orbit with an apogee of 42,164 km (26,199 mi).

=== SHERPA-NG ===
SHERPA-FX

The FX variant, intended to be flown on board a SpaceX Falcon 9 Block 5 is an optional third stage for delivery of deployable and hosted payloads in low earth orbit (LEO) and polar orbit (SSO).

SHERPA-AC

Augmented version of the free-flying SHERPA-FX equipped with attitude knowledge & control capabilities and a flight computer, optimized for hosted payloads.

SHERPA-LTC

SHERPA LTC builds on SHERPA-AC by adding a bi-propellant propulsion system to deliver satellites and hosted payloads to low earth orbit (LEO) and polar orbit (SSO). Propulsion system by Benchmark Space Systems uses high test peroxide and isopropanol as propellants, with four pressure-fed 22 N thrusters.

SHERPA-LTE

SHERPA LTE builds on SHERPA-AC by adding a Hall effect electric propulsion system to deliver satellites and hosted payloads to Geostationary orbit (GEO), Cislunar, or Earth-escape orbits.

SHERPA-ES

SHERPA-ES (SHERPA EScape) is a high-energy SHERPA-NG variant that will utilize the same bi-propellant propulsion system as SHERPA-LTC with 6 times more propellant to deliver satellites and hosted payloads to geostationary and cislunar orbits. The first flight of this variant, designated "GEO Pathfinder", is planned for early 2025 as a rideshare on the IM-2 mission.

== Flight history ==
Flight	Version	Date / time	Launch vehicle	Orbit	Remarks	Outcome
1	SHERPA	3 December 2018, 18:34:05	F9 B5 ♺ B1046-3	SSO	The first launch of SHERPA was on 3 December 2018 on a rideshare mission called SSO-A: SmallSat Express. The two SHERPA dispensers were originally planned to deploy more than 70 small satellites from 18 countries, which included 15 microsatellites and 56 CubeSats carried on two separate SHERPA dispensers. However, later changes reduced the number of satellites to 64. Both dispensers separated from the Falcon 9 rocket once it entered a polar Sun-synchronous orbit around 575 kilometers above Earth. Both dispensers in this mission lacked propulsion, but unfurled dragsails to lower their altitude as needed for sequential payload release. The total payload mass riding on this Falcon 9 Block 5 rocket was approximately 4 metric tons (4,000 kg).	Success
2	SHERPA-FX1	24 January 2021, 15:00	F9 B5 ♺ B1058-5	SSO	First launch of SHERPA-FX. Carried 3 microsats, 10 cubesats and 2 hosted payloads as a part of Transporter-1 (SmallSat Rideshare Mission 1).	Success
3	SHERPA-FX2	30 June 2021, 19:31	F9 B5 ♺ B1060-8	SSO	Second launch of SHERPA-FX. Carried 3 microsats, 21 cubesats and 1 hosted payloads as a part of Transporter-2 (SmallSat Rideshare Mission 12).	Success
3	SHERPA-LTE1	30 June 2021, 19:31	F9 B5 ♺ B1060-8	SSO	First launch of SHERPA-LTE. Carried 3 microsats and 8 cubesats as a part of Transporter-2 (SmallSat Rideshare Mission 12).	Success
4	SHERPA-AC1	25 May 2022, 18:35	F9 B5 ♺ B1061-8	SSO	First launch of SHERPA-AC. Carried 2 hosted payloads as a part of Transporter-5 rideshare mission.	Success
5	SHERPA-LTC2	5 September 2022, 02:09	F9 B5 ♺ B1052-7	mid-inclination	Starlink Group 4-20 rideshare. Carries Boeing's Varuna-TDM as sole hosted payload.	Success
X	SHERPA-LTC1	Cancelled	F9 B5 ♺ B10xx-x	SSO	Removed from rideshare launch after post-integration propellant leak.	Cancelled
6	SHERPA-ES	27 February 2025, 24:00	F9 B5 ♺ B10xx-x	Selenocentric	Spaceflight's "GEO Pathfinder" rideshare mission will be conducted via the Sherpa-ES transfer vehicle.	Planned
