= EELV Secondary Payload Adapter =

Spacecraft-rocket stage connector used as an American spaceflight industry standard

The EELV Secondary Payload Adapter (ESPA) is an adapter for launching secondary payloads on orbital launch vehicles.

Originally developed for US launch vehicles in the 2000s to launch secondary payloads on space missions of the United States Department of Defense that used the Atlas V and Delta IV, the adapter design has become a de facto standard and is now also used for spaceflight missions on non-governmental private spacecraft missions as well. For example, multiple ESPA rings were used on a non-DoD launch of the SpaceX Falcon 9 that carried the Orbcomm OG-2 constellation of communication satellites.

The use of ESPA ring technology reduces launch costs for the primary mission and enables secondary and even tertiary missions with minimal impact to the original mission.

== History ==
Development was funded by the Air Force Research Laboratory Space Vehicles Directorate (AFRL/RV) for the United States Department of Defense (DoD) Space Test Program (STP) under a Small Business Innovative Research (SBIR) grant in the late 1990s. Moog CSA Engineering teamed with AFRL to design, build and qualify the ring in the early 2000s. Additional studies have been done on ESPA applications for lunar and science missions under an SBIR from NASA Ames Research Center. As of 2010, the ring is produced by Moog CSA Engineering. A number of missions have used the ESPA ring. The ESPA ring's maiden mission was on STP-1 in 2007. As of December 2015, the ESPA ring had been used on all 3 EELV-class rockets (Atlas V, Delta IV and Falcon 9).

Multiple ESPA rings may be used on a single launch, stacked to increase the satellite carrying capacity. Two ESPA Grande rings were used on Orbcomm OG-2 flight 1 in 2014 and three stacked Grande rings for the 11-satellite Orbcomm OG-2 flight 2 deployment in 2015.

== Technical characteristics ==
The initial ESPA ring was designed to support a 15,000-pound (6,800 kg) primary payload and up to six 400-pound (180 kg) secondary payloads. Each secondary spacecraft is mounted radially on a 15 inches (380 mm) diameter port and is allocated 24 inches (610 mm) × 28 inches (710 mm) × 38 inches (970 mm) volume. This has led to the colloquial designation of ESPA-class payloads. The design includes a standard electrical interface for the attached payloads; however mission-specific requirements may preclude each secondary payload from receiving more than a single, non-redundant payload separation signal.

ESPA Grande ports are 24 inches (610 mm) in diameter, and can support 700-pound (320 kg) payloads of 42 inches (1,100 mm) × 46 inches (1,200 mm) × 38 inches (970 mm) volume. Each 24 inch port has 36 fastener bolts.

Moog's version of the ESPA Grande supports up to 1,543-pound (700 kg) payloads.

The lower and upper rims of the ESPA rings have 120 bolts holes with their centres on a 62.01" (1575 mm) diameter circle. This is a primary payload interface, the EELV Standard Interface Plane, defined as part of the Evolved Expendable Launch Vehicle program. The standard ESPA ring is 24 inches tall.

== Derivatives ==
Derivatives of the ESPA ring include satellite dispensers, space tugs and satellite buses.

=== SHERPA ===
Commercial derivatives of the ESPA Grande ring include the Spaceflight Secondary Payload System (SSPS) and SHERPA developed and manufactured by Andrews Space under contract to Spaceflight Services. SSPS includes five 24 inches (61 cm)-diameter ports, each capable of carrying payloads weighing up 300 kilograms (660 lb). "The SSPS operates very similar to a standalone spacecraft with a flight computer, electrical power system, orbit determination capability, and payload power switching." SHERPA is a powered variant of SSPS capable of large orbit change.

=== LCROSS ===
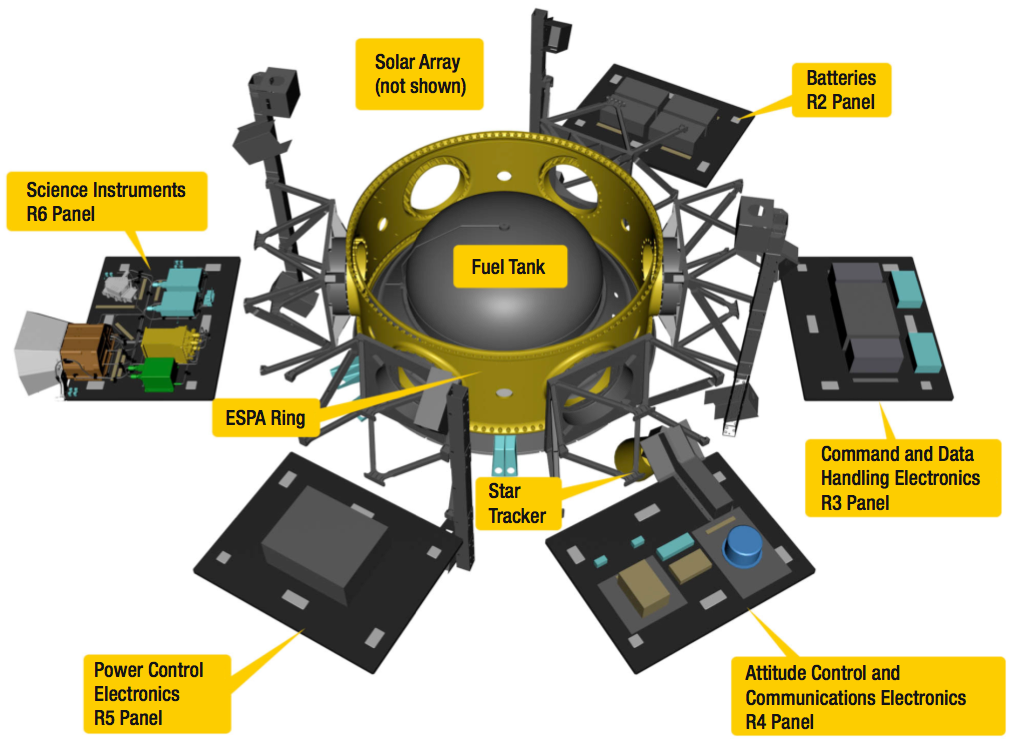
LCROSS spacecraft (exploded view)

When NASA upgraded its Lunar Reconnaissance Orbiter (LRO) mission's launch vehicle to an Atlas V, it freed around 2,200 lbs. of additional mass for what would later become the Lunar Crater Observation and Sensing Satellite (LCROSS). NASA held a competition to see how best to use the space and a number of proposals came from the Ames Research Center. The winning proposal included Moog CSA Engineering's ESPA ring serving as the base mechanical satellite bus to launch the LCROSS spacecraft as a secondary payload under the LRO. LCROSS ultimately impacted the lunar surface and confirmed the presence of water ice.

The LCROSS Lunar-impact water detection mission in 2009 took advantage of the structural capabilities of ESPA ring to attach all six of its science experiments, command and control systems, communications equipment, batteries, solar panels, and even a small monopropellant propulsion system to implement pre-impact payload separation and control.

=== ESPAStar ===
The ESPAStar is a comparable design concept by Orbital Sciences Corporation. Its maiden flight was on the AFSPC-11 mission as the EAGLE secondary payload.

=== Long Duration Propulsive ESPA (LDPE) ===
The LDPE (Long Duration Propulsive ESPA) is based on a Northrop Grumman payload adapter making it a fully operational space tug capable of deploying different payloads at different orbits.

The first LDPE was launched on 7 December 2021 on an Atlas V rocket as part of the STP-3 mission. It carried the Ascent cubesat from the Air Force Research Laboratory that was used to test commercial off-the-shelf technologies in geosynchronous orbit, including cold gas thrusters, electric propulsion, and a global position receiver.

A second LDPE was launched on 1 November 2022 on a Falcon Heavy rocket as part of the USSF-44 mission, and it carried three separable payloads and three hosted payloads. The separable payloads included Alpine, a cubesat from Millennium Space Systems to demonstrate GEO small satellite designs and leverage commercial GEO communications; LINUSS, a Lockheed Martin project consisting of two 12U cubesats to test GEO satellite servicing; and Tetra-1, an SSC small satellite designed as a pathfinder for innovative methods of space vehicle design and on-orbit Tactics Techniques and Procedures development. The hosted payloads included: Mustang, a small sized communications experiment; Xenon, a commercial off-the-shelf component maturation for flight at GEO; and Energetic Charged Particle-Lite, an SSC space weather sensor.

A third LDPE was launched on 15 January 2023 on a Falcon Heavy as part of the USSF-67 mission, and it carried five hosted payloads. Among those, two belonged to the Space Systems Command: Catcher, a prototype sensor to provide local space domain awareness insights, and WASSAT, a sensor consisting of four cameras to search for and track other spacecraft and space debris. The other three payloads have been provided by the Space Rapid Capabilities Office and included two prototypes for space situational awareness missions and one to test encrypted space-to-ground communications.
