= Spaceflight Industries =

American aerospace company

- Type: Private
- Industry: Aerospace
- Founded: 2009; 17 years ago
- Founder: Jason Andrews
- Headquarters: Herndon, Virginia, United States
- Subsidiaries: BlackSky Global LLC; LeoStella LLC (joint venture with Thales Alenia Space)
- Website: spaceflight.com

Spaceflight Industries, Inc. is an American private aerospace company based out of Herndon, Virginia, that specializes in geospatial intelligence services. It sold its satellite rideshare business, Spaceflight, Inc., in June 2020.

Spaceflight Industries has two primary business services: BlackSky Global, their geospatial intelligence service, and LeoStella, a joint venture with Thales Alenia Space to manufacture small satellites.

== History ==
Spaceflight Industries was founded in 2009 as Spaceflight Services by Jason Andrews, with Curt Blake joining soon thereafter as SVP and General Counsel. Prior to founding Spaceflight, Jason Andrews worked at Kistler Aerospace and founded Andrews Space in 1999. Jason Blake has previous experience at Microsoft, Starwave, SpaceDev, and GotVoice.

Spaceflight Services purchased excess capacity from commercial launch vehicles and resold it to a number of "rideshare" secondary payloads, along with providing integration and certification services. By integrating all of the secondary satellites as one discrete unit to the launch vehicle, they were able to provide a significant price discount to reach orbit compared to buying an entire launch vehicle.

Blacksky Global was founded in 2013 as an independent company owned by Spaceflight specializing in imaging-as-a-service.

Spaceflight Networks was started in 2014 to provide a network of ground stations for low-latency communication with cubesats and other small satellites.

In 2015, Spaceflight Services, Spaceflight Systems (formerly Andrews Space), and Spaceflight Networks, were consolidated under the Spaceflight Industries brand. The same year, Blacksky announced plans for a constellation of 60 satellites that would provide low-cost satellite imagery of any location on Earth within 90 minutes.

In March 2018, Spaceflight and Thales Alenia Space announced a joint venture, LeoStella, to build small satellites. LeoStella opened its production facility in February 2019.

In 2020, Spaceflight Industries sold its rideshare business, Spaceflight, Inc. to Mitsui and Yamasa. BlackSky was not part of this deal.

Through a business combination with Osprey Technology Acquisition Corp. (a SPAC), in September 2021 Blacksky became a separate company quoted on the NYSE (ticker: BKSY). The business combination grossed over $280 million in capital to fund Blacksky's growth plan. At the time, BlackSky Global constellation had seven satellites in low Earth orbit; the planned full complement for the constellation was at the time 30 satellites.

== BlackSky ==
BlackSky started out as a subsidiary of Spaceflight Industries as its geospatial intelligence service, to offer on-demand images from a constellation of satellites. Their first satellite, BlackSky Pathfinder-1, was launched on 26 September 2016, and the first pictures were released publicly on 14 November 2016. In late 2018, BlackSky launched BlackSky Global-1 and BlackSky Global-2, two of the company's next generation global satellites, aboard the SSO-A mission. The company was aiming for a 60-satellite constellation, which would offer 1-meter resolution and rapid satellite revisit rates. The satellite constellation was being built by LeoStella LLC, a joint venture between Spaceflight Industries and Thales Alenia Space. BlackSky Global-3 and BlackSky Global-4 satellites were launched aboard a Rocket Lab Electron rocket in August 2019, and BlackSky Global-7 and BlackSky Global-8 were launched in August 2020 as part of the SXRS-1 rideshare mission. BlackSky Global-9 was launched 22 March 2021 on an Electron Photon but two more on an Electron KS on 15 May 2021 failed. Two further BlackSky satellites were launched and successfully deployed into orbit on April 2, 2022 by Rocket Lab aboard another Electron rocket.

In January 2020, BlackSky received a contract from the U.S. Army to prototype satellites with 50-centimeter resolution. In September 2020, they unveiled their third generation of satellites, scheduled to launch in 2022, that would provide 50-centimeter resolution imagery. They also announced that 16 of the second generation satellites would be launched before phasing in the third-generation units.

Satellite	Launch Vehicle	Launch Date
BlackSky Pathfinder 1	PSLV-G	26.09.2016
BlackSky Global 1	PSLV-CA	29.11.2018
BlackSky Global 2	Falcon-9 v1.2 (Block 5)	03.12.2018
BlackSky Global 3	Electron	29.06.2019
BlackSky Global 4	Electron	19.08.2019
BlackSky Global 7	Falcon-9 v1.2 (Block 5)	07.08.2020
BlackSky Global 8	Falcon-9 v1.2 (Block 5)	07.08.2020
BlackSky Global 9	Electron	22.03.2021
BlackSky Global 10	Electron	15.05.2021 Launch failure
BlackSky Global 11	Electron	15.05.2021 Launch failure
BlackSky Global 14	Electron	18.11.2021
BlackSky Global 15	Electron	18.11.2021
BlackSky Global 12	Falcon-9 v1.2 (Block 5)	02.12.2021
BlackSky Global 13	Falcon-9 v1.2 (Block 5)	02.12.2021
BlackSky Global 16	Electron	09.12.2021
BlackSky Global 17	Electron	09.12.2021
BlackSky Global 18	Electron	02.04.2022
BlackSky Global 20	Electron	02.04.2022
BlackSky Global 19	Electron	24.03.2023
BlackSky Global 5	Electron	24.03.2023
BlackSky Global 31	Electron	18.02.2025
BlackSky Global 32	Electron	02.06.2025
BlackSky Global x	SSLV	TBD
BlackSky Global y	SSLV	TBD
