= Jason Andrews =

American businessman

- Education: University of Washington
- Occupations: Space and Technology Entrepreneur.
- Organization: Spaceflight inc.
- Awards: Andrews was named a 40 Under 40 Awardee by the Puget Sound Business Journal in 2006.; Andrews named 'Newsmaker of the Year' by Geekwire.

Jason Andrews is an American space and technology entrepreneur. He co-founded with his wife Marian Joh, Andrews Space in 1999, founded Spaceflight Inc. in 2010, BlackSky Global LLC in 2013, and integrated all three entities together in 2015 under Spaceflight Industries.

== Early life and education ==
Andrews grew up in Seattle, Washington and attended the University of Washington where he graduated with a BS in Aerospace Engineering. In 1995, he joined Kistler Aerospace in Kirkland Washington, one of the early space startups developing a fully reusable two stage launch vehicle to serve the emerging LEO communications market. His first role was as launch vehicle performance analyst, where he developed the "rocket back" trajectory to recover the first stage at the launch site. Andrews then led the Kistler propulsion system development contracts with Pratt & Whitney and Aerojet, and went on to manage the K-1 vehicle integration team located in El Segundo, California.

== Andrews Space, Inc. ==
Andrews left Kistler in late 1998 and started Andrews Space & Technology in July 1999; the name was shortened to Andrews Space in 2003. The company's first two contracts were a NASA Phase 1 SBIR to develop the Mini-Mag Orion Propulsion System, and supporting Buzz Aldrin's company Starcraft Boosters. Andrews led day-to-day operations as president, working with his father (Dana Andrews - CTO) and wife (Marian Joh - CEO).

In 2007 the firm diversified into space hardware and acquired Automated Controlled Environments Inc (ACEi), a company focused on nanosat subsystems. Andrews was one of the first people to identify and articulate the “killer app” for cubesats and nanosats: deployment of swarms of spacecraft to observe the planet in near real time. From 2008 to 2012 his firm developed a series of cubesat and nanosat products, many as part of a contract with the US Army Space and Missile Defense Command (SMDC) to study how to “put UAVs in space”, which required deploying a constellation of nanosats to observe the planet in near real time. This effort would evolve into the Kestrel Eye 2 spacecraft development effort.

== Spaceflight, Inc. ==
In 2009 Andrews founded Spaceflight Inc as the first “commercial spaceline”; the company did not build or own rockets, but instead provided space transportation services via rideshare on all existing rockets. Spaceflight addressed the emerging need to launch cubesats and nanosats, vehicles that were too small to buy their own launch vehicles. Spaceflight established classes of launch services by volume and mass for satellites weighing up to 1,000 kilogram, and published list pricing. Over the next eight years the firm built a $75 million a year business.

Spaceflight signed its first customer contract in October 2011 with Cosmogia (which later changed its name to Planet Labs, and then just Planet). It conducted its first two launches in April 2013, which launched within hours of each other: one on a Russian Soyuz launch vehicle and the other on the maiden launch of the Orbital Antares launch vehicle. From 2013 to 2018 the company launched over 210 spacecraft for different customers.

== BlackSky Global LLC ==
In 2013 Andrews founded BlackSky Global LLC to build the infrastructure to observe the planet in real time with a constellation of 1 meter resolution satellites to provide near real time observations (giving revisit rates measured in hours or minutes versus days) to complement existing high resolution spacecraft. The network of satellites could be used to direct high performing space assets to monitor conflict and critical infrastructure. BlackSky operated in "stealth mode" for two years, and was formally unveiled in June 2015 at the GeoInt Conference based on a Pathfinder launch planned for later that year. Two weeks after the GeoInt Conference a SpaceX Falcon 9 exploded in flight, significantly delaying the launch of the Pathfinder spacecraft.

== Spaceflight Networks ==
In August 2014 Andrews unveiled plans for Spaceflight Networks at the SmallSat Conference in Logan, UT. The company was already planning a series of commercial ground stations to support the then unannounced BlackSky constellation. The business plan was to sell excess capacity on the BlackSky communication network and establish a set of communication standards and radios to further accelerate the growth of the satellite ecosystem. This business was eventually put on hold so that available resources could be focused on operating the existing businesses and building the BlackSky constellation.

== Spaceflight Industries, Inc. ==
In 2015 Andrews integrated all three corporate entities under Spaceflight Industries, the parent corporate entity, with the ability to build, launch and operate spacecraft. Andrews led the firm as its president, CEO and chairman, overseeing operations at the operating companies. Coincident with this event, Spaceflight Industries closed a $21.5 million Series B investment led by venture capital firms Vulcan and RRE.

BlackSky's business plan centered around revolutionizing the price point, frequency and user experience of satellite based imagery by developing a compelling user experience to achieve its commercial potential. In June 2016 Andrews lead the acquisition of OpenWhere Inc. of Herndon VA, which had a unique cloud-based geospatial intelligence platform. Coincident with this acquisition Spaceflight Industries closed a $25 million Series B-1 investment led by Mithril Capital.

In September 2016 following lengthy delays, BlackSky launched the Pathfinder-1 spacecraft on an Indian PSLV. The spacecraft met its demonstration objectives and validated the spacecraft economics (size and price) to enable the overall BlackSky business plan.

In March 2018 Spaceflight Industries closed a $150 million Series C investment led by Thales Alenia Space (TAS) and Mitsui to fund the construction and launch of twenty (20) BlackSky spacecraft. As part of this investment, Spaceflight Industries and TAS created a 50/50 joint venture, LeoStella, to produce the spacecraft for the BlackSky constellation based on the design developed by Spaceflight Industries.

In October 2018 Spaceflight Industries was listed as one of the most valuable startups in the Seattle area with a valuation of $750 million.

== Orbite Inc. ==
Jason Andrews co-founded Orbite with Nicolas Gaume in 2019. The company is building its "Spaceflight Gateway and Astronaut Training Complex" for commercial astronaut training in a yet to be disclosed U.S. location. Orbite has tapped world-renowned architect Philippe Starck to design its complex.

== Awards and recognition ==
- Andrews was named a 40 Under 40 Awardee by the Puget Sound Business Journal in 2006
- Andrews named 'Newsmaker of the Year' by Geekwire
- Andrews named 'Innovator of the Month" by the Puget Sound Business Journal
- Spaceflight Industries named one of top five small satellite startups revolutionizing EO by GeoSpatial World
