= Secondary payload =

Launch of small spacecraft together with larger one

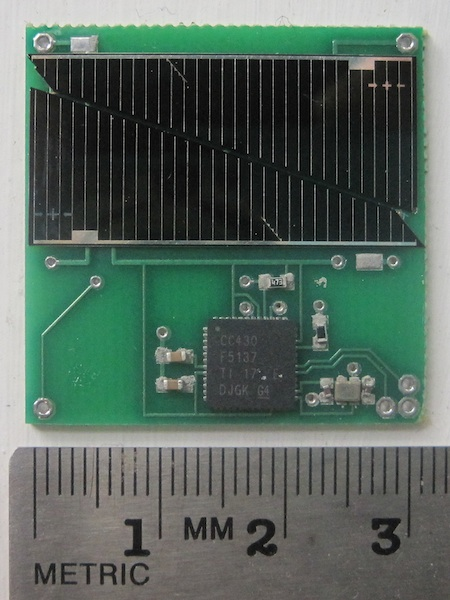
KickSat Sprites were secondary payloads of SpaceX CRS-3.

Secondary payload, also known as rideshare payload, is a smaller-sized payload transported to orbit on a launch vehicle that is mostly paid for—and with the date and time of launch and the orbital trajectory determined—by the entity that contracts and pays for the primary launch. As a result, the secondary payload typically obtains a substantially reduced price for transportation services to orbit, by accepting a trade off of the loss of control once the contract is signed and the payload is delivered to the launch vehicle supplier for integration to the launch vehicle. These tradeoffs typically include having little or no control over the launch date/time, the final orbital parameters, or the ability to halt the launch and remove the payload should a payload failure occur during ground processing prior to launch, as the primary payload typically purchases all of these launch property rights via contract with the launch services provider.

== Market ==
While originally a US government-centric option for government-owned launches—where secondary payload slots were often given away by whatever allocation means a government agency might choose—an entire market has emerged over time to take advantage of the lower cost of access to space through secondary payload opportunities.

The small satellite segment of the satellite launch industry has been growing rapidly in recent years. Development activity has been particularly high in the 1–50 kg size range. In the 1–50 kg range alone, there were fewer than 15 satellites launched annually in 2000 to 2005, 34 in 2006, then fewer than 30 launches annually during 2007 to 2011. This rose to 34 launched in 2012, and 92 small satellites launched in 2013. In 2023, 2,304 small satellites were launched, an 18% increase from 2022

=== United Launch Alliance ===
Offering of secondary launch services vary by launch provider. US commercial launcher United Launch Alliance (ULA) offers virtually no access for secondary payloads commercially, although the US military offers some secondary payload slots on ULA launchers Atlas V and Delta IV, that are then controlled by government launch slot allocation processes.

=== Rocket Lab ===
Rocket Lab offers rideshare capabilities in their existing Electron rocket. With the ability of the Kick Stage's ability to reignite, the vehicle can alternate between various orbits to deploy the various payloads.

The Photon is a satellite bus designed by Rocket Lab that is a major enhancement to the Kick Stage. It is able to launch multiple satellites to low Earth orbit (LEO), medium Earth orbit (MEO), geostationary orbit (GEO), lunar, and planetary destinations.

=== SpaceX ===
SpaceX offered a priced set of secondary payload launches on their Falcon 9 rocket beginning in 2011 with prices between US$200,000–325,000 for secondary payloads delivered to low Earth orbit (LEO). As of March 2014 SpaceX indicated that they would continue to launch some secondary payloads, but would not be doing a lot of them, as there was "still not a lot of money in the secondary payload market".

In early August 2019, SpaceX announced a rideshare program for launching small satellites into orbit when their large satellite market was shrinking after 2018. Although SpaceX had previously flown a dedicated secondary payload mission, the program would make customers buy ports directly from SpaceX. Initially SpaceX offered to launch secondary payloads up to 150 kg (330 lb) to a Sun-synchronous orbit for US$2.25 million if customers signed up at least 12 months before the launch. If between 6 and 12 months, prices would be increased to US$3 million. For secondary payloads up to 300 kg (660 lb) if customers signed up 12 months in advance SpaceX offered a base price of US$4.5 million and if 6 months in advance US$6 million. Flights were planned to be launched from SLC-4E at Vandenberg Air Force Base, starting from November 2020 on the Falcon 9 rocket.

However, following the response to the early August announcement; later in the month SpaceX revised plans, reducing prices such that payloads of up to 200 kg (440 lb) for US$1 million. In addition SpaceX announced more launch opportunities initially slated to start from March 2020. They would include secondary payloads on Starlink missions and others. The maiden flight of this program took place on June 13, 2020, when Starlink 8 was flown with 3 SkySats manufactured by Planet Labs.

Customers have the option of 15-or-24-inch-diameter (38 or 61 cm) ESPA ports. For dedicated rideshare missions 15-inch and 24-inch diameter rings will have 6 or 4 ports respectively. On Starlink launches, secondary payloads are mounted on the top of the Starlink stack. The mechanical interface for these launches will have two 15-inch-diameter ESPA ports or a single 24-inch-diameter ESPA ports. For these missions, SpaceX has removed a few satellites from their usual 60-satellite configuration. SpaceX also offers custom configuration when requested by the customer.

=== Arianespace ===
==== Vega ====
Arianespace launched the first dedicated rideshare mission on the Vega rocket during VV16, which launched 53 satellites into a Sun-synchronous orbit in September 2023. The flight was part of the Small Spacecraft Mission Service.

==== Ariane 6 ====
In August 2019 Arianespace announced rideshare missions directly into geostationary orbit in response to the rise of small satellites needing to be in that orbit. Customers will be able to buy flights up to 6 – 12 months before the launch. Injecting payloads directly into geostationary orbit allows customers not have to raise their spacecraft's orbits after being dropped of into geostationary transfer orbit. The payload will be deployed six hours after the launch. The first launch called, "GO-1" is expected to fly in Q1 or Q2 of 2022 on the Ariane 6 rocket (64 configuration). The launch will be from Guiana Space Centre. Similar flights may fly in an annual basis. Unlike tradition rideshare missions customers do not have to wait on a primary payload to be ready to launch, instead waiting for a payload capacity to be met.

=== Other ===
International Launch Services (ILS), a US company that markets launches of the Russian Proton rocket, does not and has no plans to launch commercial secondary payloads of smallsats or CubeSats. Sea Launch, a US-based consortium of US company Boeing and Russian company RSC Energia (RSCE) (now majority owned by RSCE), also does not currently launch commercial secondary payloads.

== Standardized payload interface offerings ==
=== ESPA ===
The EELV Secondary Payload Adapter (ESPA) is an interstage adapter ring that was originally designed for launching secondary payloads on space missions of the United States Department of Defense that use the Atlas V and Delta IV. First used in the 2000s, the goal of ESPA was to reduce launch costs for the primary customer and enable secondary and even tertiary missions with minimal impact to the primary mission. The ESPA ring design has become a de facto standard, and is now much more widely used than the original intent and rockets.

ESPA was designed to support up to a 6,800 kilograms (15,000 lb) primary payload and up to six secondary payloads of no more than 180 kilograms (400 lb) each. Each secondary spacecraft is mounted radially on a 38 centimetres (15 in) diameter port and is allocated 61 cm (24 in) x 71 cm (28 in) x 97 cm (38 in) volume.

By 2011, SpaceX was contracting for secondary payloads to be launched on their Falcon 9 rocket using a standard ESPA ring interface.

=== SSPS ===
Commercial derivatives of the ESPA Grande ring are being developed. Named the Spaceflight Secondary Payload System (SSPS), the system is being developed and manufactured by Andrews Space under contract to Spaceflight Services. It includes five 61 cm (24 in)-diameter ports, each capable of carrying payloads weighing up 300 kilograms (660 lb). "The SSPS operates very similar to a standalone spacecraft with a flight computer, electrical power system, orbit determination capability, and payload power switching."
