= Mini-Mag Orion =

Nuclear Pulse Propulsion

- Country of origin: United States
- Date: 2000
- Manufacturer: Andrews Space

Solid-fuel motor

Performance
- Thrust-to-weight ratio: 0.2-10

Mini-Mag Orion (MMO), or Miniature Magnetic Orion, is a proposed type of spacecraft propulsion based on the Project Orion nuclear propulsion system. The Mini-Mag Orion system achieves propulsion by compressing fissile material in a magnetic field, a Z-pinch, until fission occurs. This fission reaction propels the craft. MMO should be able to propel 100 tons to Mars within 3 months or to Jupiter in about one year.

== History ==
In June 2000, Andrews Space concluded a Phase I NASA Small Business Innovation Research project on an iteration of the original Project Orion concept termed MagOrion. MagOrion introduced the use of a large, 2 km diameter, superconducting ring to interact with the plasma debris of the nuclear explosive pulses; replacing the mechanically dampened pusher plate of the original Project Orion concept. This enabled specific impulses above 10,000 seconds with initial system Thrust to Weight ratios from 0.2 to 10. The study also identified several potential show-stoppers for MagOrion; the brittleness of superconductors and their susceptibility to critical self-field limitations, the technical challenge of constructing a 2 km diameter superconductor in space as well as the political difficulty of launching a device capable of ejecting nuclear explosives at high repetition rates. These concerns led to the next iteration in the Orion family of designs, Mini-MagOrion (MMO), which are discussed here. The MMO program was funded jointly by NASA and the US Department of Energy (DOE)

== Concept ==
The Mini-MagOrion (MMO) concept attempts to address the identified short-comings of the MagOrion concept. The MMO design adds two important aspects to the family of Orion concepts. First, the use of magnetic compression of the fissile targets enables the utilization of much smaller explosions, 50-500 GJ yield vs. 20,000 GJ, which are triggered by an external device and thus cannot be projected as a potential weapon. Second, using smaller yield explosions allowed for the replacement of the large superconducting ring with a more sophisticated assembly of several coils arranged into a nozzle like configuration.

== Testing ==
Andrews Space worked together with the US Sandia National Laboratories to conduct several experiments that demonstrated key components of the MMO design. The first experiment, conducted on the SNL Saturn machine, showed that mylar, in the form of plastic foil, could be used as a conductor to direct the current into the fuel pellet which would then set up the imploding magnetic field to compress it.

The second test was conducted on the SNL Z-Machine, the world's most powerful x-ray emitter and z-pinch at that time. The experiment was intended to measure the relationship between the applied power pulse and the resulting compression ratio of the target. The experiments did not use fissile material, but a number of inert heavy elements, gold, tungsten, etc., to avoid contamination of the facility. The results were inconclusive due to challenges with the measurement equipment used to determine the compression ratio.

== Media ==
The July 2003 issue of Aerospace Engineering, published by SAE Aerospace, had a brief article about the Mini-MagOrion program and the pulse power experiments at Sandia National Laboratories. Due to its close relationship to the original Project Orion, the MMO concept continues to be discussed throughout the blogosphere.
