= GotVoice =

American visual voicemail company

- Industry: Telecommunications
- Founded: 2003
- Founder: Martin Dunsmuir
- Headquarters: Kirkland, Washington
- Key people: Curt Blake (CEO)
- Website: www.gotvoice.com

GotVoice is an American visual voicemail company founded in 2003 by former RealNetworks and Microsoft executive Martin Dunsmuir. In 2006, the service began to convert voicemails into mp3's and deliver them via e-mail. In 2007, GotVoice also introduced voicemail to text services in which voicemails are delivered via SMS text messages for mobile, home, office and Internet phones.

Today the company's CEO is Curt Blake and the company is based in Kirkland, Washington.

On January 31, 2011, GotVoice discontinued service for all consumer accounts. The product is now exclusively available to large-scale customers with a minimum of 5,000 users.
