= Andrews Space =

American Aerospace Company

Coordinates: 47.498445°N 122.289916°W

Andrews Space was founded in 1999 by Jason Andrews and Marian Joh to be a catalyst in the commercialization, exploration and development of space. Originally named Andrews Space & Technology, the company shortened its name in 2003 to Andrews Space. Over its life the company developed many unique technologies and space transportation architectures for the US Government (NASA, DARPA, others) and commercial customers. The company is now Spaceflight Systems, a subsidiary of Spaceflight Industries, Inc.

== Projects and products ==
Andrews Space developed a number of innovative technologies and space transportation concepts including:

- Mini-mag Orion
- Alchemist Air Collection and Enrichment System
- Gryphon fully reusable horizontal take / horizontal landing space plane
- Peregrine small launch system
- SHERPA space tug
- Cubesat/Nanosat recovery system

Andrews Space worked for most branches of the US Government. Noteworthy efforts include:

- NASA Space Launch Initiative
- NASA Space Transportation Architecture Study
- NASA Commercial Cargo Logistics
- DARPA FALCON Small Launch Vehicle
- DARPA FALCON Common Aero Vehicle
- DARPA / USAF Reusable Booster System
- NASA Altair Lunar Lander
- NASA Heavy Lift Launch Vehicle
- US Army Kestrel Eye Program

From 2008 to 2012 Andrews Space developed a series of cubesat and nanosat subsystems and components including the CORTEX avionics suite, a lithium-ion battery, solar arrays and numerous spacecraft subsystems:

- As of November 2012, Andrews manufacturers a line of magnetorquers used to provide attitude control for small spacecraft of between 30 and 180 kilograms (66 and 397 lb) in mass.
- Andrews Space developed and produced the Cargo Module Power Unit for the Orbital Cygnus spacecraft.

== History ==
Andrews Space was founded in 1999 by Jason Andrews and Marian Joh to be a catalyst in the commercialization, exploration and development of space. Originally named Andrews Space & Technology, the company shortened its name in 2003 to Andrews Space. Over its life the company developed many unique technologies and space transportation architectures for the US Government (NASA, DARPA, others) and commercial customers. These include the Gryphon horizontal takeoff horizontal landing system using the "Alchemist" Air Collection and Enrichment System (ACES) as part of the NASA Space Launch Initiative. The Peregrine small launch vehicle was developed as part of the DARPA FALCON program and used a reusable first stage with expendable solid motor upper stages. In 2003 Andrews Space was one of four companies selected by NASA to study commercial cargo logistics to the International Space Station. This later lead to the NASA COTS (Commercial Orbital Transportation System) program to fly cargo to the ISS commercially. Andrews Space was chosen in 2006 as one of six finalists for NASA's Commercial Orbital Transportation Services (COTS) program, though they were not subsequently selected for funding the COTS R&D by NASA. Andrews Space later supported Rocketplane Kistler's COTS effort. In 2010 and 2011 Andrews Space support Orbital's Cygnus COTS effort.

In November 2010, Andrews Space was selected by NASA for consideration for potential contract awards for heavy lift launch vehicle system concepts, and propulsion technologies. In 2011 Andrews Space was one of four companies selected by the US Air Force as part of its Rocket-back Booster System demonstrator program. As part of these awards the company was awarded a $250M IDIQ contract.

In 2013 Andrews Space was awarded a contract by the US Army SMDC to build the Kestrel Eye 2 small imaging spacecraft. This was the result of a pivot by Andrews Space, begun in 2008, to move into space hardware production and very small spacecraft. While the Kestrel Eye 2 program was delayed and ultimately cancelled due to funding cuts as a result of Sequestration, much of the technology would make it to orbit as part of the BlackSky Pathfinder spacecraft, which was launched successfully in September 2016.

From 2011 to 2013 Andrews Space developed and built the Cargo Module Power Unit for Orbital's Cygnus cargo delivery spacecraft. The CMPU was responsible for supplying power and managing power distribution to powered experiments inside the Cygnus spacecraft during their trip to the ISS. Andrews Space also licensed the magnetic torque rod design from Sinclair Interplanetary and produced many units which were used in a range of spacecraft, including those for the BlackSky Pathfinder / Global spacecraft, the Skybox Skysat spacecraft, as well as others.

In 2015 Andrews Space was merged with Spaceflight, Inc. and BlackSky Global LLC and operated as Spaceflight Systems, a separate operating entity under the parent company of Spaceflight Industries.

== See also ==
- Reusable launch system
- Commercial Orbital Transportation Services
- List of private spaceflight companies
