= List of Falcon 9 and Falcon Heavy launches (2023) =

Left to right: Falcon 9 v1.0, v1.1, v1.2 "Full Thrust", Falcon 9 Block 5, Falcon Heavy, and Falcon Heavy Block 5.

In 2023, SpaceX launched 96 Falcon family vehicles—91 Falcon 9 and five Falcon Heavy rockets. It surpassed both the company's own single-year launch record of 61 and the global annual record of 64 launches, coming close to its previously announced goal of 100 Falcon launches in the year.

The company's payload delivery capacity also rose, with approximately 1,200 tonnes (2,600,000 lb) sent to orbit.

== Statistics ==
=== Rocket configurations ===
- Falcon 9 Block 5
- Falcon 9 Block 5 (reused)
- Falcon Heavy

=== Launch sites ===
- Cape Canaveral, SLC-40
- Kennedy, LC-39A
- Vandenberg, SLC-4E

=== Launch outcomes ===
- Success (commercial and government)
- Success (Starlink)

=== Booster landings ===
- Drone-ship failure
- Ground-pad success
- Drone-ship success
- No attempt

== Launches ==
=== January ===
Flight No.	Date and time (UTC)	Version, booster (Note: Falcon 9 first-stage boosters have a four-digit serial number. A decimal point followed by a number indicates the flight count. For example, B1021.1 and B1021.2 represent the first and second flights of booster B1021. Boosters without a decimal point were expended on their first flight. Additionally, missions where boosters are making their first flight are shown with a mint-colored background.)	Launch site	Payload (Note: Dragon spacecraft have a three-digit serial number. A decimal point followed by a number indicates the flight count. For example, C106.1 and C106.2 represent the first and second flights of Dragon C106.)	Payload mass	Orbit	Customer	Launch outcome	Booster landing
195	3 January 2023; 14:56	F9 B5; B1060‑15	Cape Canaveral, SLC‑40	Transporter-6 (115 payload smallsat rideshare)	Unknown (Note: Many Transporter and Bandwagon payloads are not public, or don't have a publicly revealed mass. SpaceX has not published a payload mass estimate for this mission.)	SSO	Various	Success	Success (LZ‑1)
195	Dedicated SmallSat Rideshare mission to Sun-synchronous orbit. It included six space tugs, also known as orbital transfer vehicles (OTV), which are two of D-Orbit's ION Satellite Carriers, Epic Aerospace's Chimera LEO 1, Momentus's Vigoride-5, Skykraft's OTV and Launcher's Orbiter SN1. Orbiter SN1 failed shortly after deployment from Falcon and before deploying payloads. One of the payloads, EWS RROCI failed to deploy from Falcon 9 and the satellite re-entered with the upper stage. This was not a SpaceX failure as brokered dispensers and deployers are used on Transporter missions.								
196	10 January 2023; 04:50	F9 B5; B1076‑2	Cape Canaveral, SLC‑40	OneWeb 16 (40 satellites)	6,000 kg (13,000 lb)	Polar LEO	OneWeb	Success	Success (LZ‑1)
196	Following the Russian invasion of Ukraine, OneWeb suspended launches on Soyuz rockets. In March 2022, OneWeb announced that they had signed an agreement with SpaceX to resume satellite launches. This flight, the 16th of the OneWeb program and the second on a SpaceX rocket, carried 40 satellites.								
FH 5	15 January 2023; 22:56	Falcon Heavy B5; B1070 (core)	Kennedy, LC‑39A	USSF-67 (CBAS-2 & LDPE-3A)	~3,750 kg (8,270 lb)	GEO	USSF	Success	No attempt
FH 5	15 January 2023; 22:56	B1064‑2 (side)	Kennedy, LC‑39A	USSF-67 (CBAS-2 & LDPE-3A)	~3,750 kg (8,270 lb)	GEO	USSF	Success	Success (LZ‑2)
FH 5	15 January 2023; 22:56	B1065‑2 (side)	Kennedy, LC‑39A	USSF-67 (CBAS-2 & LDPE-3A)	~3,750 kg (8,270 lb)	GEO	USSF	Success	Success (LZ‑1)
FH 5	First launch of Phase 2 US Air Force contract. US$316 million cost for the fiscal year of 2022, for the first flight, mostly includes the cost of an extended payload fairing, upgrades to the company's West Coast launch pad at Vandenberg Space Force Base in California, and a vertical integration facility required for NRO missions, while the launching price does not increase. SpaceX deliberately expended the center core, which thus lacked grid fins and landing gear, while the two side-boosters were recovered at Landing Zones 1 and 2, and it was the fourth second stage featuring Falcon long coast mission-extension kit as the mission requirements are same as the USSF-44 mission.								
197	18 January 2023; 12:24	F9 B5; B1077‑2	Cape Canaveral, SLC‑40	USA-343 (GPS-III SV06)	4,352 kg (9,595 lb)	MEO	USSF	Success	Success (ASOG)
197	Global Positioning System navigation satellite, sixth GPS Block III satellite to be launched, named after Amelia Earhart. Space vehicle manufacturing contract awarded February 2013. In September 2018, the space vehicle was integrating harnesses. In March 2018, the Air Force announced it had awarded the launch contract for three GPS satellites to SpaceX.								
198	19 January 2023; 15:43	F9 B5; B1075‑1	Vandenberg, SLC‑4E	Starlink: Group 2-4 (51 satellites)	15,000 kg (33,000 lb)	LEO	SpaceX	Success	Success (OCISLY)
198	Launch of 51 Starlink v1.5 satellites to a 570 km (350 mi) orbit at an inclination of 70° to expand internet constellation.								
199	26 January 2023; 09:32	F9 B5; B1067‑9	Cape Canaveral, SLC‑40	Starlink: Group 5-2 (56 satellites)	~17,400 kg (38,400 lb)	LEO	SpaceX	Success	Success (JRTI)
199	Launch of 56 Starlink v1.5 satellites to a 530 km (330 mi) orbit at an inclination of 43° to expand internet constellation. This was the heaviest payload to date flown on Falcon 9.								
200	31 January 2023; 16:15	F9 B5; B1071‑7	Vandenberg, SLC‑4E	Starlink: Group 2-6 (49 satellites)	~15,200 kg (33,500 lb)	LEO	SpaceX	Success	Success (OCISLY)
200	31 January 2023; 16:15	F9 B5; B1071‑7	Vandenberg, SLC‑4E	ION SCV009	~15,200 kg (33,500 lb)	LEO	D-Orbit	Success	Success (OCISLY)
200	Launch of 49 Starlink v1.5 satellites to a 570 km (350 mi) orbit at an inclination of 70° to expand internet constellation. Also carried D-Orbit's ION SCV009 "Eclectic Elena."								

=== February ===
Flight No.	Date and time (UTC)	Version, booster	Launch site	Payload	Payload mass	Orbit	Customer	Launch outcome	Booster landing
201	2 February 2023; 07:58	F9 B5; B1069‑5	Kennedy, LC‑39A	Starlink: Group 5-3 (53 satellites)	16,500 kg (36,400 lb)	LEO	SpaceX	Success	Success (ASOG)
201	Launch of 53 Starlink v1.5 satellites to a 530 km (330 mi) orbit at an inclination of 43° to expand internet constellation.								
202	7 February 2023; 01:32	F9 B5; B1073‑6	Cape Canaveral, SLC‑40	Amazonas Nexus	4,146 kg (9,140 lb)	GTO	Hispasat	Success	Success (JRTI)
202	A high-throughput telecommunications satellite. Hosted payloads included USSF Pathfinder 2 and Tele Greenland A/S's GreenSat.								
203	12 February 2023; 05:10	F9 B5; B1062‑12	Cape Canaveral, SLC‑40	Starlink: Group 5-4 (55 satellites)	17,100 kg (37,700 lb)	LEO	SpaceX	Success	Success (ASOG)
203	Launch of 55 Starlink v1.5 satellites to a 530 km (330 mi) orbit at an inclination of 43° to expand internet constellation. A fairing half on this mission was flown and recovered for a record 8th time. This launch marked a new pad turnaround record for SpaceX, launching 5 days, 3 hours and 38 minutes after the previous mission from SLC-40.								
204	17 February 2023; 19:12	F9 B5; B1063‑9	Vandenberg, SLC‑4E	Starlink: Group 2-5 (51 satellites)	15,900 kg (35,100 lb)	LEO	SpaceX	Success	Success (OCISLY)
204	Launch of 51 Starlink v1.5 satellites to a 570 km (350 mi) orbit at an inclination of 70° to expand internet constellation.								
205	18 February 2023; 03:59	F9 B5; B1077‑3	Cape Canaveral, SLC‑40	Inmarsat-6 F2	5,470 kg (12,060 lb)	GTO	Inmarsat	Success	Success (JRTI)
205	Inmarsat maintained its launch option after a scheduled 2016 Falcon Heavy launch (a European Aviation Network satellite) was switched for an Ariane 5 launch in 2017. This option could be used for launching Inmarsat-6B. In February 2022, Inmarsat confirmed Inmarsat-6 F2 will launch on a Falcon 9 rocket. The satellite reached the supersynchronous geostationary transfer orbit of 387 km × 41,592 km (240 mi × 25,844 mi) inclined at 27°.								
206	27 February 2023; 23:13	F9 B5; B1076‑3	Cape Canaveral, SLC‑40	Starlink: Group 6-1 (21 satellites)	~15,300 kg (33,700 lb)	LEO	SpaceX	Success	Success (ASOG)
206	Launch of 21 Starlink v2 mini satellites to a 530 km (330 mi) orbit at an inclination of 43° to expand internet constellation. This mission marked the debut of the v2 mini satellites, a smaller version of the planned v2 satellites, which are to launch on the future Starship. The v2 mini is 2.4 times the mass of its v1.5 predecessor but provides four times the data capacity. Unlike the v1.5, the tension rods that hold the v2 mini satellites together during launch, remain attached to the Falcon 9 second stage after deployment, reducing orbital debris. This flight marked the 100th consecutive landing success of a Falcon 9 booster since February 16, 2021.								

=== March ===
Flight No.	Date and time (UTC)	Version, booster	Launch site	Payload	Payload mass	Orbit	Customer	Launch outcome	Booster landing
207	2 March 2023; 05:34	F9 B5; B1078‑1	Kennedy, LC‑39A	Crew-6 (Crew Dragon C206.4 Endeavour)	~13,000 kg (29,000 lb)	LEO (ISS)	NASA (CTS)	Success	Success (JRTI)
207	Last USCV launch out of original NASA award of six Crew Dragon missions, to carry up to four astronauts and 100 kg (220 lb) of cargo to the ISS, as well as feature a lifeboat function to evacuate astronauts from ISS in case of an emergency.								
208	3 March 2023; 18:38	F9 B5; B1061‑12	Vandenberg, SLC‑4E	Starlink: Group 2-7 (51 satellites)	15,900 kg (35,100 lb)	LEO	SpaceX	Success	Success (OCISLY)
208	Launch of 51 Starlink v1.5 satellites to a 570 km (350 mi) orbit at an inclination of 70° to expand internet constellation.								
209	9 March 2023; 19:13	F9 B5; B1062‑13	Cape Canaveral, SLC‑40	OneWeb 17 (40 satellites)	6,000 kg (13,000 lb)	LEO	OneWeb	Success	Success (LZ‑1)
209	Following the Russian invasion of Ukraine, OneWeb suspended launches on Soyuz rockets. In March 2022, OneWeb announced they had signed an agreement with SpaceX to resume satellite launches.								
210	15 March 2023; 00:30	F9 B5; B1073‑7	Kennedy, LC‑39A	SpaceX CRS-27 (Dragon C209.3)	2,852 kg (6,288 lb)	LEO (ISS)	NASA (CRS)	Success	Success (ASOG)
210	Three more CRS Phase 2 missions for Dragon 2 covering up to CRS-29 were announced in December 2020. This flight used a partial boostback burn to bring the first-stage booster to its drone ship closer to the coast. The maneuver was meant to cut down processing time by decreasing the time spent moving the ship back for refurbishment.								
211	17 March 2023; 19:26	F9 B5; B1071‑8	Vandenberg, SLC‑4E	Starlink: Group 2-8 (52 satellites)	~16,200 kg (35,700 lb)	LEO	SpaceX	Success	Success (OCISLY)
211	Launch of 52 Starlink v1.5 satellites to a 570 km (350 mi) orbit at an inclination of 70° to expand internet constellation.								
212	17 March 2023; 23:38	F9 B5; B1069‑6	Cape Canaveral, SLC‑40	SES-18 & SES-19	~7,000 kg (15,000 lb)	GTO	SES	Success	Success (JRTI)
212	SpaceX launched two C-band satellites for SES, with the option to launch a third satellite on a second flight. SpaceX set a new record for the shortest time between two Falcon 9 launches at 4 hours and 12 minutes. The previous record time was 7 hours and 10 minutes, set between the Crew-5 and Starlink Group 4-29 missions on October 5, 2022.								
213	24 March 2023; 15:43	F9 B5; B1067‑10	Cape Canaveral, SLC‑40	Starlink: Group 5-5 (56 satellites)	~17,400 kg (38,400 lb)	LEO	SpaceX	Success	Success (ASOG)
213	Launch of 56 Starlink v1.5 satellites to a 530 km (330 mi) orbit at an inclination of 43° to expand internet constellation.								
214	29 March 2023; 20:01	F9 B5; B1077‑4	Cape Canaveral, SLC‑40	Starlink: Group 5-10 (56 satellites)	~17,400 kg (38,400 lb)	LEO	SpaceX	Success	Success (JRTI)
214	Launch of 56 Starlink v1.5 satellites to a 530 km (330 mi) orbit at an inclination of 43° to expand internet constellation. This launch marked the first time SpaceX completed eight launches in a calendar month.								

=== April ===
Flight No.	Date and time (UTC)	Version, booster	Launch site	Payload	Payload mass	Orbit	Customer	Launch outcome	Booster landing
215	2 April 2023; 14:29	F9 B5; B1075‑2	Vandenberg, SLC‑4E	SDA Tranche 0A (10 satellites)	Unknown	LEO	SDA	Success	Success (LZ‑4)
215	First launch of SDA Transport and Tracking Layer satellites. Out of 10 satellites, 8 are York Space Systems built Transport layer satellites and 2 are SpaceX-Leidos built, Starlink-derived Tracking Layer satellites. The Transport layer is an interoperable mesh network of satellites intended to provide periodic low-latency and high-capacity data connectivity, while the Tracking Layer consists of interconnected satellites with cross-links and wide field of view infrared sensors for hypersonic missile tracking.								
216	7 April 2023; 04:30	F9 B5; B1076‑4	Cape Canaveral, SLC‑40	Intelsat 40e	~5,588 kg (12,319 lb)	GTO	Intelsat	Success	Success (ASOG)
216	Maxar Technologies-built satellite to service North and Central America. Also hosts the Tropospheric Emissions: Monitoring of Pollution (TEMPO) experiment.								
217	15 April 2023; 06:47	F9 B5; B1063‑10	Vandenberg, SLC‑4E	Transporter-7 (51 payload smallsat rideshare)	Unknown	SSO	Various	Success	Success (LZ‑4)
217	Dedicated SmallSat Rideshare mission to sun-synchronous orbit. First flight with short nozzle second stage aimed at lowering costs and improving launch cadence, but is only suitable for missions with lower performance requirements. Fifth mission featuring a second stage with a long coast mission-extension kit, accommodating the four second stage burns for payload deployment, excluding the deorbit burn.								
218	19 April 2023; 14:31	F9 B5; B1073‑8	Cape Canaveral, SLC‑40	Starlink: Group 6-2 (21 satellites)	~15,300 kg (33,700 lb)	LEO	SpaceX	Success	Success (ASOG)
218	Launch of 21 Starlink v2 mini satellites to a 530 km (330 mi) orbit at an inclination of 43° to expand internet constellation.								
219	27 April 2023; 13:40	F9 B5; B1061‑13	Vandenberg, SLC‑4E	Starlink: Group 3-5 (46 satellites)	~14,100 kg (31,100 lb)	SSO	SpaceX	Success	Success (OCISLY)
219	Launch of 46 Starlink v1.5 satellites to a 560 km (350 mi) sun-synchronous orbit at an inclination of 97.6° to expand internet constellation.								
220	28 April 2023; 22:12	F9 B5; B1078‑2	Cape Canaveral, SLC‑40	O3b mPOWER 3 & 4	~4,100 kg (9,000 lb)	MEO	SES	Success	Success (JRTI)
220	Second part of SES' MEO satellites for its O3b low-latency, high-performance connectivity services.								

=== May ===
Flight No.	Date and time (UTC)	Version, booster	Launch site	Payload	Payload mass	Orbit	Customer	Launch outcome	Booster landing
FH 6	1 May 2023; 00:26	Falcon Heavy B5; B1068 (core)	Kennedy, LC‑39A	ViaSat-3 Americas	6,400 kg (14,100 lb)	GEO	ViaSat	Success	No attempt
FH 6	1 May 2023; 00:26	B1052-8 (side)	Kennedy, LC‑39A	Aurora 4A (Arcturus)	300 kg (660 lb)	GEO	Astranis / Pacific Dataport	Success	No attempt
FH 6	1 May 2023; 00:26	B1053-3 (side)	Kennedy, LC‑39A	GS-1	22 kg (49 lb)	GEO	Gravity Space	Success	No attempt
FH 6	This mission directly delivered the satellites to geostationary orbit, thus the core and side boosters were all expendable alongside having the sixth second stage featuring Falcon long coast mission-extension kit. Satellites of the ViaSat-3 class use electric propulsion, which requires less fuel for stationkeeping operations over their lifetime, making them the heaviest all-electric satellites ever launched into space. First mission to expend all three cores. GS-1 is a cubesat operated by Gravity Space on behalf of PT Pasifik Satelit Nusantara who calls the satellite Nusantara-H1-A.								
221	4 May 2023; 07:31	F9 B5; B1069‑7	Cape Canaveral, SLC‑40	Starlink: Group 5-6 (56 satellites)	~17,400 kg (38,400 lb)	LEO	SpaceX	Success	Success (ASOG)
221	Launch of 56 Starlink v1.5 satellites to a 530 km (330 mi) orbit at an inclination of 43° to expand internet constellation. A fairing half on this mission was flown and recovered for a record 9th time.								
222	10 May 2023; 20:09	F9 B5; B1075‑3	Vandenberg, SLC‑4E	Starlink: Group 2-9 (51 satellites)	15,900 kg (35,100 lb)	LEO	SpaceX	Success	Success (OCISLY)
222	Launch of 51 Starlink v1.5 satellites to a 570 km (350 mi) orbit at an inclination of 70° to expand internet constellation.								
223	14 May 2023; 05:03	F9 B5; B1067‑11	Cape Canaveral, SLC‑40	Starlink: Group 5-9 (56 satellites)	~17,400 kg (38,400 lb)	LEO	SpaceX	Success	Success (JRTI)
223	Launch of 56 Starlink v1.5 satellites to a 530 km (330 mi) orbit at an inclination of 43° to expand internet constellation.								
224	19 May 2023; 06:19	F9 B5; B1076‑5	Cape Canaveral, SLC‑40	Starlink: Group 6-3 (22 satellites)	~16,100 kg (35,500 lb)	LEO	SpaceX	Success	Success (ASOG)
224	Launch of 22 Starlink v2 mini satellites to a 530 km (330 mi) orbit at an inclination of 43° to expand internet constellation.								
225	20 May 2023; 13:16	F9 B5; B1063‑11	Vandenberg, SLC‑4E	Iridium-NEXT (5 satellites); OneWeb (15 Gen1 plus a Gen2 test satellite)	~6,600 kg (14,600 lb)	Polar LEO	Iridium & OneWeb	Success	Success (OCISLY)
225	Iridium-9 rideshare mission, carrying five on-orbit spare Iridium-NEXT satellites along with 15 Gen1 and a demo Gen2 OneWeb satellites. Second flight with short nozzle second stage aimed at lowering costs and improving launch cadence, but is only suitable for missions with lower performance requirements.								
226	21 May 2023; 21:37	F9 B5; B1080‑1	Kennedy, LC‑39A	Ax-2 (Crew Dragon C212.2 Freedom)	~13,000 kg (29,000 lb)	LEO (ISS)	Axiom Space	Success	Success (LZ‑1)
226	Axiom contracted for three additional private crewed missions in June 2021. Peggy Whitson and John Shoffner were signed on as commander and pilot for Ax-2. The third and fourth seats were bought by Saudi Arabia. The Saudi crew members were revealed to be Ali AlQarni and Rayyanah Barnawi. First time a booster landed on a ground pad after a crewed launch.								
227	27 May 2023; 04:30	F9 B5; B1062‑14	Cape Canaveral, SLC‑40	ArabSat 7B (Badr-8)	~4,500 kg (9,900 lb)	GTO	Arabsat	Success	Success (JRTI)
227	Includes Airbus's TELEO optical communications payload demonstrator.								
228	31 May 2023; 06:02	F9 B5; B1061‑14	Vandenberg, SLC‑4E	Starlink: Group 2-10 (52 satellites)	~16,400 kg (36,200 lb)	LEO	SpaceX	Success	Success (OCISLY)
228	Launch of 52 Starlink v1.5 satellites to a 570 km (350 mi) orbit at an inclination of 70° to expand internet constellation. The 200th consecutive successful Falcon 9 mission. This launch marked the first time SpaceX completed nine launches in a calendar month.								

=== June ===
Flight No.	Date and time (UTC)	Version, booster	Launch site	Payload	Payload mass	Orbit	Customer	Launch outcome	Booster landing
229	4 June 2023; 12:20	F9 B5; B1078‑3	Cape Canaveral, SLC‑40	Starlink: Group 6-4 (22 satellites)	~16,100 kg (35,500 lb)	LEO	SpaceX	Success	Success (JRTI)
229	Launch of 22 Starlink v2 mini satellites to a 530 km (330 mi) orbit at an inclination of 43° to expand internet constellation.								
230	5 June 2023; 15:47	F9 B5; B1077‑5	Kennedy, LC‑39A	SpaceX CRS-28 (Dragon C208.4)	~3,304 kg (7,284 lb)	LEO (ISS)	NASA (CRS)	Success	Success (ASOG)
230	Three more CRS Phase 2 missions for Dragon 2 covering up to CRS-29 were announced in December 2020. Third flight with short nozzle second stage aimed at lowering costs and improving launch cadence, but is only suitable for missions with lower performance requirements.								
231	12 June 2023; 07:10	F9 B5; B1073‑9	Cape Canaveral, SLC‑40	Starlink: Group 5-11 (52 satellites)	~16,400 kg (36,200 lb)	LEO	SpaceX	Success	Success (JRTI)
231	Launch of 52 Starlink v1.5 satellites to a 530 km (330 mi) orbit at an inclination of 43° to expand internet constellation.								
232	12 June 2023; 21:35	F9 B5; B1071‑9	Vandenberg, SLC‑4E	Transporter-8 (72 payload smallsat rideshare)	Unknown	SSO	Various	Success	Success (LZ‑4)
232	Dedicated SmallSat Rideshare mission to Sun-synchronous orbit. Launcher's Orbiter SN3 vehicle and the first Satellite Vu Mid-wave Infrared imaging satellite are expected to fly on this mission. This mission marked the 200th overall successful booster landing. Fourth flight with short nozzle second stage aimed at lowering costs and improving launch cadence, but is only suitable for missions with lower performance requirements.								
233	18 June 2023; 22:21	F9 B5; B1067‑12	Cape Canaveral, SLC‑40	SATRIA	~4,580 kg (10,100 lb)	GTO	PT Pasifik Satelit Nusantara	Success	Success (ASOG)
233	PSN selected Falcon 9 in September 2020, to launch its satellite instead of a Chinese rocket or Ariane 5.								
234	22 June 2023; 07:19	F9 B5; B1075‑4	Vandenberg, SLC‑4E	Starlink: Group 5-7 (47 satellites)	~14,500 kg (32,000 lb)	LEO	SpaceX	Success	Success (OCISLY)
234	Launch of 47 Starlink v1.5 satellites to a 530 km (330 mi) orbit at an inclination of 43° to expand internet constellation. This launch from Vandenberg achieved a record-breaking low orbital inclination of 43° for a rocket launched from the West Coast of the United States. Previous Starlink Group 9 launches to 43° had been conducted from the East Coast. Due to the unique orbital insertion, this launch carried nine fewer Starlink v1.5 satellites than a typical Group 9 launch, reducing weight by about 2,900 kg (6,400 lb).								
235	23 June 2023; 15:35	F9 B5; B1069‑8	Cape Canaveral, SLC‑40	Starlink: Group 5-12 (56 satellites)	~17,400 kg (38,400 lb)	LEO	SpaceX	Success	Success (JRTI)
235	Launch of 56 Starlink v1.5 satellites to a 530 km (330 mi) orbit at an inclination of 43° to expand internet constellation. A fairing half on this mission was flown and recovered for a record 10th time.								

=== July ===
Flight No.	Date and time (UTC)	Version, booster	Launch site	Payload	Payload mass	Orbit	Customer	Launch outcome	Booster landing
236	1 July 2023; 15:12	F9 B5; B1080‑2	Cape Canaveral, SLC‑40	Euclid	~2,160 kg (4,760 lb)	Sun–Earth L_{2} injection	ESA	Success	Success (ASOG)
236	Euclid is a space telescope to better understand dark energy and dark matter by accurately measuring the acceleration of the universe.								
237	7 July 2023; 19:29	F9 B5; B1063‑12	Vandenberg, SLC‑4E	Starlink: Group 5-13 (48 satellites)	~14,900 kg (32,800 lb)	LEO	SpaceX	Success	Success (OCISLY)
237	Launch of 48 Starlink v1.5 satellites to a 530 km (330 mi) orbit at an inclination of 43° to expand internet constellation. This launch was to a lower than normal orbital inclination for a West Coast launch, as launches to 43° are normally conducted from the East Coast. Due to the unique orbital insertion, this launch carried fewer Starlink satellites than a typical launch, reducing weight.								
238	10 July 2023; 03:58	F9 B5; B1058‑16	Cape Canaveral, SLC‑40	Starlink: Group 6-5 (22 satellites)	~16,100 kg (35,500 lb)	LEO	SpaceX	Success	Success (JRTI)
238	Launch of 22 Starlink v2 mini satellites to a 530 km (330 mi) orbit at an inclination of 43° to expand internet constellation. On this flight, B1058 became the booster to launch and land 16 times.								
239	16 July 2023; 03:50	F9 B5; B1060‑16	Cape Canaveral, SLC‑40	Starlink: Group 5-15 (54 satellites)	~16,700 kg (36,800 lb)	LEO	SpaceX	Success	Success (ASOG)
239	Launch of 54 Starlink v1.5 satellites to a 530 km (330 mi) orbit at an inclination of 43° to expand internet constellation. Final launch of Starlink v1.5 satellites. This launch marked the second time a booster was being launched for the 16th time.								
240	20 July 2023; 04:09	F9 B5; B1071‑10	Vandenberg, SLC‑4E	Starlink: Group 6-15 (15 satellites)	~12,000 kg (26,000 lb)	LEO	SpaceX	Success	Success (OCISLY)
240	Launch of 15 Starlink v2 mini satellites to a 530 km (330 mi) orbit at an inclination of 43° to expand internet constellation. First Starlink v2 mini launch from West Coast. This launch was to a lower than normal orbital inclination for a West Coast launch, as launches to 43° are normally conducted from the East Coast. Due to the unique orbital insertion, this launch carried fewer Starlink satellites than a typical launch, reducing weight.								
241	24 July 2023; 00:50	F9 B5; B1076‑6	Cape Canaveral, SLC‑40	Starlink: Group 6-6 (22 satellites)	~16,100 kg (35,500 lb)	LEO	SpaceX	Success	Success (JRTI)
241	Launch of 22 Starlink v2 mini satellites to a 530 km (330 mi) orbit at an inclination of 43° to expand internet constellation.								
242	28 July 2023; 04:01	F9 B5; B1062‑15	Cape Canaveral, SLC‑40	Starlink: Group 6-7 (22 satellites)	~16,100 kg (35,500 lb)	LEO	SpaceX	Success	Success (ASOG)
242	Launch of 22 Starlink v2 mini satellites to a 530 km (330 mi) orbit at an inclination of 43° to expand internet constellation. The launch occurred 4 days, 3 hours and 11 minutes after SpaceX's previous mission from the same pad, setting a new record that was broken again ten days later with flight 244.								
FH 7	29 July 2023; 03:04	Falcon Heavy B5; B1074 (core)	Kennedy, LC‑39A	Jupiter-3 (EchoStar-24)	~9,200 kg (20,300 lb)	GTO	EchoStar	Success	No attempt
FH 7	29 July 2023; 03:04	B1064‑3 (side)	Kennedy, LC‑39A	Jupiter-3 (EchoStar-24)	~9,200 kg (20,300 lb)	GTO	EchoStar	Success	Success (LZ‑1)
FH 7	29 July 2023; 03:04	B1065‑3 (side)	Kennedy, LC‑39A	Jupiter-3 (EchoStar-24)	~9,200 kg (20,300 lb)	GTO	EchoStar	Success	Success (LZ‑2)
FH 7	Largest and heaviest geostationary communication satellite ever launched. Both side boosters returned to the launch site while the center core was expended. First second stage featuring Falcon medium coast mission-extension kit.								

=== August ===
Flight No.	Date and time (UTC)	Version, booster	Launch site	Payload	Payload mass	Orbit	Customer	Launch outcome	Booster landing
243	3 August 2023; 05:00	F9 B5; B1077‑6	Cape Canaveral, SLC‑40	Galaxy 37	~5,063 kg (11,162 lb)	GTO	Intelsat	Success	Success (JRTI)
243	Intelsat originally contracted both SpaceX and Arianespace to launch its seventh C-band replacement satellite, Galaxy 37. Launch was previously awarded to Arianespace. Also known as Galaxy 13R, as it replaced Galaxy 13. The spacecraft also contains a Ku-band payload known as Horizons-4, which is Japan-licensed.								
244	7 August 2023; 02:41	F9 B5; B1078‑4	Cape Canaveral, SLC‑40	Starlink: Group 6-8 (22 satellites)	~16,100 kg (35,500 lb)	LEO	SpaceX	Success	Success (ASOG)
244	Launch of 22 Starlink v2 mini satellites to a 530 km (330 mi) orbit at an inclination of 43° to expand internet constellation. This launch marked a turnaround record for SpaceX; the launch occurred 3 days, 21 hours and 41 minutes after SpaceX's previous mission from SLC-40. The previous record was set the month before at the same launch pad.								
245	8 August 2023; 03:57	F9 B5; B1075‑5	Vandenberg, SLC‑4E	Starlink: Group 6-20 (15 satellites)	~12,000 kg (26,000 lb)	LEO	SpaceX	Success	Success (OCISLY)
245	Launch of 15 Starlink v2 mini satellites to a 530 km (330 mi) orbit at an inclination of 43° to expand internet constellation. This launch was to a lower than normal orbital inclination for a West Coast launch, as launches to 43° are normally conducted from the East Coast. Due to the unique orbital insertion, this launch carried fewer Starlink satellites than a typical launch, reducing weight.								
246	11 August 2023; 05:17	F9 B5; B1069‑9	Cape Canaveral, SLC‑40	Starlink: Group 6-9 (22 satellites)	~16,100 kg (35,500 lb)	LEO	SpaceX	Success	Success (JRTI)
246	Launch of 22 Starlink v2 mini satellites to a 530 km (330 mi) orbit at an inclination of 43° to expand internet constellation. 1st time flying a fairing half for the 11th time. 100th launch of a batch of Starlink satellites (excluding launch of test satellites Tintin A&B).								
247	17 August 2023; 03:36	F9 B5; B1067‑13	Cape Canaveral, SLC‑40	Starlink: Group 6-10 (22 satellites)	~16,100 kg (35,500 lb)	LEO	SpaceX	Success	Success (ASOG)
247	Launch of 22 Starlink v2 mini satellites to a 530 km (330 mi) orbit at an inclination of 43° to expand internet constellation.								
248	22 August 2023; 09:37	F9 B5; B1061‑15	Vandenberg, SLC‑4E	Starlink: Group 7-1 (21 satellites)	~15,300 kg (33,700 lb)	LEO	SpaceX	Success	Success (OCISLY)
248	Launch of 21 Starlink v2 mini satellites to a 525 km (326 mi) orbit at an inclination of 53° to expand internet constellation.								
249	26 August 2023; 07:27	F9 B5; B1081‑1	Kennedy, LC‑39A	Crew-7 (Crew Dragon C210.3 Endurance)	~13,000 kg (29,000 lb)	LEO (ISS)	NASA (CTS)	Success	Success (LZ‑1)
249	After first six Crew Dragon launches of NASA USCV award, a further three missions for SpaceX were announced on 3 December 2021. These launches carry up to four astronauts and 100 kg (220 lb) of cargo to the ISS as well as feature a lifeboat function to evacuate astronauts from ISS in case of an emergency.								
250	27 August 2023; 01:05	F9 B5; B1080‑3	Cape Canaveral, SLC‑40	Starlink: Group 6-11 (22 satellites)	~16,100 kg (35,500 lb)	LEO	SpaceX	Success	Success (JRTI)
250	Launch of 22 Starlink v2 mini satellites to a 530 km (330 mi) orbit at an inclination of 43° to expand internet constellation.								

=== September ===
Flight No.	Date and time (UTC)	Version, booster	Launch site	Payload	Payload mass	Orbit	Customer	Launch outcome	Booster landing
251	1 September 2023; 02:21	F9 B5; B1077‑7	Cape Canaveral, SLC‑40	Starlink: Group 6-13 (22 satellites)	~16,100 kg (35,500 lb)	LEO	SpaceX	Success	Success (ASOG)
251	Launch of 22 Starlink v2 mini satellites to a 530 km (330 mi) orbit at an inclination of 43° to expand internet constellation.								
252	2 September 2023; 02:21; 14:25	F9 B5; B1063‑13	Vandenberg, SLC‑4E	SDA Tranche 0B (13 satellites)	Unknown	LEO	SDA	Success	Success (LZ‑4)
252	Second launch of SDA Transport and Tracking Layer satellites. Originally intended to launch the remaining 18 satellites, but a late change reduced this to 13. One was York Space Systems built and 10 are Lockheed Martin-Tyvak Space systems built Transport layer satellites, and two were SpaceX/Leidos built, Starlink-derived Tracking layer satellites. The Transport layer is an interoperable mesh network of satellites intended to provide periodic low-latency and high-capacity data connectivity, while the Tracking Layer consists of interconnected satellites with cross-links and wide field-of-view infrared sensors for hypersonic missile tracking. Fifth flight with short nozzle second stage aimed at lowering costs and improving launch cadence, but is only suitable for missions with lower performance requirements. This was the 61st launch of a Falcon rocket this year, the same number of launches carried out in all of 2022.								
253	4 September 2023; 02:47	F9 B5; B1073‑10	Kennedy, LC‑39A	Starlink: Group 6-12 (22 satellites)	~15,300 kg (33,700 lb)	LEO	SpaceX	Success	Success (JRTI)
253	Launch of 22 Starlink v2 mini satellites to a 530 km (330 mi) orbit at an inclination of 43° to expand internet constellation. With this launch, SpaceX's Falcon family surpassed the yearly world record for most successful launches, previously set by the R-7 rocket family in 1980.								
254	9 September 2023; 03:12	F9 B5; B1076‑7	Cape Canaveral, SLC‑40	Starlink: Group 6-14 (22 satellites)	~16,100 kg (35,500 lb)	LEO	SpaceX	Success	Success (ASOG)
254	Launch of 22 Starlink v2 mini satellites to a 530 km (330 mi) orbit at an inclination of 43° to expand internet constellation.								
255	12 September 2023; 06:57	F9 B5; B1071‑11	Vandenberg, SLC‑4E	Starlink: Group 7-2 (21 satellites)	~15,300 kg (33,700 lb)	LEO	SpaceX	Success	Success (OCISLY)
255	Launch of 21 Starlink v2 mini satellites to a 525 km (326 mi) orbit at an inclination of 53° to expand internet constellation.								
256	16 September 2023; 03:38	F9 B5; B1078‑5	Cape Canaveral, SLC‑40	Starlink: Group 6-16 (22 satellites)	~16,100 kg (35,500 lb)	LEO	SpaceX	Success	Success (JRTI)
256	Launch of 22 Starlink v2 mini satellites to a 530 km (330 mi) orbit at an inclination of 43° to expand internet constellation. This was the 200th flight and 200th success of the Block 5 version of Falcon 9. SpaceX's Falcon family thus broke the yearly world record for most launches attempted (irrespective of launch outcome) by any rocket family, i.e., 64 set by the R-7 family in 1980 after this launch.								
257	20 September 2023; 03:38	F9 B5; B1058‑17	Cape Canaveral, SLC‑40	Starlink: Group 6-17 (22 satellites)	~16,100 kg (35,500 lb)	LEO	SpaceX	Success	Success (ASOG)
257	Launch of 22 Starlink v2 mini satellites to a 530 km (330 mi) orbit at an inclination of 43° to expand internet constellation. SpaceX set a new record using the same booster for the 17th time. 1st time flying a fairing half for the 12th time.								
258	24 September 2023; 03:38	F9 B5; B1060‑17	Cape Canaveral, SLC‑40	Starlink: Group 6-18 (22 satellites)	~16,100 kg (35,500 lb)	LEO	SpaceX	Success	Success (JRTI)
258	Launch of 22 Starlink v2 mini satellites to a 530 km (330 mi) orbit at an inclination of 43° to expand internet constellation. Second booster to fly for the 17th time.								
259	25 September 2023; 08:48	F9 B5; B1075‑6	Vandenberg, SLC‑4E	Starlink: Group 7-3 (21 satellites)	~15,300 kg (33,700 lb)	LEO	SpaceX	Success	Success (OCISLY)
259	Launch of 21 Starlink v2 mini satellites to a 525 km (326 mi) orbit at an inclination of 53° to expand internet constellation.								
260	30 September 2023; 02:00	F9 B5; B1069‑10	Cape Canaveral, SLC‑40	Starlink: Group 6-19 (22 satellites)	~16,100 kg (35,500 lb)	LEO	SpaceX	Success	Success (ASOG)
260	Launch of 22 Starlink v2 mini satellites to a 530 km (330 mi) orbit at an inclination of 43° to expand internet constellation. This launch marked the first time SpaceX completed ten launches in a calendar month.								

=== October ===
Flight No.	Date and time (UTC)	Version, booster	Launch site	Payload	Payload mass	Orbit	Customer	Launch outcome	Booster landing
261	5 October 2023; 05:36	F9 B5; B1076‑8	Cape Canaveral, SLC‑40	Starlink: Group 6-21 (22 satellites)	~16,100 kg (35,500 lb)	LEO	SpaceX	Success	Success (JRTI)
261	Launch of 22 Starlink v2 mini satellites to a 530 km (330 mi) orbit at an inclination of 43° to expand internet constellation.								
262	9 October 2023; 07:23	F9 B5; B1063‑14	Vandenberg, SLC‑4E	Starlink: Group 7-4 (21 satellites)	~15,300 kg (33,700 lb)	LEO	SpaceX	Success	Success (OCISLY)
262	Launch of 21 Starlink v2 mini satellites to a 525 km (326 mi) orbit at an inclination of 53° to expand internet constellation.								
FH 8	13 October 2023; 14:19	Falcon Heavy B5; B1079 (core)	Kennedy, LC‑39A	Psyche	~2,608 kg (5,750 lb)	Heliocentric	NASA (Discovery)	Success	No attempt
FH 8	13 October 2023; 14:19	B1064‑4 (side)	Kennedy, LC‑39A	Psyche	~2,608 kg (5,750 lb)	Heliocentric	NASA (Discovery)	Success	Success (LZ‑1)
FH 8	13 October 2023; 14:19	B1065‑4 (side)	Kennedy, LC‑39A	Psyche	~2,608 kg (5,750 lb)	Heliocentric	NASA (Discovery)	Success	Success (LZ‑2)
FH 8	Discovery Program mission designed to explore asteroid 16 Psyche to investigate the formation of the early Solar System. Center core expended, while both side-boosters returned to Cape Canaveral for landings at LZ-1 and LZ-2.								
263	13 October 2023; 23:01	F9 B5; B1067‑14	Cape Canaveral, SLC‑40	Starlink: Group 6-22 (22 satellites)	~16,100 kg (35,500 lb)	LEO	SpaceX	Success	Success (ASOG)
263	Launch of 22 Starlink v2 mini satellites to a 530 km (330 mi) orbit at an inclination of 43° to expand internet constellation.								
264	18 October 2023; 00:39	F9 B5; B1062‑16	Cape Canaveral, SLC‑40	Starlink: Group 6-23 (22 satellites)	~16,100 kg (35,500 lb)	LEO	SpaceX	Success	Success (JRTI)
264	Launch of 22 Starlink v2 mini satellites to a 530 km (330 mi) orbit at an inclination of 43° to expand internet constellation.								
265	21 October 2023; 08:23	F9 B5; B1061‑16	Vandenberg, SLC‑4E	Starlink: Group 7-5 (21 satellites)	~15,300 kg (33,700 lb)	LEO	SpaceX	Success	Success (OCISLY)
265	Launch of 21 Starlink v2 mini satellites to a 525 km (326 mi) orbit at an inclination of 53° to expand internet constellation.								
266	22 October 2023; 02:17	F9 B5; B1080‑4	Cape Canaveral, SLC‑40	Starlink: Group 6-24 (23 satellites)	~16,800 kg (37,000 lb)	LEO	SpaceX	Success	Success (ASOG)
266	Launch of 23 Starlink v2 mini satellites to a 530 km (330 mi) orbit at an inclination of 43° to expand internet constellation. First time 23 Starlinks V2 Mini were launched and new Falcon 9 payload mass record of 18,400 kg.								
267	29 October 2023; 09:00	F9 B5; B1075‑7	Vandenberg, SLC‑4E	Starlink: Group 7-6 (22 satellites)	~16,100 kg (35,500 lb)	LEO	SpaceX	Success	Success (OCISLY)
267	Launch of 22 Starlink v2 mini satellites to a 525 km (326 mi) orbit at an inclination of 53° to expand internet constellation. New record of launching 22 Starlink v2 mini satellites from the West Coast.								
268	30 October 2023; 23:20	F9 B5; B1077‑8	Cape Canaveral, SLC‑40	Starlink: Group 6-25 (23 satellites)	~16,800 kg (37,000 lb)	LEO	SpaceX	Success	Success (JRTI)
268	Launch of 23 Starlink v2 mini satellites to a 530 km (330 mi) orbit at an inclination of 43° to expand internet constellation.								

=== November ===
Flight No.	Date and time (UTC)	Version, booster	Launch site	Payload	Payload mass	Orbit	Customer	Launch outcome	Booster landing
269	4 November 2023; 00:37	F9 B5; B1058‑18	Cape Canaveral, SLC‑40	Starlink: Group 6-26 (23 satellites)	~16,800 kg (37,000 lb)	LEO	SpaceX	Success	Success (ASOG)
269	Launch of 23 Starlink v2 mini satellites to a 530 km (330 mi) orbit at an inclination of 43° to expand internet constellation. First booster to fly for the 18th time. 1st time flying a fairing half for the 13th time.								
270	8 November 2023; 05:05	F9 B5; B1073‑11	Cape Canaveral, SLC‑40	Starlink: Group 6-27 (23 satellites)	~16,800 kg (37,000 lb)	LEO	SpaceX	Success	Success (JRTI)
270	Launch of 23 Starlink v2 mini satellites to a 530 km (330 mi) orbit at an inclination of 43° to expand internet constellation.								
271	10 November 2023; 01:28	F9 B5; B1081‑2	Kennedy, LC‑39A	SpaceX CRS-29 (Dragon C211.2)	~9,525 kg (20,999 lb)	LEO (ISS)	NASA (CRS)	Success	Success (LZ‑1)
271	Three more CRS Phase 2 missions for Dragon 2 covering up to CRS-29 were announced in December 2020. The mission launched 2,381 kilograms (5,249 lb) of pressurized cargo and 569 kilograms (1,254 lb) of unpressurized cargo and then spent approximately one month on station. Among the cargo was station supplies and science experiments, including NASA's ILLUMA-T (Laser Communication from Space) and AWE (Atmospheric Waves Experiment) experiments, and ESA's Aquamembrane-3 experiment.								
272	11 November 2023; 18:49	F9 B5; B1071‑12	Vandenberg, SLC‑4E	Transporter-9 (113 payload smallsat rideshare)	Unknown	SSO	Various	Success	Success (LZ‑4)
272	Dedicated SmallSat Rideshare mission to Sun-synchronous orbit. Sixth flight with short nozzle second stage aimed at lowering costs and improving launch cadence, but is only suitable for missions with lower performance requirements. Momentus has announced that three sats manifested by them failed to deploy from the Transporter-9 mission. The satellites were destroyed when second stage deorbited.								
273	12 November 2023; 21:08	F9 B5; B1076‑9	Cape Canaveral, SLC‑40	O3b mPOWER 5 & 6	~4,100 kg (9,000 lb)	MEO	SES	Success	Success (ASOG)
273	Third part of SES' MEO satellites for its O3b low-latency, high-performance connectivity services. This is the first time a single booster launched for 8 times in a single calendar year.								
274	18 November 2023; 05:05	F9 B5; B1069‑11	Cape Canaveral, SLC‑40	Starlink: Group 6-28 (23 satellites)	~16,800 kg (37,000 lb)	LEO	SpaceX	Success	Success (JRTI)
274	Launch of 23 Starlink v2 mini satellites to a 530 km (330 mi) orbit at an inclination of 43° to expand internet constellation.								
275	20 November 2023; 10:30	F9 B5; B1063‑15	Vandenberg, SLC‑4E	Starlink: Group 7-7 (22 satellites)	~16,100 kg (35,500 lb)	LEO	SpaceX	Success	Success (OCISLY)
275	Launch of 22 Starlink v2 mini satellites to a 525 km (326 mi) orbit at an inclination of 53° to expand internet constellation.								
276	22 November 2023; 07:47	F9 B5; B1067‑15	Cape Canaveral, SLC‑40	Starlink: Group 6-29 (23 satellites)	~16,800 kg (37,000 lb)	LEO	SpaceX	Success	Success (ASOG)
276	Launch of 23 Starlink v2 mini satellites to a 530 km (330 mi) orbit at an inclination of 43° to expand internet constellation.								
277	28 November 2023; 04:20	F9 B5; B1062‑17	Cape Canaveral, SLC‑40	Starlink: Group 6-30 (23 satellites)	~16,800 kg (37,000 lb)	LEO	SpaceX	Success	Success (JRTI)
277	Launch of 23 Starlink v2 mini satellites to a 530 km (330 mi) orbit at an inclination of 43° to expand internet constellation. First time SpaceX conducted 50th orbital launches in year from SLC-40.								

=== December ===
Flight No.	Date and time (UTC)	Version, booster	Launch site	Payload	Payload mass	Orbit	Customer	Launch outcome	Booster landing
278	1 December 2023; 18:19	F9 B5; B1061‑17	Vandenberg, SLC‑4E	425 Project Flight 1 EIRSAT-1 and others 23 secondary payloads	~800 kg (1,800 lb) (main satellite)	SSO	Republic of Korea Armed Forces Various	Success	Success (LZ‑4)
278	A military satellite of South Korea with a mass of 800 kg. EIRSAT-1 is an Irish 2U cubesat that carries a gamma-ray detector and an experiment of thermal coatings for other spacecraft. SpaceX completing 250th landing of a Falcon first-stage booster this mission.								
279	3 December 2023; 04:00	F9 B5; B1078‑6	Cape Canaveral, SLC‑40	Starlink: Group 6-31 (23 satellites)	~16,800 kg (37,000 lb)	LEO	SpaceX	Success	Success (ASOG)
279	Launch of 23 Starlink v2 mini satellites to a 530 km (330 mi) orbit at an inclination of 43° to expand internet constellation. 1st time flying a fairing half for the 14th time.								
280	7 December 2023; 05:07	F9 B5; B1077‑9	Cape Canaveral, SLC‑40	Starlink: Group 6-33 (23 satellites)	~16,800 kg (37,000 lb)	LEO	SpaceX	Success	Success (JRTI)
280	Launch of 23 Starlink v2 mini satellites to a 530 km (330 mi) orbit at an inclination of 43° to expand internet constellation. SpaceX's 90th launch of the year including Falcon 9 and Falcon Heavy.								
281	8 December 2023; 08:03	F9 B5; B1071‑13	Vandenberg, SLC‑4E	Starlink: Group 7-8 (22 satellites)	~16,100 kg (35,500 lb)	LEO	SpaceX	Success	Success (OCISLY)
281	Launch of 22 Starlink v2 mini satellites to a 525 km (326 mi) orbit at an inclination of 53° to expand internet constellation. 200th landing on a droneship by a Falcon booster. Fastest turnaround of Vandenberg SLC-4E pad at 6 days, 13 hours and 44 minutes. USA broke the world record of most launches by a nation (108), held by Soviet Union in 1982. SpaceX completed 100 launches in 365 days (a year) between 8 December 2022, 22:27 UTC and 8 December 2023, 8:03 UTC.								
282	19 December 2023; 04:01	F9 B5; B1081‑3	Cape Canaveral, SLC‑40	Starlink: Group 6-34 (23 satellites)	~16,800 kg (37,000 lb)	LEO	SpaceX	Success	Success (ASOG)
282	Launch of 23 Starlink v2 mini satellites to a 530 km (330 mi) orbit at an inclination of 43° to expand internet constellation.								
283	23 December 2023; 05:33	F9 B5; B1058‑19	Cape Canaveral, SLC‑40	Starlink: Group 6-32 (23 satellites)	~16,800 kg (37,000 lb)	LEO	SpaceX	Success	Partial failure (JRTI)
283	Launch of 23 Starlink v2 mini satellites to a 530 km (330 mi) orbit at an inclination of 43° to expand internet constellation. First booster to fly for the 19th time. Despite the landing being initially successful, the booster later tipped over during transit due to rough seas, high winds and waves, the stage was unable to be secured to the deck for recovery and later tipped over and was destroyed in transit. SpaceX has already equipped newer Falcon boosters with upgraded landing legs that have the capability to self-level and mitigate this type of issue.								
284	24 December 2023; 13:11	F9 B5; B1075‑8	Vandenberg, SLC‑4E	SARah 2 & 3	~3,600 kg (7,900 lb)	SSO	German Intelligence Service	Success	Success (LZ‑4)
284	In January 2019, the satellites were expected to be launched between November 2020 and September 2021. Seventh flight with short nozzle second stage aimed at lowering costs and improving launch cadence, but is only suitable for missions with lower performance requirements.								
FH 9	29 December 2023; 01:07	Falcon Heavy B5; B1084 (core)	Kennedy, LC‑39A	USSF-52 (Boeing X-37B OTV-7)	6,350 kg (14,000 lb) + OTV payload	High Elliptical HEO	Department of the Air Force Rapid; Capabilities Office/USSF	Success	No attempt
FH 9	29 December 2023; 01:07	B1064‑5 (side)	Kennedy, LC‑39A	USSF-52 (Boeing X-37B OTV-7)	6,350 kg (14,000 lb) + OTV payload	High Elliptical HEO	Department of the Air Force Rapid; Capabilities Office/USSF	Success	Success (LZ‑1)
FH 9	29 December 2023; 01:07	B1065‑5 (side)	Kennedy, LC‑39A	USSF-52 (Boeing X-37B OTV-7)	6,350 kg (14,000 lb) + OTV payload	High Elliptical HEO	Department of the Air Force Rapid; Capabilities Office/USSF	Success	Success (LZ‑2)
FH 9	Classified payload contract awarded in June 2018 for US$130 million, increased to $149.2 million in August 2021, due to "a change in the contract requirements" and was expected to be completed by 14 April 2022. Draft solicitation said the launch was 6,350 kg (14,000 lb) to GTO. A month before launch, the Air Force announced that the mission will fly the X-37B spaceplane. Fourth flight of the second X-37B. Center core expended as both side boosters landed on LZ-1 and LZ-2.								
285	29 December 2023; 04:01	F9 B5; B1069‑12	Cape Canaveral, SLC‑40	Starlink: Group 6-36 (23 satellites)	~16,800 kg (37,000 lb)	LEO	SpaceX	Success	Success (ASOG)
285	Launch of 23 Starlink v2 mini satellites to a 530 km (330 mi) orbit at an inclination of 43° to expand internet constellation. SpaceX set a new record for the shortest time between two Falcon launches at 2 hours and 54 minutes. The previous record time was 4 hours and 12 minutes, set between the Starlink Group 2-8 and SES-18 & SES-19 missions on March 17, 2023.								

== Notable Launches ==
Falcon 9

- On 15 April 2023, Transporter 7 (F9-217) became the first Falcon 9 Block 5 launch to use a Merlin 1D Vacuum manufactured with a shortened nozzle on its second stage.
- The Falcon 9 family successfully launched for the 62nd time in 2023 on 4 September 2023, while launching Starlink Group 6-12 (F9-253). This broke the record of 61 successful launches in a year by a launch vehicle family initially set in 1980 by the R7 family and matched by the Falcon 9 family the previous year.
- The Falcon 9 family launched for the 65th time in 2023, breaking the record for launches in a year (irrespective of launch outcome) by a launch vehicle family on 16 September 2023, while launching Starlink Group 6-16 (F9-256), The previous record of 64 launches was set by the R7 family in 1980.

Falcon Heavy

- The sixth flight of the Falcon Heavy (FH-6) launching ViaSat 3 F1 Americas was the first Falcon Heavy launch to expend the core and both side boosters.
- Over half (five out of nine) of the Falcon Heavy launches by the end of 2023 had been launched that calendar year.

Reuse

- B1058 became the first booster to be recovered for the 16th (F9-238 on 10 July 2023), 17th (F9-257 on 20 September 2023), and 18th (F9-269 on 4 November 2023) time. It was also the first booster to launch and land for a 19th (F9-283) time before tipping over and being destroyed in transit to Port Canaveral.
- SpaceX announced that fairing halves were being launched for the 8th time on 12 February 2023 (F9-203), the 9th time on 4 May 2023 (F9-221), the 10th time on 23 June 2023 (F9-235), the 11th time on 11 August 2023 (F9-246), the 12th time on 20 September 2023 (F9-257), the 13th time on 4 November 2023 (F9-269), and the 14th time on 3 December 2023 (F9-279),

Launch Cadence and Pad Turnaround

- SpaceX's monthly launch cadence for the Falcon 9 family reached eight launches per month for the first time in March, nine in May, and ten in September.
- The shortest time between two Falcon 9 family launches set on 5 October 2022 at 7 hours and 10 minutes was reduced to 2 hours and 54 minutes by the end of the year.
- The record for pad turnaround for SLC-40 of eight days set in April 2022 was reduced to 3 days, 21 hours, and 41 minutes with the 7 August 2023 launch of Starliner Group 6-8 (F9-244).

== See also ==
- List of Falcon 1 launches
- List of Falcon 9 first-stage boosters
- List of SpaceX Dragon 1 missions
- List of SpaceX Dragon 2 missions
- List of Starlink and Starshield launches
- List of Starship launches
