= List of Arab astronauts =

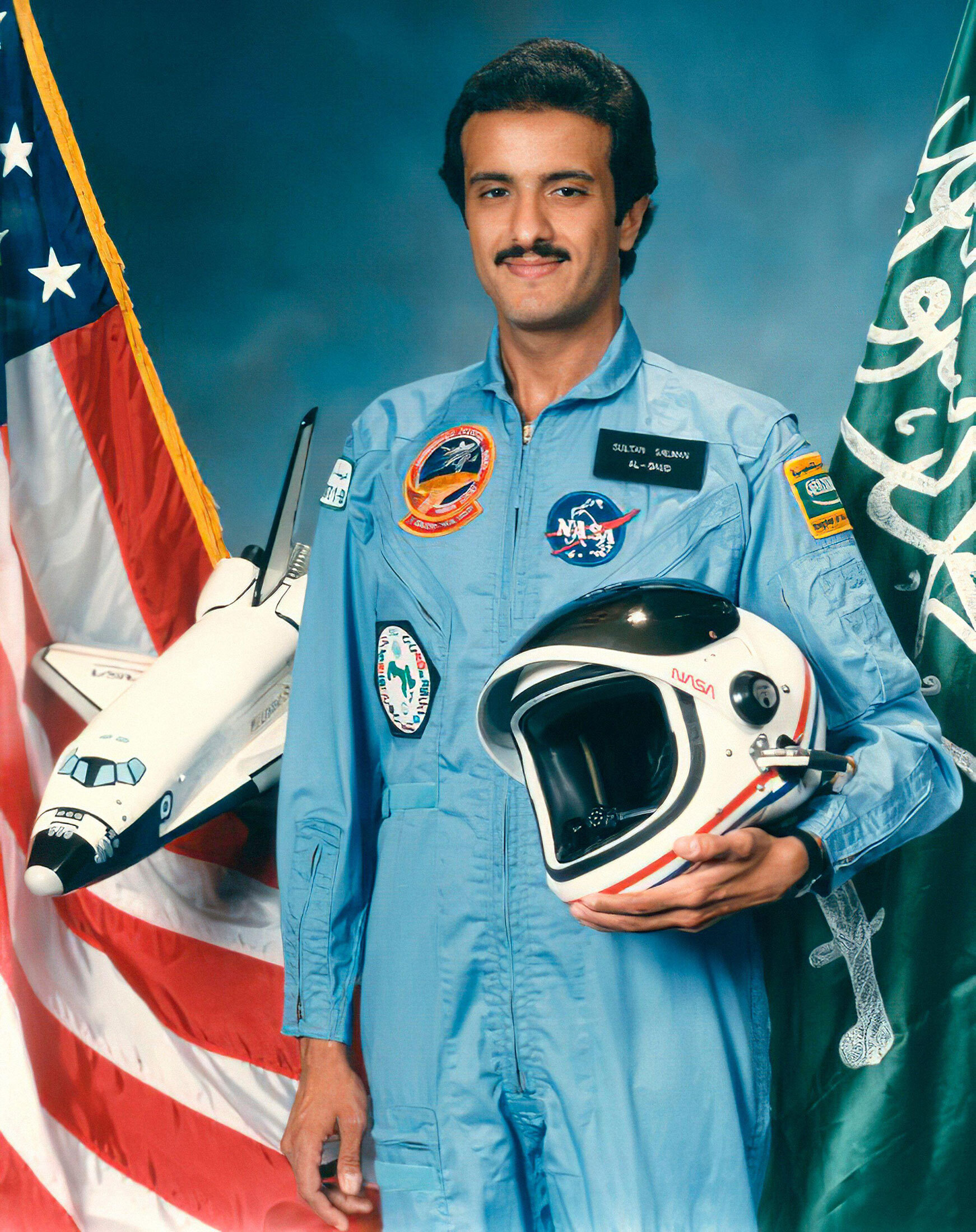
Sultan bin Salman Al Saud, the first Arab astronaut who flew on STS-51-G aboard the Space Shuttle Discovery in 1985

To date, there have been six astronauts from Arab nations, also called "najmonauts" (from Arabic نجم (najm), meaning 'star', and Ancient Greek ναύτης (nautes), meaning 'sailor') who have flown to space.

Prince Sultan bin Salman Al Saud of Saudi Arabia flew in the US Space Shuttle in 1985. Syrian astronaut Muhammed Faris made a space flight in 1987, as part of a joint Syrian-Soviet mission. In 2019 Hazza Al Mansouri of the United Arab Emirates flew in the Soyuz MS-15 spacecraft to the International Space Station and in 2023 Sultan Al Neyadi from the United Arab Emirates flew to the International Space Station aboard the SpaceX Dragon crew capsule. Al Neyadi was later joined during his mission by Ali Al-Qarni and the first Arab female, Saudi Rayyanah Barnawi, both from Saudi Arabia.

== Saudi astronauts ==
In 1985, the Arab Organization of Space Communications nominated Sultan bin Salman Al Saud. Originally a civilian pilot holding a commercial pilots licence, Al Saud, a member of the House of Saud, was born in Riyadh, to King Salman of Saudi Arabia, and holds a bachelor's degree of Arts in Media from the University of Denver, Colorado. Al Saud undertook high-level training before his flight, including: how to deploy the Arab satellite at a distance of 320 km above the Earth's surface, as well as how to use a camera from the unit (Hamlad - 500) to take pictures of geological features of the Arabian Peninsula.

In 2023, Ali AlQarni and Rayyanah Barnawi became the first Saudi astronauts who traveled to the ISS on the Axiom 2 private mission. Rayyanah was the first female Arab astronaut.

== Emirati astronauts ==
On 25 September 2019, Hazza Al Mansouri became the first Emirati to become an astronaut, travelling in the Soyuz MS-15 spacecraft to the International Space Station. During his short stay aboard the ISS, Al Mansouri conducted 15 experiments created by UAE school students and selected under an MBRSC "Science in space" competition, conducted Earth observation experiments, filmed the first ever tour of the ISS in Arabic and became the first Middle eastern person to be studied following time in microgravity.

Sultan Al Neyadi became the second Emirati astronaut who traveled to the ISS on the SpaceX Crew-6 mission. Nora Al Matrooshi and Mohammad Al Mulla are other UAE astronauts.

== Syrian astronaut ==
Muhammed Faris was a Syrian astronaut born in Aleppo in 1951. Faris was the first Syrian astronaut and second Arab into space, flying in the Soviet spacecraft Soyuz M3 (TM-2) to space station Mir on 22 July 1987 with two Soviet cosmonauts in the program for cooperation in space between Syria and the Soviet Union. He is credited with carrying the first recorded Earth dirt into space, which was a vial carrying soil from Damascus.

== Astronaut of Iraqi descent ==
On 25 September 2019, Jessica Meir whose father is of Sephardic Jewish descent and was born in Baghdad, travelled in the Soyuz MS-15 spacecraft to the International Space Station. She delivered an empowering video message of support to kids on the Hope Buses in Baghdad.

== List ==
Image	Country	Name	Mission (launch date)	Insignia	Description
	Saudi Arabia	Sultan bin Salman Al Saud	STS-51-G (June 17, 1985) on the Space Shuttle Discovery		First Arab, first Saudi, first member of royalty in space.
	(Ba'athist Syria) Syria	Muhammed Faris	Mir EP-1 (July 22, 1987) to the Russian Mir Space Station		First Syrian in space; second Arab in space.
	United Arab Emirates	Hazza Al Mansouri	Soyuz MS-15 (September 25, 2019) to the ISS		First Emirati in space and ISS; third Arab in space.
	Egypt	Sara Sabry	Blue Origin NS-22 (August 4, 2022)		First Egyptian woman in space; first African woman in space.
	United Arab Emirates	Sultan Al Neyadi	SpaceX Crew-6 (March 2, 2023) to the ISS		Second Emirati in space; fifth Arab in space; first Arab to complete Extravehicular activity.
	Saudi Arabia	Ali AlQarni	Axiom Mission 2 (May 21, 2023) to the ISS		First male Saudi to ISS.
	Saudi Arabia	Rayyanah Barnawi	Axiom Mission 2 (May 21, 2023) to the ISS		First female Arab astronaut, first Saudi woman in space.

== See also ==
- List of Muslim astronauts
