= List of Muslim astronauts =

This is a list of astronauts of Muslim origin who have traveled to outer space. As of 2024, 18 of them (14 men and 4 women) have been in outer space. Except Abdul Ahad Momand, Muhammed Faris and Talgat Musabayev, all of them are alive as of October 2025.

== List of Muslim astronauts ==
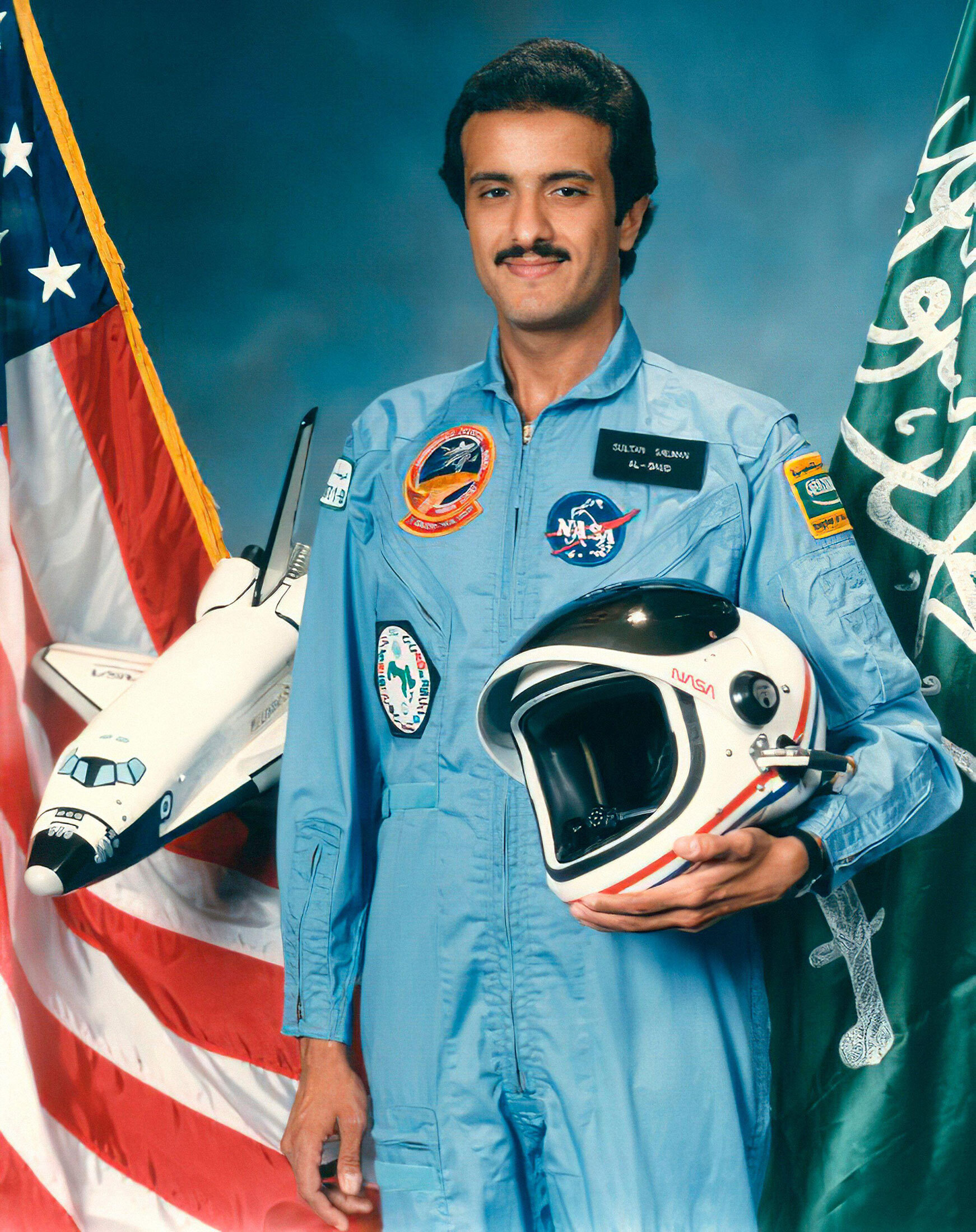
Sultan bin Salman Al Saud, the first Arab and Muslim to fly in outer space.

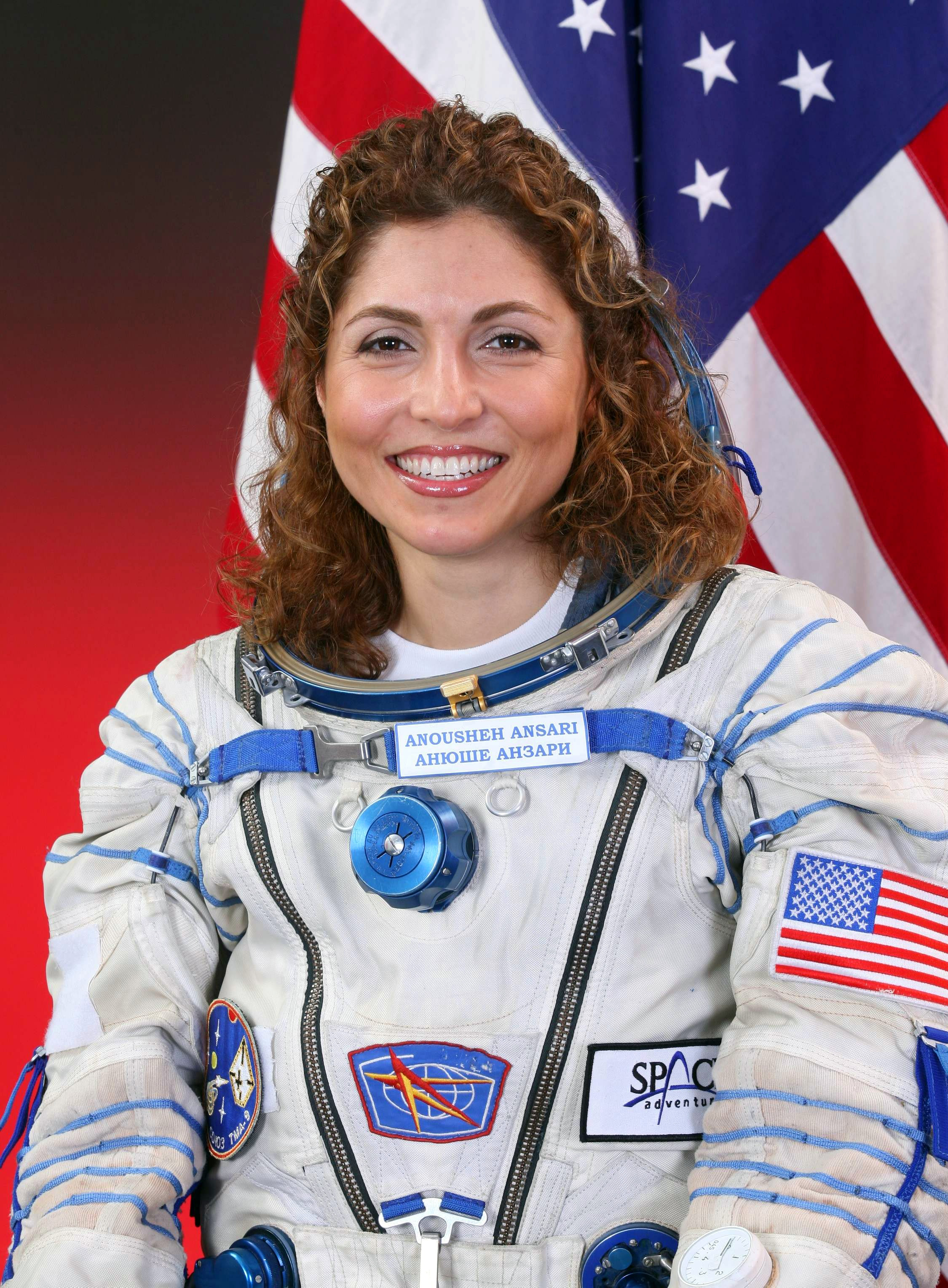
Anousheh Ansari, the first female Muslim and Iranian American in space.

Country	Name	Mission (launch date)	Insignia	Description
Saudi Arabia	Sultan bin Salman Al Saud	STS-51-G (June 17, 1985)		First Muslim, first Saudi, first Arab, first member of royalty in space.
Ba'athist Syria	Muhammed Faris	Mir EP-1 (July 22, 1987)		First Syrian in space; second Arab in space.
Soviet Union (currently Azerbaijan)	Musa Manarov	Mir EO-3 (December 21, 1987); Soyuz TM-11 (December 2, 1990)		First North Caucasian in space. Total of 541 days in space.
Afghanistan	Abdul Ahad Momand	Mir EP-3 (August 29, 1988)		Only Afghan and Pashtun in space.
Soviet Union (currently Kazakhstan)	Toktar Aubakirov	Soyuz TM-13 (October 2, 1991)		First Kazakh in space.
Russia (born in Kazakhstan)	Talgat Musabayev	Soyuz TM-19 (November 4, 1994); Soyuz TM-27 (August 25, 1998); Soyuz TM-32 (May 6, 2001)		Second Kazakh in space. Total of 341 days in space.
Russia (born in Kyrgyzstan)	Salizhan Sharipov	STS-89 (January 20, 1998); Expedition 10 (October 14, 2004)		First Tajik-Uzbek in space. Total of 201 days in space.
United States (born in Iran)	Anousheh Ansari	Soyuz TMA-9 (September 18, 2006)		First female space tourist; first Muslim woman in space; first Iranian in space.
Malaysia	Sheikh Muszaphar Shukor	Soyuz TMA-11 (October 10, 2007)		First Malaysian Malay in space.
Kazakhstan	Aidyn Aimbetov	Soyuz TMA-18M (September 2, 2015)		Third Kazakh in space.
United Arab Emirates	Hazza Al Mansouri	Soyuz MS-15 (September 25, 2019)		First Emirati in space; third Arab in space.
Egypt	Sara Sabry	Blue Origin NS-22 (August 4, 2022)		Suborbital flight. First Egyptian and African in space; first Arab woman in space; second Muslim woman in space.
United Arab Emirates	Sultan Al Neyadi	SpaceX Crew-6 (March 2, 2023)		Second Emirati in space; fifth Arab in space.
Saudi Arabia	Ali Al Qarni	Axiom Mission 2 (May 21, 2023)		First male Saudi to ISS.
Saudi Arabia	Rayyanah Barnawi	Axiom Mission 2 (May 21, 2023)		First Saudi woman in space; second Arab woman in space; third Muslim woman in space.
Pakistan	Namira Salim	Galactic 04 (October 6, 2023)		First Pakistani woman in space; First South Asian woman in space; fourth Muslim woman in space.
Turkey	Alper Gezeravcı	Axiom Mission 3 (18 January, 2024)		First Turk in space and to ISS.
Turkey	Tuva Cihangir Atasever	Galactic 07 (07 June, 2024)		Second Turkish-Azeri astronaut
US (born in Iran)	Eiman Jahangir	Blue Origin NS-26 (29 August, 2024)		

== Praying towards Mecca in space ==
Malaysia's space agency, Angkasa, convened a conference of 150 Islamic scientists and scholars in 2006 to address the question, among others, of how to pray towards Mecca in space. A document was produced in early 2007 called "A Guideline of Performing Ibadah (worship) at the International Space Station (ISS)" and was approved by Malaysia's National Fatwa Council.

== See also ==
- Angkasawan program
- List of Arab astronauts
- Ramadan#Ramadan in Earth orbit
