= Crew Dragon Freedom =

SpaceX Crew Dragon spacecraft

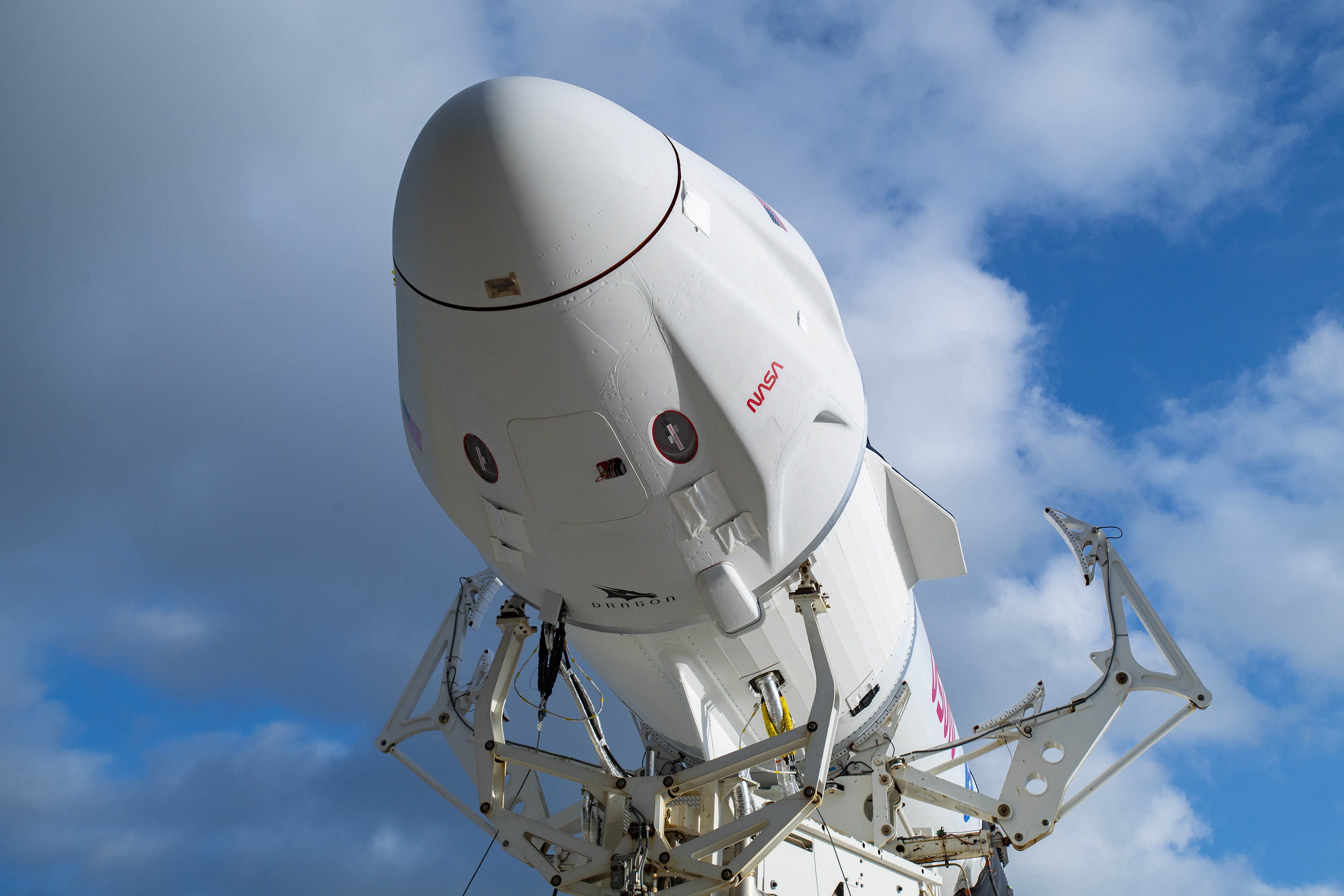
- Crew Dragon Freedom during rollout to pad 39A in April 2022.
- Type: Space capsule
- Class: Dragon 2
- Eponym: Freedom 7
- Serial no.: C212
- Owner: SpaceX
- Manufacturer: SpaceX

Specifications
- Dimensions: 4.4 m × 3.7 m (14 ft × 12 ft)
- Power: Solar panel
- Rocket: Falcon 9 Block 5

History
- Location: California
- First flight: 27 April–14 October 2022; Crew-4
- Last flight: 13 February 2026–8 October 2026; Crew‑12
- Flights: 5
- Flight time: 609 days, 20 hours, and 6 minutes

Dragon 2s

Crew Dragon Freedom (serial number C212) is the fourth operational Crew Dragon reusable spacecraft manufactured and operated by SpaceX. It first launched on 27 April 2022 to the International Space Station (ISS) on the SpaceX Crew-4 mission. It was subsequently used for two private spaceflight missions to the ISS operated by Axiom Space, Axiom Mission 2 in May 2023 and Axiom Mission 3 in January 2024. It most recently launched to space in February 2026 on the SpaceX Crew-12 mission. The capsule was named after the fundamental human right of freedom and the Freedom 7 capsule that took astronaut Alan Shepard on the first human spaceflight from the United States.

== History ==
On 23 March 2022, it was announced that Dragon C212 had been given the name Freedom. Astronaut Kjell Lindgren said that the name was chosen, because it celebrates a fundamental human right, and the industry and innovation that emanate from the unencumbered human spirit. The name also honors Freedom 7, the space capsule used by Alan Shepard's Mercury Redstone 3, the first United States human spaceflight mission (May 5, 1961).

On 16 April 2022, Freedom was transported from SpaceX's processing facility in Cape Canaveral to Launch Complex 39A at Kennedy Space Center. Freedom's maiden flight, SpaceX Crew-4, was originally scheduled for 20 April 2022 but was delayed to 23 April due to launch preparations. The mission was later delayed again because the docking port needed for arrival (Harmony zenith port) was occupied by Crew Dragon Endeavour on Axiom Mission 1 (Ax-1). Ax-1's departure, originally set for 19 April, was delayed until 25 April due to bad weather in the recovery zones in the Atlantic Ocean. Freedom successfully launched for SpaceX Crew-4 on 27 April 2022.

== Flights ==
List includes only completed or currently manifested missions. Dates are listed in UTC, and for future events, they are the earliest possible opportunities (also known as NET dates) and may change.

Flight No.	Mission and Patch	Launch	Landing	Duration	Remarks	Crew	Outcome
1	Crew-4	27 April 2022, 07:52:55	14 October 2022, 20:55:02	170 days, 13 hours, 2 minutes	Long duration mission. Ferried four members of the Expedition 67/68 crew to the ISS.	Kjell N. Lindgren; Robert Hines; Samantha Cristoforetti; Jessica Watkins	Success
2	Axiom Mission 2 (patch)	21 May 2023, 21:37:09	31 May 2023, 03:04:24	9 days, 5 hours, 27 minutes	Fully private flight to the ISS. Contracted by Axiom Space. Axiom employee served as commander, Saudi Space Agency bought two seats and sent two astronauts to research cancer, cloud seeding, and microgravity. Third seat purchased by a tourist.	Peggy Whitson; John Shoffner; Ali AlQarni; Rayyanah Barnawi	Success
3	Axiom Mission 3 (patch)	18 January 2024 21:49:11	9 February 2024 13:30	21 days, 15 hours, 40 minutes	Fully private flight to the ISS. Axiom employee served as commander, other seats purchased by AM, TUA and SNSA/ESA.	Michael López-Alegría; Walter Villadei; Alper Gezeravcı; Marcus Wandt	Success
4	Crew‑9	28 September 2024, 17:17:21	18 March 2025, 21:57:07	171 days, 4 hours, 39 minutes	Long-duration mission. Was the first crewed mission to launch from SLC-40. Launch was delayed and ferried two crew members of the Expedition 72 crew to the ISS and returned them, along with the crew from the Boeing Crew Flight Test because of issues with the Boeing Starliner Calypso.	Nick Hague; Aleksandr Gorbunov; Barry E. Wilmore (landing only); Sunita Williams (landing only)	Success
5	Crew-12	13 February 2026, 10:15:55	8 October 2026, 15:34:13	237 days, 5 hours, 18 minutes	Long-duration mission. Ferried four Expedition 74/75 crew members to the ISS. Longest Crew Dragon mission to date.	Jessica Meir; Jack Hathaway; Sophie Adenot; Andrey Fedyaev	Success
