= Mariam Fardous =

Saudi doctor, humanitarian and scuba diver (born 1984)

Mariam Fardous MBBS
- مريم حامد خليل فردوس
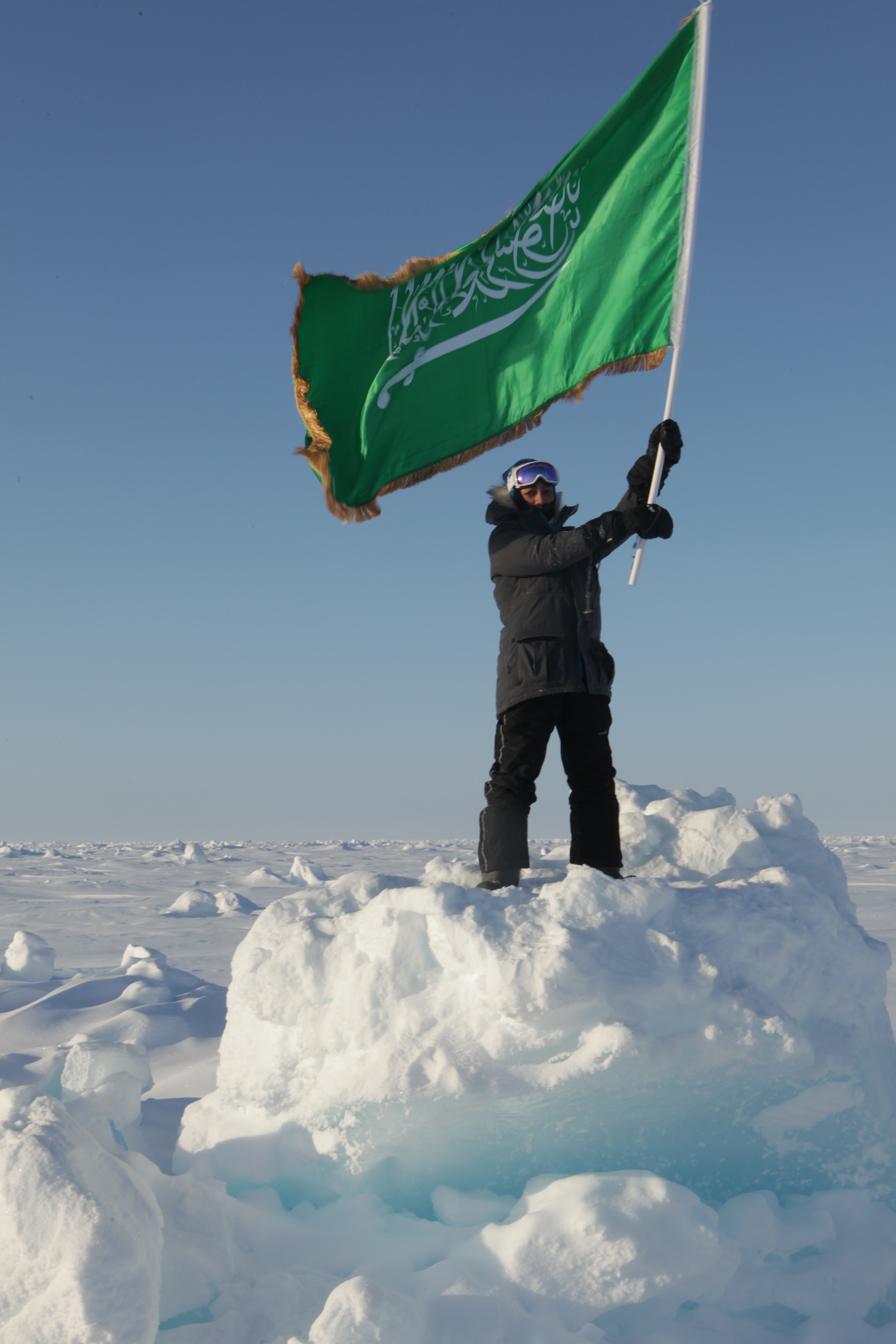
- Fardous in 2016
- Born: 15 September 1984 (age 42); Mecca, Saudi Arabia
- Education: King Abdulaziz University, King Saud bin Abdulaziz University for Health Sciences, Missouri State University
- Occupations: Astronaut, physician, humanitarian, scuba diver
- Known for: Astronaut, first Arab woman to dive in the North Pole
- Website: www.mariam-fardous.com

Mariam H. Fardous (Arabic: مريم حامد خليل فردوس; born 15 September 1984) is a Saudi astronaut, selected as a back-up astronaut for Axiom Mission 2 by the Saudi Space Commission; her selection was officially announced on February 12, 2023.

She is a Saudi epidemiologist, humanitarian, scuba diver who was raised in Mecca. She became the first Saudi woman and the first Arab woman to dive deep in the Arctic Ocean (North Arctic Circle) on 1 May 2015. On 16 April 2016, Mariam became the first ever Arab woman and only the third woman to dive at the North Pole. She received the Bachelor of Medicine degree after graduating from the King Abdul Aziz University in 2009. She also became the first woman from Saudi Arabia to attempt scuba diving in 2015, at a time when women in the country were not even allowed to drive vehicles until September 2017.

== Career ==
=== Medical career ===
She received the MBBS degree from KAU University, Jeddah in 2009 and holds master's degree with honors in epidemiology from College of Public Health and Health Informatics of KSAU-HS in 2017. She also has a diploma of business administration from the Missouri State University.

=== Emergence as a scuba diver ===
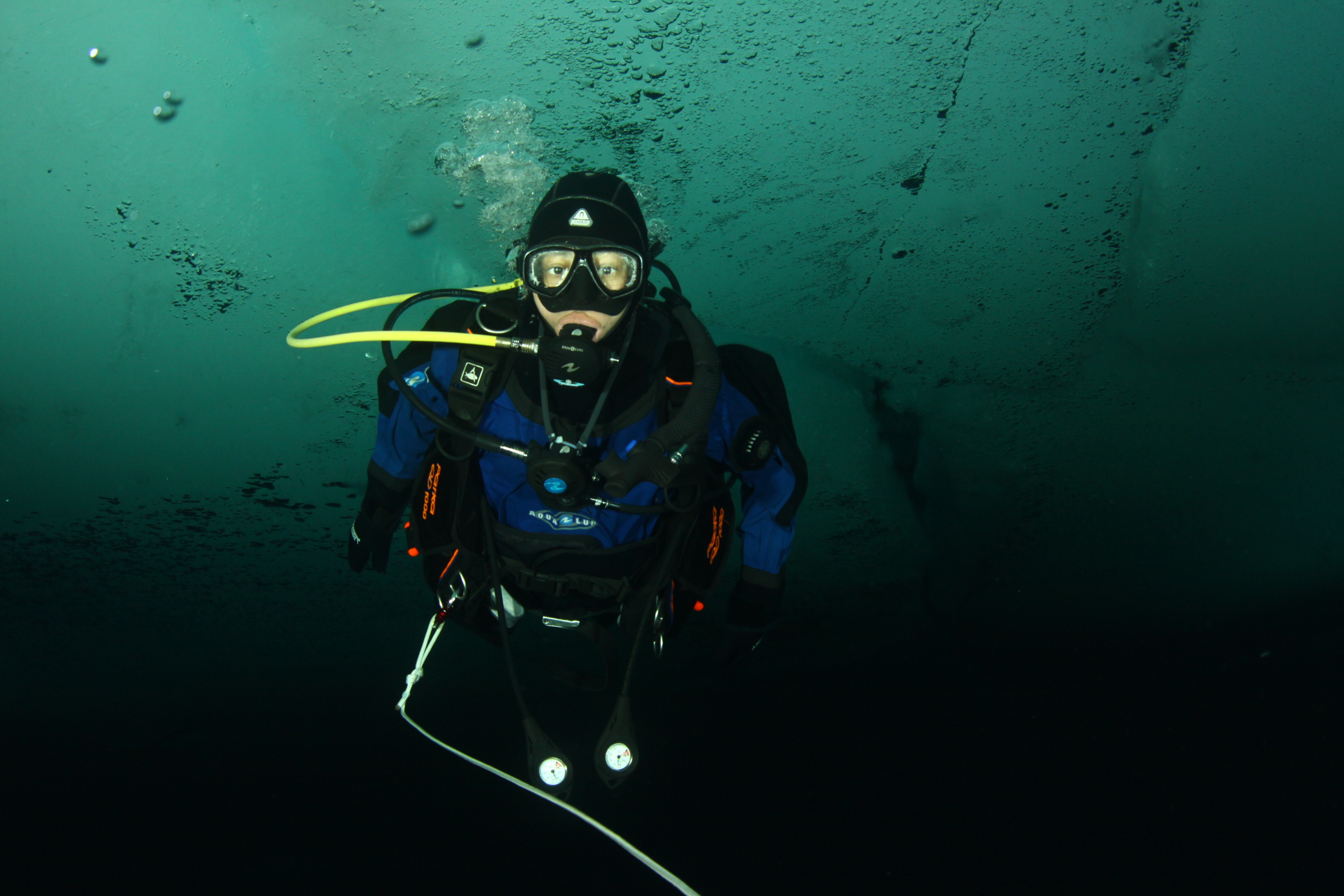
Mariam Fardous dives in the underwater of the Arctic Ocean

Fardous worked as a doctor after she graduated from the Medical College of KAU in 2009. She had already learned to dive in the Red Sea the year before as she was inspired by the stories about diving there which were told by her father when she was a child. She decided to be the first Arab women to dive deep in the Arctic Ocean and then to reach the North Pole Her attempt interested the Saudi women community as they were generally prohibited from driving, competing in sports under restricted women's rights and Sharia law. Many of these were relaxed in 2017.

On 1 May 2015, she became the first Arab woman to cross the North Arctic Circle and later on 16 April 2016 (at the age of 33), she became the first Arab woman and third overall woman to dive in the North Pole. She was the first Saudi physician to dive in North Pole.

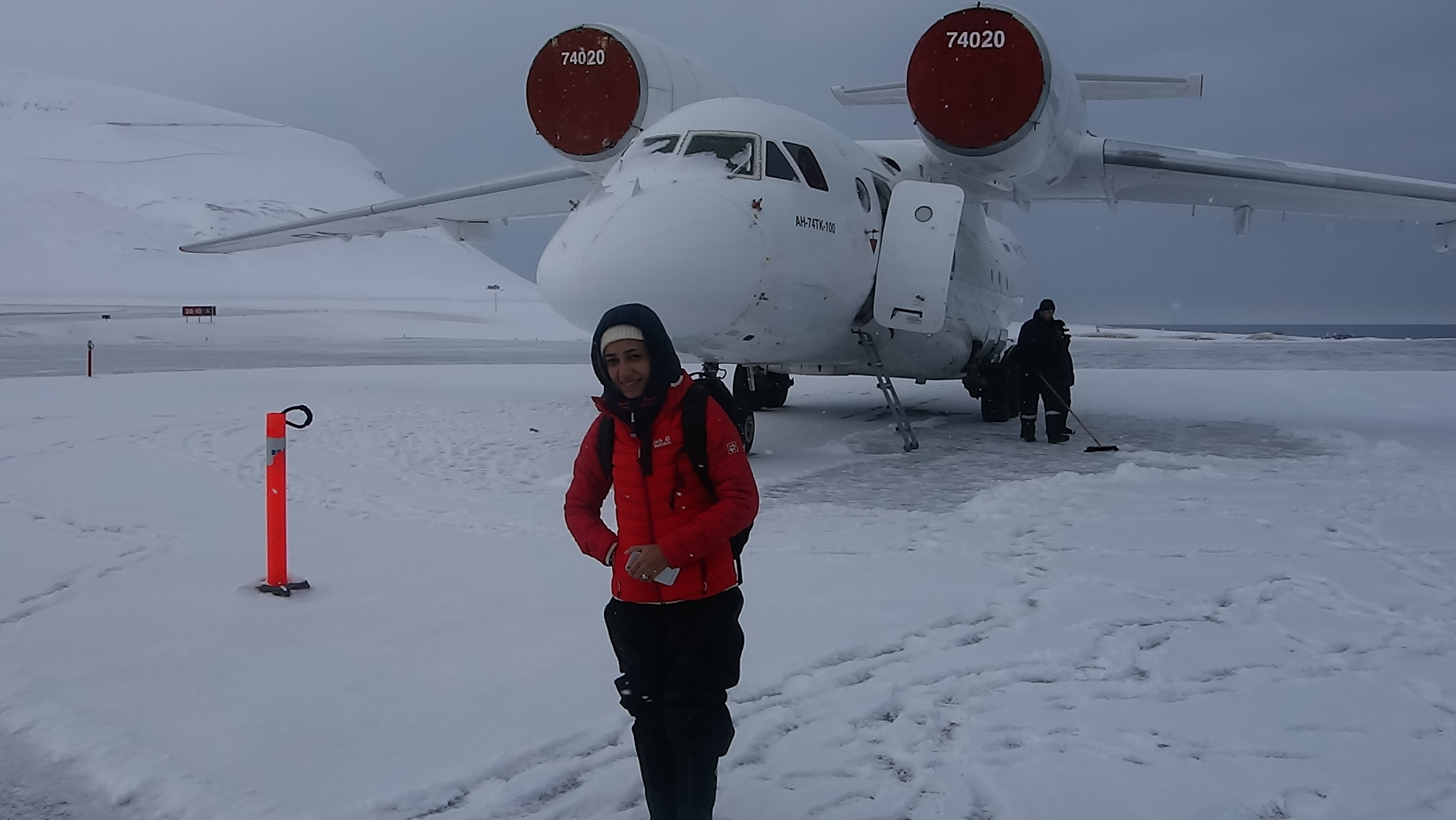
Mariam Fardous poses in front of the Antonov An-74 aircraft after landing in the North Pole

=== Humanitarian work ===
On 7 November 2007, the Ministry of Health in Saudi Arabia recognised Fardous's three years of humanitarian work during the Hajj seasons. On 15 September 2015, she was appointed as the Ambassador for the African Non-profit organization African Impacts.

She has also visited to countries including South Africa, Lebanon and Greece to provide medical facilities to the people in need under the association of International Federation of Red Cross and Red Crescent Societies.

=== Astronaut ===
She was announced as a member of the Saudi astronaut corps in February 2023. Her first assignment is back-up crew of Axiom Mission 2. For her work in space, she was selected as a Karman Project Fellow in 2025.
