= Saudi Space Agency =

Space agency of Saudi Arabia

- وكالة الفضاء السعودية

Agency overview
- Abbreviation: SSA
- Former name: Saudi Space Commission (2018–2023)
- Formed: 27 December 2018; 7 years ago
- Type: Space agency
- Jurisdiction: Government of Saudi Arabia
- Headquarters: Riyadh
- Chairman: Abdullah Al-Swaha
- Chief Executive Officer: Mohammed Al-Tamimi
- Website: ssa.gov.sa/en

The Saudi Space Agency (Arabic: وكالة الفضاء السعودية) is the national space agency of Saudi Arabia. It is an independent agency of the Government of Saudi Arabia responsible for the country's civil space activities. Commonly abbreviated as SSA, the agency is chaired by Abdullah Al-Swaha and led by Chief Executive Officer Mohammed Al-Tamimi.

== History ==
The organisation was established as the Saudi Space Commission (SSC) by a royal order issued on 27 December 2018. The commission was created as an independent entity of the Government of Saudi Arabia to oversee and coordinate the country's space-related activities.

On 14 June 2023, the Saudi Space Commission was renamed and elevated to the Saudi Space Agency as part of a restructuring of Saudi Arabia's space sector. The agency retained responsibility for coordinating the country's civil space activities.

On July 17, 2024, the SSA announced a space cooperation agreement with NASA to collaborate on civilian space research and exploration. This partnership represents a major step forward in the country's ambition to create a robust space sector.

== Activities and programs ==
The Saudi Space Agency serves as the national body responsible for developing Saudi Arabia's civil space activities and coordinating programs connected with space science, exploration, research, and sector development. Its work includes supporting scientific research, developing national capabilities, encouraging public interest in space, and building partnerships with local and international institutions. The agency also supports the use of space technologies in areas such as education, innovation, Earth observation, and scientific data, while promoting the growth of a domestic space ecosystem aligned with the Kingdom's broader development plans.

One of the agency's main areas of work is human spaceflight. The Saudi Human Space Flight Program was launched to prepare Saudi nationals for short- and long-duration missions and to enable them to carry out scientific research in space. The program is intended to develop local expertise in astronaut training, mission preparation, and space-based research, while also expanding Saudi participation in international space missions. Through this program, Saudi astronauts have been trained to conduct research in microgravity and to take part in educational activities designed to increase public interest in science and technology.

The agency's human spaceflight activity became more visible through Axiom Mission 2, which carried Saudi astronauts Ali AlQarni and Rayyanah Barnawi to the International Space Station in 2023. The mission included Saudi research work in microgravity, with experiments covering human health, cell science, and other scientific topics. Saudi students also participated in educational outreach activities connected with the mission, including experiments designed to demonstrate scientific concepts in a space environment. Barnawi's participation made her the first Saudi woman to travel to space, while the mission also marked the return of Saudi human spaceflight after the 1985 Space Shuttle flight of Sultan bin Salman Al Saud.

In addition to astronaut missions, the Saudi Space Agency has developed initiatives aimed at strengthening scientific research and public engagement. Its Biogravity Initiative was established to support researchers working on biomedical and life-science studies in microgravity. The initiative is designed to build a scientific community in the field and to encourage research that can use the space environment to study biological and medical questions. The agency has also organized public exhibitions and educational activities intended to introduce students and the wider public to space exploration, the history of spaceflight, and scientific and technical careers connected with the space sector.

International cooperation is another important part of the agency's work. Saudi Arabia signed the Artemis Accords in 2022, joining a group of countries supporting principles for the peaceful, safe, and sustainable exploration of outer space. In 2024, Saudi Arabia and the United States signed a framework agreement that opened new areas of cooperation with NASA, including space science, exploration, aeronautics, space operations, education, and Earth science. The agreement expanded the agency's role in international civil space cooperation and created a basis for further joint work with NASA and other partners.

In 2025, the Saudi Space Agency and NASA signed an agreement for a Saudi CubeSat to fly on NASA's Artemis II test flight. The satellite is planned to study space weather by collecting data related to radiation, solar X-rays, solar energetic particles, and magnetic fields. The project connects the agency's scientific work with the wider Artemis program and represents a step toward Saudi participation in deep-space research and international exploration missions.

== Spaceflights ==
Before the establishment of the Saudi Space Agency, the only Saudi astronaut was Sultan bin Salman, who flew aboard Space Shuttle Discovery in 1985 as a payload specialist on mission STS-51-G which delivered Arabsat-1B to orbit. He became the first Arab, the first Muslim, and the first member of a royal family to travel to space. Abdulmohsen Al-Bassam was the designated backup astronaut.

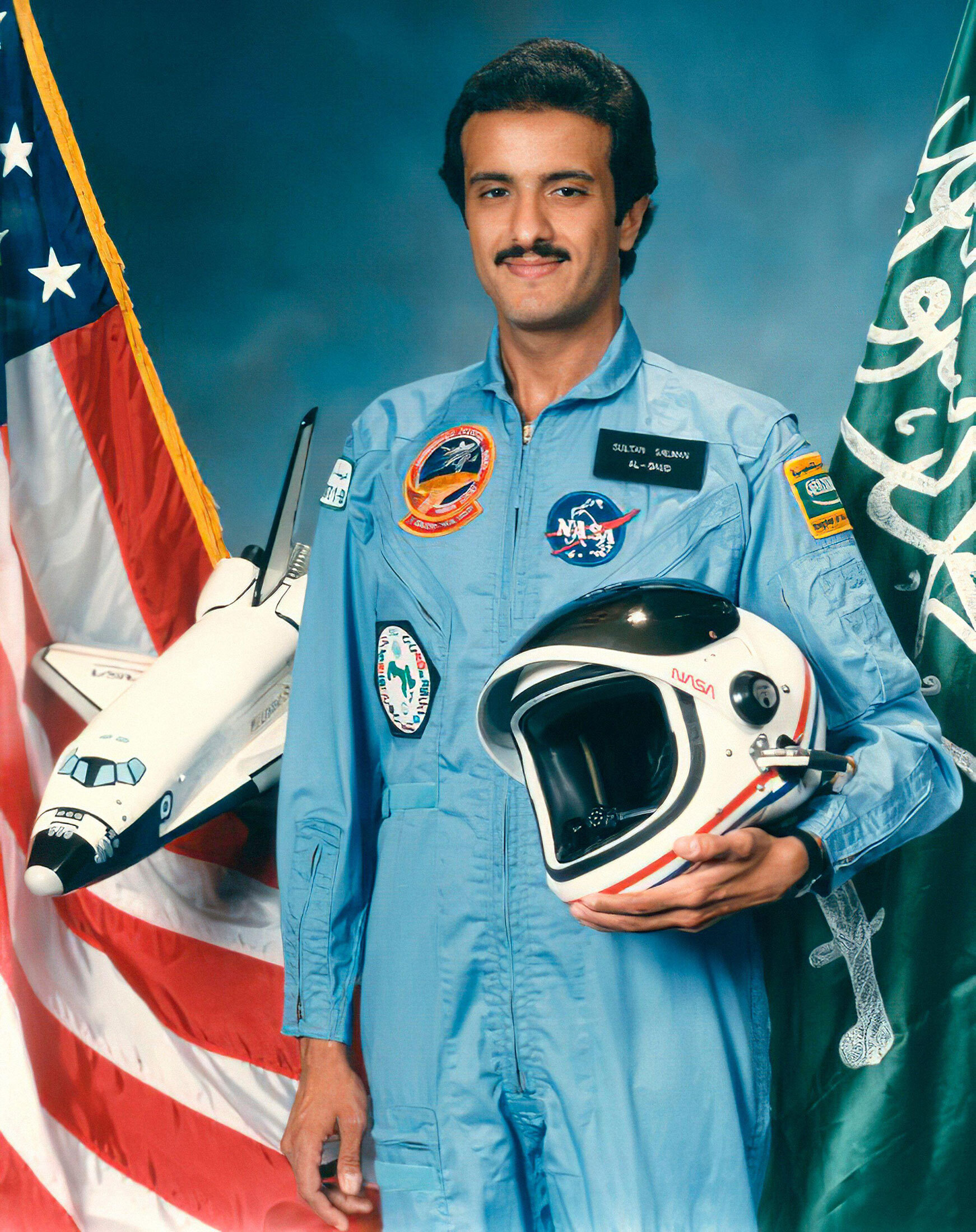
Sultan bin Salman, the first Arab astronaut who flew on STS-51-G aboard the Space Shuttle Discovery in 1985

In 2022, the SSA purchased two seats on Axiom Mission 2, a private spaceflight to the International Space Station operated by the American company Axiom Space. The mission, launched aboard a SpaceX Crew Dragon spacecraft, included two Saudi astronauts, Ali Al-Qarni and Rayyanah Barnawi, the latter becoming the first Saudi woman in space. Ali Al-Ghamdi and Mariam Fardous were designated as backup astronauts.

== List of SSA astronauts ==
Name	Selection	Time in space	Missions
Ali Al-Qarni	2023	9 days, 5 hours and 27 minutes	Axiom Mission 2
Rayyanah Barnawi	2023	9 days, 5 hours and 27 minutes	Axiom Mission 2
Ali Al-Ghamdi	2023	N/A	Axiom Mission 2 (backup)
Mariam Fardous	2023	N/A	Axiom Mission 2 (backup)

== See also ==
- List of Arab astronauts
- List of government space agencies
