= Ali AlQarni =

Saudi astronaut (born 1992)

- علي القرني
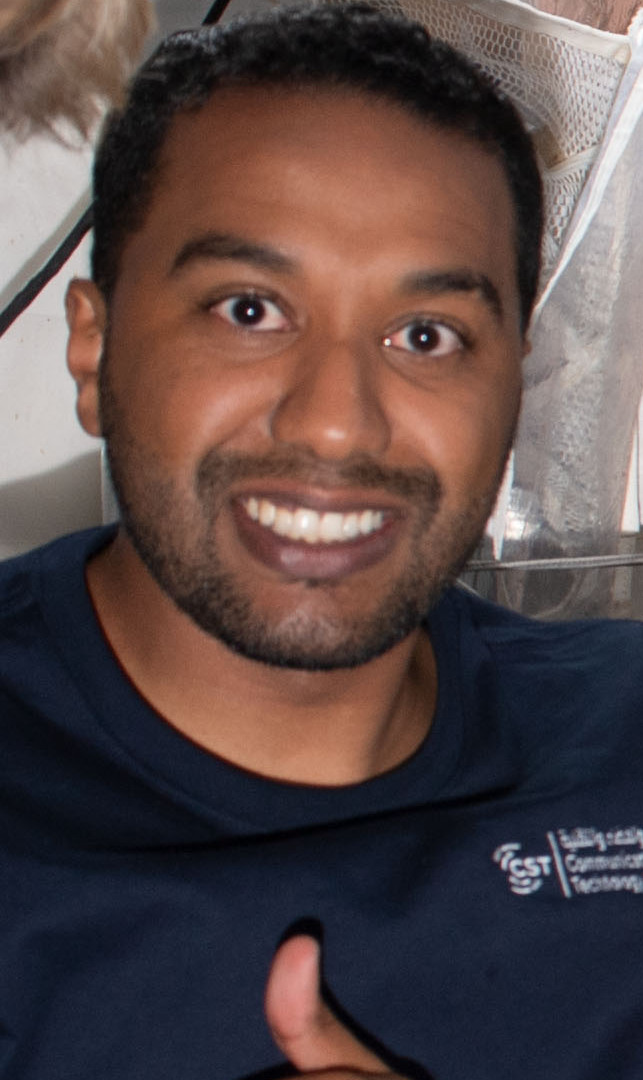
- AlQarni in 2023
- Born: March 1992 (age 34); Sabt Al-Alaya, Balqarn, 'Asir Province, Saudi Arabia
- Space career
- Status: Active
- Time in space: 9 days, 5 hours, 27 minutes
- Selection: 2023
- Missions: Axiom Mission 2

Ali AlQarni (Arabic: علي القرني; born March 1992) is a Saudi Air Force pilot and astronaut who was selected for Axiom Mission 2 by the Saudi Space Agency; his selection was officially announced on February 12, 2023.

He holds a bachelor's degree in aeronautical sciences from King Faisal Air Academy. He is a captain in the Royal Saudi Air Force, where he pilots the F-15SA. He has logged 2,387 hours of flying time.

== Astronaut ==
On May 22, 2023, AlQarni arrived at the International Space Station aboard SpaceX ship Crew Dragon Freedom with fellow Saudi astronaut Rayyanah Barnawi, and Americans John Shoffner, and former NASA astronaut Peggy Whitson. During his eight-day stay at the International Space Station, he conducted several experiments and outreach events.

== Related Pages ==
- Saudi Space Agency
- Rayyanah Barnawi
