= John Shoffner =

American racing driver, investor, and pilot

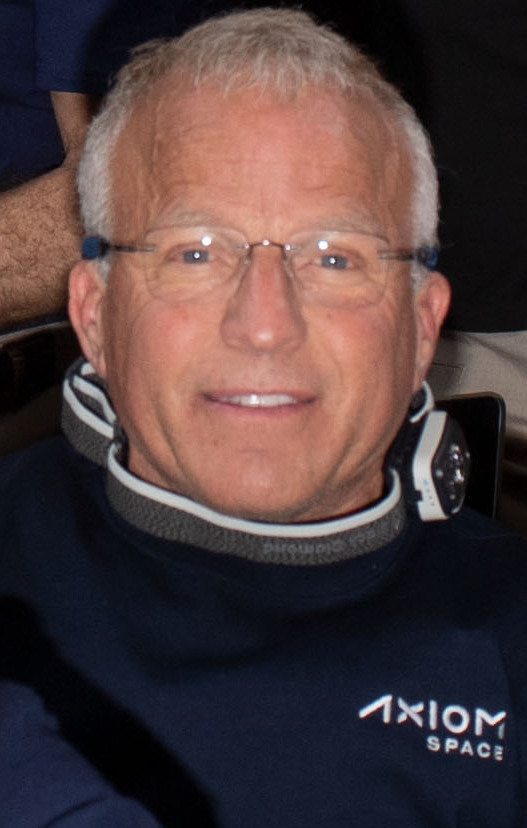
- Shoffner in 2023
- Born: July 25, 1955 (age 71); Fairbanks, Alaska, U.S.
- Occupations: astronaut, skydiver, racing driver, investor, and pilot
- Space career
- Status: Active
- Time in space: 9 days, 5 hours and 27 minutes
- Selection: 2023
- Missions: Axiom Mission 2

John Shoffner (born July 25, 1955) is an American racing driver, investor, and pilot. He was an astronaut crew member on Axiom Mission 2, the second entirely-private crew mission to the International Space Station. Shoffner served as the pilot of the Crew Dragon crew vehicle, which launched on May 21, 2023.

== Biography ==
Shoffner was born in Fairbanks, Alaska. He spent most of his career in Knoxville, Tennessee. Before creating his own motorsports team J2-Racing in 2012, Shoffner was a businessman. He had a 21-year career with Kentucky-based telecommunications manufacturer Dura-Line. He retired as president in 1997.

Shoffner, an air show pilot, has over 8,500 flight hours in fixed-wing aircraft, decommissioned military aircraft, and helicopters. Shoffner owns a Republic P-47D Thunderbolt named "Wicked Wabbit".

Shoffner has competed in multiple sports including water skiing, cycling (crossing the U.S. in 18 days without support), white water kayaking, hang gliding, and making over 3,000 skydives and base jumps.

== Motorsports career ==
Shoffner has competed several times in the Nürburgring 24 Hours. In 2016 he finished 19th overall and second in his class (SP7) with a Porsche 991 GT3 Cup. In 2017 he finished 32nd overall and third in his class (SP7) with a Porsche 991 GT3 Cup.

Shoffner has competed with Team GetSpeed since the 2019 VLN Series, driving a Mercedes-AMG GT. He finished in 13th place in 2019 and 10th in 2020.

Shoffner was second in the 2019 Nürburgring Endurance Series Carrera Cup Class Championship. He holds a total of three in-class victories in the Carrera Cup Class.

=== Nürburgring 24 Hour results ===
Year	Team	Car	Category	Position	Class Position
2015	(Germany) Frikadelli Racing Team	Renault Clio	SP3	93rd	8th
2016	(Germany) Frikadelli Racing Team	Porsche 991 GT3 Cup	SP7	19th	2nd
2017	(Germany) Gigaspeed Team GetSpeed Performance	Porsche 991 GT3 Cup	SP7	32nd	3rd
2018	(Germany) Gigaspeed Team GetSpeed Performance	Porsche 991 GT3 Cup	SP7	31st	4th
2019	(Germany) GetSpeed Performance	Mercedes-AMG GT3	SP9	13th	12th
2020	(Germany) GetSpeed Performance	Mercedes-AMG GT3 Evo	SP9	17th	16th

== Space mission ==
Shoffner paid for a SpaceX Dragon 2 seat on Axiom Mission 2, commanded by Peggy Whitson, as announced on 25 May 2021. The mission launched on 21 May 2023. He was also the back-up pilot of Axiom Mission 1.

During their week-long mission, Shoffner and Whitson conducted single-cell genome sequencing demonstrations on the International Space Station for 10x Genomics.
