= Axiom Mission 2 =

2023 private crewed spaceflight to the ISS

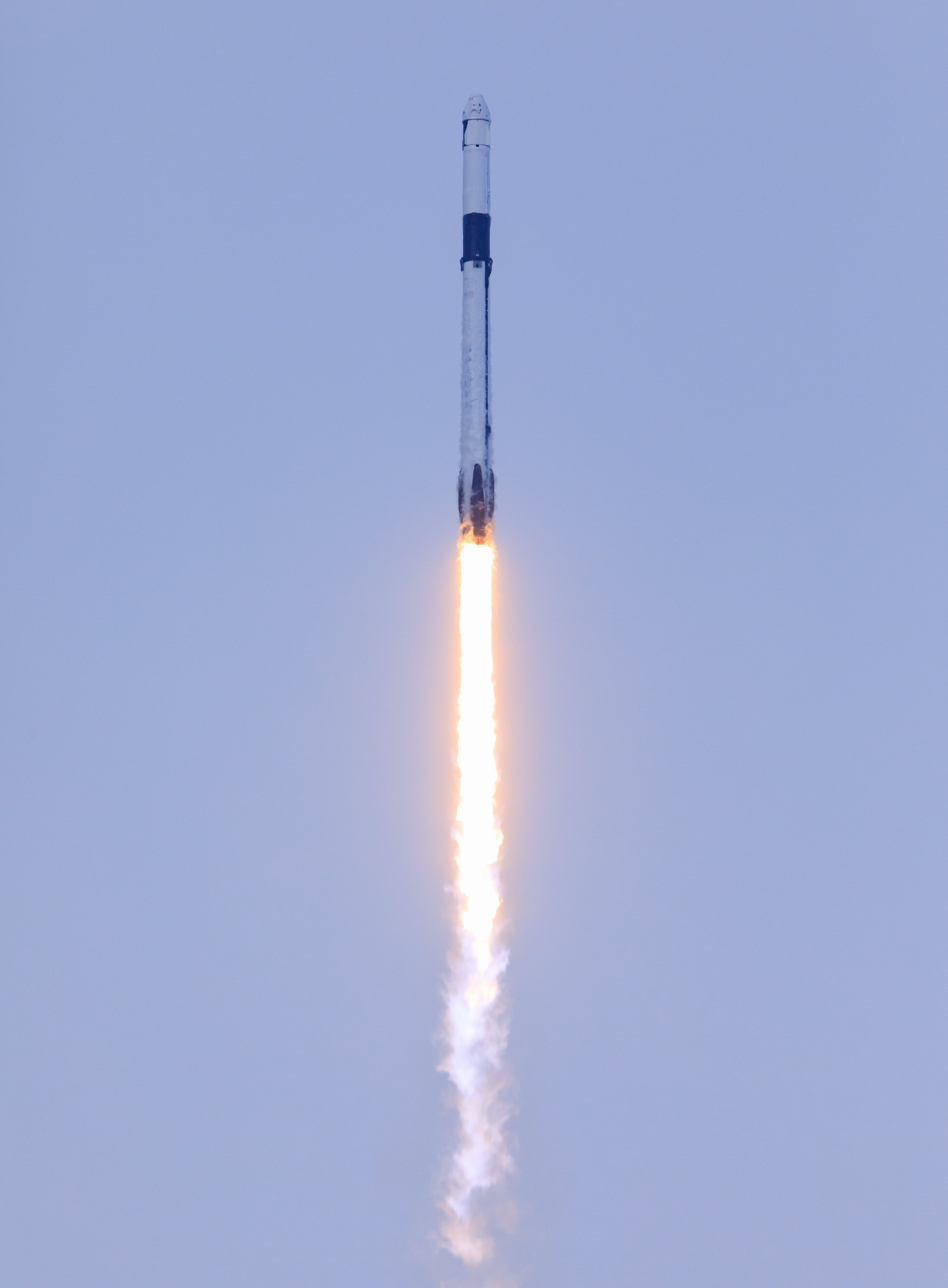
- A Falcon 9 launches Crew Dragon Freedom and the Ax-2 crew to the International Space Station
- Names: Ax-2
- Mission type: Private spaceflight to the ISS
- Operator: Axiom Space; SpaceX
- COSPAR ID: 2023-070A
- SATCAT no.: 56739
- Website: axiomspace.com/ax2
- Mission duration: 9 days, 5 hours, 26 minutes

Spacecraft properties
- Spacecraft: Crew Dragon Freedom
- Spacecraft type: Crew Dragon
- Manufacturer: SpaceX

Crew
- Crew size: 4
- Members: Peggy Whitson; John Shoffner; Ali AlQarni; Rayyanah Barnawi

Start of mission
- Launch date: May 21, 2023, 21:37:09 UTC (5:37:09 pm EDT)
- Rocket: Falcon 9 Block 5 B1080-1
- Launch site: Kennedy, LC‑39A
- Contractor: SpaceX

End of mission
- Recovered by: MV Megan
- Landing date: May 31, 2023, 03:04 UTC
- Landing site: Gulf of Mexico

Orbital parameters
- Reference system: Geocentric orbit
- Regime: Low Earth orbit
- Inclination: 51.66°

Docking with ISS
- Docking port: Harmony zenith
- Docking date: May 22, 2023, 13:12 UTC
- Undocking date: May 30, 2023, 15:05 UTC
- Time docked: 8 days, 1 hour, 53 minutes
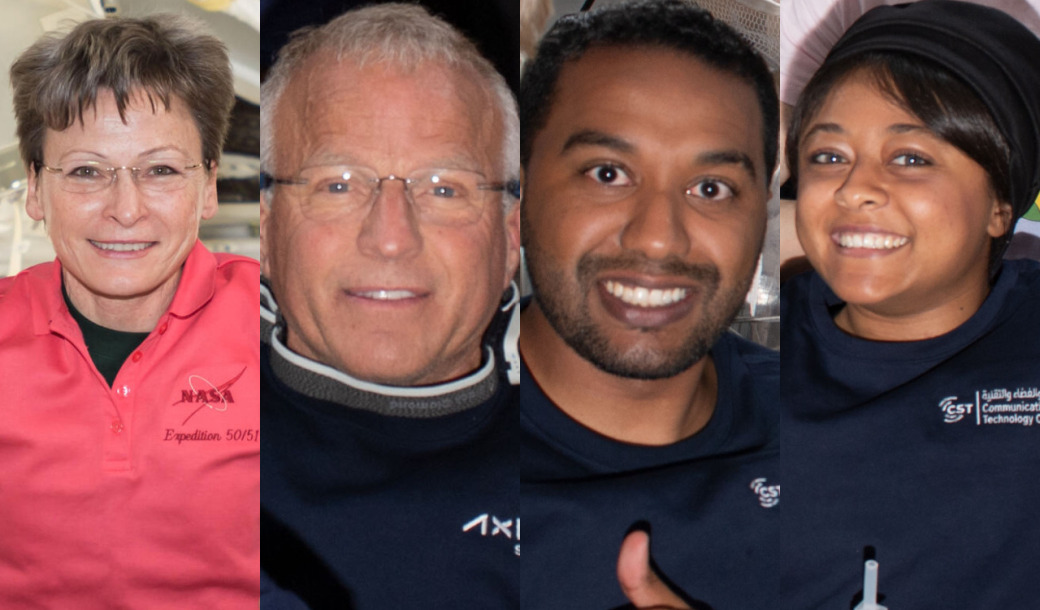
- Axiom Mission 2 patch From left: Whitson, Shoffner, AlQarni and Barnawi Axiom Space missions Crew Dragon flights

Axiom Mission 2 (or Ax-2) was a private crewed spaceflight operated by Axiom Space. Ax-2 was launched on May 21, 2023, on a SpaceX Falcon 9, successfully docking with the International Space Station (ISS) on May 22. After eight days docked to the ISS, the Dragon crew capsule Freedom undocked and returned to Earth twelve hours later.

Ax-2 was the second Axiom mission after Axiom Mission 1 in April 2022 and the third private crewed SpaceX Dragon mission.

== Crew ==
The crew was commanded by Axiom employee Peggy Whitson, a former NASA astronaut. John Shoffner, a space tourist, served as the pilot. The Saudi Space Agency purchased the other two seats on the flight and named astronauts Ali AlQarni and Rayyanah Barnawi to be the Mission Specialists.

Axiom had initially announced in April 2021 that one crew member for the second Axiom spaceflight to the ISS would be selected via Who Wants to Be an Astronaut?, a reality television series to be produced by Discovery Channel. On January 11, 2022, Axiom announced Italian Air Force Colonel Walter Villadei as the company's first international professional astronaut. Col. Villadei was subsequently announced by Axiom as a backup crew member for Ax-2. He would later go on to serve as the pilot on Ax-3.

On September 22, 2022, Axiom Space announced it would partner with the Saudi Space Agency to send two Saudi astronauts on Ax-2 to research cancer, cloud seeding, and microgravity in space. This mission included the first female Saudi astronaut to go to space.

Prime crew
Position	Astronaut
Commander	Peggy Whitson, Axiom Space; Fourth spaceflight
Pilot	John Shoffner; First spaceflight Space tourist
Mission specialist	Ali AlQarni, SSA; First spaceflight
Mission specialist	Rayyanah Barnawi, SSA; First spaceflight

Backup crew
Position	Astronaut
Commander	Michael López-Alegría, Axiom Space
Pilot	Walter Villadei, AM
Mission specialist	Ali AlGhamdi, SSA
Mission specialist	Mariam Fardous, SSA

== Mission ==
Axiom 2 lifted off on May 21, 2023, from Launch Complex 39A at Kennedy Space Center, onboard a Falcon 9 Block 5 rocket. For the first time on a crew mission, the first stage of Falcon 9 landed on land at Cape Canaveral Space Force Station's Landing Zone 1 instead of the more common at-sea recovery typical of crew flights. The mission, which was the second flight of Crew Dragon Freedom, docked with the International Space Station a day later.

During the mission, the crew performed public outreach activities along with scientific research, including studies into the effects of microgravity on stem cells and other biological experiments.

After eight days docked to the ISS, Axiom 2 undocked and returned to Earth twelve hours later. Freedom splashed down successfully in the Gulf of Mexico off the coast of Panama City, Florida. It was recovered by SpaceX's recovery ship Megan.

== Gallery ==
Axiom Mission 2
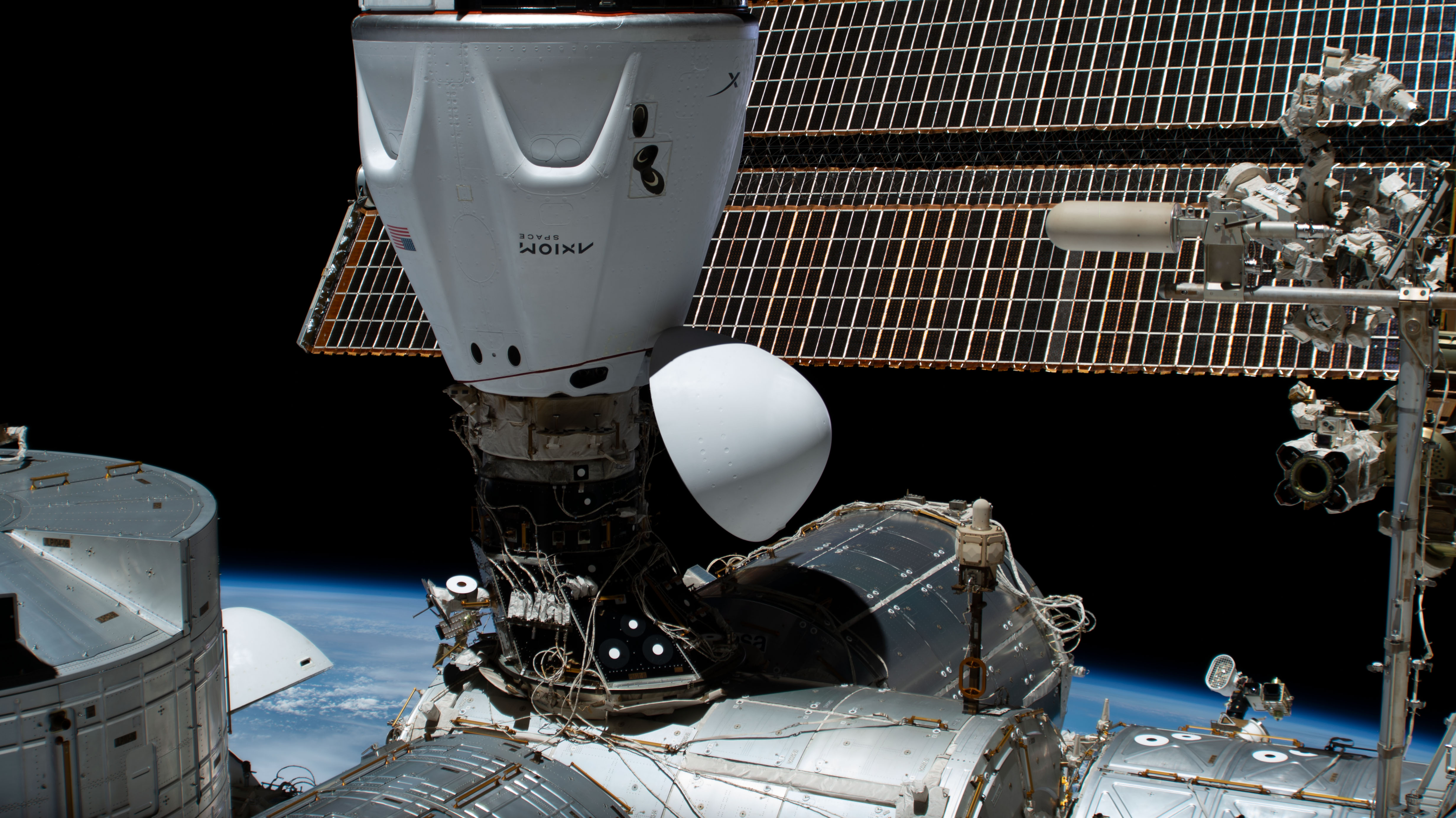
Axiom-2 docked to the ISS

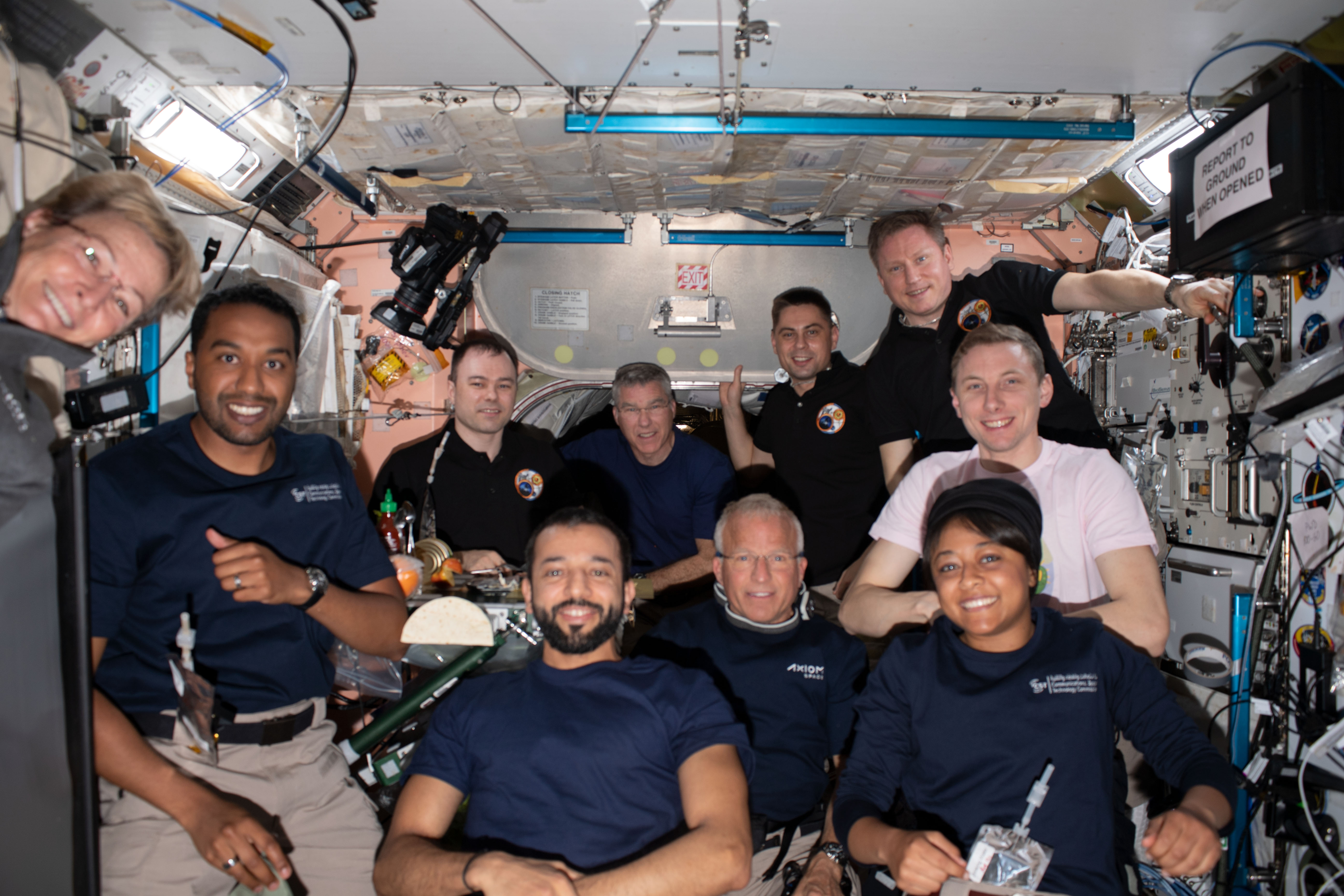
Axiom-2 crew (front row) aboard the ISS

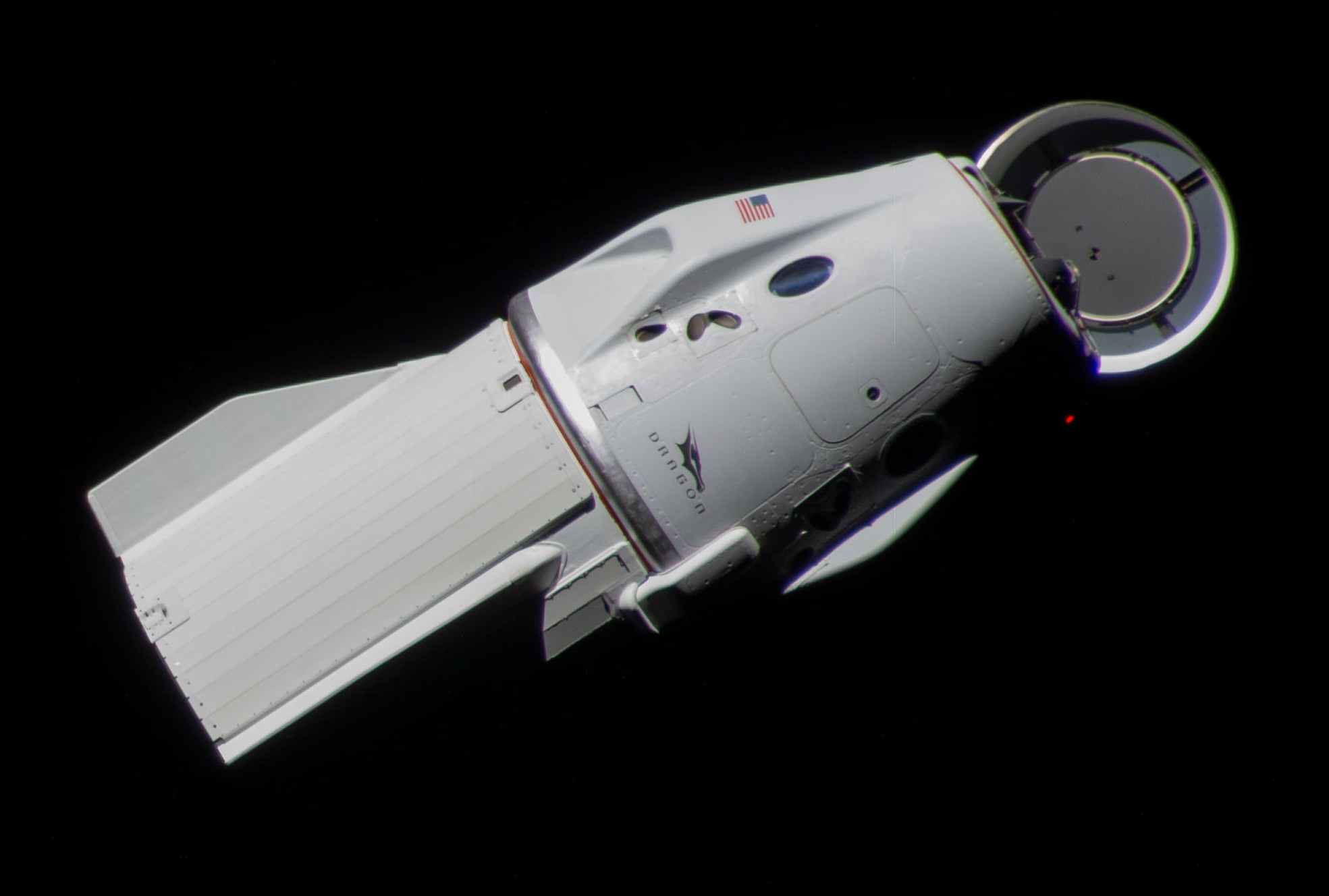
Axiom-2 departing the ISS

== See also ==
- Expedition 69
- Timeline of private spaceflight
