= Rayyanah Barnawi =

Saudi astronaut (born 1988)

- ريانة برناوي
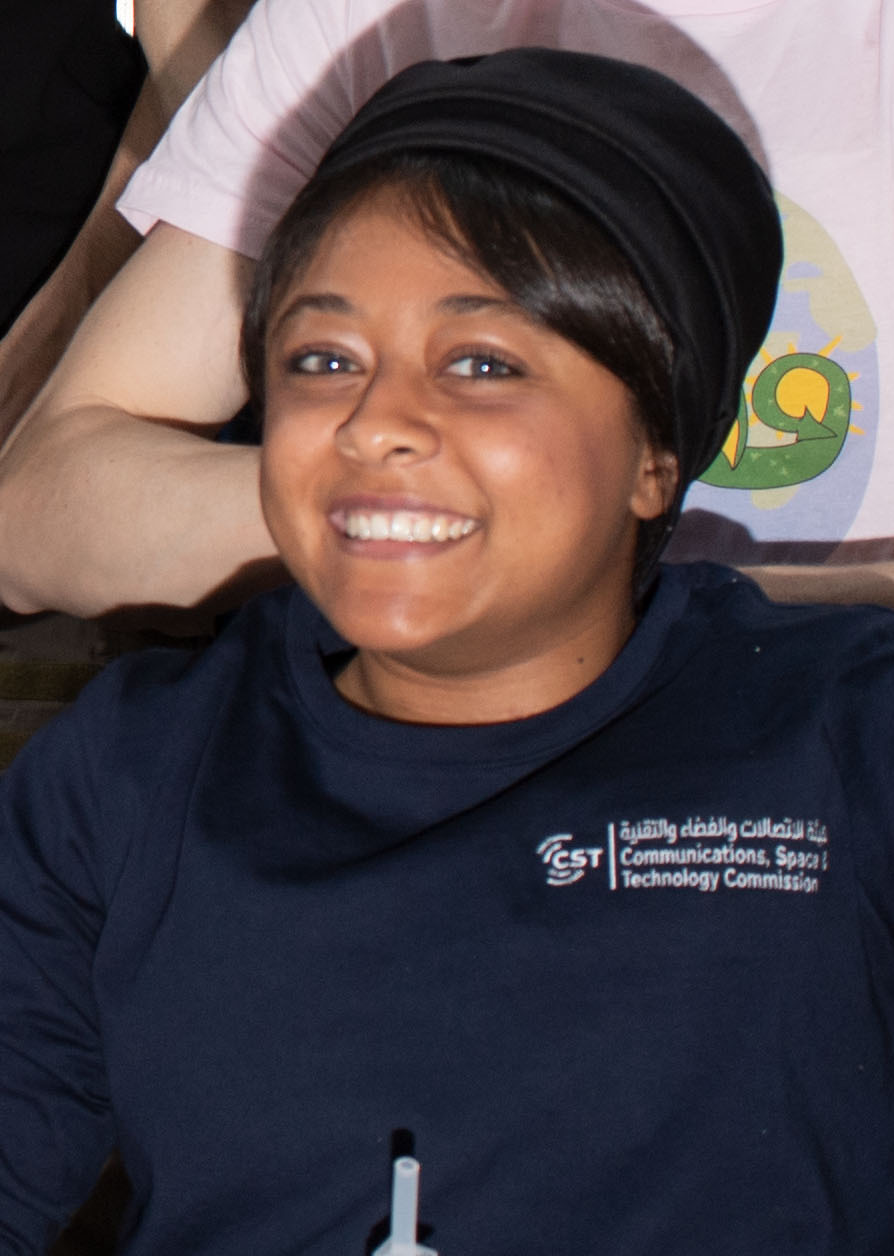
- Barnawi in 2023
- Born: September 1988 (age 38); Jeddah, Saudi Arabia
- Space career
- Status: Active
- Time in space: 9 days, 5 hours and 27 minutes
- Selection: 2023
- Missions: Axiom Mission 2

Rayyanah Barnawi (Arabic: ريانة برناوي; born September 1988) is a biomedical researcher and astronaut. She is the first Saudi female astronaut, selected for Axiom Mission 2 as a mission specialist by the Saudi Space Commission; her selection was officially announced on February 12, 2023.

== Education and research ==
She holds a Bachelor's degree in biomedical sciences from University of Otago. She also holds a Master's degree in Biomedical Sciences from Alfaisal University, where she studied the adhesion of breast cancer stem cells.

== Astronaut ==
At the time of her selection, she worked as a research laboratory technician at the King Faisal Specialist Hospital and Research Centre in Riyadh. As part of the mission, she conducted mission experiments in her field.

On May 22, 2023, Barnawi arrived at the International Space Station on board SpaceX ship Crew Dragon Freedom.

She is the first Saudi woman in space and is considered as the 600th person to fly in Earth orbit.

In 2024 she received the Visionary Award of the Middle East Institute.

== See also ==
- History of women in aviation in Saudi Arabia
