= List of Falcon 9 and Falcon Heavy launches (2024) =

Left to right: Falcon 9 v1.0, v1.1, v1.2 "Full Thrust", Falcon 9 Block 5, Falcon Heavy, and Falcon Heavy Block 5.

SpaceX conducted 134 Falcon family vehicle launches (132 Falcon 9 and 2 Falcon Heavy) in 2024, including the failed Starlink Group 9-3 mission. The Falcon 9 and Falcon Heavy flights accounted for more than half of the 263 orbital launch attempts worldwide in 2024. It again broke the global single-year launch record of 98 launches in a year (set by SpaceX in the previous year with 96 Falcon and 2 Starship launches).

The company had set initial launch targets for the year of approximately 144 launches, or an average of 12 per month, accounting for potential delays due to weather, technical issues, and scheduled maintenance. However, subsequent statements from SpaceX leadership indicated a potential increase to 148 launches, an average of 13 launches per month. Later in November 2024, due to launch or recovery failures leading to several mishap investigations and delays, SpaceX leadership lowered the year's launch projections to approximately 136 launches in the year, which was subsequently missed by two launches.

The company's payload delivery capacity also rose, with more than 1,498 tonnes (3,303,000 lb) (only 85.5% of the launches were reported launch masses) sent to orbit.

== Statistics ==
=== Rocket configurations ===
- Falcon 9 Block 5
- Falcon 9 Block 5 (reused)
- Falcon Heavy

=== Launch sites ===
- Cape Canaveral, SLC-40
- Kennedy, LC-39A
- Vandenberg, SLC-4E

=== Launch outcomes ===
- Failure (Starlink)
- Success (commercial and government)
- Success (Starlink)

=== Booster landings ===
- Drone-ship failure
- Ground-pad success
- Drone-ship success
- No attempt

== Launches ==
=== January ===
Flight No.	Date and time (UTC)	Version, booster (Note: Falcon 9 first-stage boosters have a four-digit serial number. A dash followed by a number indicates the flight count. For example, B1021-1 and B1021-2 represent the first and second flights of booster B1021. Boosters without a dash were expended on their first flight. Additionally, missions where boosters are making their first flight are shown with a mint-colored background.)	Launch site	Payload (Note: Dragon spacecraft have a three-digit serial number. A dash followed by a number indicates the flight count. For example, C106-1 and C106-2 represent the first and second flights of Dragon C106.)	Payload mass	Orbit	Customer	Launch outcome	Booster landing
286	January 3, 2024; 03:44	F9 B5; B1082‑1	Vandenberg, SLC‑4E	Starlink: Group 7-9 (22 satellites)	~16,800 kg (37,000 lb)	LEO	SpaceX	Success	Success (OCISLY)
286	Launch of 22 Starlink v2 mini satellites, including the first six to feature direct-to-cell connectivity, to a 525 km (326 mi) orbit at an inclination of 53° to expand internet constellation.								
287	January 3, 2024; 23:04	F9 B5; B1076‑10	Cape Canaveral, SLC‑40	Ovzon-3	1,800 kg (4,000 lb)	GTO	Ovzon	Success	Success (LZ‑1)
287	Broadband internet provider satellite. First Falcon 9 launch to GTO with a return-to-launch-site (RTLS) landing. First commercial satellite with Roll Out Solar Array that was deployed on January 10, 2024.								
288	January 7, 2024; 22:35	F9 B5; B1067‑16	Cape Canaveral, SLC‑40	Starlink: Group 6-35 (23 satellites)	~17,100 kg (37,700 lb)	LEO	SpaceX	Success	Success (ASOG)
288	Launch of 23 Starlink v2 mini satellites to a 530 km (330 mi) orbit at an inclination of 43° to expand internet constellation. Falcon record for total time from hangar rollout to launch at 6 hours, 33 minutes.								
289	January 14, 2024; 08:59	F9 B5; B1061‑18	Vandenberg, SLC‑4E	Starlink: Group 7-10 (22 satellites)	~16,700 kg (36,800 lb)	LEO	SpaceX	Success	Success (OCISLY)
289	Launch of 22 Starlink v2 mini satellites to a 525 km (326 mi) orbit at an inclination of 53° to expand internet constellation. Second booster to fly for the 18th time.								
290	January 15, 2024; 01:52	F9 B5; B1073‑12	Cape Canaveral, SLC‑40	Starlink: Group 6-37 (23 satellites)	~17,100 kg (37,700 lb)	LEO	SpaceX	Success	Success (ASOG)
290	Launch of 23 Starlink v2 mini satellites to a 530 km (330 mi) orbit at an inclination of 43° to expand internet constellation. Shortest landing-to-landing turnaround of a droneship, at about 7 days. 300th successful mission for SpaceX. Following this launch, SLC-40 was deactivated for planned maintenance and upgrades and would not see another flight until January 30.								
291	January 18, 2024; 21:49	F9 B5; B1080‑5	Kennedy, LC‑39A	Ax-3 (Crew Dragon C212-3 Freedom)	~13,000 kg (29,000 lb)	LEO (ISS)	Axiom Space	Success	Success (LZ‑1)
291	Axiom contracted for three additional private crewed missions in June 2021. The crew consisted of American Michael López-Alegría, Italian astronaut Walter Villadei, ESA Swedish Project astronaut Marcus Wandt and Turkish astronaut Alper Gezeravcı.								
292	January 24, 2024; 00:35	F9 B5; B1063‑16	Vandenberg, SLC‑4E	Starlink: Group 7-11 (22 satellites)	~16,700 kg (36,800 lb)	LEO	SpaceX	Success	Success (OCISLY)
292	Launch of 22 Starlink v2 mini satellites to a 525 km (326 mi) orbit at an inclination of 53° to expand internet constellation.								
293	January 29, 2024; 01:10	F9 B5; B1062‑18	Kennedy, LC‑39A	Starlink: Group 6-38 (23 satellites)	~17,100 kg (37,700 lb)	LEO	SpaceX	Success	Success (ASOG)
293	Launch of 23 Starlink v2 mini satellites to a 530 km (330 mi) orbit at an inclination of 43° to expand internet constellation. 1st time flying a fairing half for the 15th time.								
294	January 29, 2024; 05:57	F9 B5; B1075‑9	Vandenberg, SLC‑4E	Starlink: Group 7-12 (22 satellites)	~16,700 kg (36,800 lb)	LEO	SpaceX	Success	Success (OCISLY)
294	Launch of 22 Starlink v2 mini satellites to a 525 km (326 mi) orbit at an inclination of 53° to expand internet constellation. This landing marked the fastest turnaround of a droneship at just over 5 days. The launch also marked the fastest turnaround time of SLC-4E at 5 days, 5 hours, 22 minutes, and 20 seconds, beating previous record of 6.5 days.								
295	January 30, 2024; 17:07	F9 B5; B1077‑10	Cape Canaveral, SLC‑40	CRS NG-20 (S.S. Patricia "Patty" Hilliard Robertson)	3,726 kg (8,214 lb)	LEO (ISS)	Northrop Grumman (CRS)	Success	Success (LZ‑1)
295	First Cygnus flight on Falcon 9. Northrop Grumman acquired four flights from SpaceX while a replacement rocket stage is developed for its Antares rocket. Eighth flight with short nozzle second stage, which has lower production cost and faster build time but is only suitable for missions with lower performance requirements. SpaceX modified the fairing to add a hatch for late cargo loads onto the spacecraft via mobile cleanroom. Unmanned Enhanced Cygnus cargo spacecraft named in honor of Patricia “Patty” Hilliard Robertson.								

=== February ===
Flight No.	Date and time (UTC)	Version, booster	Launch site	Payload	Payload mass	Orbit	Customer	Launch outcome	Booster landing
296	February 8, 2024; 06:33	F9 B5; B1081‑4	Cape Canaveral, SLC‑40	PACE	1,694 kg (3,735 lb)	SSO	NASA (LSP)	Success	Success (LZ‑1)
296	This was a mission to launch the Plankton, Aerosol, Cloud, ocean Ecosystem (PACE) spacecraft, a 1.7 tonnes (3,700 lb), US$800 million craft, that orbits at a 676 km (420 mi) altitude. It has the Ocean Color Imager intended to study phytoplankton in the ocean, as well as two polarimeters for studying properties of clouds, aerosols and the ocean. The launch price was US$80.4 million.								
297	February 10, 2024; 00:34	F9 B5; B1071‑14	Vandenberg, SLC‑4E	Starlink: Group 7-13 (22 satellites)	~16,700 kg (36,800 lb)	LEO	SpaceX	Success	Success (OCISLY)
297	Launch of 22 Starlink v2 mini satellites to a 525 km (326 mi) orbit at an inclination of 53° to expand internet constellation.								
298	February 14, 2024; 22:30	F9 B5; B1078‑7	Cape Canaveral, SLC‑40	USSF-124 (6 satellites)	Unknown	LEO	USSF / SDA	Success	Success (LZ‑2)
298	Launch included two HBTSS and four SDA Tranche 0 Tracking Layer satellites. Launch part of Phase 2 US Space Force contract awarded in 2022. Second time a second stage featured Falcon medium coast mission-extension kit. 1st time flying a fairing half for the 15th time.								
299	February 15, 2024; 06:05	F9 B5; B1060‑18	Kennedy, LC‑39A	IM-1 Nova-C Odysseus lander	1,931 kg (4,257 lb)	TLI	NASA (CLPS) / Intuitive Machines	Success	Success (LZ‑1)
299	Second mission under NASA's Commercial Lunar Payload Services (CLPS) program and the first successful lunar landing by a private American company. The lander delivered five payloads with a combined mass of up to 100 kg (LRA, NDL, LN-1, SCALPSS, and ROLSES), along with a deployable imaging system, EagleCam, designed to capture descent and surface operations. The spacecraft transmitted data from the lunar surface for approximately two weeks. The LC-39A pad's transporter erector was modified to fuel cryogenic liquid oxygen and liquid methane into the payload before liftoff.								
300	February 15, 2024; 21:34	F9 B5; B1082‑2	Vandenberg, SLC‑4E	Starlink: Group 7-14 (22 satellites)	~16,700 kg (36,800 lb)	LEO	SpaceX	Success	Success (OCISLY)
300	Launch of 22 Starlink v2 mini satellites to a 525 km (326 mi) orbit at an inclination of 53° to expand internet constellation. This mission marked the 300th Falcon 9 launch, the 200th consecutive successful landing of a booster, and the first time SpaceX launched three rockets within 24 hours. SpaceX removed the stiffener ring around the nozzle of Merlin Vacuum Engine on Starlink missions starting with this launch.								
301	February 20, 2024; 20:11	F9 B5; B1067‑17	Cape Canaveral, SLC‑40	Telkomsat HTS 113BT	4,000 kg (8,800 lb)	GTO	Telkom Indonesia	Success	Success (JRTI)
301	Indonesian satellite to provide more capacity over Indonesia. 300th successful Falcon 9 mission.								
302	February 23, 2024; 04:11	F9 B5; B1061‑19	Vandenberg, SLC‑4E	Starlink: Group 7-15 (22 satellites)	~16,700 kg (36,800 lb)	LEO	SpaceX	Success	Success (OCISLY)
302	Launch of 22 Starlink v2 mini satellites to a 525 km (326 mi) orbit at an inclination of 53° to expand internet constellation. This mission marked the second time a booster was flown for the 19th time and featured a Merlin engine that was being used on its 22nd mission beating its own record, having already surpassed Space Shuttle Main Engine no. 2019's record of 19 flights.								
303	February 25, 2024; 22:06	F9 B5; B1069‑13	Cape Canaveral, SLC‑40	Starlink: Group 6-39 (24 satellites)	~17,500 kg (38,600 lb)	LEO	SpaceX	Success	Success (ASOG)
303	Launch of 24 Starlink v2 mini satellites to a 530 km (330 mi) orbit at an inclination of 43° to expand internet constellation. New mass record on Falcon 9 taking 17,500 kg (38,600 lb) to low Earth orbit.								
304	February 29, 2024; 15:30	F9 B5; B1076‑11	Cape Canaveral, SLC‑40	Starlink: Group 6-40 (23 satellites)	~17,100 kg (37,700 lb)	LEO	SpaceX	Success	Success (JRTI)
304	Launch of 23 Starlink v2 mini satellites to a 530 km (330 mi) orbit at an inclination of 43° to expand internet constellation.								

=== March ===
Flight No.	Date and time (UTC)	Version, booster	Launch site	Payload	Payload mass	Orbit	Customer	Launch outcome	Booster landing
305	March 4, 2024; 03:53	F9 B5; B1083‑1	Kennedy, LC‑39A	Crew-8 (Crew Dragon C206-5 Endeavour)	~13,000 kg (29,000 lb)	LEO (ISS)	NASA (CTS)	Success	Success (LZ‑1)
305	After first six Crew Dragon launches of NASA USCV award, a further three missions for SpaceX were announced on December 3, 2021. These launches carry up to four astronauts and 100 kg (220 lb) of cargo to the ISS as well as feature a lifeboat function to evacuate astronauts from ISS in case of an emergency. SpaceX flew its 50th astronaut on this Crew Dragon launch.								
306	March 4, 2024; 22:05	F9 B5; B1081‑5	Vandenberg, SLC‑4E	Transporter-10 (53 payload smallsat rideshare)	Unknown (Note: Many Transporter and Bandwagon payloads are not public, or don't have a publicly revealed mass. SpaceX has not published a payload mass estimate for this mission.)	SSO	Various	Success	Success (LZ‑4)
306	Dedicated SmallSat Rideshare mission to sun-synchronous orbit including the 1,000th satellite of SpaceX rideshare program. Third time a second stage featured Falcon medium coast mission-extension kit.								
307	March 4, 2024; 23:56	F9 B5; B1073‑13	Cape Canaveral, SLC‑40	Starlink: Group 6-41 (23 satellites)	~17,100 kg (37,700 lb)	LEO	SpaceX	Success	Success (ASOG)
307	Launch of 23 Starlink v2 mini satellites to a 530 km (330 mi) orbit at an inclination of 43° to expand internet constellation. SpaceX set a new record for the shortest time between two Falcon launches at 1 hour and 51 minutes. The previous record time was 2 hours and 54 minutes, set between the USSF-52 (Boeing X-37B OTV-7) and Starlink Group 6–36 missions on December 29, 2023. Thus for the first time, SpaceX launch operations for a mission coincided with that of a preceding launch (in this case, payload deployment of Transporter-10:(53 payloads SmallSat Rideshare). It was a new record for the shortest time between three Falcon launches at 20 hours and 3 minutes. The previous record time was 23 hours and 4 minutes, set between flights 298 and 300 on February 14/15, 2024.								
308	March 10, 2024; 23:05	F9 B5; B1077‑11	Cape Canaveral, SLC‑40	Starlink: Group 6-43 (23 satellites)	~17,100 kg (37,700 lb)	LEO	SpaceX	Success	Success (JRTI)
308	Launch of 23 Starlink v2 mini satellites to a 530 km (330 mi) orbit at an inclination of 43° to expand internet constellation.								
309	March 11, 2024; 04:09	F9 B5; B1063‑17	Vandenberg, SLC‑4E	Starlink: Group 7-17 (23 satellites)	~17,100 kg (37,700 lb)	LEO	SpaceX	Success	Success (OCISLY)
309	Launch of 23 Starlink v2 mini satellites to a 525 km (326 mi) orbit at an inclination of 53° to expand internet constellation. First time 23 Starlink v2 mini satellites are launched on a flight from Vandenberg.								
310	March 16, 2024; 00:21	F9 B5; B1062‑19	Kennedy, LC‑39A	Starlink: Group 6-44 (23 satellites)	~17,100 kg (37,700 lb)	LEO	SpaceX	Success	Success (ASOG)
310	Launch of 23 Starlink v2 mini satellites to a 530 km (330 mi) orbit at an inclination of 43° to expand internet constellation. 1st time flying a fairing half for the 16th time.								
311	March 19, 2024; 02:28	F9 B5; B1075‑10	Vandenberg, SLC‑4E	Starlink: Group 7-16 (20 satellites) + 2 Starshield satellites	~16,300 kg (35,900 lb) (Starlink)	LEO	SpaceX	Success	Success (OCISLY)
311	Launch of 20 Starlink v2 mini satellites to a 525 km (326 mi) orbit at an inclination of 53° to expand internet constellation and two SpaceX Starshield satellites as rideshare.								
312	March 21, 2024; 20:55	F9 B5; B1080‑6	Cape Canaveral, SLC‑40	SpaceX CRS-30 (Dragon C209-4)	2,721 kg (5,999 lb)	LEO (ISS)	NASA (CRS)	Success	Success (LZ‑1)
312	Six additional CRS-2 missions for Dragon 2 were announced in March 2022, resupplying the ISS until 2026. First launch of Dragon 2 from SLC-40.								
313	March 24, 2024; 03:09	F9 B5; B1060‑19	Kennedy, LC‑39A	Starlink: Group 6-42 (23 satellites)	~17,100 kg (37,700 lb)	LEO	SpaceX	Success	Success (JRTI)
313	Launch of 23 Starlink v2 mini satellites to a 530 km (330 mi) orbit at an inclination of 43° to expand internet constellation.								
314	March 25, 2024; 23:42	F9 B5; B1078‑8	Cape Canaveral, SLC‑40	Starlink: Group 6-46 (23 satellites)	~17,100 kg (37,700 lb)	LEO	SpaceX	Success	Success (ASOG)
314	Launch of 23 Starlink v2 mini satellites to a 530 km (330 mi) orbit at an inclination of 43° to expand internet constellation. Least time taken between landing and port's arrival at 50 hours and fastest turnaround of a pad switching from Dragon to Fairing mission, that was completed in 4 days.								
315	March 30, 2024; 21:52	F9 B5; B1076‑12	Kennedy, LC‑39A	Eutelsat 36D	5,000 kg (11,000 lb)	GTO	Eutelsat	Success	Success (JRTI)
315	Television broadcast satellite. First time SpaceX completed 11 Falcon launches in a calendar month.								
316	March 31, 2024; 01:30	F9 B5; B1067‑18	Cape Canaveral, SLC‑40	Starlink: Group 6-45 (23 satellites)	~17,100 kg (37,700 lb)	LEO	SpaceX	Success	Success (ASOG)
316	Launch of 23 Starlink v2 mini satellites to a 530 km (330 mi) orbit at an inclination of 43° to expand internet constellation. This marks the first time SpaceX has completed 12 Falcon launches in a calendar month.								

=== April ===
Flight No.	Date and time (UTC)	Version, booster	Launch site	Payload	Payload mass	Orbit	Customer	Launch outcome	Booster landing
317	April 2, 2024; 02:30	F9 B5; B1071‑15	Vandenberg, SLC‑4E	Starlink: Group 7-18 (22 satellites)	~16,700 kg (36,800 lb)	LEO	SpaceX	Success	Success (OCISLY)
317	Launch of 22 Starlink v2 mini satellites to a 525 km (326 mi) orbit at an inclination of 53° to expand internet constellation.								
318	April 5, 2024; 09:12	F9 B5; B1069‑14	Cape Canaveral, SLC‑40	Starlink: Group 6-47 (23 satellites)	~17,100 kg (37,700 lb)	LEO	SpaceX	Success	Success (ASOG)
318	Launch of 23 Starlink v2 mini satellites to a 530 km (330 mi) orbit at an inclination of 43° to expand internet constellation.								
319	April 7, 2024; 02:25	F9 B5; B1081‑6	Vandenberg, SLC‑4E	Starlink: Group 8-1 (21 satellites)	~16,800 kg (37,000 lb)	LEO	SpaceX	Success	Success (OCISLY)
319	Launch of 21 Starlink v2 mini satellites, including six with direct-to-cell connectivity, to a 535 km (332 mi) orbit at an inclination of 53° to expand internet constellation.								
320	April 7, 2024; 23:16	F9 B5; B1073‑14	Kennedy, LC‑39A	Bandwagon-1 (11 payload smallsat rideshare) 425 Project Flight 2	Unknown	LEO	Various Republic of Korea Armed Forces	Success	Success (LZ‑1)
320	Dedicated SmallSat Rideshare mission to 45° inclination, 550–600 km (340–370 mi) altitude. The mission includes flight 2 of 425 Project, a military SAR satellite of South Korea with a mass of ~800 kg (1,800 lb).								
321	April 10, 2024; 05:40	F9 B5; B1083‑2	Cape Canaveral, SLC‑40	Starlink: Group 6-48 (23 satellites)	~17,100 kg (37,700 lb)	LEO	SpaceX	Success	Success (JRTI)
321	Launch of 23 Starlink v2 mini satellites to a 530 km (330 mi) orbit at an inclination of 43° to expand internet constellation. 1st time flying a fairing half for the 17th time.								
322	April 11, 2024; 14:25	F9 B5; B1082‑3	Vandenberg, SLC‑4E	USSF-62 (WSF-M 1)	1,200 kg (2,600 lb)	SSO	USSF	Success	Success (LZ‑4)
322	Launch part of Phase 2 US Space Force contract awarded in 2022. This was the first launch of the Weather System Follow-on Microwave weather satellite, which replaced the aging Defense Meteorological Satellite Program satellites.								
323	April 13, 2024; 01:40	F9 B5; B1062‑20	Cape Canaveral, SLC‑40	Starlink: Group 6-49 (23 satellites)	~17,100 kg (37,700 lb)	LEO	SpaceX	Success	Success (ASOG)
323	Launch of 23 Starlink v2 mini satellites to a 530 km (330 mi) orbit at an inclination of 43° to expand internet constellation. First booster to fly for the 20th time, new record.								
324	April 17, 2024; 21:26	F9 B5; B1077‑12	Kennedy, LC‑39A	Starlink: Group 6-51 (23 satellites)	~17,100 kg (37,700 lb)	LEO	SpaceX	Success	Success (JRTI)
324	Launch of 23 Starlink v2 mini satellites to a 530 km (330 mi) orbit at an inclination of 43° to expand internet constellation.								
325	April 18, 2024; 22:40	F9 B5; B1080‑7	Cape Canaveral, SLC‑40	Starlink: Group 6-52 (23 satellites)	~17,100 kg (37,700 lb)	LEO	SpaceX	Success	Success (ASOG)
325	Launch of 23 Starlink v2 mini satellites to a 530 km (330 mi) orbit at an inclination of 43° to expand internet constellation.								
326	April 23, 2024; 22:17	F9 B5; B1078‑9	Cape Canaveral, SLC‑40	Starlink: Group 6-53 (23 satellites)	~17,100 kg (37,700 lb)	LEO	SpaceX	Success	Success (JRTI)
326	Launch of 23 Starlink v2 mini satellites to a 530 km (330 mi) orbit at an inclination of 43° to expand internet constellation. 300th Falcon booster landing, including both Falcon 9 and Falcon Heavy boosters.								
327	April 28, 2024; 00:34	F9 B5; B1060‑20	Kennedy, LC‑39A	Galileo-L12 (FOC FM25 & FM27)	1,600 kg (3,500 lb)	MEO	ESA	Success	No attempt
327	First Galileo satellites booked on a US rocket following delays to the European Ariane 6 program. The booster was expended on this mission due to the performance needed to get the payload to the desired 23,616 km orbit.								
328	April 28, 2024; 22:08	F9 B5; B1076‑13	Cape Canaveral, SLC‑40	Starlink: Group 6-54 (23 satellites)	~17,100 kg (37,700 lb)	LEO	SpaceX	Success	Success (JRTI)
328	Launch of 23 Starlink v2 mini satellites to a 530 km (330 mi) orbit at an inclination of 43° to expand internet constellation. 300th consecutive successful Falcon 9 launch.								

=== May ===
Flight No.	Date and time (UTC)	Version, booster	Launch site	Payload	Payload mass	Orbit	Customer	Launch outcome	Booster landing
329	May 2, 2024; 18:36	F9 B5; B1061‑20	Vandenberg, SLC‑4E	WorldView Legion 1 & 2	1,500 kg (3,300 lb)	SSO	Maxar Technologies	Success	Success (LZ‑4)
329	Two Maxar Technologies satellites built by subsidiary SSL for subsidiary DigitalGlobe. Ninth flight with short nozzle second stage aimed at lowering costs and improving launch cadence, but is only suitable for missions with lower performance requirements.								
330	May 3, 2024; 02:37	F9 B5; B1067‑19	Cape Canaveral, SLC‑40	Starlink: Group 6-55 (23 satellites)	~17,100 kg (37,700 lb)	LEO	SpaceX	Success	Success (ASOG)
330	Launch of 23 Starlink v2 mini satellites to a 530 km (330 mi) orbit at an inclination of 43° to expand internet constellation. 1st time flying a fairing half for the 18th time.								
331	May 6, 2024; 18:14	F9 B5; B1069‑15	Cape Canaveral, SLC‑40	Starlink: Group 6-57 (23 satellites)	~17,100 kg (37,700 lb)	LEO	SpaceX	Success	Success (JRTI)
331	Launch of 23 Starlink v2 mini satellites to a 530 km (330 mi) orbit at an inclination of 43° to expand internet constellation.								
332	May 8, 2024; 18:42	F9 B5; B1083‑3	Kennedy, LC‑39A	Starlink: Group 6-56 (23 satellites)	~17,100 kg (37,700 lb)	LEO	SpaceX	Success	Success (ASOG)
332	Launch of 23 Starlink v2 mini satellites to a 530 km (330 mi) orbit at an inclination of 43° to expand internet constellation.								
333	May 10, 2024; 04:30	F9 B5; B1082‑4	Vandenberg, SLC‑4E	Starlink: Group 8-2 (20 satellites)	~16,300 kg (35,900 lb)	LEO	SpaceX	Success	Success (OCISLY)
333	Launch of 20 Starlink v2 mini satellites, including 13 with direct-to-cell connectivity, to a 535 km (332 mi) orbit at an inclination of 53° to expand internet constellation.								
334	May 13, 2024; 00:53	F9 B5; B1073‑15	Cape Canaveral, SLC‑40	Starlink: Group 6-58 (23 satellites)	~17,100 kg (37,700 lb)	LEO	SpaceX	Success	Success (ASOG)
334	Launch of 23 Starlink v2 mini satellites to a 530 km (330 mi) orbit at an inclination of 43° to expand internet constellation.								
335	May 14, 2024; 18:39	F9 B5; B1063‑18	Vandenberg, SLC‑4E	Starlink: Group 8-7 (20 satellites)	~16,300 kg (35,900 lb)	LEO	SpaceX	Success	Success (OCISLY)
335	Launch of 20 Starlink v2 mini satellites, including 13 with direct-to-cell connectivity, to a 535 km (332 mi) orbit at an inclination of 53° to expand internet constellation.								
336	May 18, 2024; 00:32	F9 B5; B1062‑21	Cape Canaveral, SLC‑40	Starlink: Group 6-59 (23 satellites)	~17,100 kg (37,700 lb)	LEO	SpaceX	Success	Success (ASOG)
336	Launch of 23 Starlink v2 mini satellites to a 530 km (330 mi) orbit at an inclination of 43° to expand internet constellation. First booster to fly for the 21st time, new record.								
337	May 22, 2024; 08:00	F9 B5; B1071‑16	Vandenberg, SLC‑4E	NROL-146 (21 Starshield satellites)	Unknown	SSO	Northrop Grumman/NRO	Success	Success (OCISLY)
337	The first launch of SpaceX/Northrop built Starshield satellites for the National Reconnaissance Office.								
338	May 23, 2024; 02:35	F9 B5; B1080‑8	Cape Canaveral, SLC‑40	Starlink: Group 6-62 (23 satellites)	~17,100 kg (37,700 lb)	LEO	SpaceX	Success	Success (ASOG)
338	Launch of 23 Starlink v2 mini satellites to a 530 km (330 mi) orbit at an inclination of 43° to expand internet constellation.								
339	May 24, 2024; 02:45	F9 B5; B1077‑13	Kennedy, LC‑39A	Starlink: Group 6-63 (23 satellites)	~17,100 kg (37,700 lb)	LEO	SpaceX	Success	Success (JRTI)
339	Launch of 23 Starlink v2 mini satellites to a 530 km (330 mi) orbit at an inclination of 43° to expand internet constellation. 1st time flying a fairing half for the 19th time.								
340	May 28, 2024; 14:24	F9 B5; B1078‑10	Cape Canaveral, SLC‑40	Starlink: Group 6-60 (23 satellites)	~17,100 kg (37,700 lb)	LEO	SpaceX	Success	Success (ASOG)
340	Launch of 23 Starlink v2 mini satellites to a 559 km (347 mi) orbit at an inclination of 43° to expand internet constellation.								
341	May 28, 2024; 22:20	F9 B5; B1081‑7	Vandenberg, SLC‑4E	EarthCARE	2,350 kg (5,180 lb)	SSO	ESA	Success	Success (LZ‑4)
341	EarthCARE (Cloud, Aerosol and Radiation Explorer) satellite was the sixth mission in ESA's Earth Explorer program. Tenth flight with short nozzle second stage aimed at lowering costs and improving launch cadence, but is only suitable for missions with lower performance requirements. This marked the first time SpaceX has completed 13 Falcon launches in a calendar month.								

=== June ===
Flight No.	Date and time (UTC)	Version, booster	Launch site	Payload	Payload mass	Orbit	Customer	Launch outcome	Booster landing
342	June 1, 2024; 02:37	F9 B5; B1076‑14	Cape Canaveral, SLC‑40	Starlink: Group 6-64 (23 satellites)	~17,100 kg (37,700 lb)	LEO	SpaceX	Success	Success (ASOG)
342	Launch of 23 Starlink v2 mini satellites to a 559 km (347 mi) orbit at an inclination of 43° to expand internet constellation. Fastest landing-to-landing turnaround of a drone ship, with A Shortfall of Gravitas having serviced the previous Starlink launch only 3 days, 12 hours prior. First time SpaceX has completed 14 Falcon launches in a calendar month (the launch took place on the evening of May 31 local time).								
343	June 5, 2024; 02:16	F9 B5; B1067‑20	Cape Canaveral, SLC‑40	Starlink: Group 8-5 (20 satellites)	~16,300 kg (35,900 lb)	LEO	SpaceX	Success	Success (JRTI)
343	Launch of 20 Starlink v2 mini satellites, including 13 with direct-to-cell connectivity, to a 535 km (332 mi) orbit at an inclination of 53° to expand internet constellation.								
344	June 8, 2024; 01:56	F9 B5; B1069‑16	Cape Canaveral, SLC‑40	Starlink: Group 10-1 (22 satellites)	~16,700 kg (36,800 lb)	LEO	SpaceX	Success	Success (ASOG)
344	Launch of 22 Starlink v2 mini satellites to a 279 km (173 mi) orbit at an inclination of 53° to expand internet constellation. 300th Falcon 9 booster landing.								
345	June 8, 2024; 12:58	F9 B5; B1061‑21	Vandenberg, SLC‑4E	Starlink: Group 8-8 (20 satellites)	~16,300 kg (35,900 lb)	LEO	SpaceX	Success	Success (OCISLY)
345	Launch of 20 Starlink v2 mini satellites, including 13 with direct-to-cell connectivity, to a 535 km (332 mi) orbit at an inclination of 53° to expand internet constellation. Second booster to fly for the 21st time.								
346	June 19, 2024; 03:40	F9 B5; B1082‑5	Vandenberg, SLC‑4E	Starlink: Group 9-1 (20 satellites)	~16,300 kg (35,900 lb)	LEO	SpaceX	Success	Success (OCISLY)
346	Launch of 20 Starlink v2 mini satellites, including 13 with direct-to-cell connectivity, to a 535 km (332 mi) orbit at an inclination of 53° to expand internet constellation.								
347	June 20, 2024; 21:35	F9 B5; B1080‑9	Cape Canaveral, SLC‑40	Astra 1P	5,000 kg (11,000 lb)	GTO	SES	Success	Success (JRTI)
347	A SES satellite serving major broadcasters across Europe.								
348	June 23, 2024; 17:15	F9 B5; B1078‑11	Cape Canaveral, SLC‑40	Starlink: Group 10-2 (22 satellites)	~16,700 kg (36,800 lb)	LEO	SpaceX	Success	Success (ASOG)
348	Launch of 22 Starlink v2 mini satellites to a 279 km (173 mi) orbit at an inclination of 53° to expand internet constellation. A launch attempt on June 14 was scrubbed when B1073 commanded an abort seconds after engine ignition. The payload and second stage were moved to B1078 for launch. 1st time flying a fairing half for the 20th time.								
349	June 24, 2024; 03:47	F9 B5; B1075‑11	Vandenberg, SLC‑4E	Starlink: Group 9-2 (20 satellites)	~16,300 kg (35,900 lb)	LEO	SpaceX	Success	Success (OCISLY)
349	Launch of 20 Starlink v2 mini satellites, including 13 with direct-to-cell connectivity, to a 535 km (332 mi) orbit at an inclination of 53° to expand internet constellation.								
FH 10	June 25, 2024; 21:26	Falcon Heavy B5; B1087 (core)	Kennedy, LC‑39A	GOES-U (GOES-19)	5,000 kg (11,000 lb)	GTO	NOAA	Success	No attempt
FH 10	June 25, 2024; 21:26	B1072‑1 (side)	Kennedy, LC‑39A	GOES-U (GOES-19)	5,000 kg (11,000 lb)	GTO	NOAA	Success	Success (LZ‑1)
FH 10	June 25, 2024; 21:26	B1086‑1 (side)	Kennedy, LC‑39A	GOES-U (GOES-19)	5,000 kg (11,000 lb)	GTO	NOAA	Success	Success (LZ‑2)
FH 10	In September 2021, NASA awarded SpaceX a $152.5 million contract to provide launch services for the GOES-U weather satellite (renamed as GOES-19 after reaching geostationary orbit). Fourth time a second stage featured Falcon medium coast mission-extension kit. Center core expended as side boosters landed on LZ-1 and 2.								
350	June 27, 2024; 11:14	F9 B5; B1062‑22	Cape Canaveral, SLC‑40	Starlink: Group 10-3 (23 satellites)	~17,100 kg (37,700 lb)	LEO	SpaceX	Success	Success (JRTI)
350	Launch of 23 Starlink v2 mini satellites to a 279 km (173 mi) orbit at an inclination of 53° to expand internet constellation. First booster to fly for the 22nd time, new record.								
351	June 29, 2024; 03:14	F9 B5; B1081‑8	Vandenberg, SLC‑4E	NROL-186 (~21 Starshield satellites)	Unknown	SSO	NRO	Success	Success (OCISLY)
351	The second launch of SpaceX/Northrop Grumman built Starshield satellites for the National Reconnaissance Office.								

=== July ===
Flight No.	Date and time (UTC)	Version, booster	Launch site	Payload	Payload mass	Orbit	Customer	Launch outcome	Booster landing
352	July 3, 2024; 08:55	F9 B5; B1073‑16	Cape Canaveral, SLC‑40	Starlink: Group 8-9 (20 satellites)	~16,300 kg (35,900 lb)	LEO	SpaceX	Success	Success (ASOG)
352	Launch of 20 Starlink v2 mini satellites, including 13 with direct-to-cell connectivity, to a 535 km (332 mi) orbit at an inclination of 53° to expand internet constellation. 100th Starlink satellite launched with direct-to-cell connectivity.								
353	July 8, 2024; 23:30	F9 B5; B1076‑15	Cape Canaveral, SLC‑40	Türksat 6A	4,250 kg (9,370 lb)	GTO	Türksat	Success	Success (JRTI)
353	First domestically produced Turkish communications satellite.								
354	July 12, 2024; 02:35	F9 B5; B1063‑19	Vandenberg, SLC‑4E	Starlink: Group 9-3 (20 satellites)	~16,300 kg (35,900 lb)	LEO	SpaceX	Failure	Success (OCISLY)
354	Launch of 20 Starlink v2 mini satellites, including 13 with direct-to-cell connectivity, that failed to reach the target orbit. The mission experienced a failure of its second stage. While the initial burn proceeded as planned, a subsequent liquid oxygen leak led to engine disintegration during a planned second burn. All starlink satellites were deployed, but without the additional burn, all Starlink satellites were lost due to atmospheric drag. The incident marked the first Falcon 9 Block 5 failure since its introduction, ending a streak of 325 consecutive successful Falcon 9 launches following the pre-flight anomaly of AMOS-6. The FAA initiated a SpaceX-performed mishap investigation, halting Falcon 9 launches until concluding that no public safety risks were present. The rocket was cleared to resume flight on July 25, 2024, though the overall investigation remained open.								
355	July 27, 2024; 05:45	F9 B5; B1069‑17	Kennedy, LC‑39A	Starlink: Group 10-9 (23 satellites)	~17,100 kg (37,700 lb)	LEO	SpaceX	Success	Success (JRTI)
355	Launch of 23 Starlink v2 mini satellites to a 279 km (173 mi) orbit at an inclination of 53° to expand internet constellation. Return-to-flight mission.								
356	July 28, 2024; 05:09	F9 B5; B1077‑14	Cape Canaveral, SLC‑40	Starlink: Group 10-4 (23 satellites)	~17,100 kg (37,700 lb)	LEO	SpaceX	Success	Success (ASOG)
356	Launch of 23 Starlink v2 mini satellites to a 279 km (173 mi) orbit at an inclination of 53° to expand internet constellation. 300th Falcon first-stage reflight.								
357	July 28, 2024; 09:22	F9 B5; B1071‑17	Vandenberg, SLC‑4E	Starlink: Group 9-4 (21 satellites)	~16,500 kg (36,400 lb)	LEO	SpaceX	Success	Success (OCISLY)
357	Launch of 21 Starlink v2 mini satellites, including 13 with direct-to-cell connectivity, to a 535 km (332 mi) orbit at an inclination of 53° to expand internet constellation.								

=== August ===
Flight No.	Date and time (UTC)	Version, booster	Launch site	Payload	Payload mass	Orbit	Customer	Launch outcome	Booster landing
358	August 2, 2024; 05:01	F9 B5; B1078‑12	Kennedy, LC‑39A	Starlink: Group 10-6 (23 satellites)	~17,100 kg (37,700 lb)	LEO	SpaceX	Success	Success (ASOG)
358	Launch of 23 Starlink v2 mini satellites to a 279 km (173 mi) orbit at an inclination of 53° to expand internet constellation.								
359	August 4, 2024; 07:24	F9 B5; B1082‑6	Vandenberg, SLC‑4E	Starlink: Group 11-1 (23 satellites)	~17,100 kg (37,700 lb)	LEO	SpaceX	Success	Success (OCISLY)
359	Launch of 23 Starlink v2 mini satellites to a 535 km (332 mi) orbit at an inclination of 53° to expand internet constellation.								
360	August 4, 2024; 15:02	F9 B5; B1080‑10	Cape Canaveral, SLC‑40	CRS NG-21 (S.S. Francis R. "Dick" Scobee)	3,857 kg (8,503 lb)	LEO (ISS)	Northrop Grumman (CRS)	Success	Success (LZ‑1)
360	Second of four launches Northrop Grumman acquired from SpaceX while a replacement rocket stage is developed for its Antares rocket. Unmanned Enhanced Cygnus cargo spacecraft named in honor of Francis R. "Dick" Scobee. Eleventh flight with short nozzle second stage aimed at lowering costs and improving launch cadence, but is only suitable for missions with lower performance requirements.								
361	August 10, 2024; 12:50	F9 B5; B1067‑21	Cape Canaveral, SLC‑40	Starlink: Group 8-3 (21 satellites)	~16,500 kg (36,400 lb)	LEO	SpaceX	Success	Success (JRTI)
361	Launch of 21 Starlink v2 mini satellites, including 13 with direct-to-cell connectivity, to a 535 km (332 mi) orbit at an inclination of 53° to expand internet constellation.								
362	August 12, 2024; 02:02	F9 B5; B1061‑22	Vandenberg, SLC‑4E	ASBM 1 (GX 10A) & ASBM 2 (GX 10B)	~7,230 kg (15,940 lb)	Molniya	Space Norway	Success	Success (OCISLY)
362	Space Norway launched two satellites built by Inmarsat for the Arctic Satellite Broadband Mission (ASBM) system into highly elliptical Molniya transfer orbits (apogee: 43,509 km (27,035 mi), perigee: 8,089 km (5,026 mi), 63.4° inclination) to provide communication coverage to high latitudes not served by geosynchronous satellites. Second booster to fly for the 22nd time.								
363	August 12, 2024; 10:37	F9 B5; B1073‑17	Kennedy, LC‑39A	Starlink: Group 10-7 (23 satellites)	~17,100 kg (37,700 lb)	LEO	SpaceX	Success	Success (ASOG)
363	Launch of 23 Starlink v2 mini satellites to a 279 km (173 mi) orbit at an inclination of 53° to expand internet constellation.								
364	August 15, 2024; 13:00	F9 B5; B1076‑16	Cape Canaveral, SLC‑40	WorldView Legion 3 & 4	1,500 kg (3,300 lb)	LEO	Maxar Technologies	Success	Success (LZ‑1)
364	Maxar Technologies built satellites.								
365	August 16, 2024; 18:56	F9 B5; B1075‑12	Vandenberg, SLC-4E	Transporter-11 (116 payload smallsat rideshare)	Unknown	SSO	Various	Success	Success (LZ‑4)
365	Dedicated SmallSat Rideshare mission to sun-synchronous orbit. Fifth time a second stage featured Falcon medium coast mission-extension kit.								
366	August 20, 2024; 13:20	F9 B5; B1085‑1	Cape Canaveral, SLC‑40	Starlink: Group 10-5 (23 satellites)	~16,700 kg (36,800 lb)	LEO	SpaceX	Success	Success (ASOG)
366	Launch of 23 Starlink v2 mini satellites to a 279 km (173 mi) orbit at an inclination of 53° to expand internet constellation.								
367	August 28, 2024; 07:48	F9 B5; B1062‑23	Cape Canaveral, SLC‑40	Starlink: Group 8-6 (21 satellites)	~16,700 kg (36,800 lb)	LEO	SpaceX	Success	Failure (ASOG)
367	Launch of 21 Starlink v2 mini-satellites, including 13 with direct-to-cell connectivity, to a 535 km (332 mi) orbit at an inclination of 53° to expand internet constellation. The booster was making its 23rd flight, a new record. The booster caught fire during the touchdown, immediately tipped over, and was destroyed. This marked the first landing failure in over three years, ending a streak of 267 successful landings and the first failure on the A Shortfall of Gravitas platform. The FAA required SpaceX to investigate the landing failure. On Aug 30, the FAA approved the request for SpaceX to return Falcon 9 to launch.								
368	August 31, 2024; 07:43	F9 B5; B1069‑18	Cape Canaveral, SLC‑40	Starlink: Group 8-10 (21 satellites)	~16,700 kg (36,800 lb)	LEO	SpaceX	Success	Success (JRTI)
368	Launch of 21 Starlink v2 mini satellites, including 13 with direct-to-cell connectivity, to a 535 km (332 mi) orbit at an inclination of 53° to expand internet constellation.								
369	August 31, 2024; 08:48	F9 B5; B1081‑9	Vandenberg, SLC-4E	Starlink: Group 9-5 (21 satellites)	~16,700 kg (36,800 lb)	LEO	SpaceX	Success	Success (OCISLY)
369	Launch of 21 Starlink v2 mini satellites, including 13 with direct-to-cell connectivity, to a 535 km (332 mi) orbit at an inclination of 53° to expand internet constellation. SpaceX set a new record for the shortest time between two Falcon launches at 1 hour and 5 minutes. The previous record time was 1 hours and 51 minutes, set between the Transporter-10 and Starlink Group 6–41 missions on March 4, 2024.								

=== September ===
Flight No.	Date and time (UTC)	Version, booster	Launch site	Payload	Payload mass	Orbit	Customer	Launch outcome	Booster landing
370	September 5, 2024; 15:33	F9 B5; B1077‑15	Cape Canaveral, SLC‑40	Starlink: Group 8-11 (21 satellites)	~16,700 kg (36,800 lb)	LEO	SpaceX	Success	Success (JRTI)
370	Launch of 21 Starlink v2 mini satellites, including 13 with direct-to-cell connectivity, to a 535 km (332 mi) orbit at an inclination of 53° to expand internet constellation.								
371	September 6, 2024; 03:20	F9 B5; B1063‑20	Vandenberg, SLC‑4E	NROL-113 (21 Starshield satellites)	Unknown	LEO	NRO	Success	Success (OCISLY)
371	Launch of 21 Starshield satellites to 70° inclination orbit. Third launch of SpaceX/Northrop Grumman-built Starshield satellites for the National Reconnaissance Office. Launch marked the 100th successful landing on the Of Course I Still Love You droneship.								
372	September 10, 2024; 09:23	F9 B5; B1083‑4	Kennedy, LC‑39A	Polaris Dawn (Crew Dragon C207-3 Resilience)	~13,000 kg (29,000 lb)	LEO	Polaris Program	Success	Success (JRTI)
372	First of two Crew Dragon missions for the Polaris Program. The rocket launched Crew Dragon with Jared Isaacman, Scott Poteet, Sarah Gillis and Anna Menon into an elliptic orbit, reaching an altitude of 1,400 kilometers (870 mi); the farthest anyone has been from Earth since NASA's Apollo program. During the five-day mission, Isaacman and Gillis performed the first commercial spacewalk. The mission was also the first test of Dragon's laser interlink communication via Starlink. Resilience has been modified extensively for this mission.								
373	September 12, 2024; 08:52	F9 B5; B1078‑13	Cape Canaveral, SLC‑40	BlueBird Block 1 (5 satellites)	7,500 kg (16,500 lb)	LEO	AST SpaceMobile	Success	Success (LZ‑1)
373	Cellphone-compatible broadband constellation. Each satellite is a similar size and weight to its 1,500-kilogram (3,300 lb) BlueWalker 3 prototype and have a 64-square-meter (690 sq ft) phased array antenna.								
374	September 13, 2024; 01:45	F9 B5; B1071‑18	Vandenberg, SLC-4E	Starlink: Group 9-6 (21 satellites)	~16,700 kg (36,800 lb)	LEO	SpaceX	Success	Success (OCISLY)
374	Launch of 21 Starlink v2 mini satellites, including 13 with direct-to-cell connectivity, to a 535 km (332 mi) orbit at an inclination of 53° to expand internet constellation.								
375	September 17, 2024; 22:50	F9 B5; B1067‑22	Cape Canaveral, SLC‑40	Galileo-L13 (FOC FM26 & FM32)	1,600 kg (3,500 lb)	MEO	ESA	Success	Success (JRTI)
375	Second and last launch of Galileo navigation satellites on Falcon 9. Originally planned to launch on Soyuz, but canceled after the Russian invasion of Ukraine. Launch was shifted to the new Ariane 6 rocket, but the program was delayed. On the previous Galileo launch, the booster was expended due to a lack of fuel for a landing. However, that launch provided data that allowed SpaceX to make design and operational changes to recover the booster on this launch. The company said this landing attempt would test the bounds of recovery.								
376	September 20, 2024; 13:50	F9 B5; B1075‑13	Vandenberg, SLC-4E	Starlink: Group 9-17 (20 satellites)	~16,300 kg (35,900 lb)	LEO	SpaceX	Success	Success (OCISLY)
376	Launch of 20 Starlink v2 mini satellites, including 13 with direct-to-cell connectivity, to a 535 km (332 mi) orbit at an inclination of 53° to expand internet constellation.								
377	September 25, 2024; 04:01	F9 B5; B1081‑10	Vandenberg, SLC-4E	Starlink: Group 9-8 (20 satellites)	~16,300 kg (35,900 lb)	LEO	SpaceX	Success	Success (OCISLY)
377	Launch of 20 Starlink v2 mini satellites, including 13 with direct-to-cell connectivity, to a 535 km (332 mi) orbit at an inclination of 53° to expand internet constellation.								
378	September 28, 2024; 17:17	F9 B5; B1085‑2	Cape Canaveral, SLC‑40	Crew-9 (Crew Dragon C212-4 Freedom)	~13,000 kg (29,000 lb)	LEO (ISS)	NASA (CTS)	Success	Success (LZ‑1)
378	Long-duration mission to the International Space Station (ISS). First crewed mission to launch from SLC-40. The launch carried two members of the Expedition 72 crew, Nick Hague and Aleksandr Gorbunov, along with a small amount of cargo to the ISS. Due to technical issues with the Boeing Starliner Calypso the crew complement of the launch was reduced down to two and Barry E. Wilmore and Sunita Williams, the crew of the Boeing Crew Flight Test, joined the Crew-9 and Expedition 72 crew complement. The second stage experienced an off-nominal deorbit burn that ran for an extra 500 milliseconds, and while it landed safely in the ocean, it landed short of the targeted area. SpaceX said they would temporarily halt launches while time was spent understanding the root cause. Several days later the FAA said they would require an investigation into the failure before issuing a return to flight for the Falcon 9. It marked the third time in a span of three months that the Falcon 9 suffered an anomaly temporarily stopping launches. On October 11, the FAA approved the Falcon 9 to return to flight for low-Earth orbit missions, after granting approval for the Hera launch due to its heliocentric orbit.								

=== October ===
Flight No.	Date and time (UTC)	Version, booster	Launch site	Payload	Payload mass	Orbit	Customer	Launch outcome	Booster landing
379	October 7, 2024; 14:52	F9 B5; B1061‑23	Cape Canaveral, SLC‑40	Hera	1,108 kg (2,443 lb)	Heliocentric	ESA	Success	No attempt
379	Hera is a European Space Agency mission under its Space Safety program. Its primary goal is to study the aftermath of NASA's DART mission, which intentionally collided with the Didymos binary asteroid system. By analyzing the crater formed and the momentum transferred during the impact, Hera will help validate the kinetic impact method as a potential strategy for deflecting a near-Earth asteroid on a collision course with Earth. The mission will provide data on the efficiency of this technique. It also carries two nano-satellite CubeSats, called Milani and Juventas. This was the second booster to complete its 23rd flight. Although the Falcon 9 remained unable to launch following the Crew-9 mishap, the FAA granted an exemption for the Hera launch, as it did not involve a second-stage reentry. First stage was expended because all of its performance were needed to go to the heliocentric orbit.								
FH 11	October 14, 2024; 16:06	Falcon Heavy B5; B1089 (core)	Kennedy, LC‑39A	Europa Clipper	6,065 kg (13,371 lb)	Heliocentric	NASA	Success	No attempt
FH 11	October 14, 2024; 16:06	B1064‑6 (side)	Kennedy, LC‑39A	Europa Clipper	6,065 kg (13,371 lb)	Heliocentric	NASA	Success	No attempt
FH 11	October 14, 2024; 16:06	B1065‑6 (side)	Kennedy, LC‑39A	Europa Clipper	6,065 kg (13,371 lb)	Heliocentric	NASA	Success	No attempt
FH 11	Europa Clipper will conduct a detailed survey of Europa and use a sophisticated suite of science instruments to investigate whether the icy moon has conditions suitable for life. Key mission objectives are to produce high-resolution images of Europa's surface, determine its composition, look for signs of recent or ongoing geological activity, measure the thickness of the moon's icy shell, search for subsurface lakes, and determine the depth and salinity of Europa's ocean. The spacecraft will fly past Mars and Earth before arriving at Jupiter in April 2030. At 45,648 km/h (28,364 mph) the launch had the highest-speed payload injection ever achieved by SpaceX, however to reach that speed, the core and side boosters were expended without grid fins and landing legs.								
380	October 15, 2024; 06:10	F9 B5; B1080‑11	Cape Canaveral, SLC‑40	Starlink: Group 10-10 (23 satellites)	~17,100 kg (37,700 lb)	LEO	SpaceX	Success	Success (ASOG)
380	Launch of 23 Starlink v2 mini satellites to a 279 km (173 mi) orbit at an inclination of 53° to expand internet constellation. This was the 100th SpaceX launch this year, a first by any launch agency in a particular calendar year.								
381	October 15, 2024; 08:21	F9 B5; B1071‑19	Vandenberg, SLC-4E	Starlink: Group 9-7 (20 satellites)	~16,300 kg (35,900 lb)	LEO	SpaceX	Success	Success (OCISLY)
381	Launch of 20 Starlink v2 mini satellites, including 13 with direct-to-cell connectivity, to a 535 km (332 mi) orbit at an inclination of 53° to expand internet constellation.								
382	October 18, 2024; 23:31	F9 B5; B1076‑17	Cape Canaveral, SLC‑40	Starlink: Group 8-19 (20 satellites)	~16,300 kg (35,900 lb)	LEO	SpaceX	Success	Success (JRTI)
382	Launch of 20 Starlink v2 mini satellites, including 13 with direct-to-cell connectivity to a 535 km (332 mi) orbit at an inclination of 53° to expand internet constellation. With this launch, SpaceX's Falcon family surpassed the yearly world record for most launches attempted, previously set by themselves last year.								
383	October 20, 2024; 05:13	F9 B5; B1082‑7	Vandenberg, SLC-4E	OneWeb #20 (20 satellites)	2,954 kg (6,512 lb)	Polar LEO	OneWeb	Success	Success (LZ‑4)
383	Launch of 20 OneWeb satellites to expand internet constellation. 12th flight with short nozzle second stage. This was the 100th Falcon launch this year, the first by any rocket family in a particular calendar year. Moreover, with this launch, SpaceX's Falcon family surpassed the yearly world record for most successful launches, previously set by themselves last year.								
384	October 23, 2024; 21:47	F9 B5; B1073‑18	Cape Canaveral, SLC‑40	Starlink: Group 6-61 (23 satellites)	~17,100 kg (37,700 lb)	LEO	SpaceX	Success	Success (ASOG)
384	Launch of 23 Starlink v2 mini satellites to a 559 km (347 mi) orbit at an inclination of 43° to expand internet constellation. This was the 100th Falcon launch attempt this year.								
385	October 24, 2024; 17:13	F9 B5; B1063‑21	Vandenberg, SLC-4E	NROL-167 (~17 Starshield satellites)	Unknown	LEO	NRO	Success	Success (OCISLY)
385	Fourth launch of SpaceX/Northrop Grumman-built Starshield satellites for the National Reconnaissance Office. This was the 100th successful Falcon 9 launch this year, a record.								
386	October 26, 2024; 21:47	F9 B5; B1069‑19	Cape Canaveral, SLC‑40	Starlink: Group 10-8 (22 satellites)	~16,700 kg (36,800 lb)	LEO	SpaceX	Success	Success (JRTI)
386	Launch of 22 Starlink v2 mini satellites to a 279 km (173 mi) orbit at an inclination of 53° to expand internet constellation. 100th successful Falcon 9 booster landing in 2024, a record.								
387	October 30, 2024; 12:07	F9 B5; B1075‑14	Vandenberg, SLC-4E	Starlink: Group 9-9 (20 satellites)	~16,300 kg (35,900 lb)	LEO	SpaceX	Success	Success (OCISLY)
387	Launch of 20 Starlink v2 mini satellites, including 13 with direct-to-cell connectivity, to a 535 km (332 mi) orbit at an inclination of 53° to expand internet constellation. 200th launch of dedicated starlink missions.								
388	October 30, 2024; 21:10	F9 B5; B1078‑14	Cape Canaveral, SLC‑40	Starlink: Group 10-13 (23 satellites)	~17,100 kg (37,700 lb)	LEO	SpaceX	Success	Success (ASOG)
388	Launch of 23 Starlink v2 mini satellites to a 279 km (173 mi) orbit at an inclination of 53° to expand internet constellation.								

=== November ===
Flight No.	Date and time (UTC)	Version, booster	Launch site	Payload	Payload mass	Orbit	Customer	Launch outcome	Booster landing
389	November 5, 2024; 02:29	F9 B5; B1083‑5	Kennedy, LC‑39A	SpaceX CRS-31 (Cargo Dragon C208-5)	2,762 kg (6,089 lb)	LEO (ISS)	NASA (CRS)	Success	Success (LZ‑1)
389	Carried 2,762 kg (6,089 lb) of cargo and supplies to the International Space Station (ISS). CRS-31 is the first Dragon scheduled to perform a test "reboost" of the ISS on November 8, 2024, burning its aft-facing Draco thrusters for 12.5 minutes to counteract atmospheric drag on the station.								
390	November 7, 2024; 20:19	F9 B5; B1085‑3	Cape Canaveral, SLC‑40	Starlink: Group 6-77 (23 satellites)	~17,100 kg (37,700 lb)	LEO	SpaceX	Success	Success (JRTI)
390	Launch of 23 Starlink v2 mini satellites to a 559 km (347 mi) orbit at an inclination of 43° to expand internet constellation.								
391	November 9, 2024; 06:14	F9 B5; B1081‑11	Vandenberg, SLC-4E	Starlink: Group 9-10 (20 satellites)	~16,300 kg (35,900 lb)	LEO	SpaceX	Success	Success (OCISLY)
391	Launch of 20 Starlink v2 mini satellites, including 13 with direct-to-cell connectivity, to a 535 km (332 mi) orbit at an inclination of 53° to expand internet constellation.								
392	November 11, 2024; 17:22	F9 B5; B1067‑23	Kennedy, LC‑39A	Koreasat 6A	3,500 kg (7,700 lb)	GTO	KT Sat	Success	Success (LZ‑1)
392	South Korean communications satellite built on the Spacebus-4000B2 platform. To be positioned at 116° east. First booster to successfully complete 23 launches and landings, surpassing booster B1062, which experienced a landing failure on its 23rd flight. Koreasat 6A weigh about 3.5 metric tons.								
393	November 11, 2024; 21:28	F9 B5; B1080‑12	Cape Canaveral, SLC‑40	Starlink: Group 6-69 (24 satellites)	~17,500 kg (38,600 lb)	LEO	SpaceX	Success	Success (ASOG)
393	Launch of 24 Starlink v2 mini satellites to a 559 km (347 mi) orbit at an inclination of 43° to expand internet constellation. Second Starlink v2 mini mission to launch 24 satellites, the first was Group 6-39, launched on flight F9-303 in February 2024.								
394	November 14, 2024; 05:23	F9 B5; B1082‑8	Vandenberg, SLC-4E	Starlink: Group 9-11 (20 satellites)	~16,300 kg (35,900 lb)	LEO	SpaceX	Success	Success (OCISLY)
394	Launch of 20 Starlink v2 mini satellites, including 13 with direct-to-cell connectivity, to a 535 km (332 mi) orbit at an inclination of 53° to expand internet constellation.								
395	November 14, 2024; 13:21	F9 B5; B1076‑18	Cape Canaveral, SLC‑40	Starlink: Group 6-68 (24 satellites)	~17,500 kg (38,600 lb)	LEO	SpaceX	Success	Success (JRTI)
395	Launch of 24 Starlink v2 mini satellites to a 559 km (347 mi) orbit at an inclination of 43° to expand internet constellation. First time SpaceX has completed 17 Falcon launches in 31 days.								
396	November 17, 2024; 22:28	F9 B5; B1077‑16	Kennedy, LC‑39A	Optus-X/TD7	~4,000 kg (8,800 lb)	GTO	Optus	Success	Success (ASOG)
396	Northrop Grumman-built geostationary military communications satellite for Australian satellite operator Optus.								
397	November 18, 2024; 05:53	F9 B5; B1071‑20	Vandenberg, SLC-4E	Starlink: Group 9-12 (20 satellites)	~16,300 kg (35,900 lb)	LEO	SpaceX	Success	Success (OCISLY)
397	Launch of 20 Starlink v2 mini satellites, including 13 with direct-to-cell connectivity, to a 535 km (332 mi) orbit at an inclination of 53° to expand internet constellation.								
398	November 18, 2024; 18:31	F9 B5; B1073‑19	Cape Canaveral, SLC‑40	GSAT-20 (GSAT-N2)	4,700 kg (10,400 lb)	GTO	New Space India Limited; Dish TV	Success	Success (JRTI)
398	Indian telecommunications satellite for Dish TV.								
399	November 21, 2024; 16:07	F9 B5; B1069‑20	Cape Canaveral, SLC‑40	Starlink: Group 6-66 (24 satellites)	~17,500 kg (38,600 lb)	LEO	SpaceX	Success	Success (ASOG)
399	Launch of 24 Starlink v2 mini satellites to a 559 km (347 mi) orbit at an inclination of 43° to expand internet constellation. One of the fairing halves flew for a record 21st time. SLC-40 broke its own record for most launches from a single launch pad with 56 launches in this year, up from 55 launches last year.								
400	November 24, 2024; 05:25	F9 B5; B1075‑15	Vandenberg, SLC-4E	Starlink: Group 9-13 (20 satellites)	~16,300 kg (35,900 lb)	LEO	SpaceX	Success	Success (OCISLY)
400	Launch of 20 Starlink v2 mini satellites, including 13 with direct-to-cell connectivity, to a 535 km (332 mi) orbit at an inclination of 53° to expand internet constellation. 400th launch of Falcon 9 launch vehicle and 100th launch from SLC-4E.								
401	November 25, 2024; 10:02	F9 B5; B1080‑13	Cape Canaveral, SLC‑40	Starlink: Group 12-1 (23 satellites)	~17,100 kg (37,700 lb)	LEO	SpaceX	Success	Success (JRTI)
401	Launch of 23 Starlink v2 mini satellites, including 12 with direct-to-cell connectivity, to a 559 km (347 mi) orbit at an inclination of 43° to expand internet constellation. New first stage turnaround record of 13 days, 12 hours, and 44 minutes from this booster's previous launch (Flight 393) on November 11, the previous record was 21 days.								
402	November 27, 2024; 04:41	F9 B5; B1078‑15	Kennedy, LC‑39A	Starlink: Group 6-76 (24 satellites)	~17,500 kg (38,600 lb)	LEO	SpaceX	Success	Success (ASOG)
402	Launch of 24 Starlink v2 mini satellites to a 559 km (347 mi) orbit at an inclination of 43° to expand internet constellation. 400th successful mission and Falcon's 375th overall successful landing.								
403	November 30, 2024; 05:00	F9 B5; B1083‑6	Cape Canaveral, SLC‑40	Starlink: Group 6-65 (24 satellites)	~17,500 kg (38,600 lb)	LEO	SpaceX	Success	Success (JRTI)
403	Launch of 24 Starlink v2 mini satellites to a 559 km (347 mi) orbit at an inclination of 43° to expand internet constellation. First time SpaceX has completed 15 Falcon launches in a calendar month.								
404	November 30, 2024; 08:10	F9 B5; B1088‑1	Vandenberg, SLC-4E	NROL-126 (2 Starshield satellites) + Starlink: Group N-01 (20 satellites)	~16,100 kg (35,500 lb) (Starlink)	LEO	NRO/SpaceX	Success	Success (OCISLY)
404	Fifth launch of SpaceX/Northrop Grumman-built Starshield satellites for the National Reconnaissance Office, with 20 Starlink v2 mini satellites as rideshare. First time SpaceX has completed 16 Falcon and 17 SpaceX (including Starship IFT-6) launches in a calendar month.								

=== December ===
Flight No.	Date and time (UTC)	Version, booster	Launch site	Payload	Payload mass	Orbit	Customer	Launch outcome	Booster landing
405	December 4, 2024; 10:13	F9 B5; B1067‑24	Cape Canaveral, SLC‑40	Starlink: Group 6-70 (24 satellites)	~17,500 kg (38,600 lb)	LEO	SpaceX	Success	Success (ASOG)
405	Launch of 24 Starlink v2 mini satellites to a 559 km (347 mi) orbit at an inclination of 43° to expand internet constellation. First booster to fly 24th time, new record.								
406	December 5, 2024; 03:05	F9 B5; B1081‑12	Vandenberg, SLC-4E	Starlink: Group 9-14 (20 satellites)	~16,300 kg (35,900 lb)	LEO	SpaceX	Success	Success (OCISLY)
406	Launch of 20 Starlink v2 mini satellites, including 13 with direct-to-cell connectivity, to a 535 km (332 mi) orbit at an inclination of 53° to expand internet constellation.								
407	December 5, 2024; 16:10	F9 B5; B1076‑19	Kennedy, LC‑39A	SXM-9	7,000 kg (15,000 lb)	GTO	SiriusXM	Success	Success (JRTI)
407	SXM-9 is a high-powered digital audio radio satellite for SiriusXM. Manufactured by Maxar Technologies on their 1300-class platform, the SXM-9 features a reflector that can unfurl to span nearly 10 meters (33 ft) to transmit. SpaceX stated that this was the 100th booster landing on JRTI. B1076 became the first booster to fly ten times in one calendar year on December 5, 2024.								
408	December 8, 2024; 05:12	F9 B5; B1086‑2	Cape Canaveral, SLC‑40	Starlink: Group 12-5 (23 satellites)	~17,100 kg (37,700 lb)	LEO	SpaceX	Success	Success (ASOG)
408	Launch of 23 Starlink v2 mini satellites, including 13 with direct-to-cell connectivity, to a 559 km (347 mi) orbit at an inclination of 43° to expand internet constellation. Booster 1086, used on this mission, was previously used as a Falcon Heavy side booster on the GOES-U mission. This marks the second time (after B1052) SpaceX has converted a Falcon Heavy side booster into a traditional Falcon 9.								
409	December 13, 2024; 21:55	F9 B5; B1082‑9	Vandenberg, SLC-4E	Starlink: Group 11-2 (22 satellites)	~16,700 kg (36,800 lb)	LEO	SpaceX	Success	Success (OCISLY)
409	Launch of 22 Starlink v2 mini satellites to a 535 km (332 mi) orbit at an inclination of 53° to expand internet constellation. 100th landing on droneship in 2024, a record.								
410	December 17, 2024; 00:52	F9 B5; B1085‑4	Cape Canaveral, SLC‑40	GPS III-7 (RRT-1)	~4,350 kg (9,590 lb)	MEO	USSF	Success	Success (ASOG)
410	Launch is part of Phase 2 US Air Force contract awarded in 2022. GPS III-7, originally scheduled to launch on a ULA Vulcan rocket, was reassigned to the Falcon 9, as a part of Rapid Response Trailblazer-1 (RRT-1) mission, following uncertainties in Vulcan's readiness. As a result, GPS III-10, originally planned to launch on the Falcon 9, will now launch on Vulcan. Sixth time a second stage featured Falcon medium coast mission-extension kit.								
411	December 17, 2024; 13:19	F9 B5; B1063‑22	Vandenberg, SLC‑4E	NROL-149 (22 Starshield satellites)	Unknown	LEO	NRO	Success	Success (OCISLY)
411	Sixth launch of SpaceX/Northrop Grumman-built Starshield satellites for the National Reconnaissance Office.								
412	December 17, 2024; 22:26	F9 B5; B1090‑1	Kennedy, LC‑39A	O3b mPOWER 7 & 8	3,400 kg (7,500 lb)	MEO	SES	Success	Success (JRTI)
412	In August 2020, SES expanded the O3b mPOWER contract with two additional launches, raising the number of satellites from 7 to 11 satellites at nearly 2 tons each. One of the fairings halves made its 22nd flight.								
413	December 21, 2024; 11:34	F9 B5; B1071‑21	Vandenberg, SLC-4E	Bandwagon-2 (30 payload smallsat rideshare); 425 Project Flight 3	800 kg (1,800 lb) (main satellite) + unknown additional	LEO	Various; Republic of Korea Armed Forces	Success	Success (LZ‑4)
413	Dedicated SmallSat Rideshare mission to 45 degree inclination 550–600 km altitude. 425 Project Flight 3 is a military SAR satellite of South Korea with a mass of ~800 kg.								
414	December 23, 2024; 05:35	F9 B5; B1080‑14	Kennedy, LC‑39A	Starlink: Group 12-2 (21 satellites)	~16,500 kg (36,400 lb)	LEO	SpaceX	Success	Success (JRTI)
414	Launch of 21 Starlink v2 mini satellites, including 13 with direct-to-cell connectivity, to a 559 km (347 mi) orbit at an inclination of 43° to expand internet constellation.								
415	December 29, 2024; 01:58	F9 B5; B1075‑16	Vandenberg, SLC-4E	Starlink: Group 11-3 (22 satellites)	~16,700 kg (36,800 lb)	LEO	SpaceX	Success	Success (OCISLY)
415	Launch of 22 Starlink v2 mini satellites to a 535 km (332 mi) orbit at an inclination of 53° to expand internet constellation.								
416	December 29, 2024; 05:00	F9 B5; B1083‑7	Cape Canaveral, SLC‑40	Astranis: From One to Many (4 satellites)	1,600 kg (3,500 lb)	GTO	Astranis	Success	Success (ASOG)
416	Dedicated Falcon 9 launch to put four Astranis MicroGEO communications satellites into service. The MicroGEOs were launched to a custom geostationary orbit, with the four satellites individually conducting on-orbit maneuvers to inject themselves into their orbital slots. The four spacecraft were mounted to a standard adapter ring, known as an ESPA-Grande, for ease of deployment. B1083 supported the Astranis mission, previously it was B1077, but due to some problem identified, the first stage of this mission was changed.								
417	December 31, 2024; 05:39	F9 B5; B1078‑16	Kennedy, LC‑39A	Starlink: Group 12-6 (21 satellites)	~16,500 kg (36,400 lb)	LEO	SpaceX	Success	Success (JRTI)
417	Launch of 21 Starlink v2 mini satellites, including 13 with direct-to-cell connectivity, to a 559 km (347 mi) orbit at an inclination of 43° to expand internet constellation.								

== Notable launches in 2024 ==
=== Starlink 9-3 upper stage anomaly ===
On July 12, 2024, SpaceX launched a group of Starlink satellites from Vandenberg Space Force Base in California. While the booster performed normally, including a successful droneship landing, the upper stage failed to relight for a second burn, with ice appearing to accumulate around the engine during the first burn due to a liquid oxygen leak that developed from vibrational fatigue which led to a crack in a pressure sensor line. The satellites were deployed into a very low orbit with a perigee of 135 kilometers (84 mi), less than half than would be achieved on a normal launch. After separation, the satellites were commanded to burn their ion thrusters. SpaceX modified the satellite software so the thrusters would produce as much thrust as possible. Despite this, all of the satellites re-entered the atmosphere following the launch. This launch was the first Falcon 9 failure since the pre-flight anomaly of AMOS-6, breaking a streak of 325 successful launches, a Guinness World Record.

== See also ==
- List of Falcon 1 launches
- List of Falcon 9 first-stage boosters
- List of SpaceX Dragon 1 missions
- List of SpaceX Dragon 2 missions
- List of Starlink and Starshield launches
- List of Starship launches
