= List of European astronauts =

Astronauts resident in Europe

This is an incomplete list of astronauts who are resident in any of the countries of Europe, who have reached Earth's orbit, exclusive of the former Soviet republics of Russia, Belarus, and Ukraine. People who are "space tourists" rather than working astronauts may be included, indicated by italics.

== Alphabetical list ==
EAC = European Astronaut Corps

- (Bulgaria) Aleksandar Panayotov Aleksandrov (Intercosmos) — Soyuz TM-5
- (France) Patrick Baudry, second Frenchman in space, born in Douala, Cameroon — STS-51-G
- (Slovakia) Ivan Bella, first Slovak in space — Soyuz TM-29/28
- (Italy) Maurizio Cheli, EAC — STS-75
- (France) Jean-Loup Chrétien, CNES (Intercosmos), first French person in space and first non-Soviet European to walk in space — Soyuz T-6, Soyuz TM-7/6, STS-86
- (France) Jean-François Clervoy, EAC — STS-66, STS-84, STS-103
- (Italy) Samantha Cristoforetti, EAC — Soyuz TMA-15M (Expedition 42, SpaceX Crew-4 (Expedition 67)
- (Belgium) Frank De Winne, EAC — Soyuz TMA-1/TM-34, Soyuz TMA-15
- (Spain) Pedro Duque, EAC, first Spaniard in space — STS-95, Soyuz TMA-3/2
- (Germany) Reinhold Ewald, EAC — Soyuz TM-25/24
- (France) Léopold Eyharts, EAC — Soyuz TM-27/26, STS-122/123
- (Hungary) Bertalan Farkas (Intercosmos), first Hungarian in space — Soyuz 36/35
- (France) Jean-Jacques Favier, born in Kehl, Germany — STS-78
- (Germany) Klaus-Dietrich Flade — Soyuz TM-14/13
- (Belgium) Dirk Frimout, first Belgian in space — STS-45
- (Sweden) Christer Fuglesang, EAC, first Swede in space — STS-116, STS-128
- Reinhard Furrer, born in Wörgl, Austria (1940–1995) — STS-61-A (flew for West Germany)
- (Italy) Umberto Guidoni, EAC, first European on the International Space Station — STS-75, STS-100
- (France) Claudie André-Deshays Haigneré, EAC, first Frenchwoman in space (Mir, 1996) — Soyuz TM-24/23, Soyuz TM-33/32
- (France) Jean-Pierre Haigneré, EAC — Soyuz TM-17/16, Soyuz TM-29
- (Poland) Mirosław Hermaszewski (Intercosmos), first Pole in space — Soyuz 30
- (Bulgaria) Georgi Ivanov (Intercosmos), first Bulgarian in space — Soyuz 33
- Sigmund Jähn (Intercosmos), first German in space — Soyuz 31/29 (flew for East Germany)
- (Netherlands) André Kuipers, EAC — Soyuz TMA-4/3
- (Italy) Franco Malerba, first Italian in space — STS-46
- (Germany) Matthias Maurer, SpaceX Crew-3
- Ulf Merbold, EAC — STS-9, STS-42, Soyuz TM-20/19 (flew for both West Germany and united Germany)
- Ernst Messerschmid — STS-61-A (flew for West Germany)
- (Denmark) Andreas Mogensen, EAC, first Dane in space — Soyuz TMA-18M, SpaceX Crew-7
- (Italy) Paolo A. Nespoli, EAC — STS-120
- (Switzerland) Claude Nicollier, EAC, first Swiss in space — STS-46, STS-61, STS-75, STS-103
- (Netherlands) Wubbo Ockels, EAC, first Dutchman in space — STS-61-A
- (Italy) Luca Parmitano, EAC — Soyuz TMA-09M (Expedition 36)
- (France) Philippe Perrin, EAC, born in Meknes, Morocco — STS-111
- (France) Thomas Pesquet, EAC, — ISS
- (Romania) Dumitru Prunariu (Intercosmos), first Romanian in space — Soyuz 40
- (Germany) Thomas Reiter, EAC, first German to walk in space and first ESA astronaut to stay on the ISS — Soyuz TM-22, STS-121/116
- (Czechoslovakia) Vladimír Remek (Intercosmos), first Czech and first non-Soviet European in space — Soyuz 28
- (Germany) Hans Schlegel, EAC — STS-55, STS-122
- (United Kingdom) Helen Sharman, first Briton in space — Soyuz TM-12/11
- (United Kingdom) Mark Shuttleworth, second "space tourist" and first South African in space — Soyuz TM-34/33
- (Germany) Gerhard Thiele, EAC — STS-99
- (France) Michel Tognini, EAC — Soyuz TM-15/14, STS-93
- (Austria) Franz Viehböck, first Austrian in space — Soyuz TM-13/12
- (Italy) Roberto Vittori, EAC — Soyuz TM-34/33, Soyuz TMA-6/5
- (Germany) Ulrich Walter — STS-55
- (Italy) Walter Villadei — Axiom Mission 3
- (Sweden) / (Norway) Marcus Wandt, EAC — Axiom Mission 3 (2024)
- (Turkey) Alper Gezeravcı — Axiom Mission 3 (2024)
- (Malta) (Note: Wang was born in China but lives primarily in Svalbard and since 2023 is also a citizen of Malta and Saint Kitts and Nevis through their golden visa programs. He will wear the flag of Malta on his spacesuit during the spaceflight.) Chun Wang — Axiom Mission 3 (2024)
- (Norway) / (United Kingdom) (Note: Mikkelsen was born in the United Kingdom, but is now a citizen of Norway. She will wear the flag of Norway on her spacesuit during the spaceflight.) Jannicke Mikkelsen, first Norwegian in space. First person to enter a polar retrograde orbit, i.e., to fly over Earth's poles. The first European astronaut to command a spacecraft, — Fram2 (2025)
- (Germany) Rabea Rogge, first german woman and first person to enter a polar retrograde orbit, i.e., to fly over Earth's poles., — Fram2 (2025)
- (Poland) Sławosz Uznański-Wiśniewski, EAC — Axiom Mission 4 (2025)
- (Hungary) Tibor Kapu — Axiom Mission 4 (2025)

== Resident outside Europe ==
Other European astronauts now residing or holding citizenship outside Europe include:

- (United Kingdom) Michael Foale, born in Louth, England, dual British and American citizen.
- (United Kingdom) Nicholas Patrick, born in Saltburn-by-the-Sea, England.
- (United Kingdom) Piers Sellers, born in Crowborough, England. Resident in US, died 2016.
- Charles Simonyi, born in Budapest, Hungary. Fifth space tourist.
- Lodewijk van den Berg, born in Sluiskil, Netherlands. Resident in US, died 2022.

== See also ==
- List of Soviet human spaceflight missions
- List of Russian human spaceflight missions
- List of space travelers by nationality
