= Axiom Mission 3 =

2024 private crewed spaceflight to the ISS

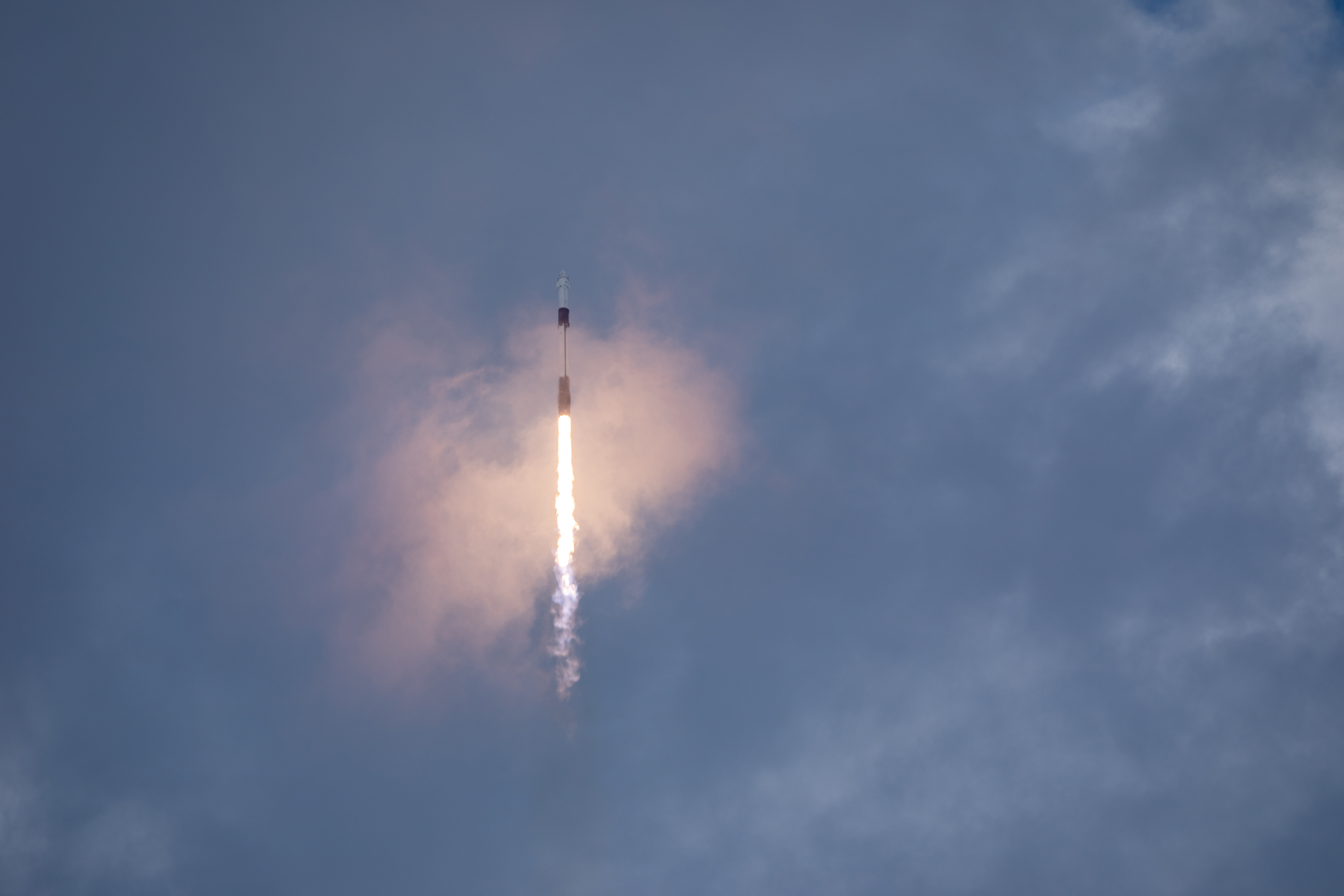
- Launch of Ax-3 on a Falcon 9 rocket
- Names: Ax-3
- Mission type: Private spaceflight to the ISS
- Operator: Axiom Space; SpaceX
- COSPAR ID: 2024-014A
- SATCAT no.: 58815
- Website: www.axiomspace.com/missions/ax3
- Mission duration: 21 days, 15 hours, 41 minutes

Spacecraft properties
- Spacecraft: Crew Dragon Freedom
- Spacecraft type: Crew Dragon
- Manufacturer: SpaceX
- Launch mass: 12,519 kg (27,600 lb)
- Landing mass: 9,616 kg (21,200 lb)

Crew
- Crew size: 4
- Members: Michael López-Alegría; Walter Villadei; Alper Gezeravcı; Marcus Wandt

Start of mission
- Launch date: January 18, 2024, 21:49:11 UTC (5:49:11 pm EST)
- Rocket: Falcon 9 Block 5 (B1080‑5), Flight 291
- Launch site: Kennedy, LC‑39A
- Contractor: SpaceX

End of mission
- Recovered by: MV Shannon
- Landing date: February 9, 2024, 13:30 UTC (8:30 am EST)
- Landing site: Atlantic Ocean, near Daytona Beach, Florida (29.8°N 80.7°W)

Orbital parameters
- Reference system: Geocentric orbit
- Regime: Low Earth orbit
- Inclination: 51.66°

Docking with ISS
- Docking port: Harmony forward
- Docking date: January 20, 2024, 10:42 UTC
- Undocking date: February 7, 2024, 14:20 UTC
- Time docked: 18 days, 3 hours, 38 minutes
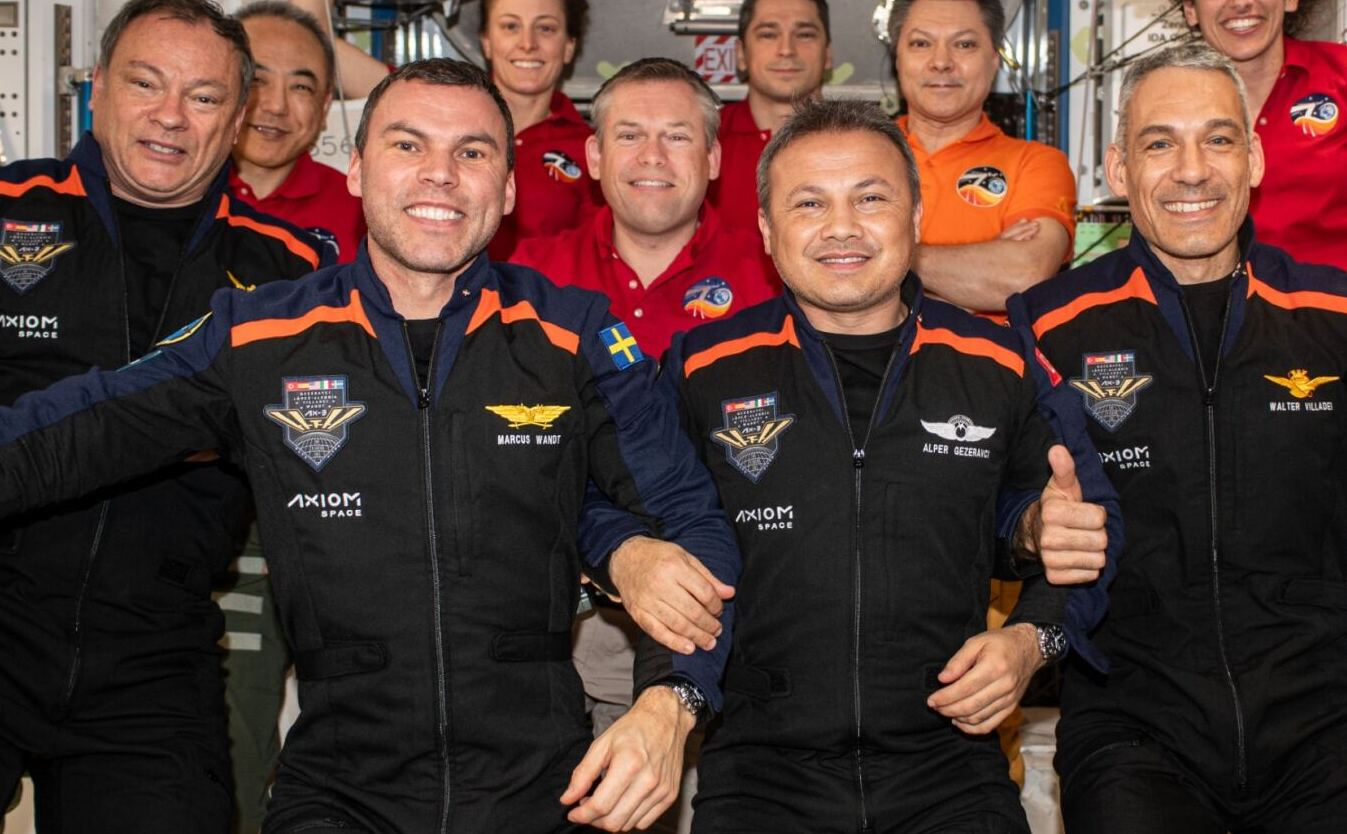
- Left: Axiom mission patch Right: Wandt's Muninn mission patch From left: López-Alegría, Wandt, Gezeravcı, and Villadei in black jumpsuits Axiom Space missions Crew Dragon flights

Axiom Mission 3 (or Ax-3) was a private spaceflight to the International Space Station. The flight launched on January 18, 2024, and lasted for 21 days, successfully splashing down in the Atlantic Ocean. It was operated by Axiom Space and used a SpaceX Crew Dragon spacecraft. The booster, B1080, had previously flown Axiom-2, among other high-profile missions.

== Muninn ==
The Swedish component of Ax-3 would be the Muninn mission with Marcus Wandt as the first ESA astronaut launched by a private space provider. Wandt was also the first member of the 2022 European Space Agency Astronaut Group to receive a spaceflight mission. The mission's name comes from one of Odin's two ravens that together combined symbolize the human mind with Danish astronaut Andreas Mogensen being launched as part of the Huginn mission on SpaceX Crew-7. This was the first time that two Scandinavians were in space at the same time. Wandt conducted 20 experiments and participated in five educational programs from understanding the effects of space habitat designs on astronaut stress levels to exploring cellular structure changes and gene expression in microgravity. The mission's patch shows Muninn gliding around Earth to share the knowledge collected by Wandt. The dark blue circle represents Earth and includes lighter lines depicting Sweden.

== Crew ==
All four crewmembers have backgrounds as military pilots. Michael López-Alegría was the commander as an employee of Axiom; Walter Villadei from the Italian Air Force was the mission pilot. The mission specialists were Alper Gezeravcı who was the first astronaut from Turkey; and Swedish project astronaut Marcus Wandt.

Prime crew
Position	Astronaut
Commander	Michael López-Alegría, Axiom Space; Sixth spaceflight
Pilot	Walter Villadei, AM; Second spaceflight
Mission specialist	Alper Gezeravcı, TUA; First spaceflight
Mission specialist	Marcus Wandt, SNSA / ESA; First spaceflight

Backup crew
Position	Astronaut
Commander	Peggy Whitson, Axiom Space
Mission specialist	Tuva Cihangir Atasever, TUA

== Mission ==
The crew lifted off on a Falcon 9 from LC-39A Florida to dock with the International Space Station for an intended mission duration of approximately two weeks. Final mission duration was 21 days; mission ended with a splashdown into the Atlantic Ocean on February 9, 2024.

== Gallery ==
Axiom Mission 3
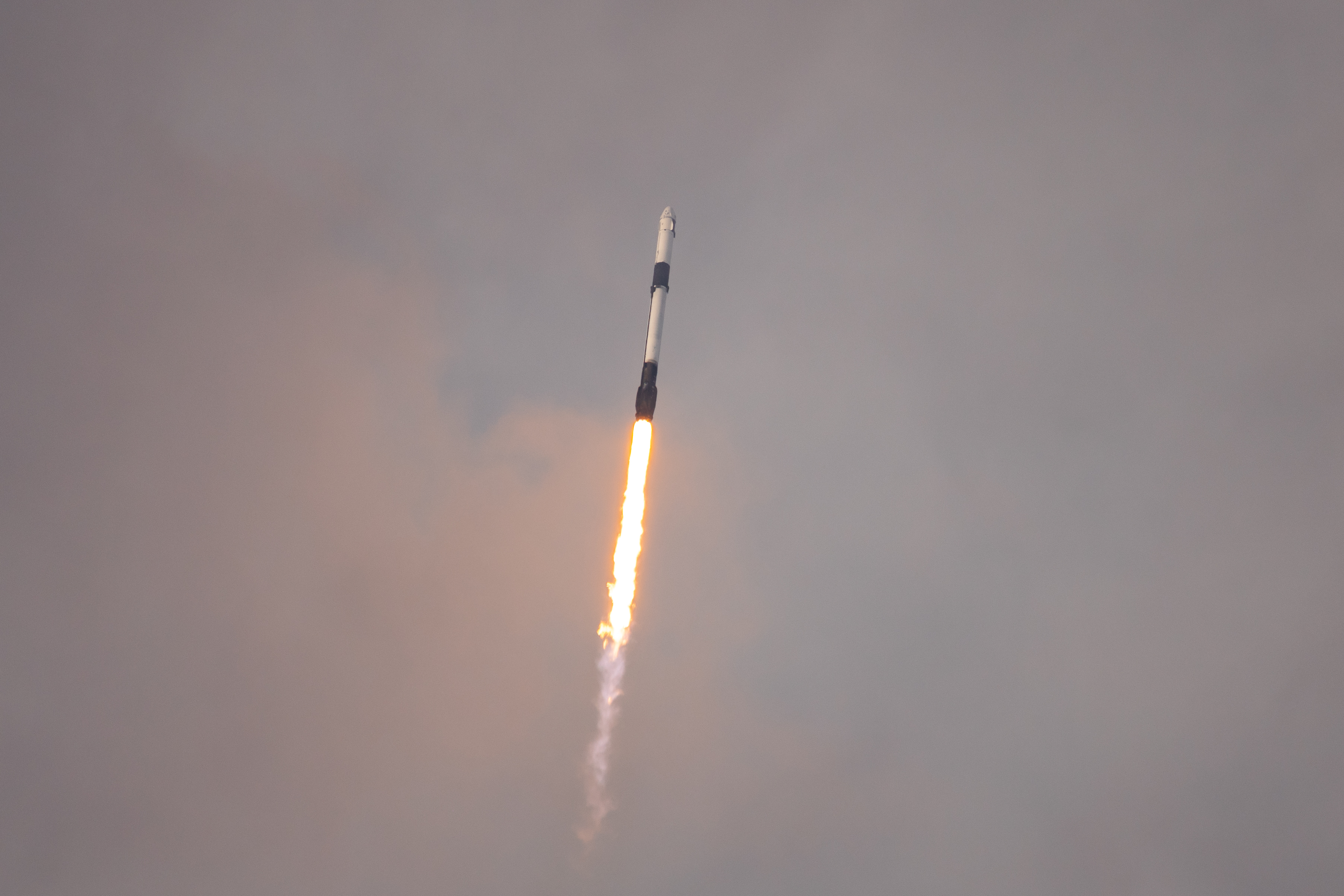
Launch of Axiom-3

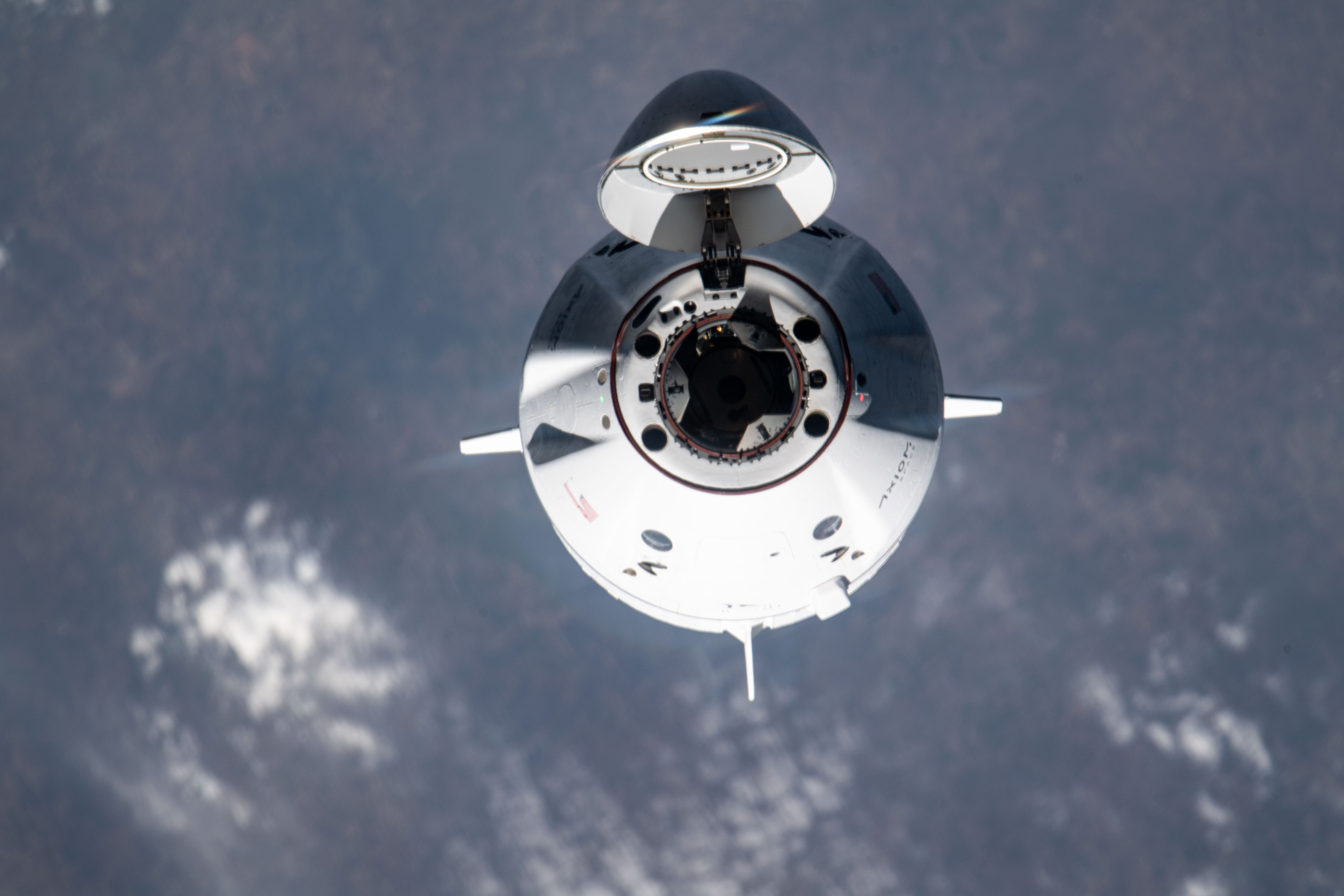
Axiom-3 approaching the ISS

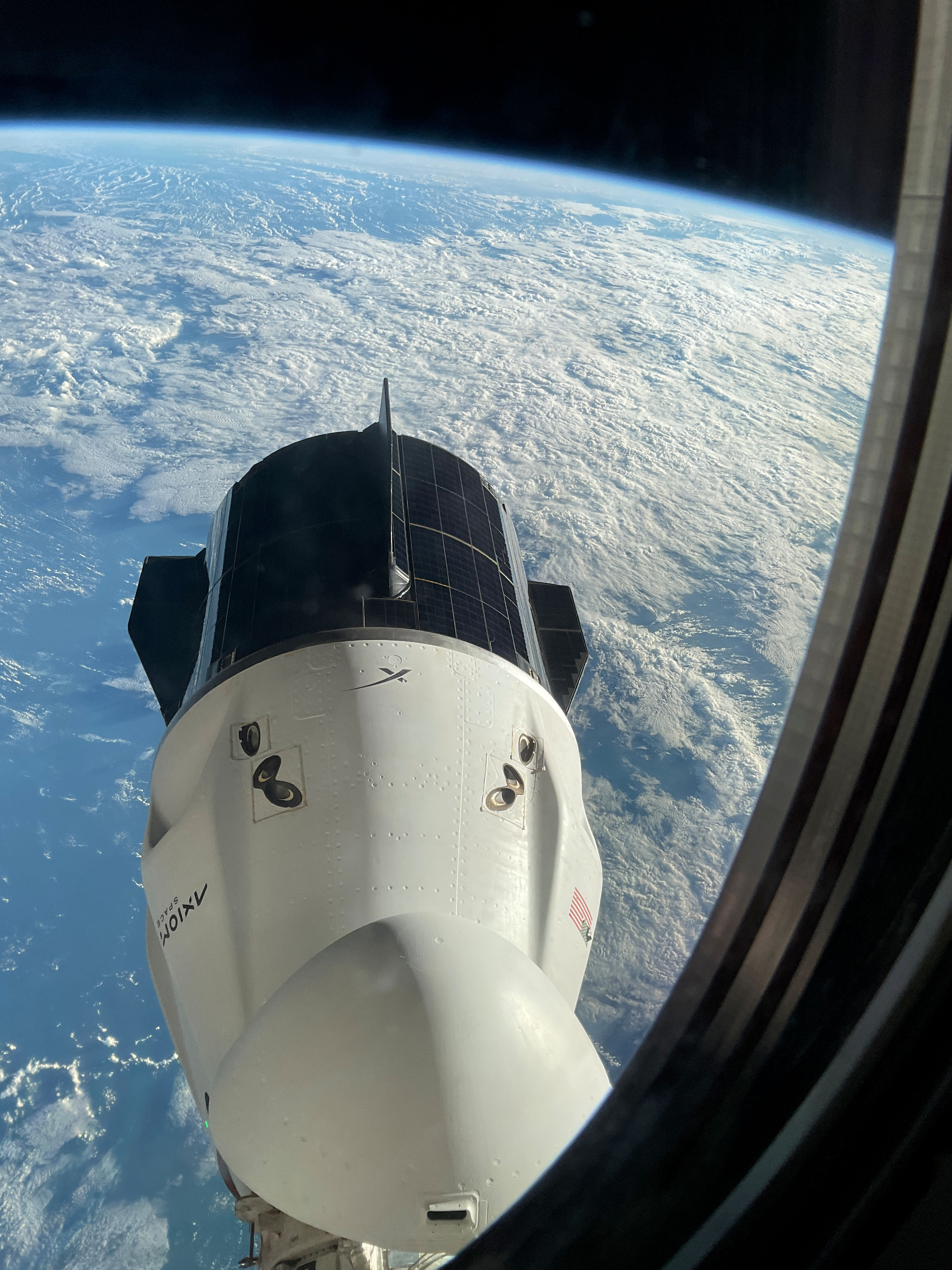
Axiom-3 docked to the ISS

== See also ==
- Expedition 70
- Timeline of private spaceflight
- List of European Space Agency programmes and missions
