= Alper Gezeravcı =

Turkish fighter pilot and astronaut (born 1979)

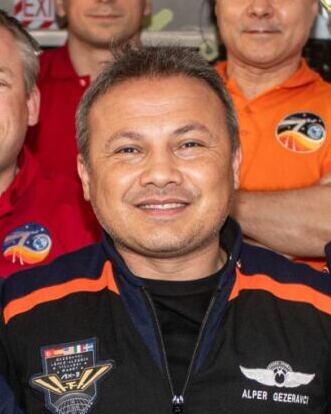
- Born: 2 December 1979 (age 46); Silifke, Mersin, Turkey
- Education: Turkish Air Force Academy (BS); Air Force Institute of Technology
- Occupations: Commercial astronaut; Engineer; Pilot
- Space career

Axiom; Commercial astronaut; Mission specialist
- Rank: Brigadier General
- Time in space: 21d 15h 41m
- Missions: Axiom Mission 3

Alper Gezeravcı (born 2 December 1979) is a military pilot and the first Turkish astronaut. He flew to International Space Station by taking part in a special space flight on 18 January 2024 with the Axiom Mission 3 (or Ax-3) mission.

== Early life ==
He was born in Silifke, Mersin, to a family of Yörük descent.

Colonel Pilot Alper Gezeravcı was among the soldiers expelled from the Turkish Armed Forces (TSK) in 2012 as part of the investigation into the FETÖ's espionage conspiracy in Izmir. He was acquitted and cleared in 2020, subsequently returning to the TSK.

== Career ==
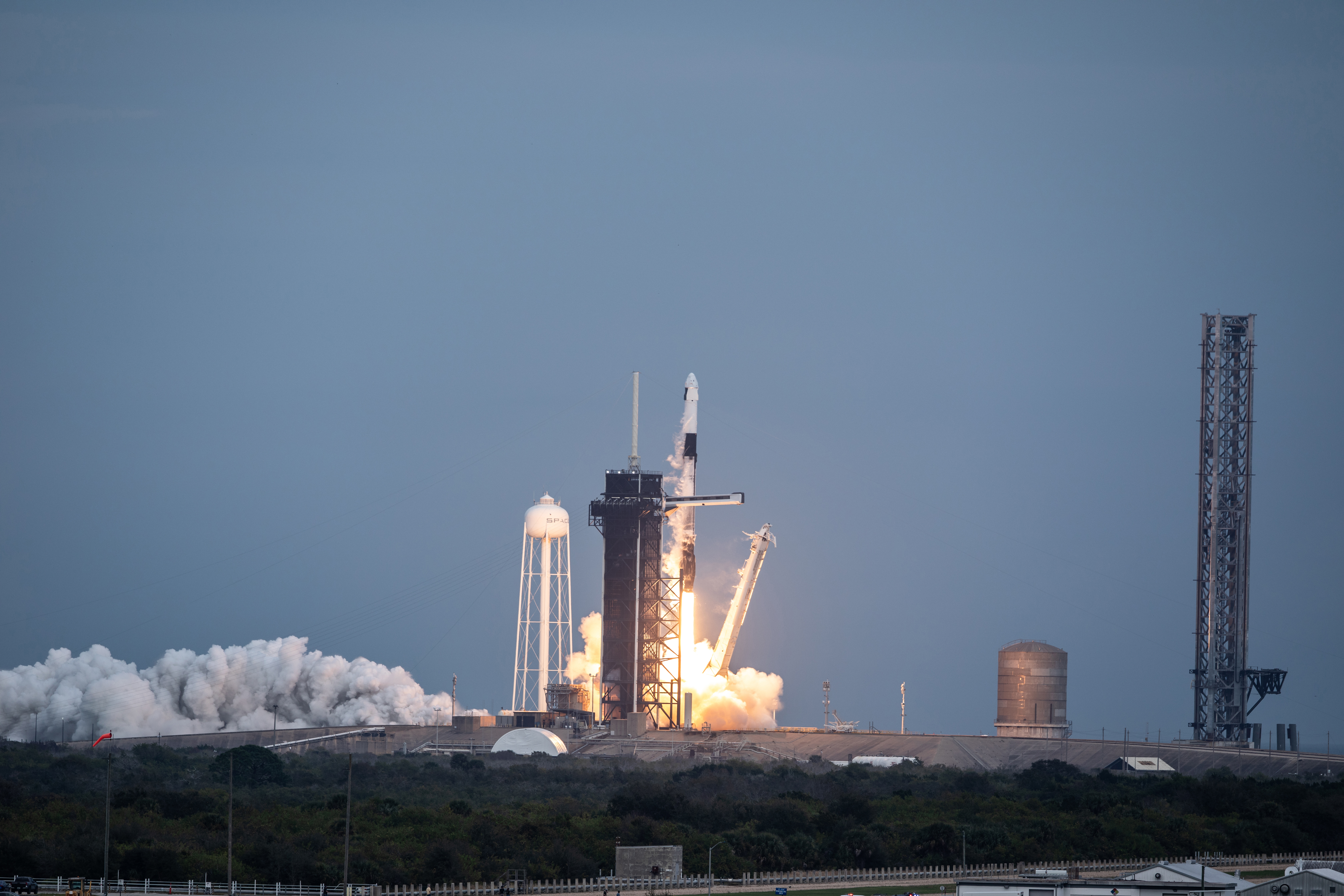
Takeoff of the Falcon 9 spacecraft carrying the crew

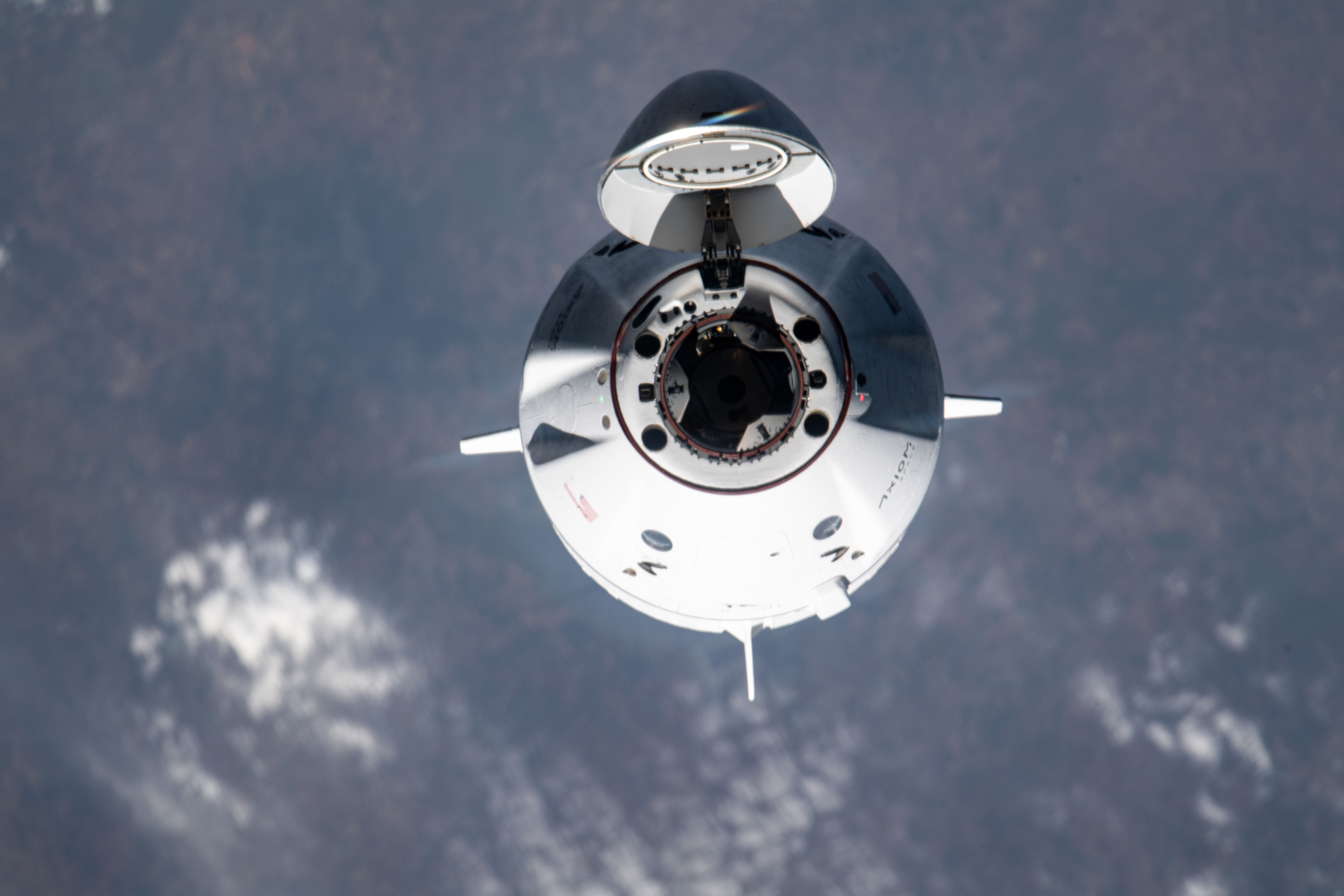
The Dragon Freedom spacecraft carrying the crew approaches the International Space Station

His appointment was announced in late April 2023 by Recep Tayyip Erdoğan. Gezeravcı spent 21 days in space as part of the Axiom Space-3 mission in January–February 2024. He flew with three other international astronauts from the Kennedy Space Center aboard a SpaceX Crew Dragon, launched by a Falcon 9 rocket. Gezeravcı brought along the Turkish flag, family photos, and some items related to Yörük culture.

Gezeravcı stated that he did salah ash-shukr (prayer of gratitude) in space and stated that people should be grateful for gravity. He explained that the 8-pointed Seljuk star on his mission patch carried "very important meanings" and represents the "fundamental principles of Islam." Gezeravcı also stated that he found opportunity to engage in Islamic contemplation and encouraged youth to preserve faith, citing Islamic engineers and astronomers al-Jazari and Ali Qushji as inspiration. The Turkish government frames the pursuit of aerospace and technological dominance not as Westernization, but as a "reclamation" of the science and technology heritage of the "Turkish-Islamic past", citing figures such as al-Jazari, Hezarfen Ahmed Çelebi, and Ibn Sina. The pursuit of technology is framed as inherently Islamic. Alper Gezeravcı's first words in space, with a reference to the founder of the Turkish Republic, Mustafa Kemal Atatürk, were "The future is in the skies."

He studied electronic engineering at the Turkish Air Force Academy and at the Air Force Institute of Technology in Dayton, Ohio. He is a pilot in the Turkish Air Force, with 21 years of experience; he flies F-16s.
