= Walter Villadei =

Italian Air Force pilot and astronaut (born 1974)

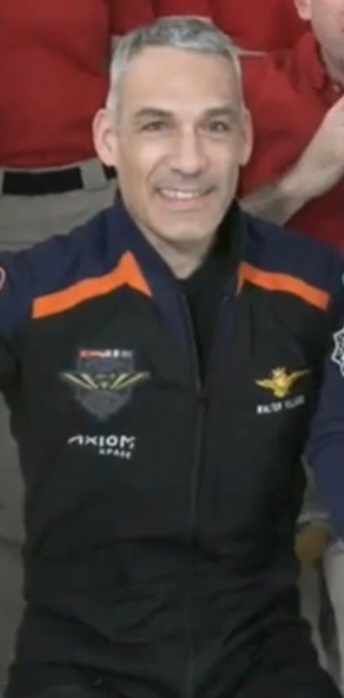
- Born: April 29, 1974 (age 52); Rome, Italy
- Space career
- Time in space: 21 days, 15 hours, 54 minutes and 50 seconds
- Missions: Galactic 01; Axiom Mission 3
- Military career
- Allegiance: Italy
- Branch: Italian Air Force

Walter Villadei (born April 29, 1974) is an Italian military officer. He graduated from the Academy of the Italian Air Force in Pozzuoli and holds a master's degree in aerospace engineering from the University of Naples Federico II and a specialization in astronautical engineering from the University of Rome. He was trained as a cosmonaut in Russia. He first flew to space in June 2023 on the Galactic 01 mission. In January-February 2024, he spent 18 days at the International Space Station as part of Axiom Mission 3.

== Career ==
Villadei began his career in 1998 at the 46th Aerial Transport Brigade in Pisa, where he worked on aircraft maintenance and several operational deployments abroad until 2003. He was then assigned to the Air Staff in Rome, within the Office of Advanced Technologies and UAV Programs. He earned a master's degree in satellites and orbital platforms in 2005 and represented the Air Staff on the Space Programs Defense Committee (technical level). In 2011, he was assigned to the new Space Policy Office established within the 3rd Department of the Air Staff. In 2014, he was appointed by the Presidency of the council as the national delegate to the European Commission for support and monitoring of space.

In 2008, Villadei began his initial spaceflight training at the Yuri Gagarin Cosmonaut Training Center in Star City, Russia. In 2012, he received his full cosmonaut wings, and in 2015, he completed his advanced pre-assignment training, earning qualifications as a Soyuz flight engineer, user of the Russian segment of the International Space Station, and extravehicular activity operator.

Villadei is also a regular lecturer at the Sapienza University of Rome and "Tor Vergata" on "Experimentation in Space" and "Space Systems." He graduated from the Senior Courses of the NATO Defense College in 2017.

Since September 2017, Villadei has been the head of the "Space Policy and Operations" office in the General Directorate of Space of the Air Staff. He is also a member of the scientific committee of the Italian Space Agency.

In 2021, he was selected to fly into space on the Virgin Galactic Unity 23 flight on a SpaceShipTwo. The mission was later renamed Galactic 01.

In 2022, he was selected for training in Houston to prepare for a future space flight with Axiom Space.

The same year, as part of an agreement between Axiom Space and the Italian Ministry of Technological Innovation and Digital Transition, Walter Villadei was selected as a back-up crew member for Axiom Mission 2, and was assigned as pilot on Axiom Mission 3, launched on January 18 2024. He spent 21 days in space, returning 9 February 2024 when Axiom Mission 3 splashed down into Atlantic Ocean.
