= Marcus Wandt =

Swedish ESA astronaut (born 1980)

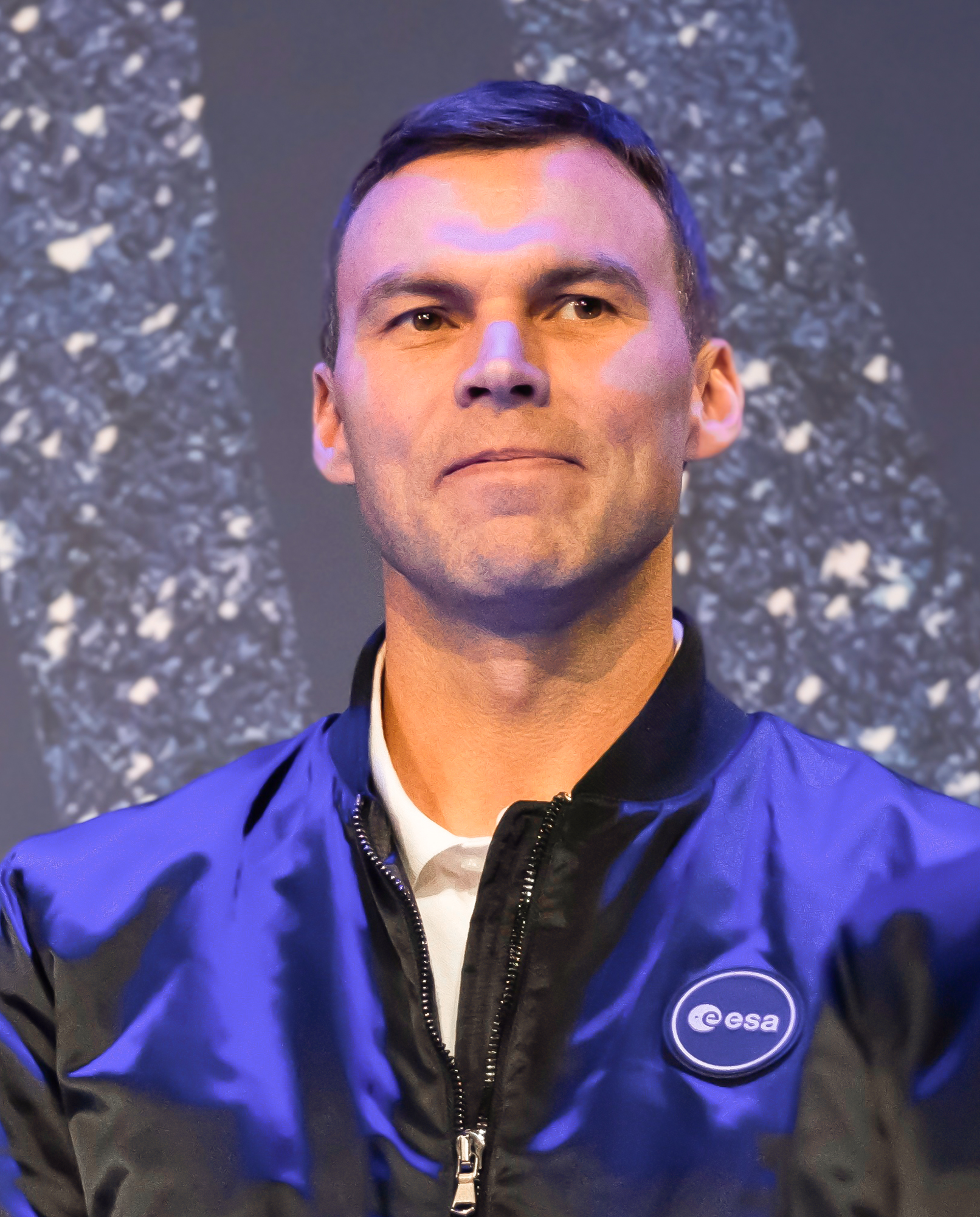
- Wandt at announcement of ESA Astronaut Class of 2022
- Born: September 22, 1980 (age 46); Mora, Sweden
- Education: Chalmers University of Technology
- Occupation: Test pilot
- Space career

ESA astronaut
- Status: Active
- Rank: Lt. Colonel
- Time in space: 21d 15h 41m
- Selection: 2022 ESA Group
- Missions: Axiom-3

Marcus Wandt (born September 21, 1980) is a Swedish test pilot and member of the 2022 European Space Agency Astronaut Group. In January 2024, he became the third Swedish astronaut to visit space, after Christer Fuglesang and Jessica Meir. Wandt is a Swedish and Norwegian citizen, thus becoming the first Norwegian citizen in space.

== Pre-ESA Career ==
From 2003 to 2014, Wandt was a fighter pilot in the Swedish Air Force, flying the Saab JAS 39 Gripen. In 2004, he joined the Swedish Air Force Flying Training School, where he received basic flight training. He received a master's degree in electrical engineering from Chalmers University of Technology in 2007. From 2013 to 2014, he trained at the United States Naval Test Pilot School where he graduated at the top of his class to become an experimental test pilot. In 2014 he joined SAAB Aeronautics as an experimental test pilot, before being promoted to chief test pilot and head of flight operations in 2020. He is also a member of the Swedish skeptics association Vetenskap och Folkbildning.

== European Space Agency career ==
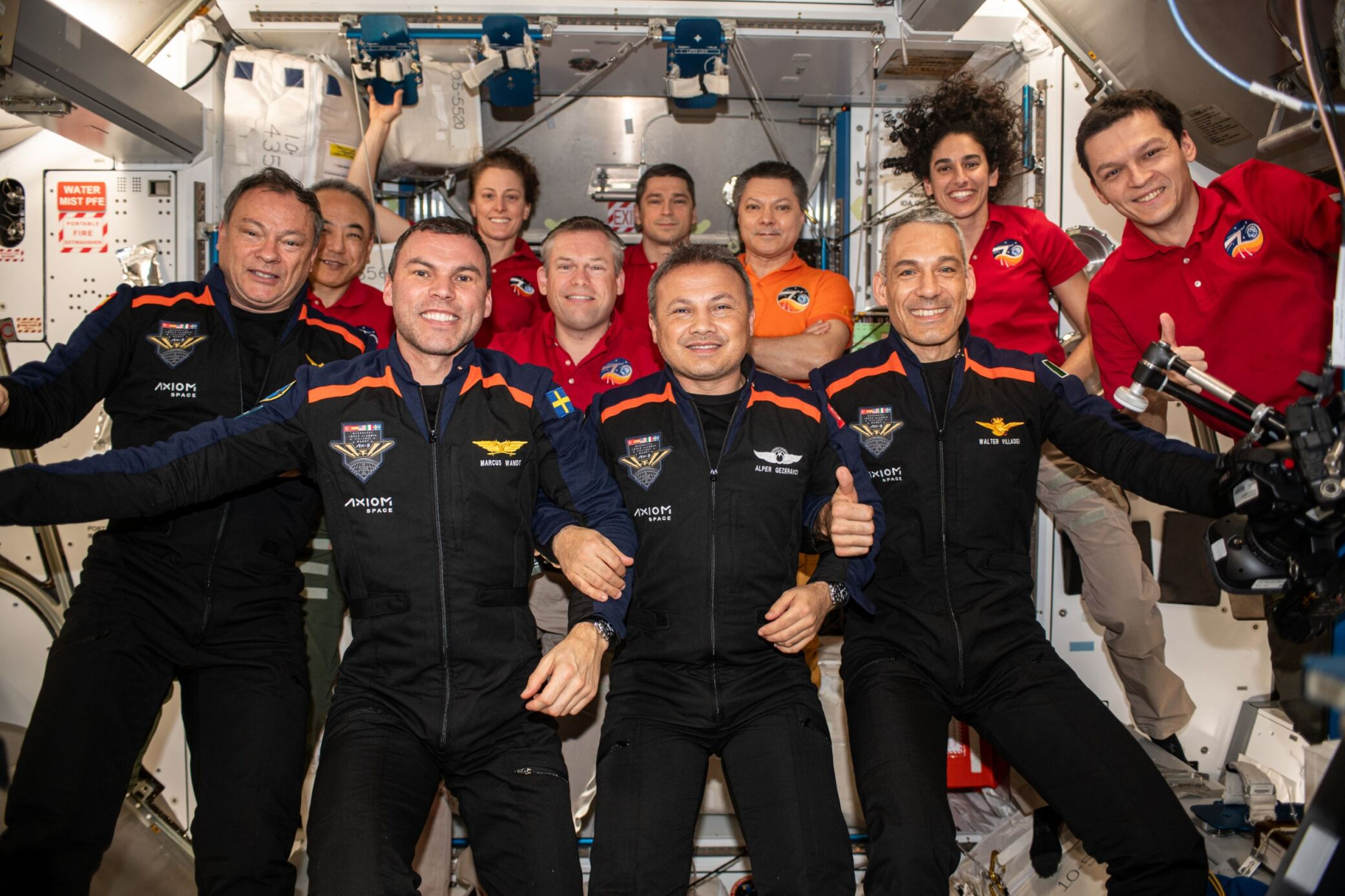
Wandt (front left) and the crew of Axiom-3 upon arrival at the ISS, alongside the crew of Expedition 70.

Wandt credits his wife with discovering and showing him the ESA application. ESA chose Marcus and 16 others, out of a total of approximately 22,500 applicants. In November 2022, Wandt was chosen as a member of ESA class of reserve astronauts and June 2023, ESA proposed Marcus Wandt for an upcoming flight from Axiom Mission 3. As a consequence he transitioned from reserve to "project astronaut" status.

Wandt is the first of any of the 2022 ESA astronauts to undertake a mission, and the fastest-trained astronaut in history; by contrast, Christer Fuglesang, the first Swede in space, flew 14 years after selection. The mission was called "Muninn" and coincides with the "Huginn" mission of Danish European Space Agency astronaut Andreas Mogensen aboard the International Space Station. Huginn and Muninn are a pair of ravens in Norse mythology.

A total of 400,000,000 kr, about (US$47,000,000) with exchange rate at the time, has been invested in the mission. Saab was the largest private investor in the mission.

Swedish National Space Agency together with Swedish researchers provided a lot of suggestions for research to undertake in space during Wandt's mission. Research planned during the space mission included stem cell research led by Uppsala University and improved cognition research led by KTH Royal Institute of Technology.

The Axiom Mission 3 took place 18 January 2024 to 9 February 2024 and included 18 days stay at International Space Station.
