= List of cargo dragons =

List of cargo dragons may refer to:

- The list of SpaceX Dragon Cargo vehicles
- The list of cargo vehicle variants of the SpaceX Dragon 2 vehicle
