= Digital Solid State Propulsion =

American Aerospace Company

- Industry: Aerospace
- Founded: Nevada (October 2005)
- Headquarters: Reno, United States
- Area served: U.S.
- Services: microthruster propulsion technology
- Website: dsspropulsion.com

Digital Solid State Propulsion (DSSP) is an aerospace company developing microthruster propulsion technology for small satellites. DSSP's technology utilizes Electric Solid Propellants (ESPs) to enable small satellites to make orbital maneuvers that have generally not been possible in the very small, mass-constrained satellites such as CubeSats and nanosats.

DSSP's first flight was aboard the NRL SPINSAT, launched as a secondary payload on SpaceX CRS-4 and deployed from the Kibo module airlock on 28 November 2014. NASA safety experts approved the mission because the satellite's 12 thruster-clusters burn an inert solid fuel, that only ignite when an electric charge is passed across it.

In July 2012, DSSP won second place in the 2012 NewSpace Business Plan Competition in Silicon Valley, sponsored by the Space Frontier Foundation.
