= SpaceX CRS-20 =

2020 American resupply spaceflight to the ISS

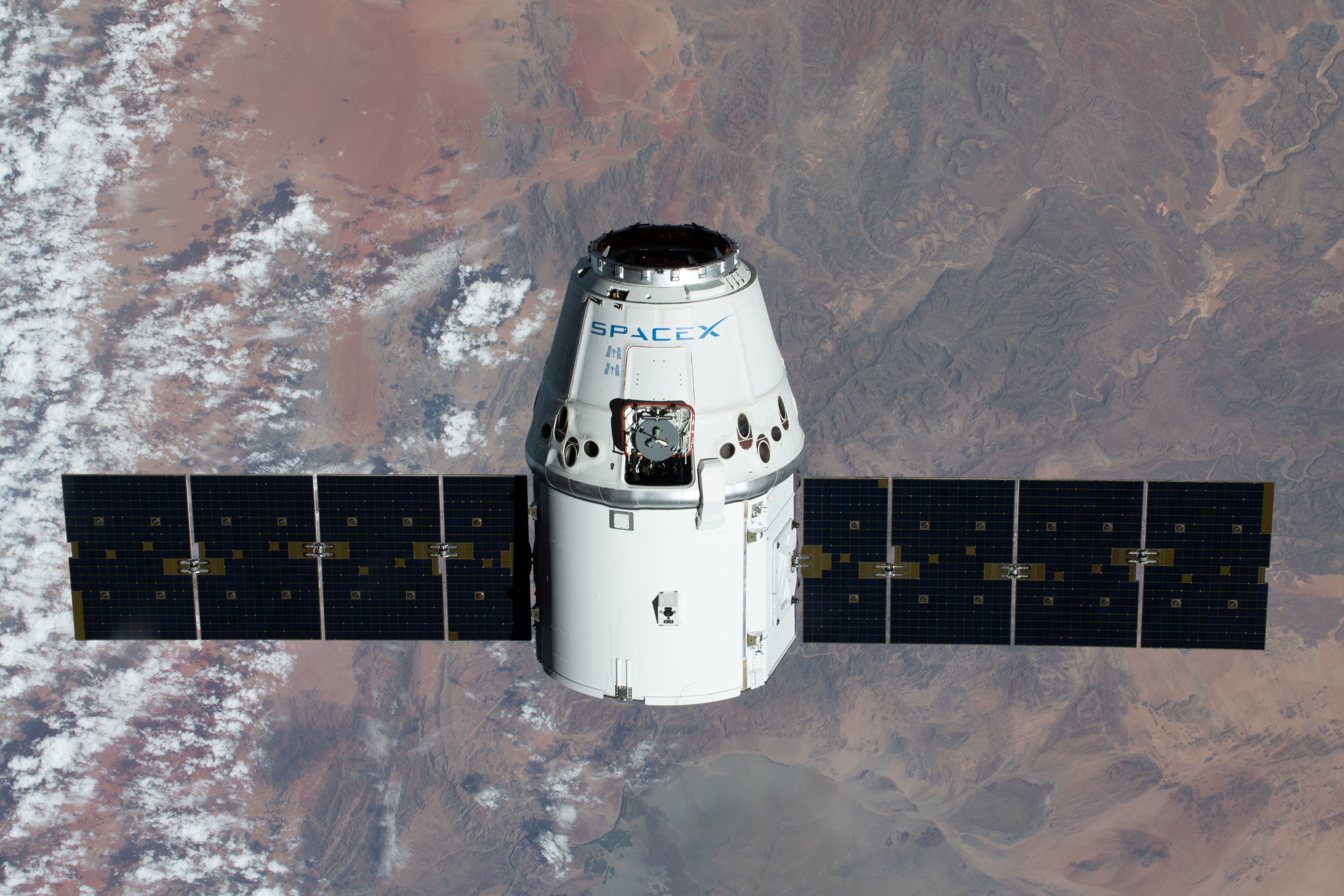
- C112 approaches the ISS
- Names: SpX-20
- Mission type: ISS resupply
- Operator: SpaceX
- COSPAR ID: 2020-016A
- SATCAT no.: 45341
- Mission duration: 31 days, 13 hours, 59 minutes

Spacecraft properties
- Spacecraft: Dragon 1 C112
- Spacecraft type: Dragon 1
- Manufacturer: SpaceX
- Dry mass: 4,200 kg (9,300 lb)
- Dimensions: Height: 6.1 m (20 ft); Diameter: 3.7 m (12 ft)

Start of mission
- Launch date: 7 March 2020, 04:50:31 UTC
- Rocket: Falcon 9 Block 5 B1059-2
- Launch site: Cape Canaveral, SLC-40

End of mission
- Disposal: Recovered
- Landing date: 7 April 2020, 18:50 UTC
- Landing site: Pacific Ocean

Orbital parameters
- Reference system: Geocentric orbit
- Regime: Low Earth orbit
- Inclination: 51.66°

Berthing with ISS
- Berthing port: Harmony nadir
- RMS capture: 9 March 2020, 10:25 UTC
- Berthing date: 9 March 2020, 12:18 UTC
- Unberthing date: 7 April 2020, 10:30 UTC
- RMS release: 7 April 2020, 13:06 UTC
- Time berthed: 29 days

Cargo
- Mass: 1,977 kg (4,359 lb)
- Pressurised: 1,509 kg (3,327 lb)
- Unpressurised: 468 kg (1,032 lb)
- Fuel: 705 kg (1,554 lb)
- Gaseous: 50 kg (110 lb)
- Water: 420 kg (930 lb)
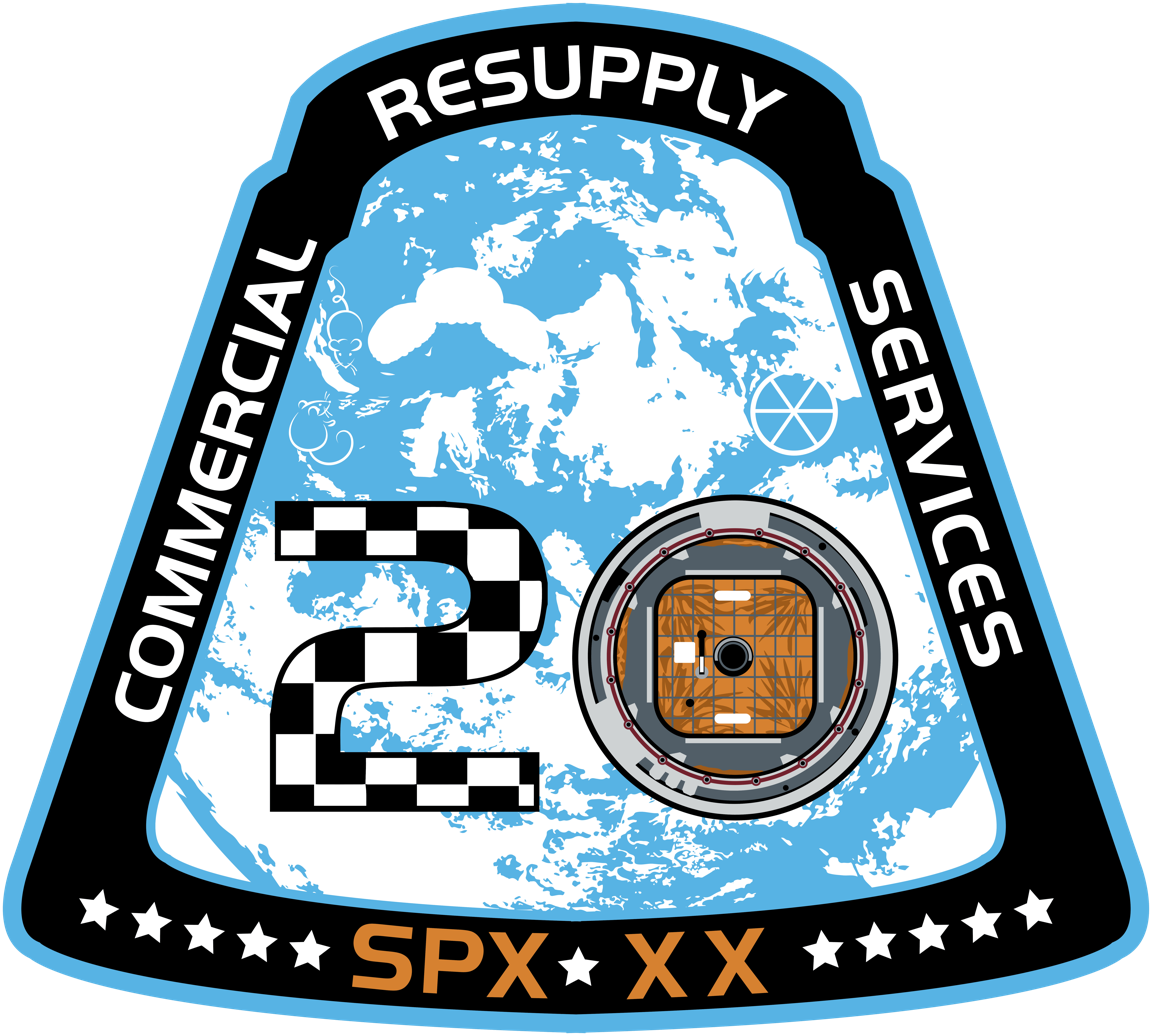
- SpaceX CRS-20 mission patch Commercial Resupply Services Cargo Dragon

SpaceX CRS-20, also known as SpX-20, was a Commercial Resupply Services mission to the International Space Station (ISS) launched on 7 March 2020. The mission was contracted by NASA and flown by SpaceX. It was the final flight of Dragon 1 and concluded the NASA Commercial Resupply Services (CRS-1) contract extension.

The second contract (CRS-2) was awarded in January 2016 and began with SpaceX CRS-21 in December 2020 using Cargo Dragon.

== History ==
In February 2016, it was announced that NASA had awarded a contract extension to SpaceX for five additional CRS missions (CRS-16 to CRS-20). A June 2016 NASA OIG report indicated the mission was manifested for 2019, but by June 2019 the launch had been pushed back to March 2020.

As the final flight of Dragon 1, CRS-20 concluded NASA's initial Commercial Resupply Services contract. Across the contract's 19 successful missions, Dragon carried 43,000 kg (94,000 pounds) of cargo to the International Space Station, and returned about 33,000 kg (74,000 pounds) of equipment and specimens to Earth.

== Mission ==
CRS-20 utilized Dragon capsule C112, which previously flew to the ISS on CRS-10 and CRS-16. It was launched aboard Falcon 9 from Space Launch Complex 40 at 4:50 UTC on 7 March 2020. The first stage booster, B1059.2, previously supported the CRS-19 mission.

Dragon arrived at the ISS on 9 March 2020 at 10:25 UTC and was captured by the station's robotic arm, marking the last capture of a Dragon spacecraft. Cargo Dragon, which replaced Dragon 1, docks directly with the space station.

== Payload ==
NASA contracted for the CRS-20 mission from SpaceX and therefore determined the primary payload, date of launch, and orbital parameters for the Dragon CRS. The CRS-20 mission carried 1977 kg of cargo to ISS.

- Science investigations: 960 kg
- Vehicle hardware: 219 kg
- Crew supplies: 273 kg
- Spacewalk equipment: 56 kg
- Computer resources: 1 kg
- Unpressurized payloads: Bartolomeo Platform 468 kg

Bartolomeo (named for the younger brother of explorer Christopher Columbus), is an external payload platform developed by Airbus and operated by the European Space Agency. Bartolomeo provides power and data transmission for up to 12 payload slots and is the first external commercial research platform to be installed on the ISS.

The Bartolomeo platform was removed from Dragon's trunk section and installed outside ISS on 2 April 2020. A spacewalk to route power and communication wiring to the Bartolomeo facility for activation has been postponed. The EVA was originally planned in mid-April 2020, but the space station will not be at full staffing level of six crew members until autumn 2020. When activated, Columbus will have a new outdoor deck to host a range of materials science, Earth observation and space science instruments.

Interoperable Radio System (IORS) is the foundation element of the Amateur Radio on the International Space Station (ARISS) next-generation radio system aboard the ISS. A total of 4 flight units are being built by the ARISS hardware team. The first IORS radio system launched aboard CRS-20 and was installed in the Columbus module by Expedition 63 Commander Chris Cassidy on 2 September 2020. System activation was first observed at 01:02 UTC on 2 September 2020 by ARISS control station and amateur radio ground operators. Initial operation of the new radio system began as an FM cross band repeater. A second IORS flight unit is expected to be launched on a later flight for installation in the Zvezda module.

Dragon was also packed with spare parts and replacement hardware for the space station's research facilities and life support systems. The components included upgraded hardware for the station's urine processing system, which converts human waste into drinking water. The new components allow NASA teams to test out modifications designed to extend the lifetime of the urine processing system's distillation assembly ahead of future missions to the Moon and Mars, which will require longer-lasting life support equipment.

== Gallery ==
SpaceX CRS-20
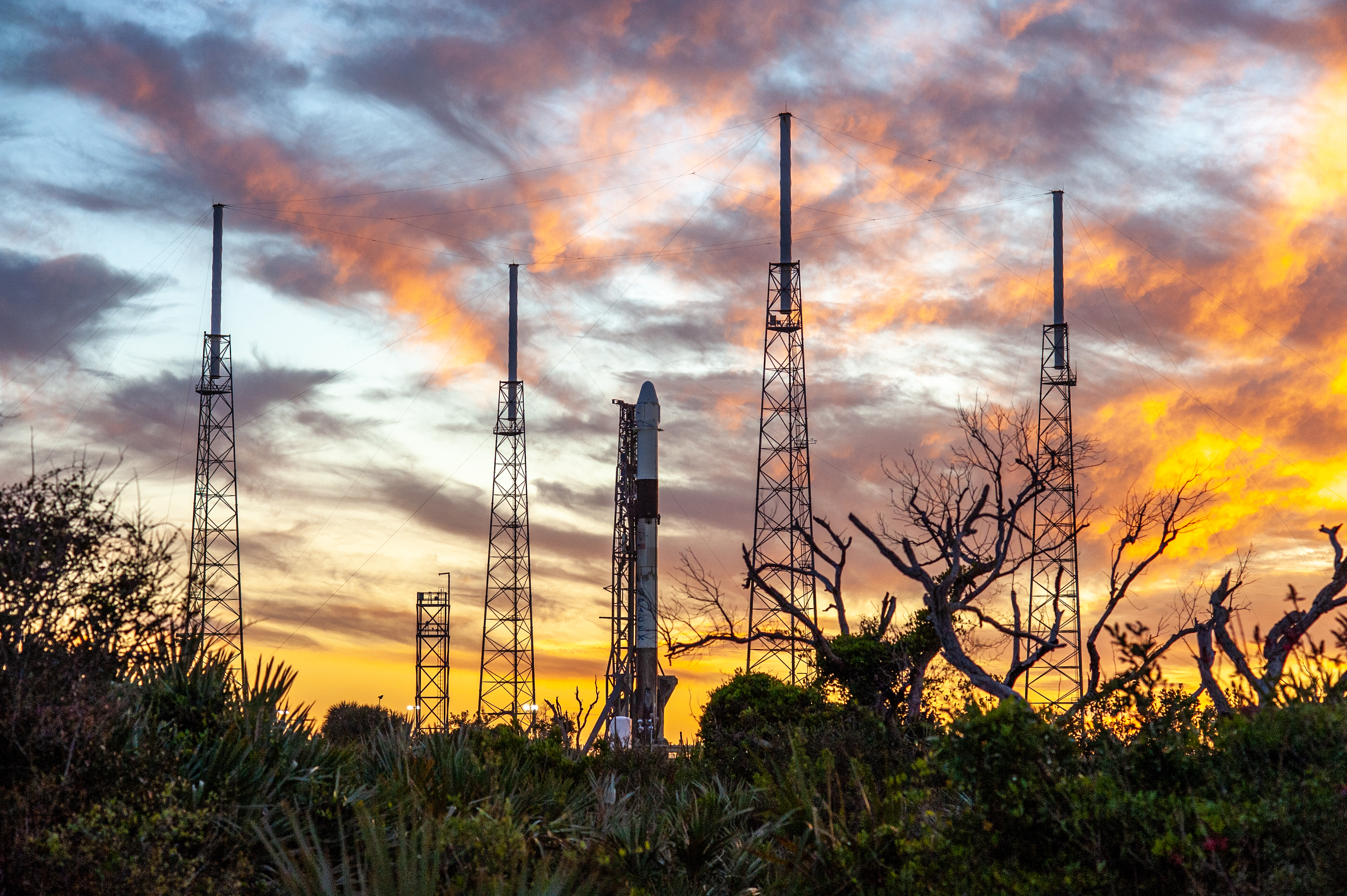
CRS-20 on the pad

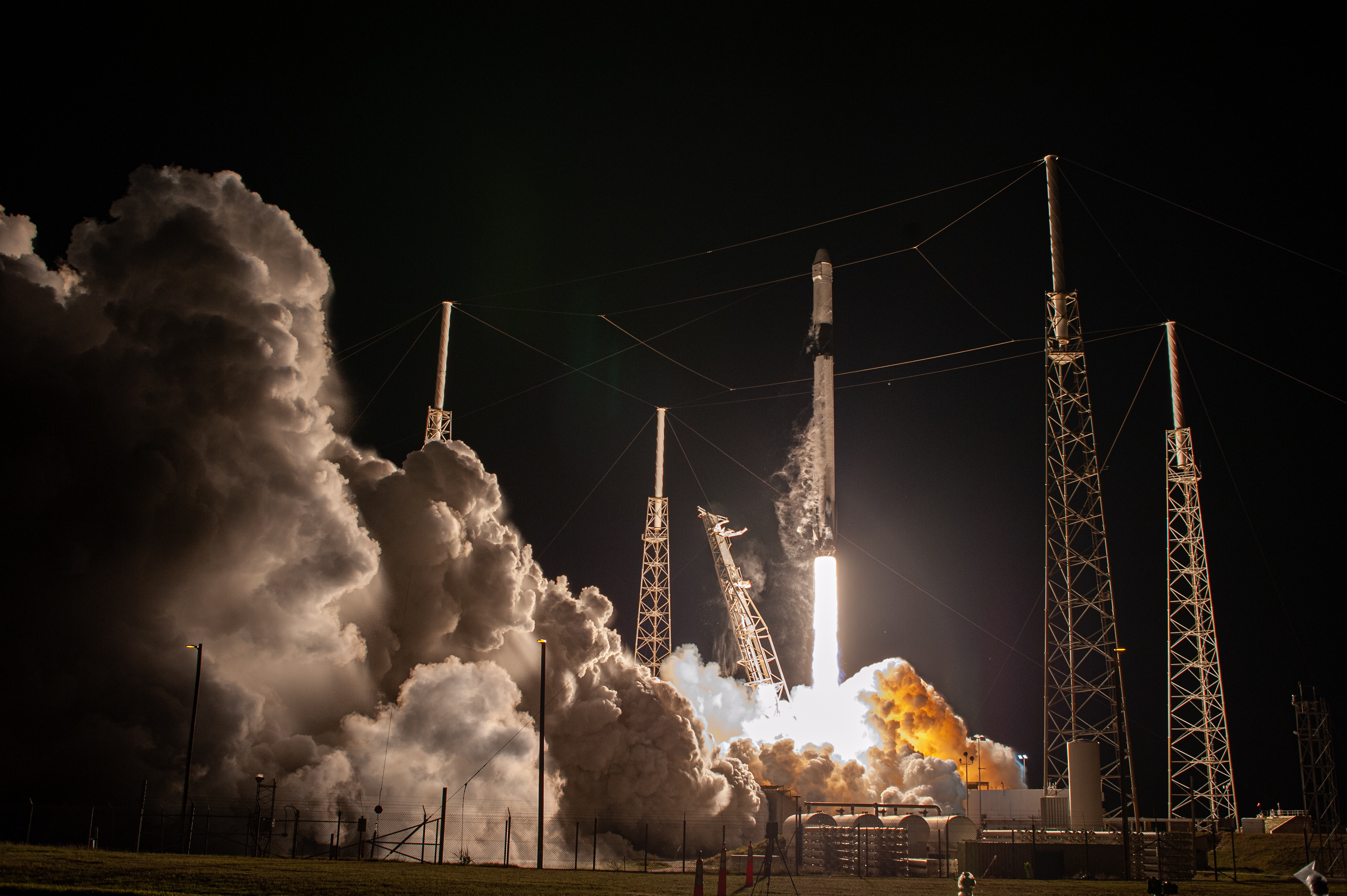
Launch of CRS-20

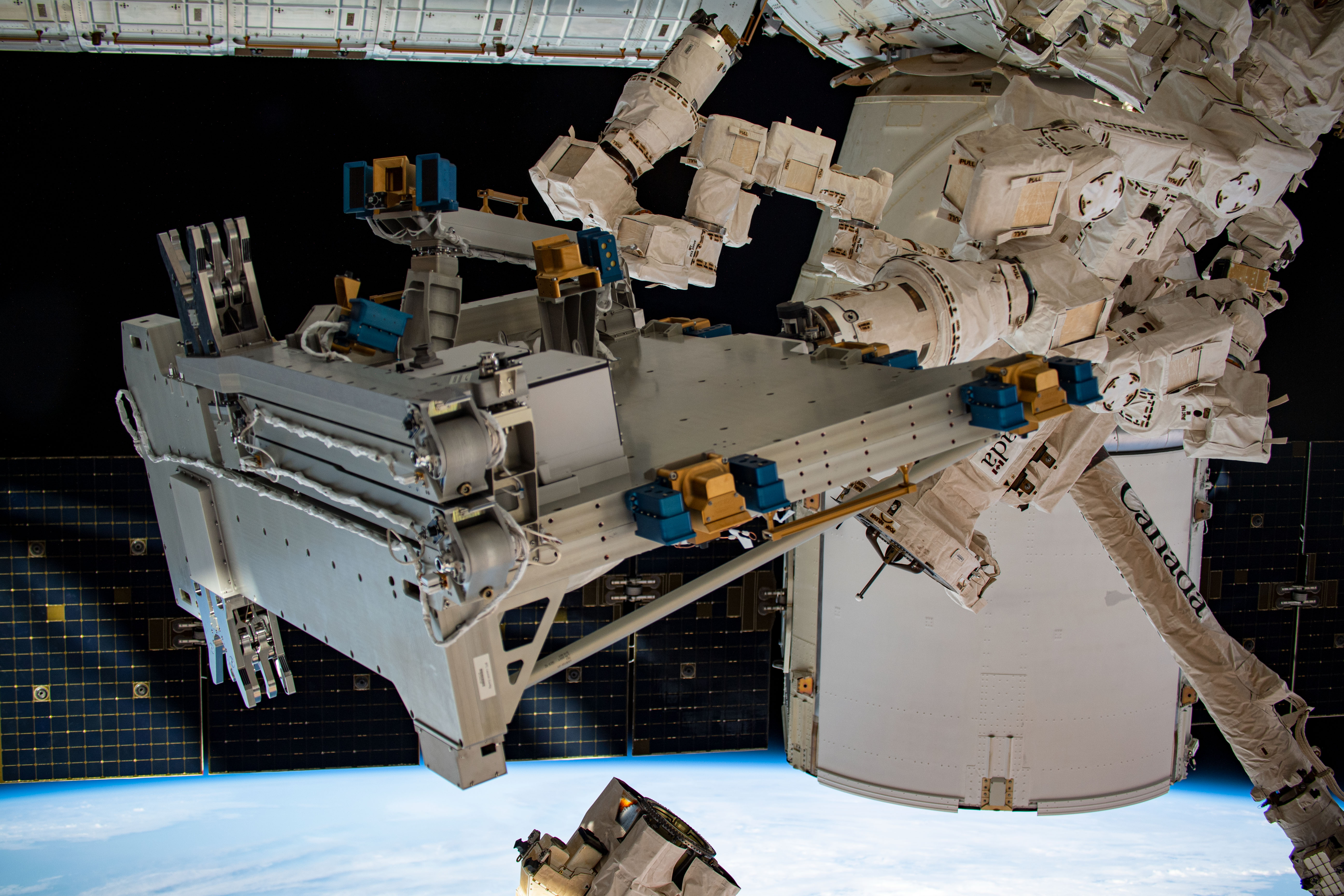
Bartolomeo removed from the trunk of Dragon

== See also ==
- Columbus External Payload Facility
- Amateur Radio on the International Space Station
- SpaceX CRS-21
- List of Falcon 9 launches
