= SpaceX Dragon 1 =

Partially reusable cargo space capsule

Dragon
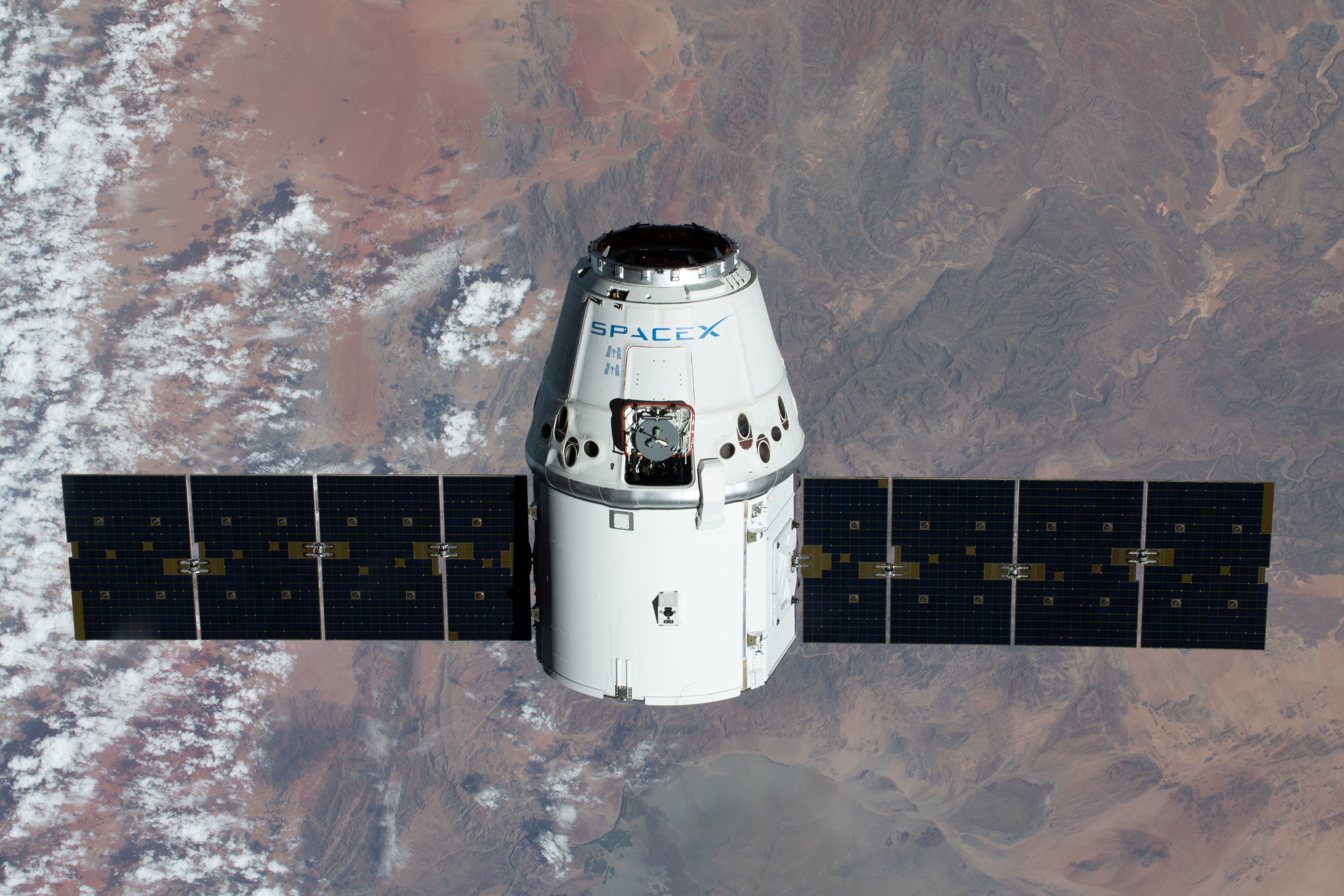
- Dragon approaching the International Space Station during the CRS-20 mission, the last flight of the Dragon 1
- Manufacturer: SpaceX
- Country of origin: United States
- Operator: SpaceX
- Applications: ISS logistics

Specifications
- Dry mass: 4,201 kg (9,262 lb)
- Payload capacity: 6,000 kg (13,000 lb) to orbit; 3,310 kg (7,300 lb) to ISS; 3,000 kg (6,600 lb) return cargo
- Crew capacity: 0
- Volume: 11 m^{3} (390 cu ft) pressurized; 14 m^{3} (490 cu ft) unpressurized; 34 m^{3} (1,200 cu ft) unpressurized with extended trunk

Dimensions
- Length: 6.1 m (20 ft)
- Diameter: 3.7 m (12 ft)

Production
- Status: Retired
- Built: 14
- Retired: 13
- Lost: 1
- Maiden launch: December 8, 2010 (first orbital flight); May 22, 2012 (first cargo delivery to ISS)
- Last launch: March 7, 2020

Related spacecraft
- Derivatives: DragonLab; Dragon 2; Dragon XL; Red Dragon

Thruster details
- Powered by: 18 × Draco
- Propellant: N_{2}O_{4} / CH_{6}N_{2}

SpaceX Dragon 1 is a class of fourteen partially reusable cargo spacecraft developed by SpaceX, an American private space transportation company. The spacecraft flew 23 missions between 2010 and 2020. Dragon was launched into orbit by the company's Falcon 9 launch vehicle to resupply the International Space Station (ISS). It was succeeded by the Dragon 2 spacecraft which has both crewed and cargo versions.

During its maiden flight in December 2010, Dragon became the first commercially built and operated spacecraft to be recovered successfully from orbit. On May 25, 2012, Dragon became the first commercial spacecraft to successfully rendezvous with and attach to the ISS. SpaceX contracted to deliver cargo to the ISS under NASA's Commercial Resupply Services program, and Dragon began regular cargo flights in October 2012. With the Dragon spacecraft and the Northrop Grumman’s Cygnus, NASA sought to increase its partnerships with domestic commercial aviation and aeronautics industry.

On June 3, 2017, the C106 capsule, largely assembled from previously flown components from the CRS-4 mission in September 2014, was launched again for the first time on CRS-11, after being refurbished.

The last flight of the Dragon 1 spacecraft launched March 7, 2020 (UTC) on cargo resupply mission (CRS-20) to International Space Station (ISS). This was the last mission of SpaceX's first Commercial Resupply Services (CRS-1) contract, and marked the retirement of the Dragon 1 fleet. Further SpaceX commercial resupply flights to ISS under the second Commercial Resupply Services (CRS-2) program use the Cargo Dragon variant of the Dragon 2 spacecraft, which is capable of fully automated docking with the ISS.

== History ==
SpaceX began developing the Dragon spacecraft in late 2004, making a public announcement in 2006 with a plan of entering service in 2009. Also in 2006, SpaceX won a contract to use Dragon for commercial resupply services to the International Space Station for the American federal space agency, NASA.

=== NASA ISS resupply contract ===
==== Commercial Orbital Transportation Services ====
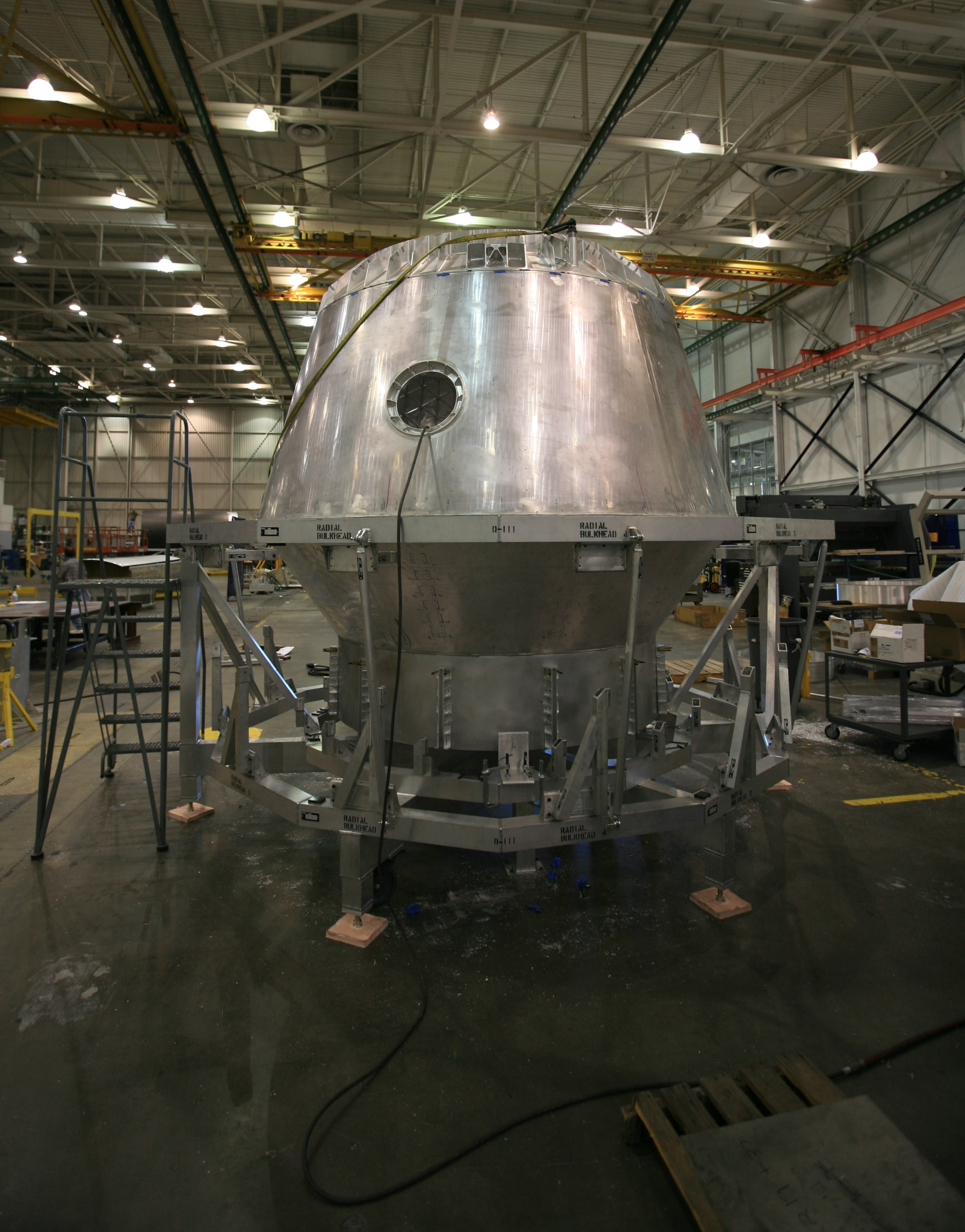
An early Dragon pressure vessel, photographed during factory tests in 2008.

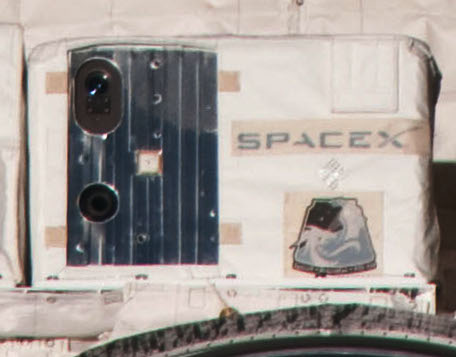
The DragonEye system on Space Shuttle Discovery during STS-133

In 2005, NASA solicited proposals for a commercial ISS resupply cargo vehicle to replace the then-soon-to-be-retired Space Shuttle, through its Commercial Orbital Transportation Services (COTS) development program. The Dragon space capsule was a part of SpaceX's proposal, submitted to NASA in March 2006. SpaceX's COTS proposal was issued as part of a team, which also included MD Robotics, the Canadian company that had built the ISS's Canadarm2.

On August 18, 2006, NASA announced that SpaceX had been chosen, along with Kistler Aerospace, to develop cargo launch services for the ISS. The initial plan called for three demonstration flights of SpaceX's Dragon spacecraft to be conducted between 2008 and 2010. SpaceX and Kistler were to receive up to US$278 million and US$207 million respectively, if they met all NASA milestones, but Kistler failed to meet its obligations, and its contract was terminated in 2007. NASA later re-awarded Kistler's contract to Orbital Sciences Corporation.

==== Commercial Resupply Services Phase 1 ====
On December 23, 2008, NASA awarded a US$1.6 billion Commercial Resupply Services (CRS-1) contract to SpaceX, with contract options that could potentially increase the maximum contract value to US$3.1 billion. The contract called for 12 flights, with an overall minimum of 20,000 kilograms (44,000 lb) of cargo to be carried to the ISS.

On February 23, 2009, SpaceX announced that its chosen phenolic-impregnated carbon ablator heat shield material, PICA-X, had passed heat stress tests in preparation for Dragon's maiden launch. The primary proximity-operations sensor for the Dragon spacecraft, the DragonEye, was tested in early 2009 during the STS-127 mission, when it was mounted near the docking port of the Space Shuttle Endeavour and used while the Shuttle approached the International Space Station. The DragonEye's lidar and thermography (thermal imaging) abilities were both tested successfully. The COTS UHF Communication Unit (CUCU) and Crew Command Panel (CCP) were delivered to the ISS during the late 2009 STS-129 mission. The CUCU allows the ISS to communicate with Dragon and the CCP allows ISS crew members to issue basic commands to Dragon. In summer 2009, SpaceX hired former NASA astronaut Ken Bowersox as vice president of their new Astronaut Safety and Mission Assurance Department, in preparation for crews using the spacecraft.

As a condition of the NASA CRS contract, SpaceX analyzed the orbital radiation environment on all Dragon systems, and how the spacecraft would respond to spurious radiation events. That analysis and the Dragon design – which uses an overall Fault tolerance triple redundant computer architecture, rather than individual radiation hardening of each computer processor – was reviewed by independent experts before being approved by NASA for the cargo flights.

During March 2015, it was announced that SpaceX had been awarded an additional three missions under Commercial Resupply Services Phase 1. These additional missions are SpaceX CRS-13, SpaceX CRS-14 and SpaceX CRS-15 and would cover the cargo needs of 2017. On February 24, 2016, SpaceNews disclosed that SpaceX had been awarded a further five missions under Commercial Resupply Services Phase 1. This additional tranche of missions had SpaceX CRS-16 and SpaceX CRS-17 manifested for FY2017 while SpaceX CRS-18, SpaceX CRS-19 and SpaceX CRS-20 and were notionally manifested for FY2018.

==== Commercial Resupply Services Phase 2 ====
The Commercial Resupply Services-2 (CRS-2) contract definition and solicitation period commenced in 2014. In January 2016, NASA awarded contracts to SpaceX, Orbital ATK, and Sierra Nevada Corporation for a minimum of six launches each, with missions planned until at least 2024. The maximum potential value of all the contracts was announced as US$14 billion, but the minimum requirements would be considerably less. No further financial information was disclosed.

CRS-2 launches began in late 2019.

==== Demonstration flights ====
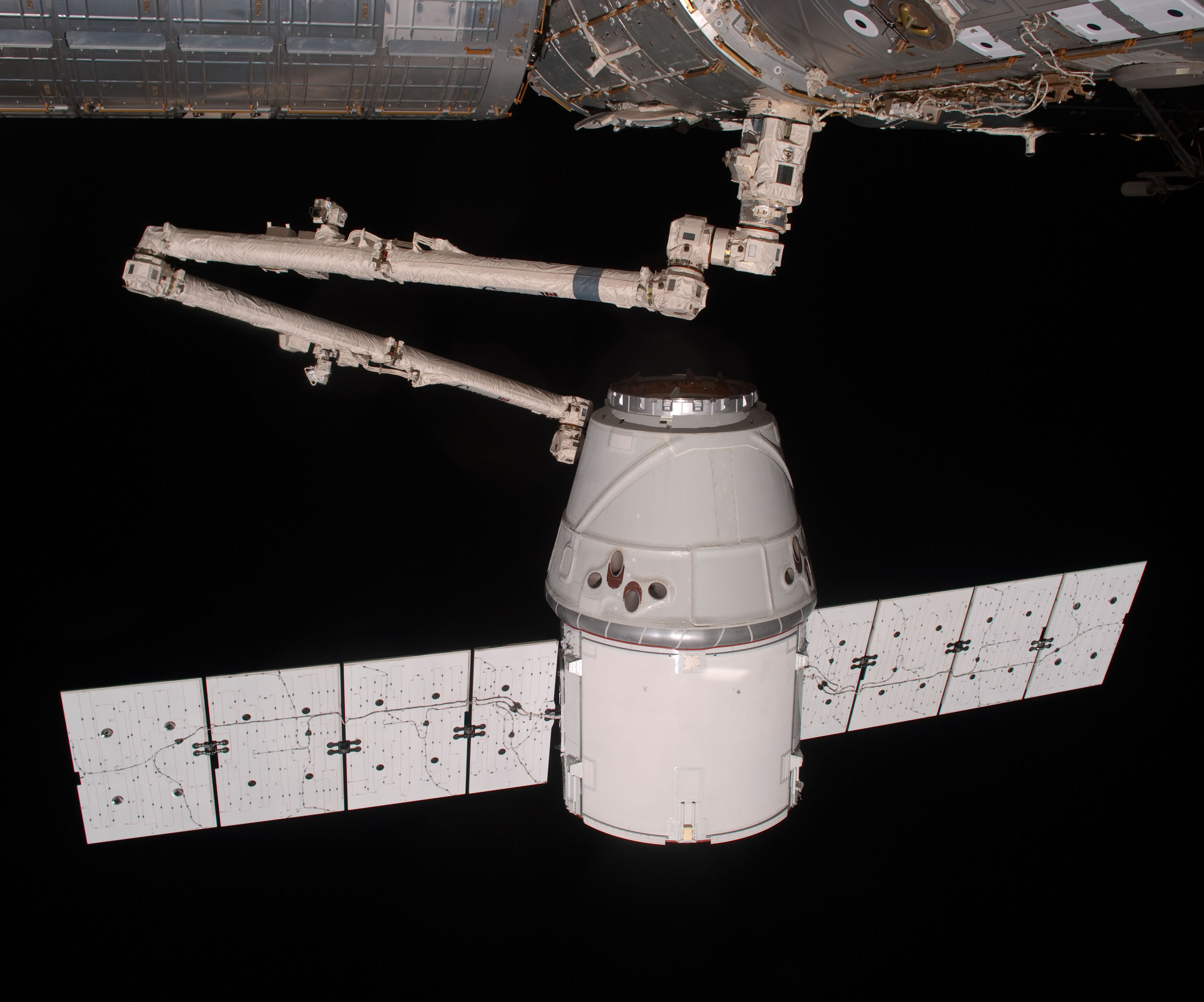
The CRS Dragon being berthed to the ISS by the Canadarm2 manipulator during the COTS 2 mission.

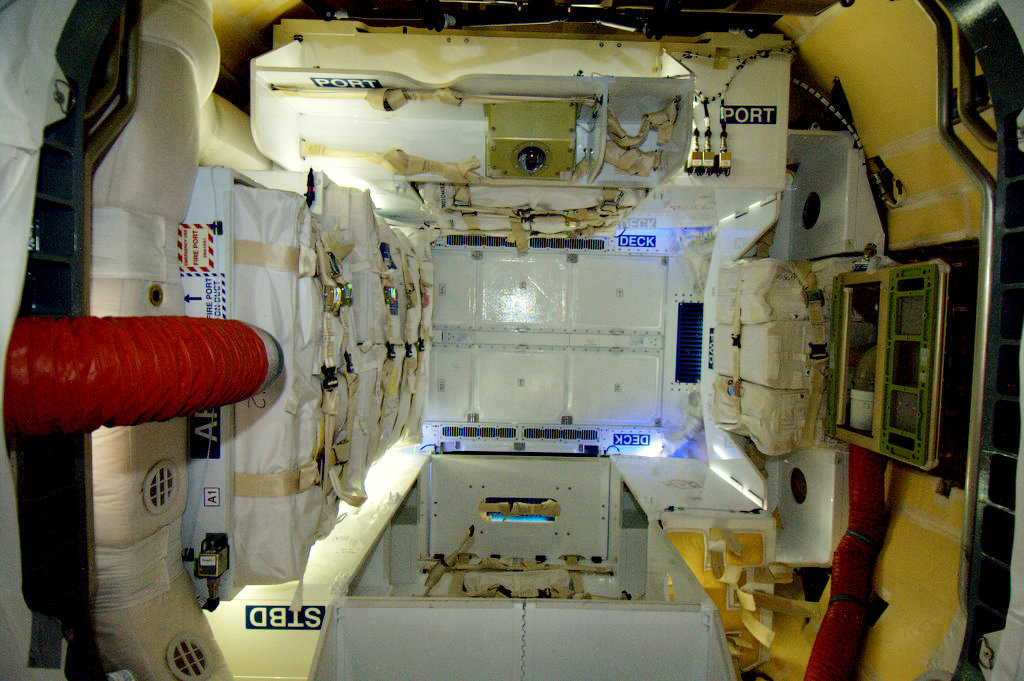
Interior of the COTS 2 Dragon capsule.

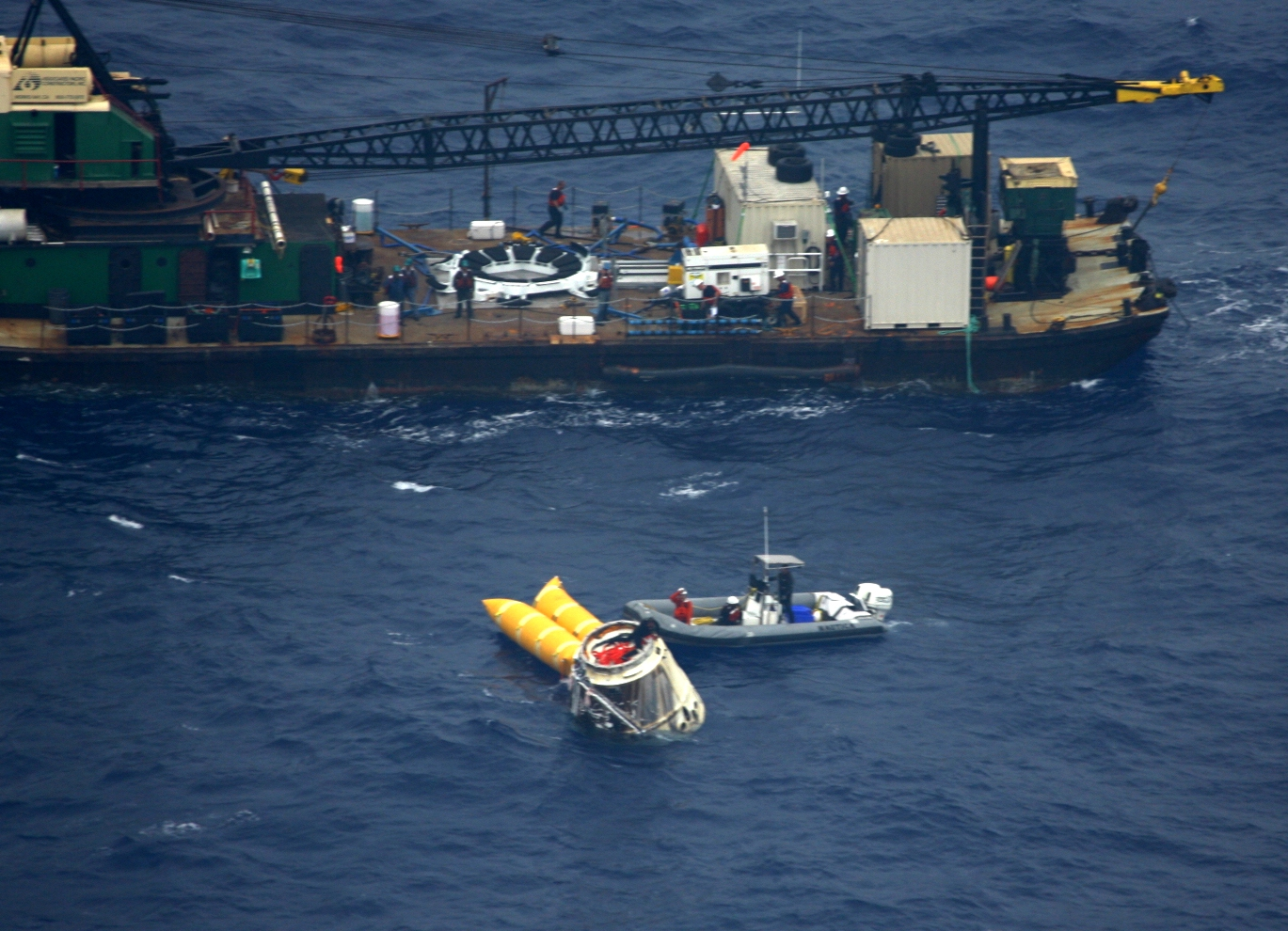
Recovery of the COTS 2 Dragon capsule on May 31, 2012.

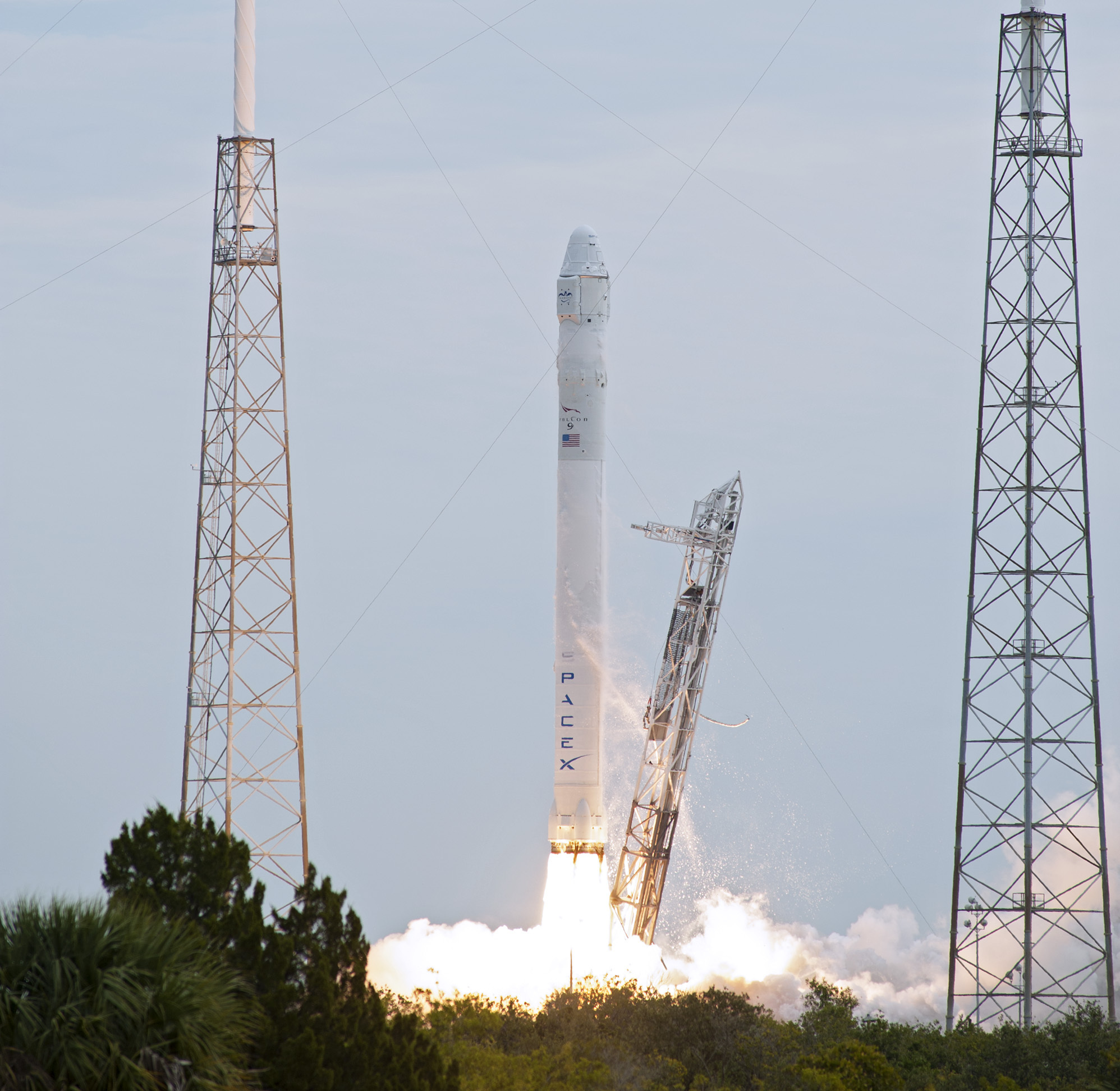
The Dragon spacecraft being launched on a Falcon 9 v1.0 rocket.

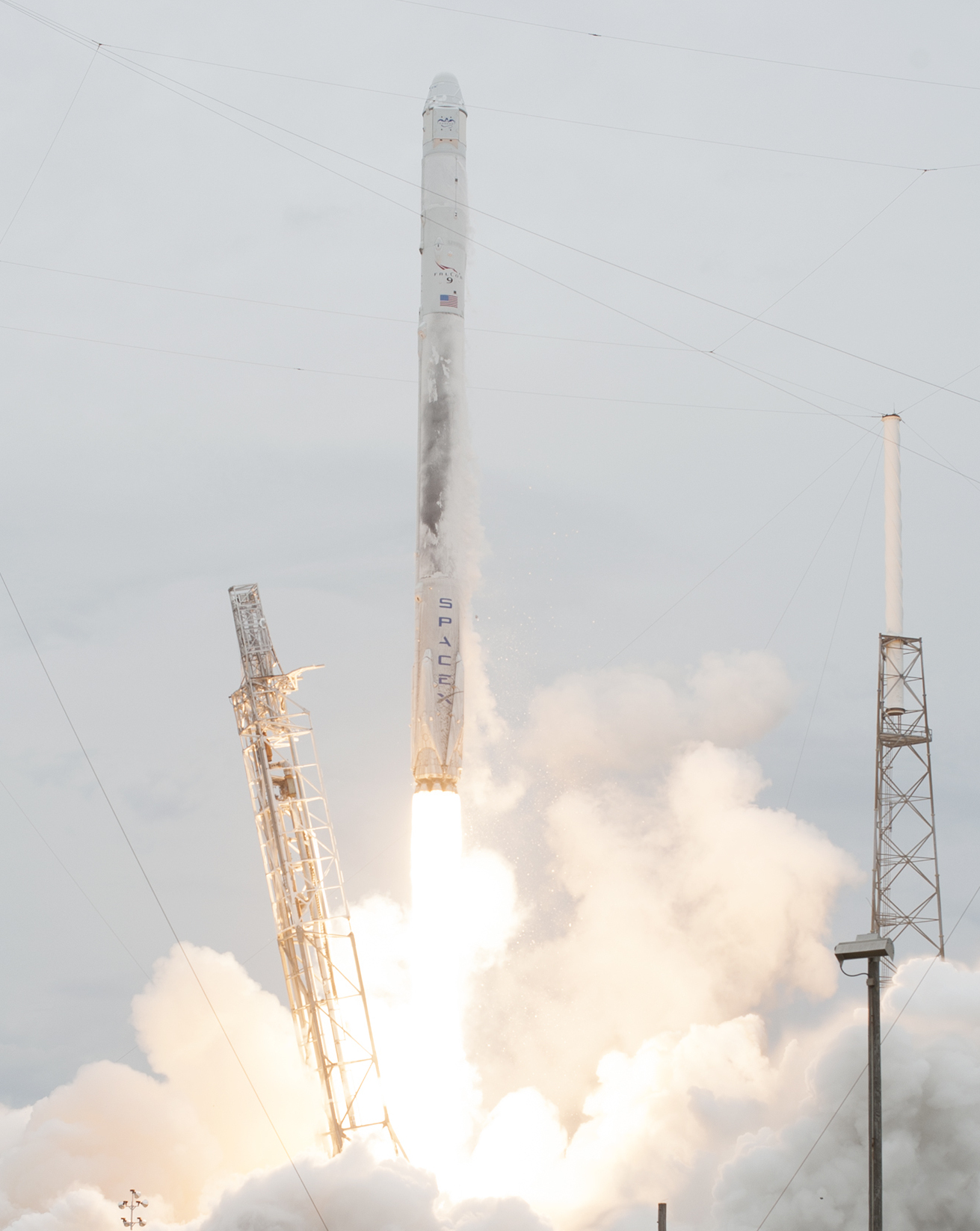
The Dragon spacecraft being launched on a Falcon 9 v1.1 rocket.

The first flight of the Falcon 9, a private flight, occurred in June 2010 and launched a stripped-down version of the Dragon capsule. This Dragon Spacecraft Qualification Unit had initially been used as a ground test bed to validate several of the capsule's systems. During the flight, the unit's primary mission was to relay aerodynamic data captured during the ascent. It was not designed to survive re-entry, and did not.

NASA contracted for three test flights from SpaceX, but later reduced that number to two. The first Dragon spacecraft launched on its first mission – contracted to NASA as COTS Demo Flight 1 – on December 8, 2010, and was successfully recovered following re-entry to Earth's atmosphere. The mission also marked the second flight of the Falcon 9 launch vehicle. The DragonEye sensor flew again on STS-133 in February 2011 for further on-orbit testing. In November 2010, the Federal Aviation Administration (FAA) had issued a re-entry license for the Dragon capsule, the first such license ever awarded to a commercial vehicle.

The second Dragon flight, also contracted to NASA as a demonstration mission, launched successfully on May 22, 2012, after NASA had approved SpaceX's proposal to combine the COTS 2 and 3 mission objectives into a single Falcon 9/Dragon flight, renamed COTS 2+. Dragon conducted orbital tests of its navigation systems and abort procedures, before being grappled by the ISS' Canadarm2 and successfully berthing with the station on May 25, 2012, to offload its cargo. Dragon returned to Earth on May 31, 2012, landing as scheduled in the Pacific Ocean, and was again successfully recovered.

On August 23, 2012, NASA Administrator Charles Bolden announced that SpaceX had completed all required milestones under the COTS contract, and was cleared to begin operational resupply missions to the ISS.

==== Returning research materials from orbit ====
Dragon spacecraft can return 3,500 kilograms (7,700 lb) of cargo to Earth, which can be all unpressurized disposal mass, or up to 3,000 kilograms (6,600 lb) of pressurized cargo, from the ISS, and is the only current spacecraft capable of returning to Earth with a significant amount of cargo. Other than the Russian Soyuz crew capsule, Dragon is the only currently operating spacecraft designed to survive re-entry. Because Dragon allows for the return of critical materials to researchers in as little as 48 hours from splashdown, it opens the possibility of new experiments on ISS that can produce materials for later analysis on ground using more sophisticated instrumentation. For example, CRS-12 returned mice that have spent time in orbit which will help give insight into how microgravity impacts blood vessels in both the brain and eyes, and in determining how arthritis develops.

==== Operational flights ====
Dragon was launched on its first operational CRS flight on October 8, 2012, and completed the mission successfully on October 28, 2012. NASA initially contracted SpaceX for 12 operational missions, and later extended the CRS contract with 8 more flights, bringing the total to 20 launches until 2019. In 2016, a new batch of 6 missions under the CRS-2 contract was assigned to SpaceX; those missions are scheduled to be launched between 2020 and 2024.

==== Reuse of previously flown capsules ====
CRS-11, SpaceX's eleventh CRS mission, was successfully launched on June 3, 2017, from Kennedy Space Center LC-39A, being the 100th mission to be launched from that pad. This mission was the first to re-fly a previously flown Dragon capsule. This mission delivered 2,708 kilograms of cargo to the International Space Station, including Neutron Star Interior Composition Explorer (NICER). The first stage of the Falcon 9 launch vehicle landed successfully at Landing Zone 1. This mission launched for the first time a refurbished Dragon capsule, serial number C106, which had flown in September 2014 on the CRS-4 mission, and was the first time since 2011 a reused spacecraft arrived at the ISS. Gemini SC-2 capsule is the only other reused capsule, but it was only reflown suborbitally in 1966.

CRS-12, SpaceX's twelfth CRS mission, was successfully launched on the first "Block 4" version of the Falcon 9 on August 14, 2017, from Kennedy Space Center LC-39A at the first attempt. This mission delivered 2,349 kilograms (5,179 lb) of pressurized mass and 961 kilograms (2,119 lb) unpressurized. The external payload manifested for this flight was the CREAM cosmic-ray detector. This was the last flight of a newly built Dragon capsule; further missions used refurbished spacecraft.

CRS-13, SpaceX's thirteenth CRS mission, was the second use of a previously flown Dragon capsule, but the first time in concordance with a reused first-stage booster. It was successfully launched on December 15, 2017, from Cape Canaveral Air Force Station Space Launch Complex 40 at the first attempt. This was the first launch from SLC-40 since the AMOS-6 pad anomaly. The booster was the previously flown core from the CRS-11 mission. This mission delivered 1,560 kilograms (3,440 lb) of pressurized mass and 645 kilograms (1,422 lb) unpressurized. It returned from orbit and splashdown on January 13, 2018, making it the first space capsule to be reflown to orbit more than once.

CRS-14, SpaceX's fourteenth CRS mission, was the third reuse of a previously flown Dragon capsule. It was successfully launched on April 2, 2018, from Cape Canaveral Air Force Station SLC-40. It was successfully berthed to the ISS on April 4, 2018, and remained berthed for a month before returning cargo and science experiments back to Earth.

CRS-15, CRS-16, CRS-17, CRS-18, CRS-19, and CRS-20 were all flown with previously flown capsules.

=== Crewed development program ===
In 2006, Elon Musk stated that SpaceX had built "a prototype flight crew capsule, including a thoroughly tested 30-man-day life-support system". A video simulation of the launch escape system's operation was released in January 2011. Musk stated in 2010 that the developmental cost of a crewed Dragon and Falcon 9 would be between US$800 million and US$1 billion. In 2009 and 2010, Musk suggested on several occasions that plans for a crewed variant of the Dragon were proceeding and had a two-to-three-year timeline to completion. SpaceX submitted a bid for the third phase of CCDev, CCiCap. This evolved into the Crew dragon variant of the SpaceX Dragon 2.

== Development funding ==
In 2014, SpaceX released the total combined development costs for both the Falcon 9 launch vehicle and the Dragon capsule. NASA provided US$396 million while SpaceX provided over US$450 million to fund both development efforts.

== Production ==
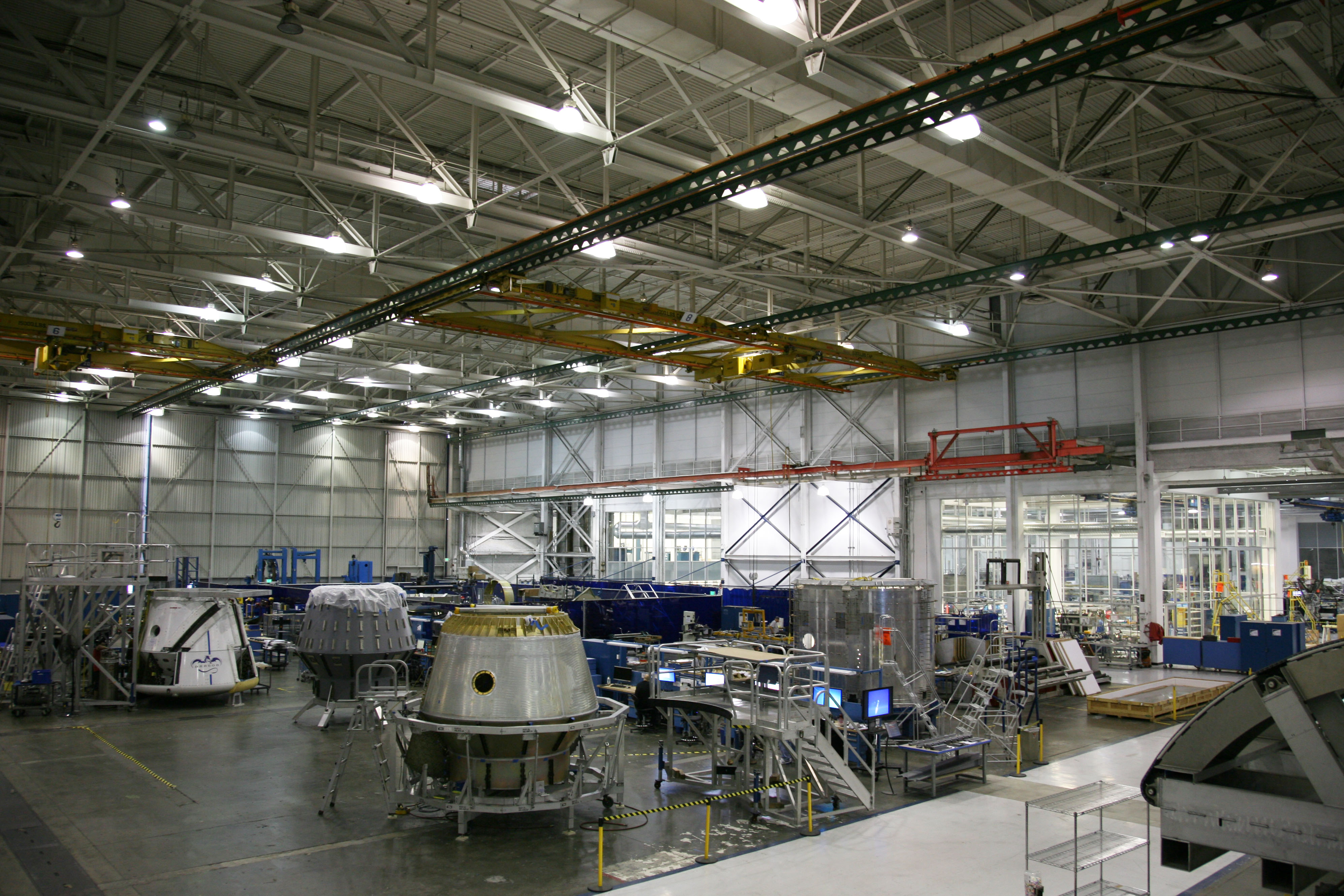
SpaceX Dragon capsules being manufactured at SpaceX's factory

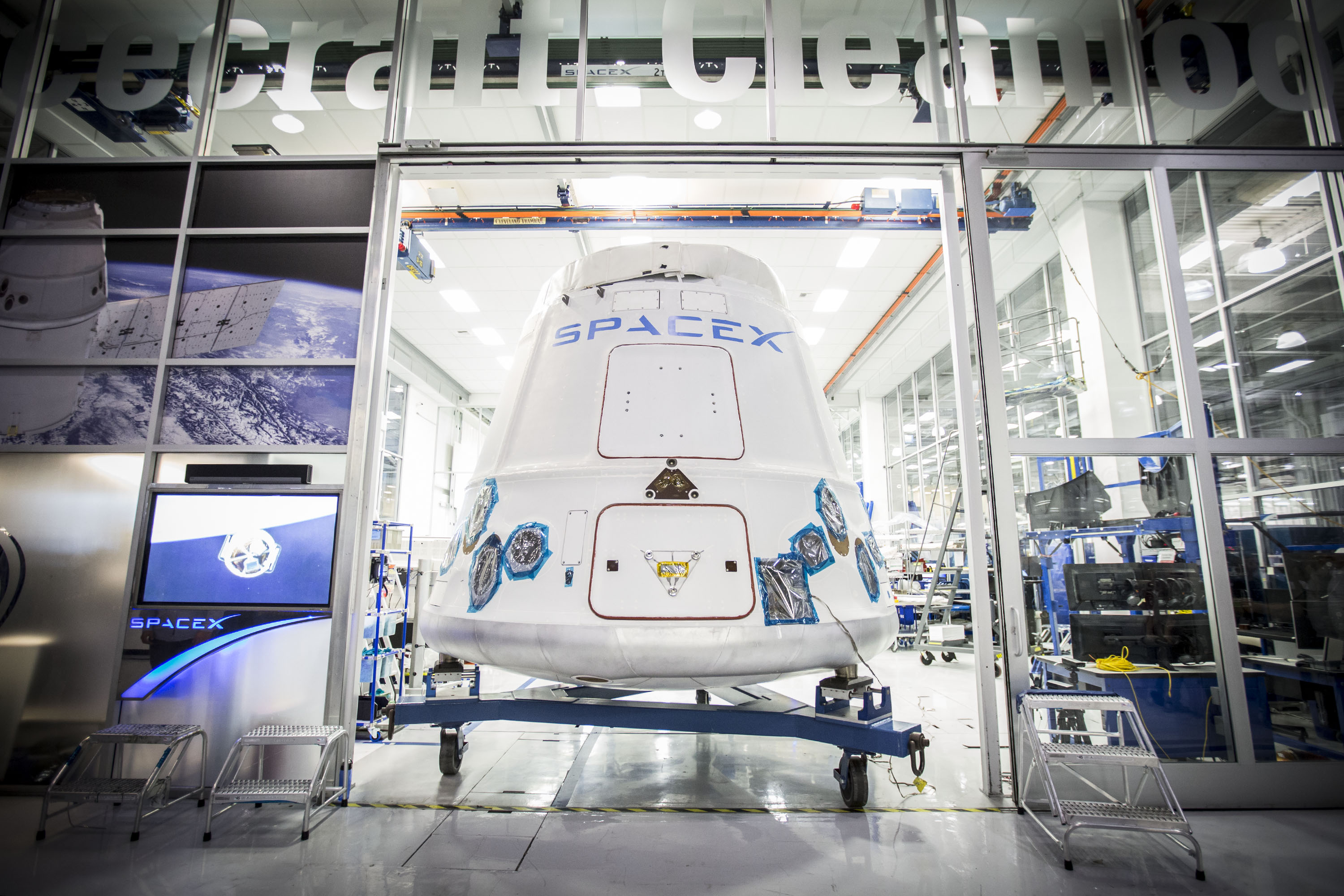
A Dragon capsule being shipped out of SpaceX HQ in Hawthorne, California, February 2015.

In December 2010, the SpaceX production line was reported to be manufacturing one new Dragon spacecraft and Falcon 9 rocket every three months. Elon Musk stated in a 2010 interview that he planned to increase production turnover to one Dragon every six weeks by 2012. Composite materials are extensively used in the spacecraft's manufacture to reduce weight and improve structural strength.

By September 2013, SpaceX total manufacturing space had increased to nearly 1,000,000 square feet (93,000 m^{2}) and the factory had six Dragons in various stages of production. SpaceX published a photograph showing the six, including the next four NASA Commercial Resupply Services (CRS-1) mission Dragons (CRS-3, CRS-4, CRS-5, CRS-6) plus the drop-test Dragon, and the pad-abort Dragon weldment for commercial crew program.

== Design ==
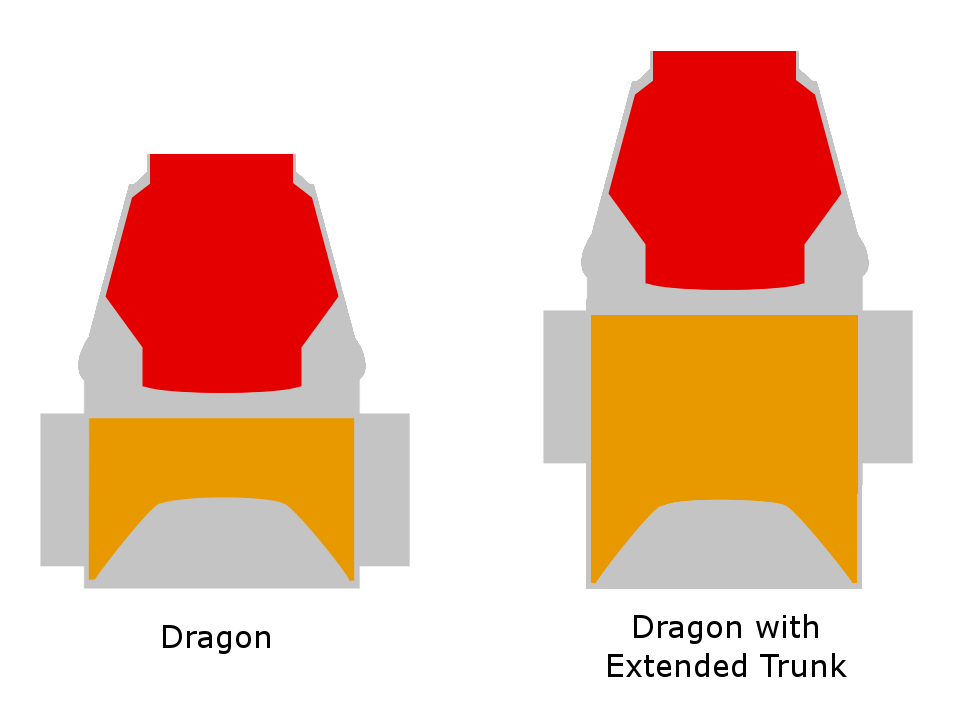
Drawing showing the pressurized (red) and unpressurized (orange) sections of Dragon.

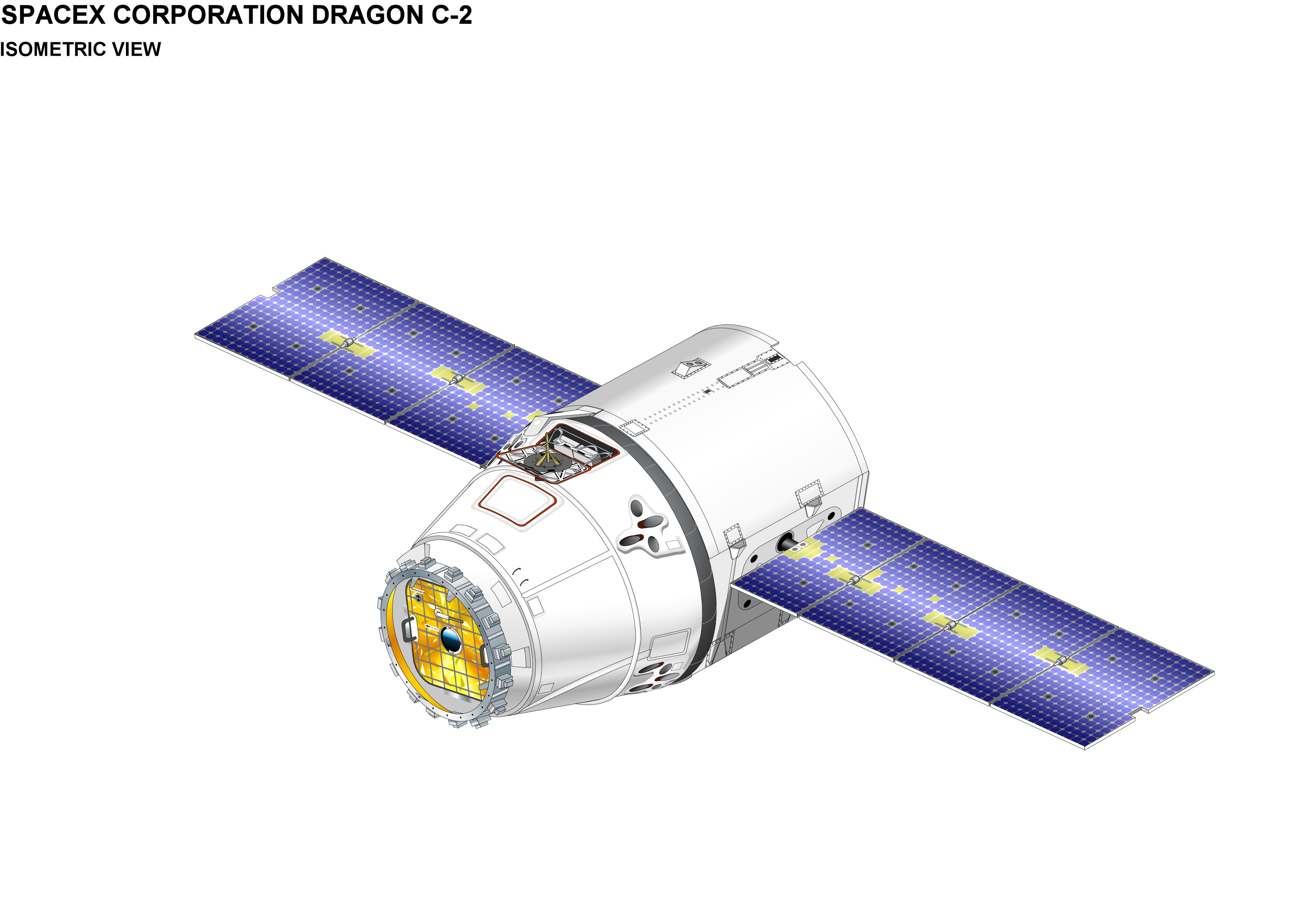
Isometric view of Dragon

The Dragon spacecraft consists of a nose-cone cap, a conventional blunt-cone ballistic capsule, and an unpressurized cargo-carrier trunk equipped with two solar arrays. The capsule uses a PICA-X heat shield, based on a proprietary variant of NASA's Phenolic impregnated carbon ablator (PICA) material, designed to protect the capsule during Earth atmospheric entry, even at high return velocities from Lunar and Martian missions. The Dragon capsule is re-usable, and can fly multiple missions. The trunk is not recoverable; it separates from the capsule before re-entry and burns up in Earth's atmosphere. The trunk section, which carries the spacecraft's solar panels and allows the transport of unpressurized cargo to the ISS, was first used for cargo on the SpaceX CRS-2 mission.

The spacecraft is launched atop a Falcon 9 booster. The Dragon capsule is equipped with 18 Draco thrusters. During its initial cargo and crew flights, the Dragon capsule will land in the Pacific Ocean and be returned to the shore by ship.

For the ISS Dragon cargo flights, the ISS's Canadarm2 grapples its Flight-Releasable Grapple Fixture and berths Dragon to the station's US Orbital Segment using a Common Berthing Mechanism (CBM). The CRS Dragon does not have an independent means of maintaining a breathable atmosphere for astronauts and instead circulates in fresh air from the ISS. For typical missions, Dragon is planned to remain berthed to the ISS for about 30 days.

The Dragon capsule can transport 3,310 kilograms (7,300 lb) of cargo, which can be all pressurized, all unpressurized, or a combination thereof. It can return to Earth 3,310 kilograms (7,300 lb), which can be all unpressurized disposal mass, or up to 3,310 kilograms (7,300 lb) of return pressurized cargo, driven by parachute limitations. There is a volume constraint of 14 cubic metres (490 cu ft) trunk unpressurized cargo and 11.2 cubic metres (400 cu ft) of pressurized cargo (up or down). The trunk was first used operationally on the Dragon's CRS-2 mission in March 2013. Its solar arrays produce a peak power of 4 kW.

The design was modified beginning with the fifth Dragon flight on the SpaceX CRS-3 mission to the ISS in March 2014. While the outer mold line of the Dragon was unchanged, the avionics and cargo racks were redesigned to supply substantially more electrical power to powered cargo devices, including the GLACIER freezer module and MERLIN freezer module freezer modules for transporting critical science payloads.

== Variants and derivatives ==
=== DragonLab ===
SpaceX planned to fly the Dragon spacecraft in a free-flying configuration, known as DragonLab. Its subsystems include propulsion, power, thermal and environmental control (ECLSS), avionics, communications, thermal protection, flight software, guidance and navigation systems, and entry, descent, landing, and recovery gear. It has a total combined upmass of 6,000 kilograms (13,000 lb) upon launch, and a maximum downmass of 3,000 kilograms (6,600 lb) when returning to Earth. In November 2014, there were two DragonLab missions listed on the SpaceX launch manifest: one in 2016 and another in 2018. However, these missions were removed from the manifest in early 2017, with no official SpaceX statement. The American Biosatellites once performed similar uncrewed payload-delivery functions, and the Russian Bion satellites still continue to do so.

== List of vehicles ==
Dragon 1 vehicles
| Serial | Type | Status | Flights | Time in flight | Notes |
|---|---|---|---|---|---|
| C101 | Prototype | Retired | 1 | 3h, 19m | On display in Hawthorne, California at SpaceX's facility. |
| C102 | Production | Retired | 1 | 9d, 7h, 57m | On display in Merritt Island, Florida at Kennedy Space Center Visitor Complex. |
| C103 | Production | Retired | 1 | 20d, 18h, 47m | |
| C104 | Production | Retired | 1 | 25d, 1h, 24m | |
| C105 | Production | Retired | 1 | 29d, 23h, 38m | |
| C106 | Production | Retired | 3 | 97d, 3h, 2m | |
| C107 | Production | Scrapped | 1 | 31d, 14h, 56m | |
| C108 | Production | Retired | 3 | 98d, 18h, 50m | On display in Los Angeles, California at the California Science Center. |
| C109 | Production | Destroyed | 1 | 2m, 19s | Destroyed upon impact with the ocean after the in-flight explosion of the Falcon 9 first stage during CRS-7. |
| C110 | Production | Retired | 2 | 65d, 20h, 20m | |
| C111 | Production | Retired | 2 | 74d, 23h, 38m | |
| C112 | Production | Retired | 3 | 99d, 1h | On display in Waco, Texas at the Bledsoe-Miller STEAM Center. |
| C113 | Production | Retired | 2 | 64d, 12h, 4m | On display in Chicago, Illinois at the Museum of Science and Industry. |

== List of missions ==
| Mission and Patch | Capsule | Launch date (UTC) | Remarks | Time at ISS | Outcome |
|---|---|---|---|---|---|
| COTS-1 | C101 | December 8, 2010 | First Dragon mission, second Falcon 9 launch. Mission tested the orbital maneuvering and reentry of the Dragon capsule. After recovery, the capsule was put on display at SpaceX's headquarters. | —N/a | Success |
| COTS-2 | C102 | May 22, 2012 | First Dragon mission with complete spacecraft, first rendezvous mission, first berthing with ISS. After recovery, the capsule was put on display at Kennedy Space Center Visitor Complex. | 5d 17h 47m | Success |
| CRS-1 | C103 | October 8, 2012 | First Commercial Resupply Services (CRS) mission for NASA, first non-demo mission. Falcon 9 rocket suffered a partial engine failure during launch but was able to deliver Dragon into orbit. However, a secondary payload did not reach its correct orbit. | 17d 22h 16m | Success; launch anomaly |
| CRS-2 | C104 | March 1, 2013 | First launch of Dragon using trunk section to carry cargo. Launch was successful, but anomalies occurred with the spacecraft's thrusters shortly after liftoff. Thruster function was later restored and orbit corrections were made, but the spacecraft's rendezvous with the ISS was delayed from its planned date of March 2 until March 3, 2013, when it was successfully berthed with the Harmony module. Dragon splashed down safely in the Pacific Ocean on March 26, 2013. | 22d 18h 14m | Success; spacecraft anomaly |
| CRS-3 | C105 | April 18, 2014 | First launch of the redesigned Dragon: same outer mold line with the avionics and cargo racks redesigned to supply substantially more electric power to powered cargo devices, including additional cargo freezers (GLACIER freezer module (GLACIER), Minus Eighty Degree Laboratory Freezer for ISS (MERLIN)) for transporting critical science payloads. Launch rescheduled for April 18, 2014, due to a helium leak. | 27d 21h 49m | Success |
| CRS-4 | C106.1 | September 21, 2014 | First launch of a Dragon with living payload, in the form of 20 mice which are part of a NASA experiment to study the physiological effects of long-duration spaceflight. | 31d 22h 41m | Success |
| CRS-5 | C107 | January 10, 2015 | Cargo manifest change due to Cygnus CRS Orb-3 launch failure. Carried the Cloud Aerosol Transport System experiment. | 29d 3h 17m | Success |
| CRS-6 | C108.1 | April 14, 2015 | The robotic SpaceX Dragon capsule splashed down in the Pacific Ocean on May 21, 2015. | 33d 20h | Success |
| CRS-7 | C109 | June 28, 2015 | This mission was supposed to deliver the first of two International Docking Adapters (IDA) to modify Russian APAS-95 docking ports to the newer international standard. The payload was lost due to an in-flight explosion of the carrier rocket. The Dragon capsule survived the blast; it could have deployed its parachutes and performed a splashdown in the ocean, but its software did not take this situation into account. | —N/a | Failure |
| CRS-8 | C110.1 | April 8, 2016 | Delivered the Bigelow Aerospace Bigelow Expandable Activity Module (BEAM) module in the unpressurized cargo trunk. First stage landed for the first time successfully on sea barge. A month later, the Dragon capsule was recovered, carrying a downmass containing astronaut's Scott Kelly biological samples from his year-long mission on board of ISS. | 30d 21h 3m | Success |
| CRS-9 | C111.1 | July 18, 2016 | Delivered docking adapter International Docking Adapter (IDA-2) to modify the ISS docking port Pressurized Mating Adapter (PMA-2) for Commercial Crew spacecraft. Longest time a Dragon Capsule was in space. | 36d 6h 57m | Success |
| CRS-10 | C112.1 | February 19, 2017 | First launch from Kennedy Space Center LC-39A since STS-135 in mid-2011. Berthing to the ISS was delayed by a day due to software incompatibilities. | 23d 8h 8m | Success |
| CRS-11 | C106.2 | June 3, 2017 | The first mission to re-fly a recovered Dragon capsule (previously flown on SpaceX CRS-4). | 27d 1h 53m | Success |
| CRS-12 | C113.1 | August 14, 2017 | Last mission to use a new Dragon 1 spacecraft. | 31d 6h | Success |
| CRS-13 | C108.2 | December 15, 2017 | Second reuse of Dragon capsule. First NASA mission to fly aboard reused Falcon 9. First reuse of this specific Dragon spacecraft. | 25d 21h 21m | Success |
| CRS-14 | C110.2 | April 2, 2018 | Third reuse of a Dragon capsule, only necessitated replacing its heatshield, trunk, and parachutes. Returned over 4000 pounds of cargo. First reuse of this specific Dragon spacecraft. | 30d 16h | Success |
| CRS-15 | C111.2 | June 29, 2018 | Fourth reuse. First reuse of this specific Dragon spacecraft. | 32d 45m | Success |
| CRS-16 | C112.2 | December 5, 2018 | Fifth reuse. First reuse of this specific Dragon spacecraft. The first-stage booster landing failed due to a grid fin hydraulic pump stall on reentry. | 36d 4h | Success |
| CRS-17 | C113.2 | May 4, 2019 | Sixth reuse. First reuse of this specific Dragon spacecraft. | 27d 23h 2m | Success |
| CRS-18 | C108.3 | July 24, 2019 | Seventh reuse. First capsule to make a third flight. After recovery, the capsule was put on display at the California Science Center in Los Angeles. | 30d 20h 24m | Success |
| CRS-19 | C106.3 | December 5, 2019 | Eighth reuse. Second capsule to make a third flight. | 29d 19h 54m | Success |
| CRS-20 | C112.3 | March 7, 2020 | Ninth reuse. Third capsule to make a third flight. Final launch of this Dragon version (Dragon 1), with following launches using SpaceX Dragon 2. | 28d 22h 12m | Success |

== Specifications ==
Size comparison of the Apollo (left), Orion (center) and Dragon (right) capsules

=== DragonLab ===
The following specifications are published by SpaceX for the non-NASA, non-ISS commercial flights of the refurbished Dragon capsules, listed as "DragonLab" flights on the SpaceX manifest. The specifications for the NASA-contracted Dragon Cargo were not included in the 2009 DragonLab datasheet.

==== Pressure vessel ====
- 10 cubic metres (350 cu ft) interior pressurized, environmentally controlled, payload volume.
- Onboard environment: 10–46 °C (50–115 °F); relative humidity 25~75%; 13.9~14.9 psia air pressure (958.4~1027 hPa).

==== Unpressurized sensor bay (recoverable payload) ====
- 0.1 cubic metres (3.5 cu ft) unpressurized payload volume.
- Sensor bay hatch opens after orbit insertion to allow full sensor access to the outer space environment, and closes before Earth atmosphere re-entry.

==== Unpressurized trunk (non-recoverable) ====
- 14 cubic metres (490 cu ft) payload volume in the 2.3 metres (7 ft 7 in) trunk, aft of the pressure vessel heat shield, with optional trunk extension to 4.3 metres (14 ft) total length, payload volume increases to 34 cubic metres (1,200 cu ft).
- Supports sensors and space apertures up to 3.5 metres (11 ft) in diameter.

==== Power, communication and command systems ====
- Power: twin solar panels providing 1500 watts average, 4000 watts peak, at 28 and 120 V_{DC}.
- Spacecraft communication: commercial standard RS-422 and military standard 1553 serial I/O, plus Ethernet communications for IP-addressable standard payload service.
- Command uplink: 300 kbit/s.
- Telemetry/data downlink: 300 Mbit/s standard, fault-tolerant S-band telemetry and video transmitters.

=== Radiation tolerance ===
Dragon uses a "radiation-tolerant" design in the electronic hardware and software that make up its flight computers. The system uses three pairs of computers, each constantly checking on the others, to instantiate a fault-tolerant design. In the event of a radiation upset or soft error, one of the computer pairs will perform a soft reboot. Including the flight computers, Dragon employs 18 triply redundant processing units, for a total of 54 processors.

== See also ==
- Comparison of space station cargo vehicles
- List of human spaceflight programs
- Space Shuttle successors
- Cargo Dragon C208 and C209

=== Comparable vehicles ===
==== Cargo ====
- Automated Transfer Vehicle – Uncrewed cargo spacecraft developed by the European Space Agency
- Cygnus – Uncrewed cargo spacecraft developed by Orbital Sciences
- Dream Chaser – US reusable automated cargo lifting-body spaceplane
- H-II Transfer Vehicle – Uncrewed cargo spacecraft developed by JAXA
- Progress – Russian expendable freighter spacecraft
- Soyuz GVK – Planned retrievable cargo spacecraft
- Argo (Russian spacecraft) – Russian spacecraft

==== Crew ====
- Boeing Starliner – Class of partially reusable crew capsules
- Orel – Planned reusable crewed spacecraft
- Dragon Crew – 2020s class of partially reusable spacecraft
