= SpaceX CRS-19 =

2019 American resupply spaceflight to the ISS

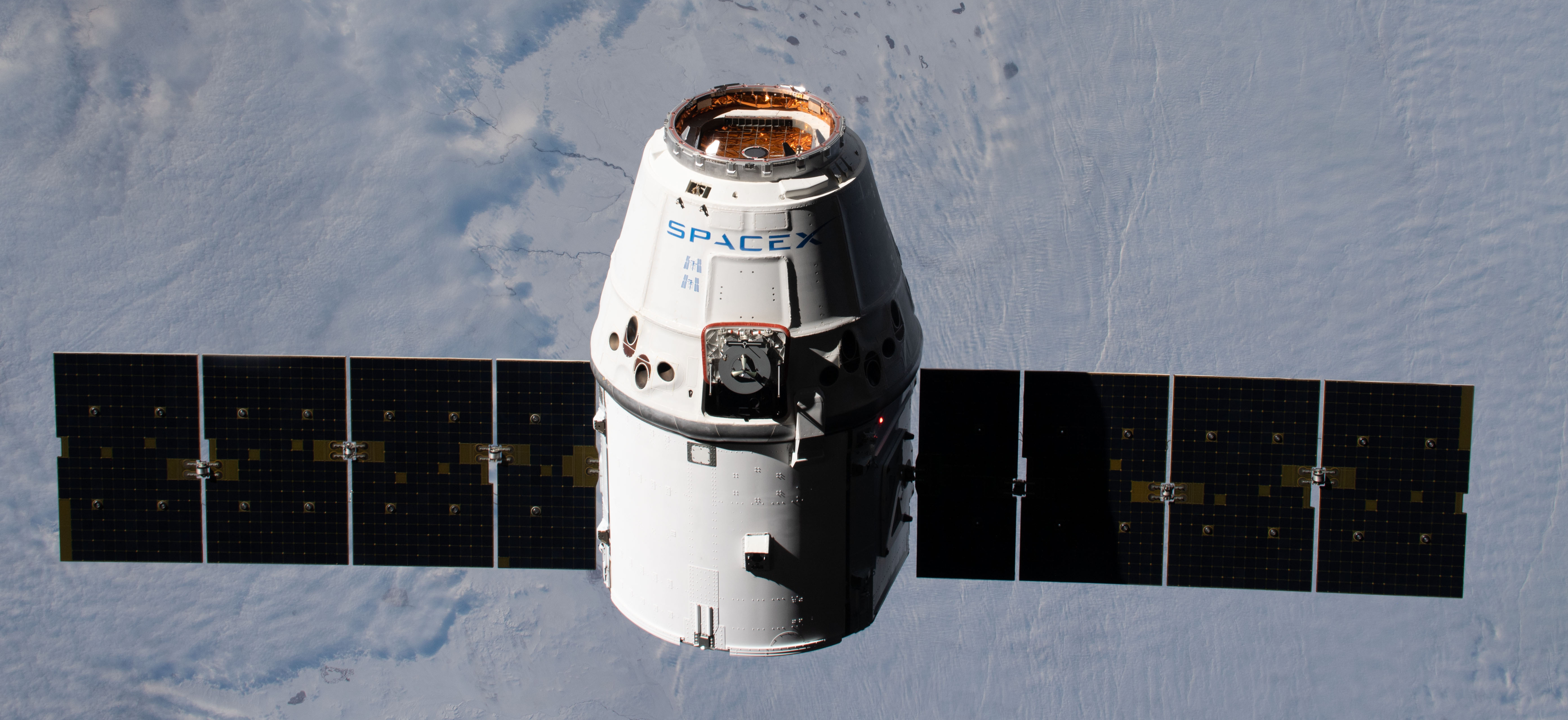
- Dragon C106.3 approaches the ISS
- Names: SpX-19
- Mission type: ISS resupply
- Operator: SpaceX
- COSPAR ID: 2019-083A
- SATCAT no.: 44821
- Mission duration: 32 days, 22 hours, 12 minutes

Spacecraft properties
- Spacecraft: Dragon 1 C106
- Spacecraft type: Dragon 1
- Manufacturer: SpaceX
- Dry mass: 4,200 kg (9,300 lb)
- Dimensions: Height: 6.1 m (20 ft); Diameter: 3.7 m (12 ft)

Start of mission
- Launch date: 5 December 2019, 17:29:24 UTC
- Rocket: Falcon 9 Block 5 B1059-1
- Launch site: Cape Canaveral, SLC-40

End of mission
- Disposal: Recovered
- Landing date: 7 January 2020, 15:42 UTC
- Landing site: Pacific Ocean

Orbital parameters
- Reference system: Geocentric
- Regime: Low Earth
- Inclination: 51.6°

Berthing at ISS
- Berthing port: Harmony nadir
- RMS capture: 8 December 2019, 10:05 UTC
- Berthing date: 8 December 2019, 12:47 UTC
- Unberthing date: 7 January 2020, 08:41 UTC
- RMS release: 7 January 2020, 10:05 UTC
- Time berthed: 29 days, 19 hours, 54 minutes

Cargo
- Mass: 2,617 kg (5,769 lb)
- Pressurised: 1,693 kg (3,732 lb)
- Unpressurised: 924 kg (2,037 lb)
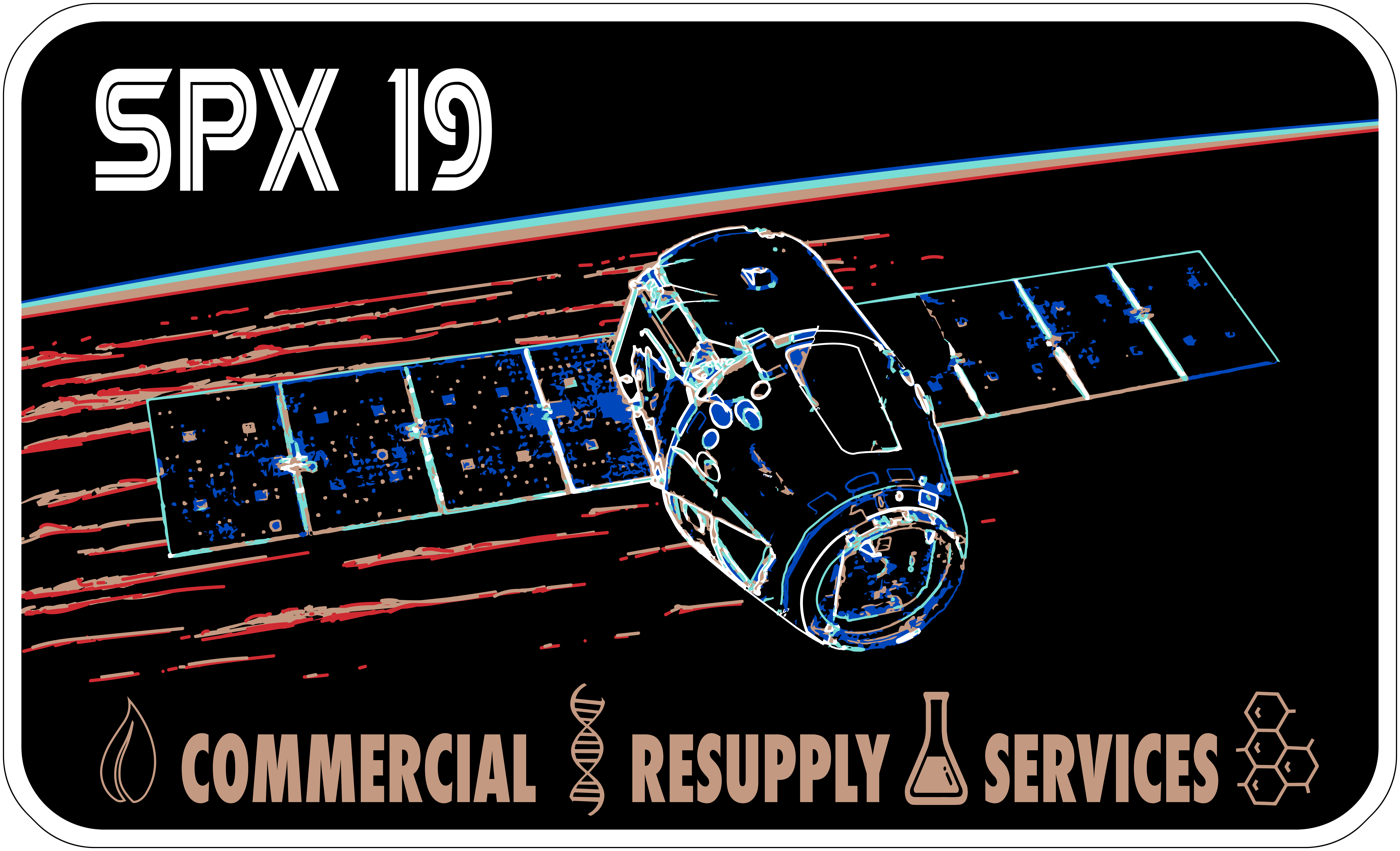
- SpaceX CRS-19 mission patch Commercial Resupply Services Cargo Dragon

SpaceX CRS-19, also known as SpX-19, was a Commercial Resupply Service mission to the International Space Station. The mission is contracted by NASA and was flown by SpaceX on a Falcon 9 rocket.

Dragon capsule C106 made its third flight on CRS-19 having previously flown on CRS-4 and CRS-11. Dragon successfully returned to Earth on 7 January 2020 after a month-long stay at the ISS.

== Launch schedule history ==
In February 2016, it was announced that NASA had awarded a contract extension to SpaceX for five CRS additional missions (CRS-16 to CRS-20). In June 2016, a NASA Inspector General report had this mission manifested for December 2018. The mission was later delayed to 15 October 2019, but launched in December 2019.

On 5 December 2019, CRS-19 launched successfully, followed by a successful first stage landing on the barge Of Course I Still Love You.

== Payload ==
NASA has contracted for the CRS-19 mission from SpaceX and therefore determines the primary payload, date/time of launch, and orbital parameters for the Dragon space capsule. CRS-11 carried a total of 2,617 kg (5,769 lb) of material into orbit. This included 1,693 kg (3,732 lb) of pressurised cargo with packaging bound for the International Space Station, and 924 kg (2,037 lb) of unpressurised cargo composed of the Kibō-mounted Hyperspectral Imager Suite (HISUI) from Japan, the Robotic Tool Stowage (RiTS) platform, and a replacement lithium-ion battery for the station's solar array truss.

The following is a breakdown of cargo bound for the ISS:

- Science investigations: 977 kg (2,154 lb)
- Crew supplies: 256 kg (564 lb)
- Vehicle hardware: 306 kg (675 lb)
- Spacewalk equipment: 64 kg (141 lb)
- Computer resources: 15 kg (33 lb)
- External payloads:
  - Hyperspectral Imaging Suite (HISUI): ~500 kg (1,100 lb)
  - Robotic Tool Stowage (RiTS)
  - Lithium-ion battery

Among the science experiments transported to the station are the Anheuser-Busch-sponsored Germination of ABI Voyager Barley Seeds in Microgravity, the Confined Combustion experiment, and 40 genetically engineered mice as part of the Rodent Research-19 experiment.

A number of CubeSats were launched on CRS-19. The ELaNa-25B flight included AzTechSat-1, SORTIE, and CryoCube, while the ELaNa-28 flight included CIRiS and EdgeCube. Other small satellites launched on this mission include QARMAN and MakerSat-1.

== Gallery ==
SpaceX CRS-19
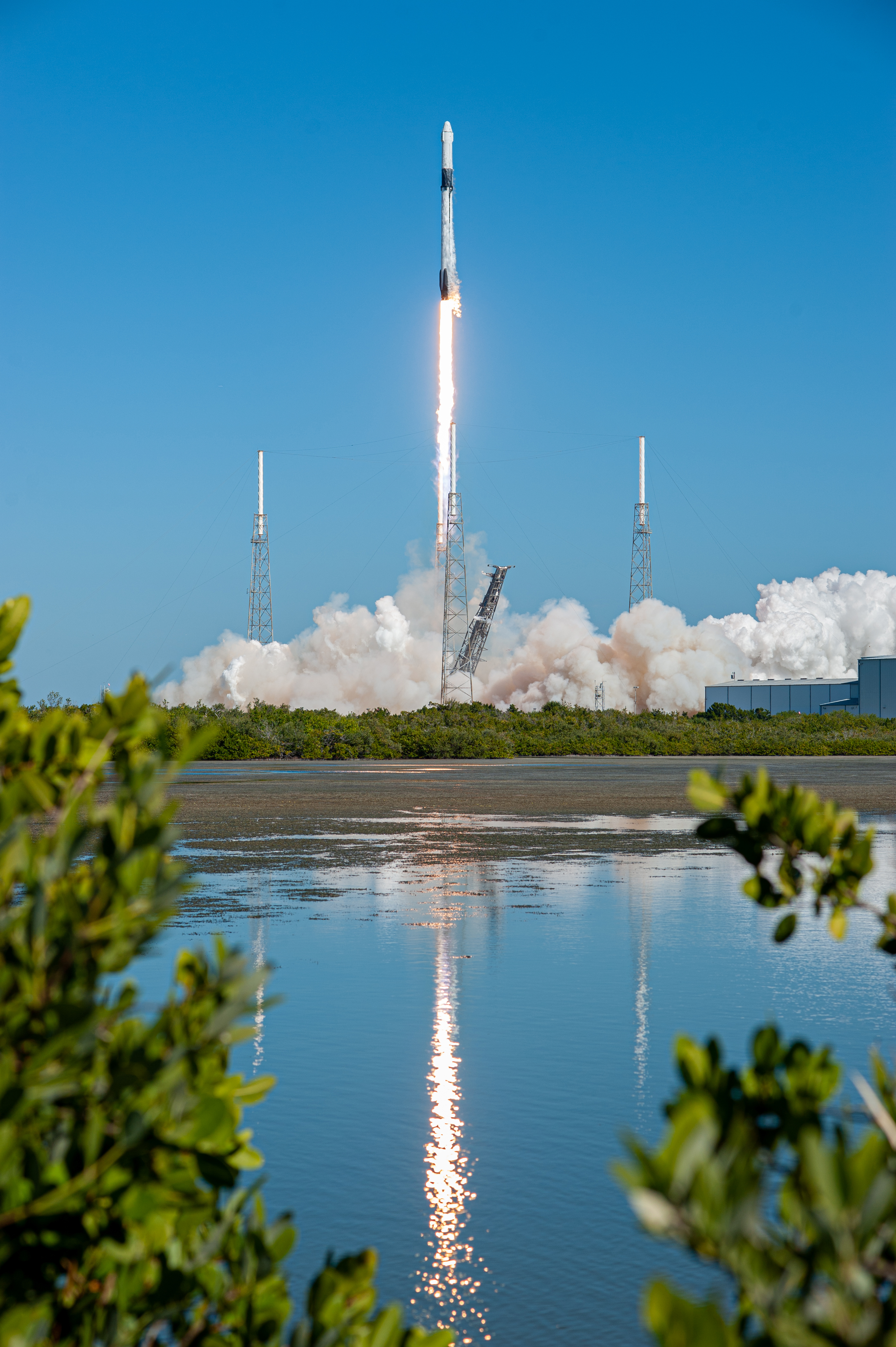
Launch of CRS-19

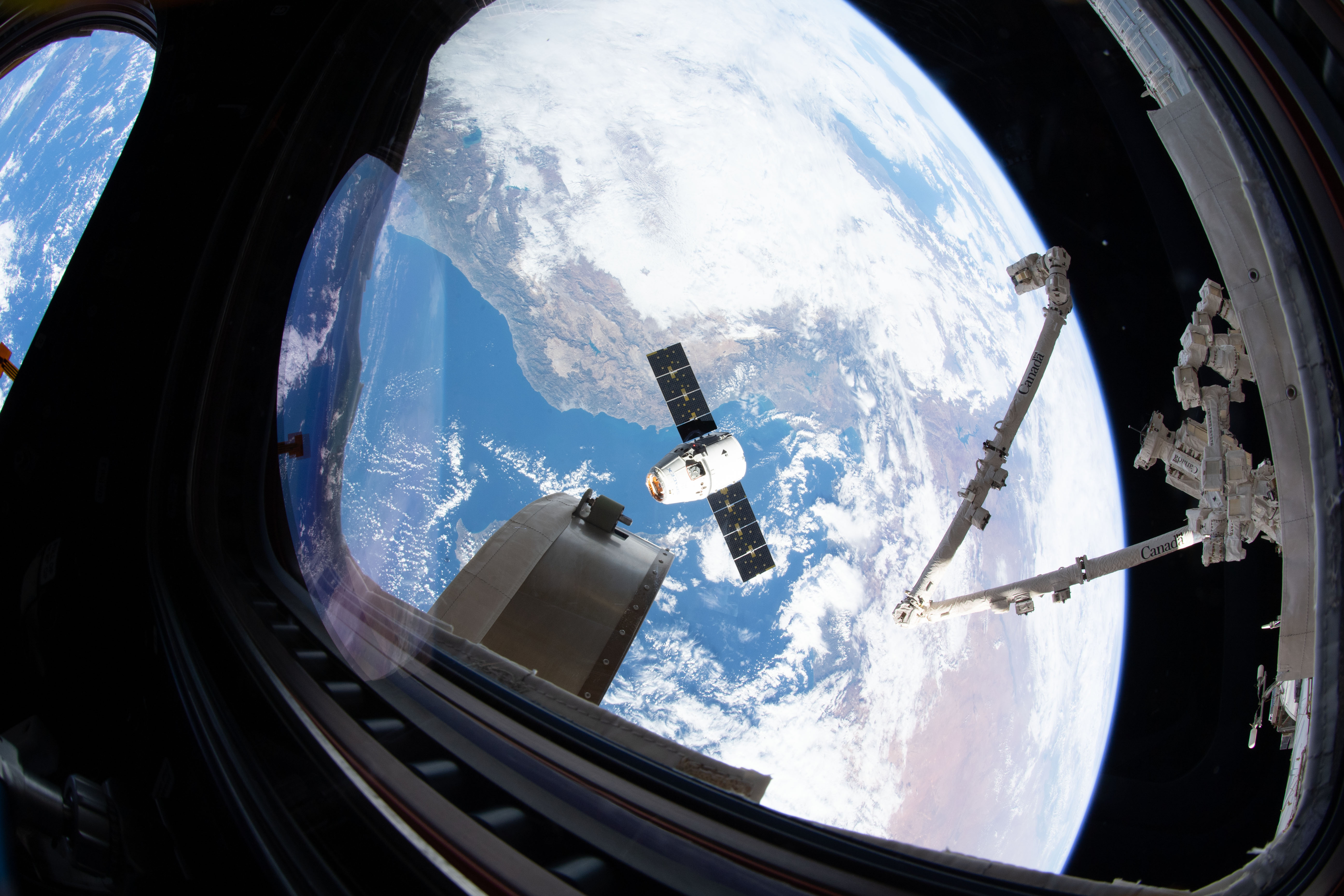
Dragon approaching the ISS

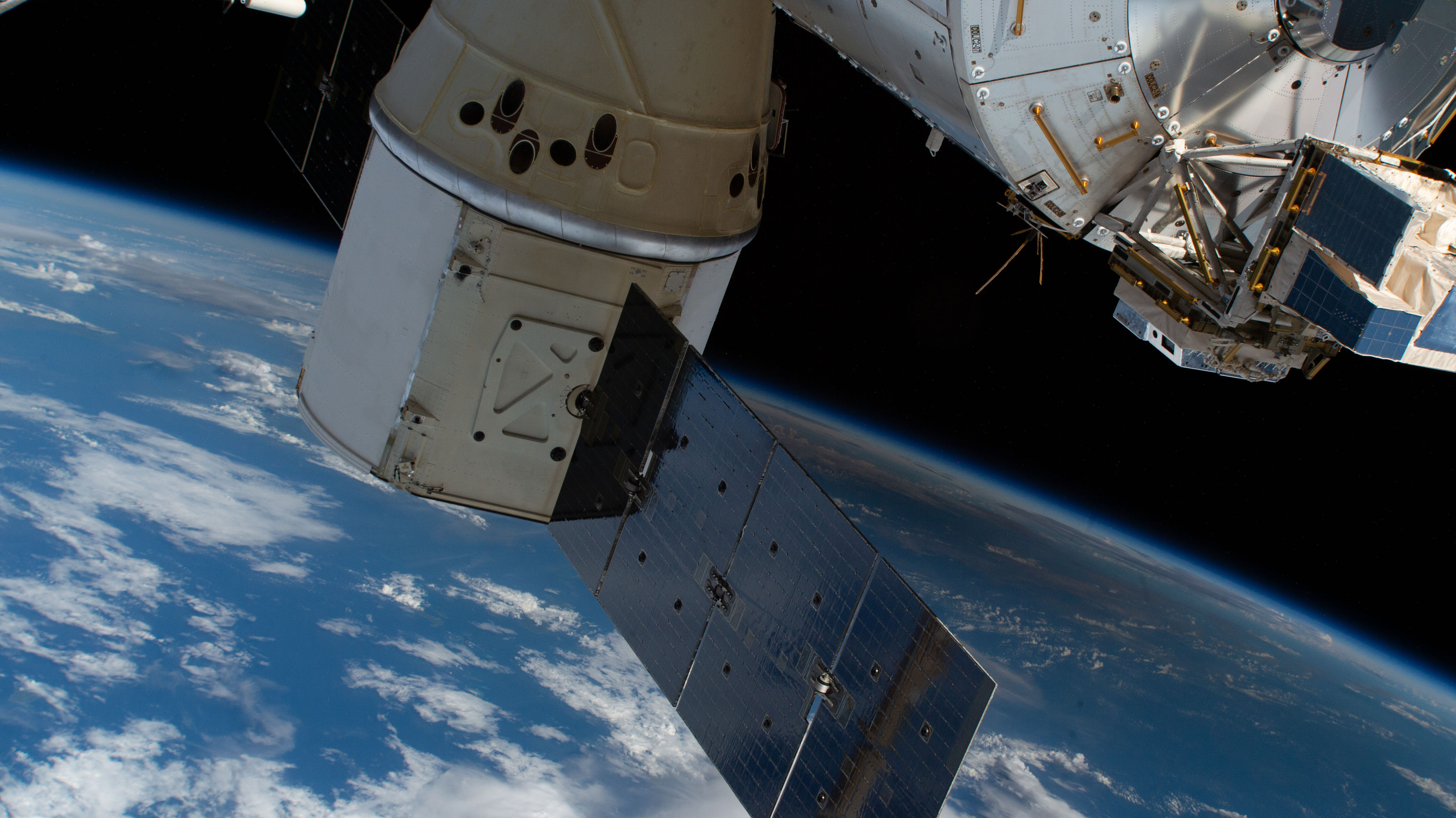
Dragon docked to the ISS; solar eclipse below

== See also ==
- Uncrewed spaceflights to the International Space Station
