= SpaceX CRS-4 =

2014 American resupply spaceflight to the ISS

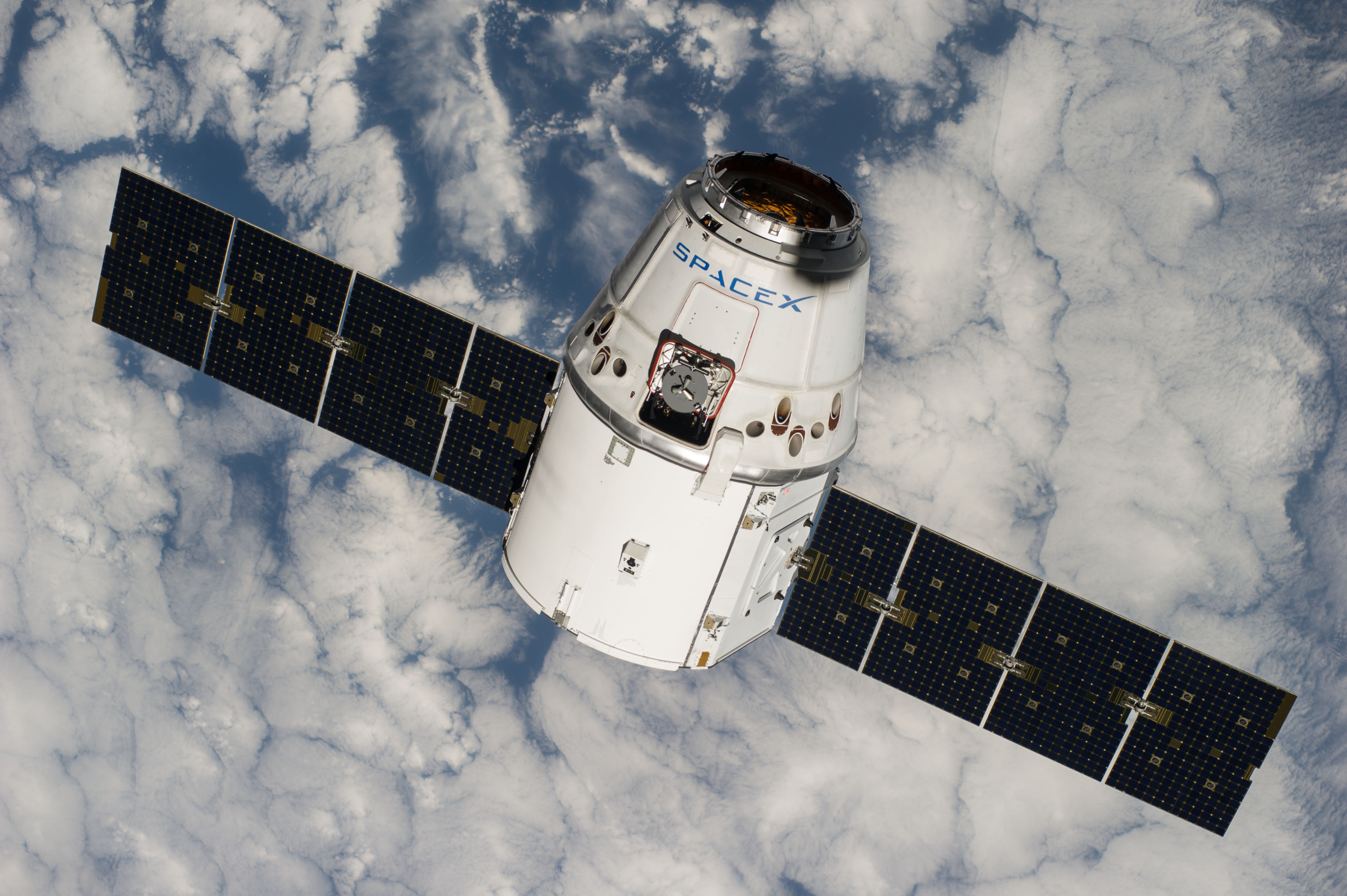
- CRS-4 Dragon approaching ISS on 23 September 2014
- Names: SpX-4
- Mission type: ISS resupply
- Operator: SpaceX
- COSPAR ID: 2014-056A
- SATCAT no.: 40210
- Mission duration: 34 days, 13 hours, 46 minutes

Spacecraft properties
- Spacecraft: Dragon 1 C106
- Spacecraft type: Dragon 1
- Manufacturer: SpaceX
- Launch mass: 6,000 kg (13,000 lb)
- Dry mass: 4,200 kg (9,300 lb)

Start of mission
- Launch date: 21 September 2014, 05:52:03 UTC
- Rocket: Falcon 9 v1.1 (B1010)
- Launch site: Cape Canaveral, SLC-40

End of mission
- Disposal: Recovered
- Landing date: 25 October 2014, 19:39 UTC
- Landing site: Atlantic Ocean

Orbital parameters
- Reference system: Geocentric orbit
- Regime: Low Earth orbit
- Inclination: 51.6°

Berthing at International Space Station
- Berthing port: Harmony nadir
- RMS capture: 23 September 2014, 10:52 UTC
- Berthing date: 23 September 2014, 13:21 UTC
- Unberthing date: 25 October 2014, 12:02 UTC
- RMS release: 25 October 2014, 13:56 UTC
- Time berthed: 31 days, 22 hours, 41 minutes

Cargo
- Mass: 2,216 kg (4,885 lb)
- Pressurised: 1,627 kg (3,587 lb)
- Unpressurised: 589 kg (1,299 lb)
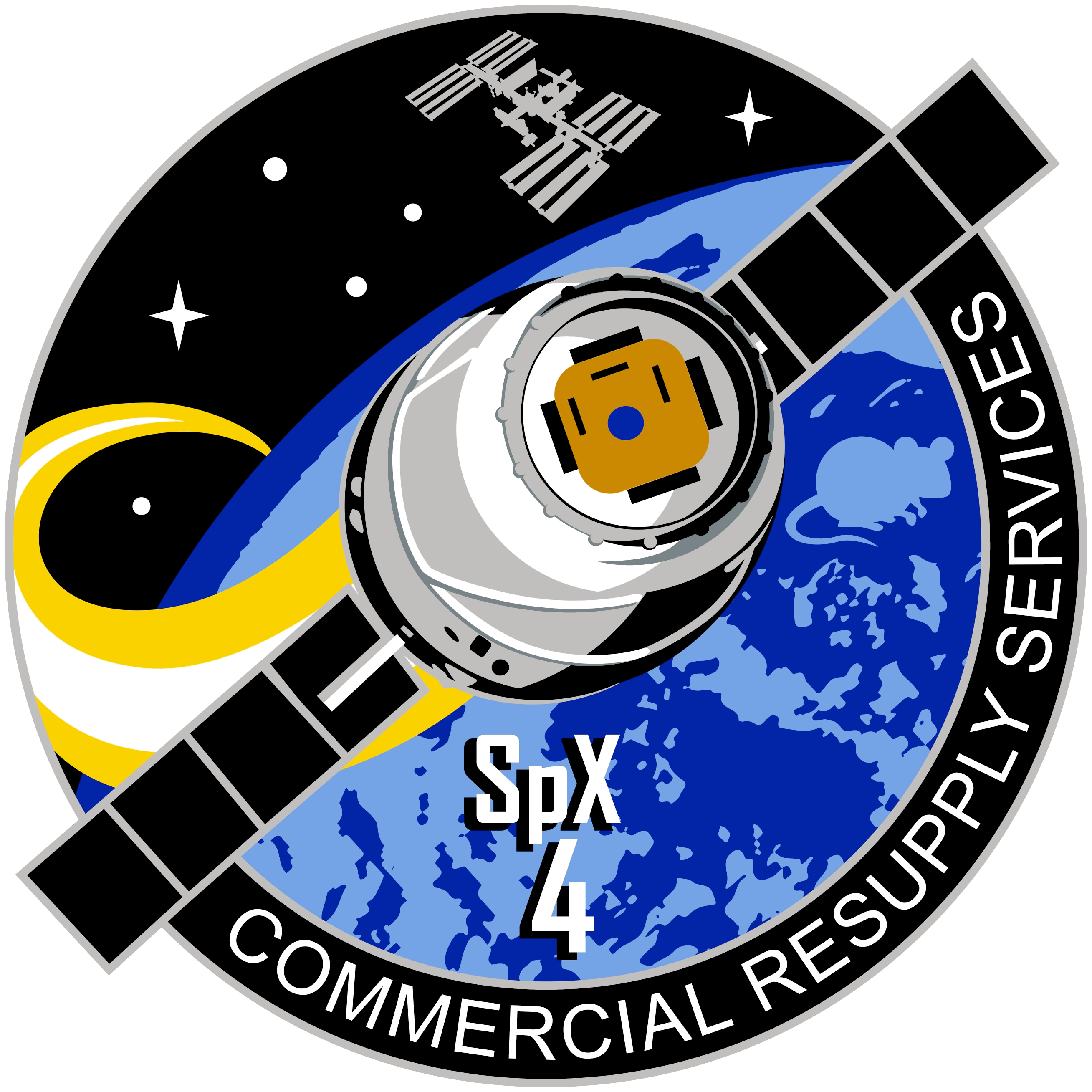
- NASA SpX-4 mission patch Commercial Resupply Services Cargo Dragon

SpaceX CRS-4, also known as SpX-4, was a Commercial Resupply Service mission to the International Space Station (ISS), contracted to NASA, which was launched on 21 September 2014 and arrived at the space station on 23 September 2014. It was the sixth flight for SpaceX's uncrewed Dragon cargo spacecraft, and the fourth SpaceX operational mission contracted to NASA under a Commercial Resupply Services contract. The mission brought equipment and supplies to the space station, including the first 3D printer to be tested in space, a device to measure wind speed on Earth, and small satellites to be launched from the station. It also brought 20 mice for long-term research aboard the ISS.

== Launch history ==
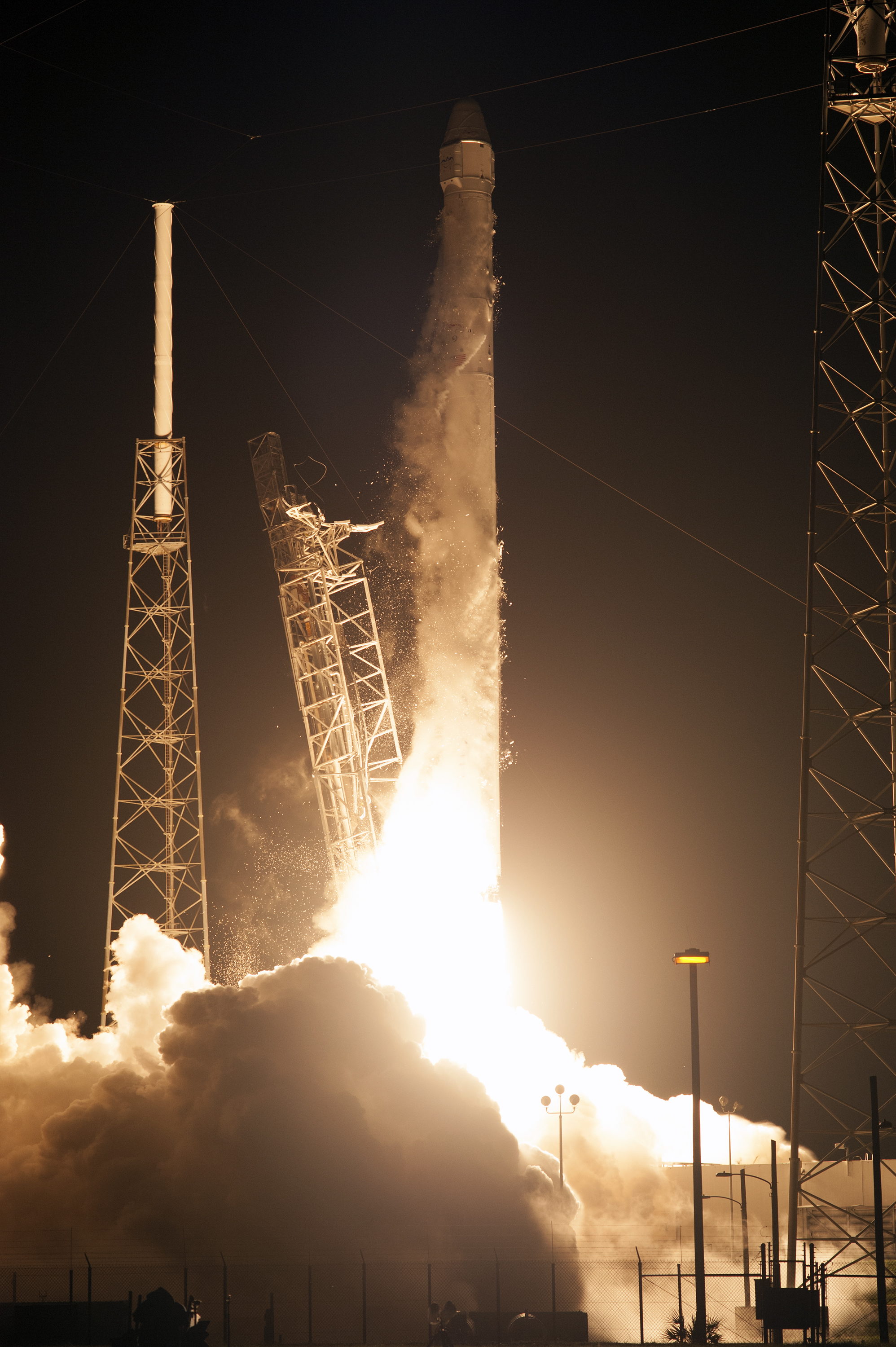
Liftoff of SpaceX CRS-4 aboard a Falcon 9 launch vehicle on 21 September 2014

After a scrub due to poor weather conditions on 20 September 2014, the launch occurred on 21 September 2014 at 05:52 UTC from Cape Canaveral Air Force Station (CCAFS) in Florida.

== Primary payload ==
NASA contracted for the CRS-4 mission and therefore determined the primary payload, date/time of launch, and target orbital parameters. The CRS-4 lifted off on 21 September 2014 with a payload consisted of 4,885 lb (2,216 kg) of cargo, including 1,380 lb (630 kg) of crew supplies. The cargo included the ISS-RapidScat, a Scatterometer designed to support weather forecasting by bouncing microwaves off the ocean's surface to measure wind speed, which was launched as an external payload to be attached on the end of the station's Columbus laboratory. CRS-4 also includes the Space Station Integrated Kinetic Launcher for Orbital Payload Systems (SSIKLOPS), which will provide still another means to release other small satellites from the ISS.

In addition, CRS-4 carried a new permanent life science research facility to the station: the Bone Densitometer (BD) payload, developed by Techshot, which provides a bone density scanning capability on ISS for utilization by NASA and the Center for the Advancement of Science in Space (CASIS). The system measures bone mineral density (and lean and fat tissue) in mice using Dual-Energy X-ray Absorptiometry (DEXA). The Rodent Research Hardware System was also carried to the ISS as part of the payload.

== Secondary payloads ==
SpaceX has primary control over manifesting, scheduling and loading secondary payloads. However, there are certain restrictions included in their contract with NASA that preclude specified hazards on the secondary payloads, and also require contract-specified probabilities of success and safety margins for any SpaceX reboosts of the secondary satellites once the Falcon 9 second stage has achieved its initial low Earth orbit (LEO).

The CRS-4 mission carried the 3D Printing in Zero-G Experiment to the ISS, as well as a small satellite as secondary payload that will be deployed from the ISS: SPINSAT. It also brought 20 mice for long-term physiological research in space.

=== 3D Printing in Zero-G Experiment ===
The 3D Printing in Zero-G Experiment will demonstrate the use of 3D printing technology in space. 3D printing works by the process of extruding streams of heated material (plastic, metal, etc.) and building a three-dimensional structure layer-upon-layer. The 3D Printing in Zero-G Experiment will test the 3D printer specifically designed for microgravity, by Made In Space, Inc., of Mountain View, California. Made In Space's customized 3D printer will be the first device to manufacture parts away from planet Earth. The 3D Printing in Zero-G Experiment will validate the capability of additive manufacturing in zero-gravity. This experiment on the International Space Station is the first step towards establishing an on-demand machine shop in space, a critical enabling component for deep-space crewed missions and in-space manufacturing.

=== SPINSAT ===
SPINSAT is a 56 cm (22 in)-diameter sphere built by the U.S. government Naval Research Laboratory (NRL) to study atmospheric density.

SPINSAT is a technology demonstrator for electric solid propellant (ESP) thrusters from Digital Solid State Propulsion (DSSP). DSSP's technology utilizes electric propulsion to enable small satellites to make orbital maneuvers that have generally not been possible in the very small, mass-constrained satellites such as CubeSats and nanosats. This will be DSSP's first flight and will be deployed from the Kibō module airlock. NASA safety experts approved the mission — which by its nature must start with the satellite inside the habitable volume of the ISS — because the satellite's 12 thruster-clusters burn an inert solid fuel, and then only when an electric charge is passed across it.

=== Rodent Research Hardware System ===
The mission also brought 20 mice to live on the ISS for study of the long-term effects of microgravity on the rodents using the Rodent Research Hardware System.

== First stage landing attempt ==
The Falcon 9 first stage for the CRS-4 mission re-entered the atmosphere over the Atlantic Ocean off the East Coast of the United States. Its re-entry was captured on video by a NASA WB-57 aircraft as part of research into high-speed Mars atmospheric entry.

In November 2015, a panel from this first stage was found floating off the Isles of Scilly in the southwest United Kingdom. Although much of the media suggested the part came from the later CRS-7 launch which exploded, SpaceX confirmed it came from CRS-4.

== Dragon reuse ==
The structural core of the CRS-4 Dragon capsule, Dragon C106, was refurbished and reused in the SpaceX CRS-11 mission, the first Dragon capsule to be reused.

== Gallery ==
SpaceX CRS-4
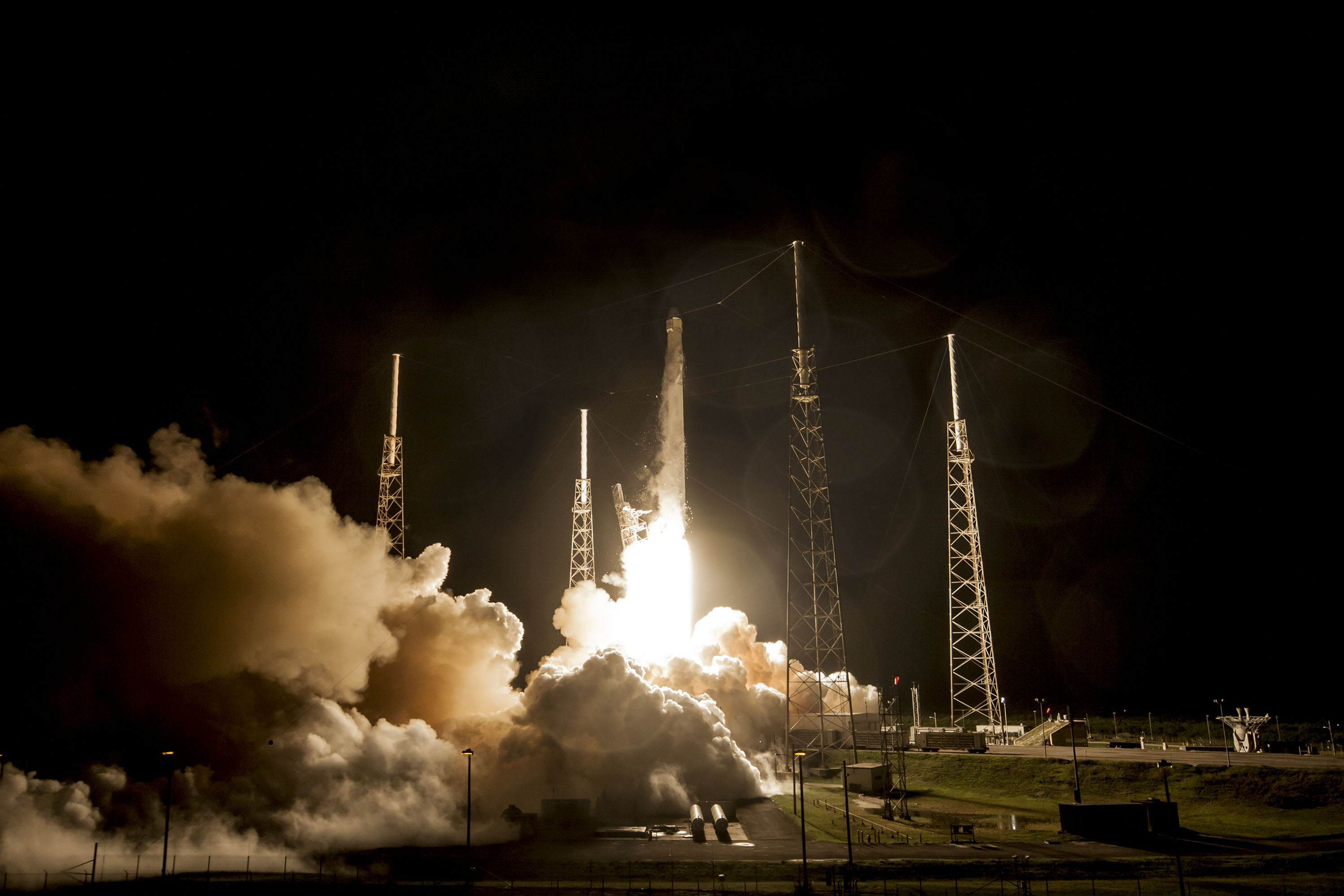
Launch of CRS-4

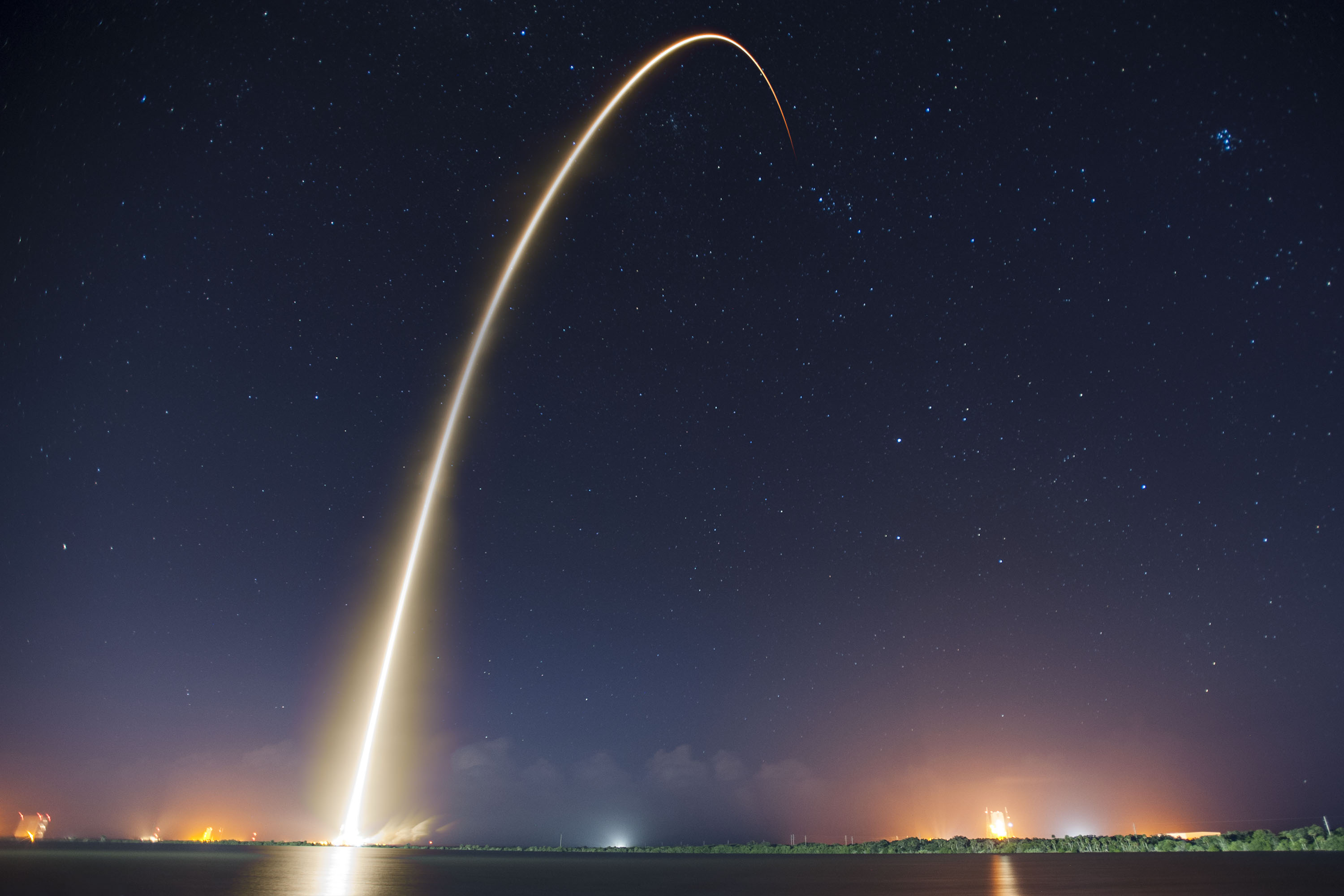
Long-exposure image of launch

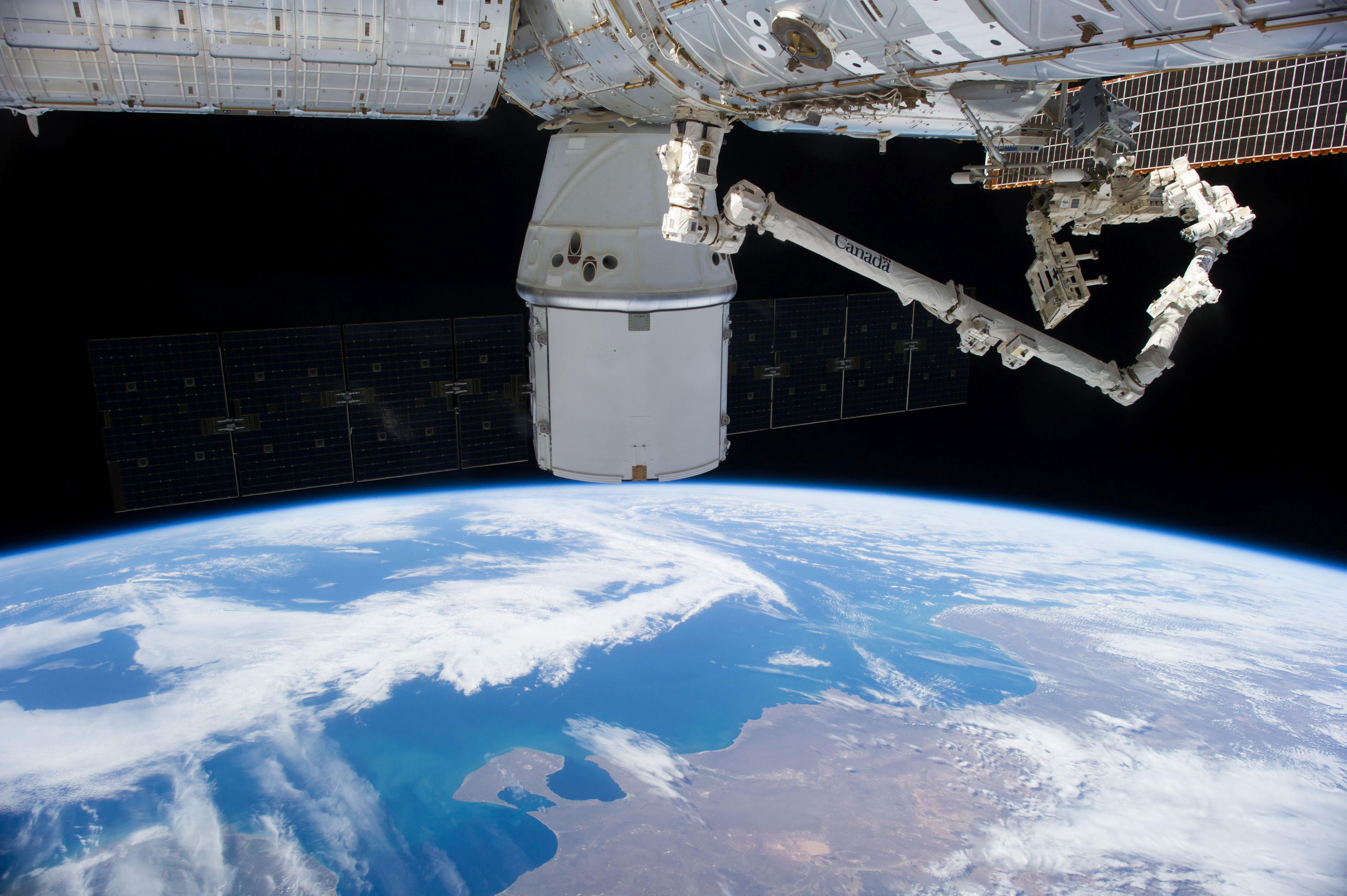
CRS-4 docked to the ISS

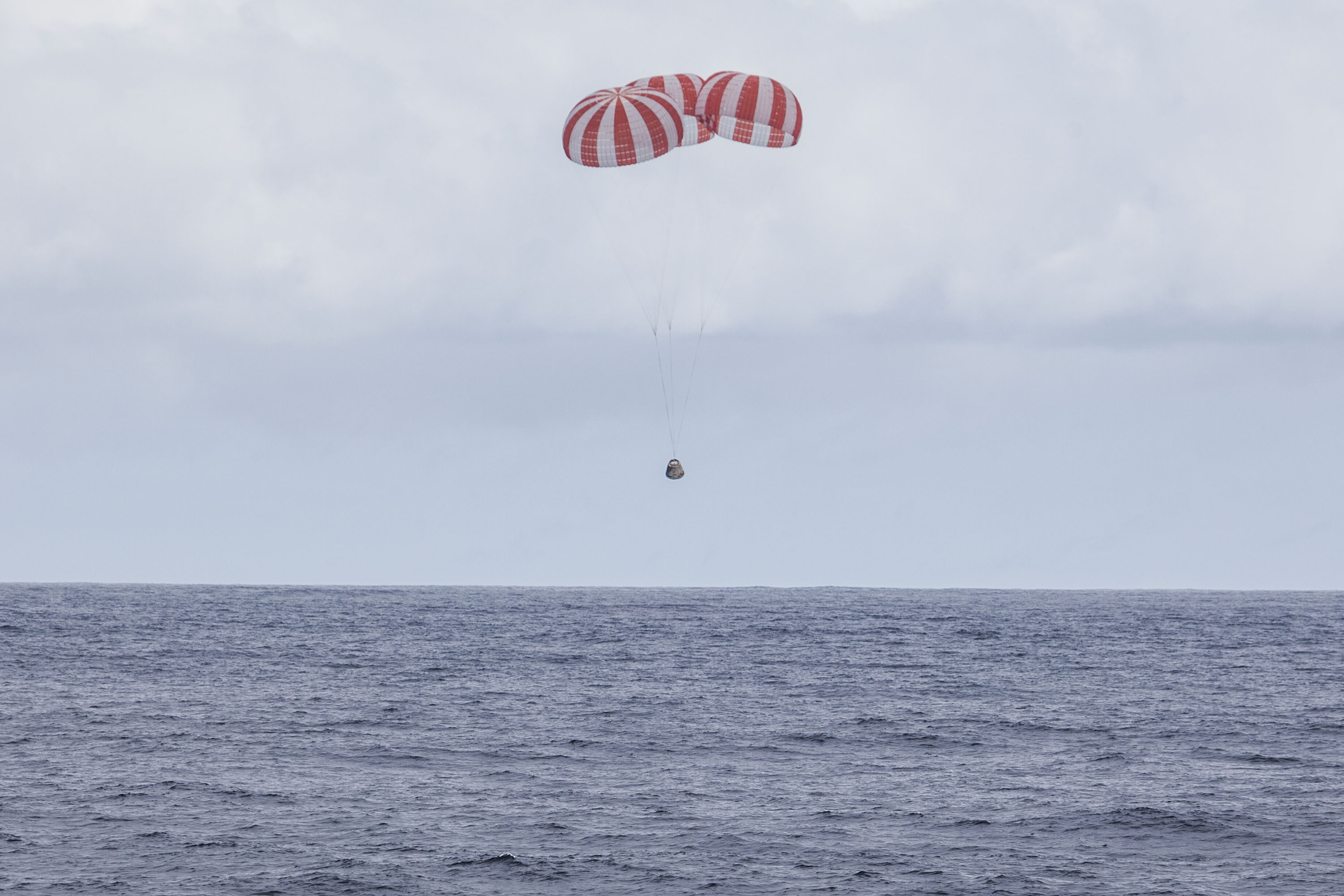
Dragon descending under parachutes

== See also ==
- Uncrewed spaceflights to the International Space Station
- List of Falcon 9 and Falcon Heavy launches
