= Dragon C106 =

Spacecraft manufactured by SpaceX

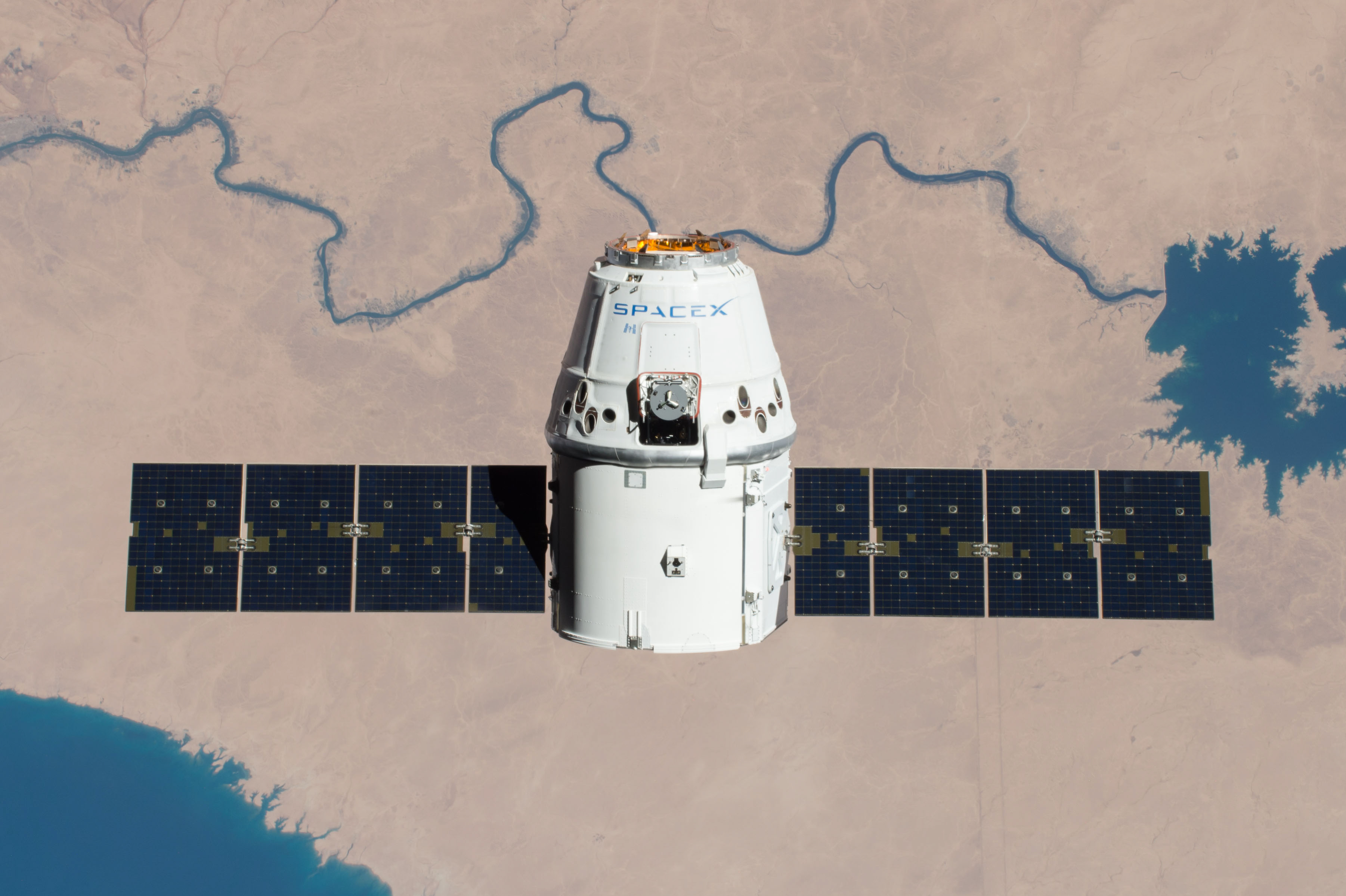
- C106 in flight in June 2017, during CRS-11.
- Type: Cargo space capsule
- Class: SpaceX Dragon
- Owner: SpaceX
- Manufacturer: SpaceX

Specifications
- Dimensions: 6.1 m × 3.7 m (20 ft × 12 ft)
- Dry mass: 4,201 kilograms (9,262 lb)
- Power: Solar arrays
- Rocket: Falcon 9

History
- First flight: 21 September – 25 October 2014; SpaceX CRS-4
- Last flight: 5 December 2019 – 7 January 2020; SpaceX CRS-19
- Flights: 3
- Fate: Retired

SpaceX Dragons

SpaceX Dragon C106 is a Dragon space capsule built by SpaceX. It is the first reused SpaceX Dragon capsule to be reflown into space, having its second launch in 2017. C106 was first used on CRS-4, and then used again for the CRS-11 and CRS-19 missions. It was the second capsule after C108 to be used a third time, marking a milestone in SpaceX's drive to reduce space launch costs through reusing hardware.

== History ==
C106 was built as the sixth production Dragon capsule. This new Dragon was launched in September 2014 for the CRS-4 mission to the International Space Station (ISS). It splashed down in October 2014, and was successfully retrieved. To prepare for its second flight, it had its heatshield replaced while the hull, avionics, and Draco thrusters were refurbished. The refurbished Dragon was relaunched in June 2017 for the CRS-11 mission to the ISS. It splashed down and was successfully recovered in July 2017. After undergoing another refurbishment, C106 was launched again for the CRS-19 mission.

== Flights ==
C106 flights
Flight #	Mission	Launch date (UTC)	Landing date (UTC)	Liftoff	Landing	Notes
1	NASA CRS-4	21 September 2014	25 October 2014			
2	NASA CRS-11	3 June 2017	3 July 2017			This was the 100th launch from Launch Pad 39A
3	NASA CRS-19	5 December 2019	7 January 2020			

== See also ==
- Falcon 9 booster B1029, the second SpaceX Falcon 9 booster to be reused
- Falcon 9 booster B1021, the first SpaceX Falcon 9 booster to be reused
- Falcon 9 booster B1019, the first SpaceX Falcon 9 booster to be successfully landed
- Gemini spacecraft No. 2, the first space capsule to be reflown
- Scaled Composites SpaceShipOne
- McDonnell Douglas DC-X
- Blue Origin New Shepard
- Space Shuttle
