= ISS ECLSS =

International Space Station life-support system

The interactions between the components of the ISS Environmental Control and Life Support System (ECLSS)

The Environmental Control and Life Support System (ECLSS, /ˈiːklɪs/ EE-kliss) is a critical component of the International Space Station (ISS), responsible for maintaining a safe and habitable environment for crew members, similar to that of Earth, with an air pressure equivalent to sea level. Maintaining an Earth-like atmosphere enhances crew comfort and safety, and is significantly safer than a pure oxygen environment.

The various subsystems of the ISS ECLSS regulate atmospheric pressure, control temperature and humidity, remove carbon dioxide, manage oxygen and nitrogen levels, provide ventilation, treat sewage, and generate potable water even in space.

The system was jointly designed and tested by NASA's Marshall Space Flight Center, UTC Aerospace Systems, Boeing, Lockheed Martin, and Honeywell. In addition to its primary functions, the ECLSS serves as a proof of concept for future, more advanced life support systems intended for deep space missions.

== Water recovery systems ==
The ISS has two water recovery systems. Zvezda contains a water recovery system that processes water vapor from the atmosphere that could be used for drinking in an emergency but is normally fed to the Elektron system to produce oxygen. The American segment has a Water Recovery System installed during STS-126 that can process water vapour collected from the atmosphere and urine into water that is intended for drinking. The Water Recovery System was installed initially in Destiny on a temporary basis in November 2008 and moved into Tranquility (Node 3) in February 2010.

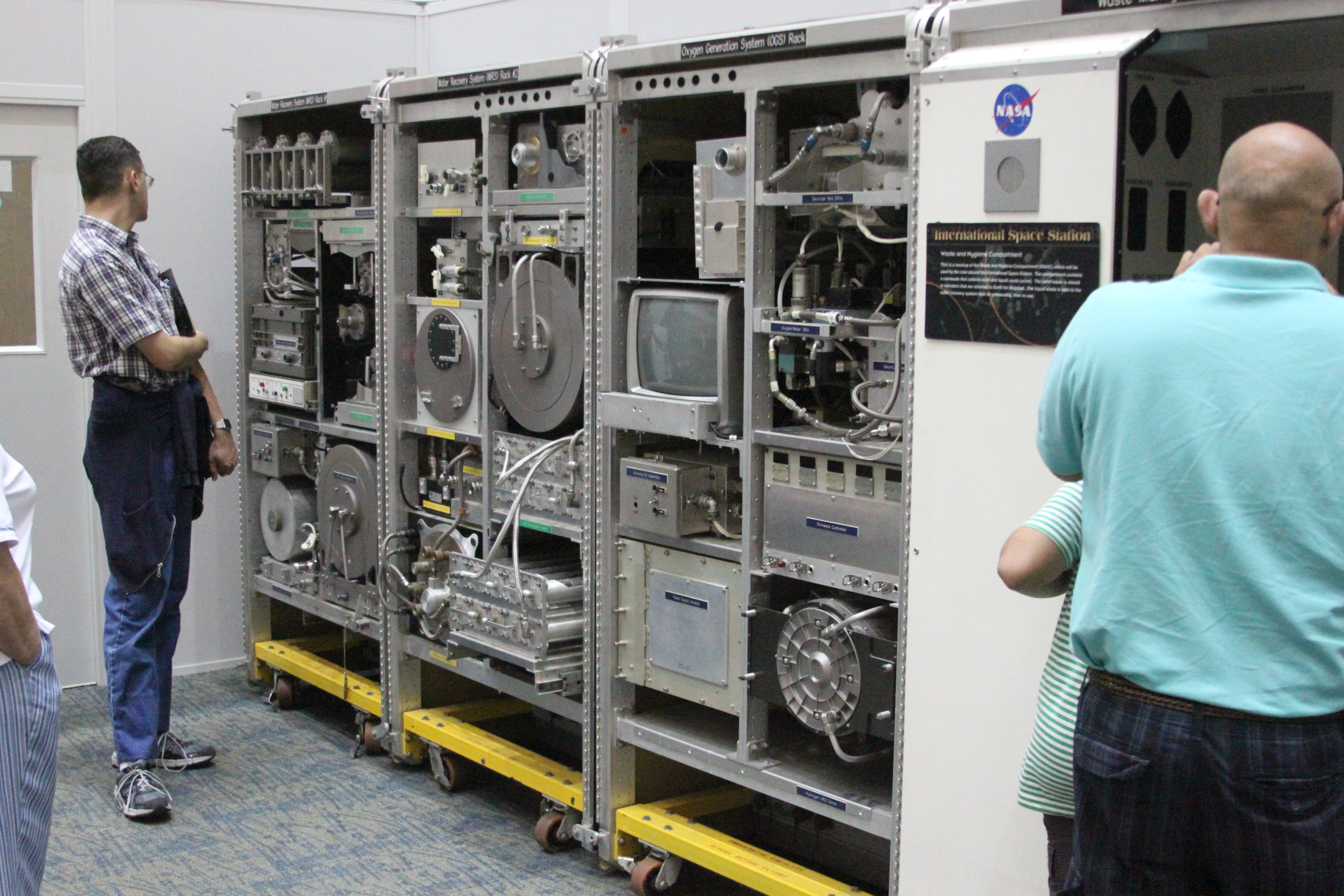
The three ECLSS racks on display at the Marshall Space Flight Center ECLSS Test Facility in 2012. From left to right, the Water Recovery System (Rack 1), WRS (Rack 2) and Oxygen Generating System.

The Water Recovery System consists of a Urine Processor Assembly and a Water Processor Assembly, housed in two of the three ECLSS racks.

The Urine Processor Assembly uses a low pressure vacuum distillation process that uses a centrifuge to compensate for the lack of gravity and thus aid in separating liquids and gasses. The Urine Processor Assembly is designed to handle a load of 9 kg/day, corresponding to the needs of a 6-person crew. Although the design called for the recovery of 85% of the water content, subsequent experience with calcium sulfate precipitation (in the free-fall conditions present on the ISS, calcium levels in urine are elevated due to bone density loss) has led to a revised operational level of recovering 70% of the water content.

Water from the Urine Processor Assembly and from waste water sources are combined to feed the Water Processor Assembly that filters out gasses and solid materials before passing through filter beds and then a high-temperature catalytic reactor assembly. The water is then tested by onboard sensors and unacceptable water is cycled back through the water processor assembly.

A Brine Processor Assembly (BPA) was later added to recover the water left in the brine that the Urine Processor Assembly's distillation produces. The BPA passes the brine through a membrane and blows warm, dry air over it, and the evaporated water is collected from the cabin air along with moisture from crew breath and sweat, then treated by the Water Processor Assembly. In June 2023 NASA reported that the BPA had raised the station's total water recovery from 93 to 94% to 98%, the level NASA gives as the goal for long missions beyond low Earth orbit.

The Volatile Removal Assembly flew on STS-89 in January 1998 to demonstrate the Water Processor Assembly's catalytic reactor in microgravity. A Vapour Compression Distillation Flight Experiment flew, but was destroyed, in STS-107.

The distillation assembly of the Urine Processor Assembly failed on 21 November 2008, one day after the initial installation. One of the three centrifuge speed sensors was reporting anomalous speeds, and high centrifuge motor current was observed. This was corrected by re-mounting the distillation assembly without several rubber vibration isolators. The distillation assembly failed again on 28 December 2008 due to a high motor current and was replaced on 20 March 2009. Ultimately, during post-failure testing, one centrifuge speed sensor was found to be out of alignment and a compressor bearing had failed.

== Atmosphere ==
Several systems are currently used on board the ISS to maintain the spacecraft's atmosphere, which is similar to the Earth's. Normal air pressure on the ISS is 101.3 kPa (14.7 psi); the same as at sea level on Earth. "While members of the ISS crew could stay healthy even with the pressure at a lower level, the equipment on the Station is very sensitive to pressure. If the pressure were to drop too far, it could cause problems with the Station equipment."

The Elektron system aboard Zvezda and a similar system in Destiny generate oxygen aboard the station. The crew has a backup option in the form of bottled oxygen and Solid Fuel Oxygen Generation (SFOG) canisters. Carbon dioxide is removed from the air by the Vozdukh system in Zvezda. One Carbon Dioxide Removal Assembly (CDRA) is located in the U.S. Lab module, and one is in the US Node 3 module. Other by-products of human metabolism, such as methane from flatulence and ammonia from sweat, are removed by activated charcoal filters or by the Trace Contaminant Control System (TCCS).

=== Air Revitalization System ===
Carbon dioxide and trace contaminants are removed by the Air Revitalization System. This is a NASA rack, placed in Tranquility, designed to provide a Carbon Dioxide Removal Assembly (CDRA), a Trace Contaminant Control Subassembly (TCCS) to remove hazardous trace contamination from the atmosphere and a Major Constituent Analyser (MCA) to monitor nitrogen, oxygen, carbon dioxide, methane, hydrogen, and water vapour. The Air Revitalization System was flown to the station aboard STS-128 and was temporarily installed in the Japanese Experiment Module pressurised module. The system was scheduled to be transferred to Tranquility after it arrived and was installed during Space Shuttle Endeavour mission STS-130.

=== Oxygen Generating System ===
The Oxygen Generating System (OGS) is a NASA rack which electrolyses water from the Water Recovery System to produce oxygen and hydrogen, like the Russian Elektron oxygen generator. The oxygen is delivered to the cabin atmosphere. The unit is installed in the Destiny module. During a spacewalk, STS-117 astronauts installed a hydrogen vent valve required to operate the OGS. The OGS was delivered in 2006 by STS-121, and became operational on 12 July 2007. From 2001, the US orbital segment had used oxygen stored in a pressurized tank on the Quest airlock module, or from the Russian service module. Prior to the activation of the Sabatier System in October 2010, hydrogen and carbon dioxide extracted from the cabin was vented overboard.

In October 2010, the OGS stopped running well due to the water input becoming slightly too acidic. The station crew relied on the Elektron oxygen generator and oxygen brought up from Earth for six months. In March 2011, STS-133 delivered the repair kit, and the OGS was brought into full operation.

=== Advanced Closed Loop System ===
The Advanced Closed Loop System (ACLS) is an ESA rack that converts carbon dioxide (CO_{2}) and water into oxygen and methane. The CO_{2} is removed from the station air by an amine scrubber, then removed from the scrubber by steam. 50% of the CO_{2} is converted to methane and water by a Sabatier reaction. The other 50% of carbon dioxide is jettisoned from the ISS along with the methane that is generated. The water is recycled by electrolysis, producing hydrogen (used in the Sabatier reactor) and oxygen. This is different from the NASA oxygen-generating rack that is reliant on a steady supply of water from Earth in order to generate oxygen. This water-saving capability reduced the needed water in cargo resupply by 400 liters per year. By itself it can regenerate enough oxygen for three astronauts.

The ACLS was delivered on the Kounotori 7 launch in September 2018 and installed in the Destiny module as a technology demonstrator (planned to operate for one to two years). It was successful, and remains on board the ISS permanently.

ACLS has three subsystems:

- The Carbon dioxide Concentration Assembly (CCA) uses an amine reaction to absorb and concentrate carbon dioxide from cabin air to keep carbon dioxide within acceptable levels.
- The Carbon dioxide Reprocessing Assembly (CRA) closed the oxygen loop by utilizing a Sabatier Reactor Assembly (SRA) assembly to react CO_{2} from the CCA with waste hydrogen from the Oxygen Generating System to produce water and methane. The water was recycled to reduce the total amount of water carried to the station from Earth, and the methane was vented overboard by the hydrogen vent line installed for the Oxygen Generating System. The system was supplied by NASA and installed in 2010. Over the years, reactor performance gradually declined. In 2013, the reactor suffered multiple failures after moisture was detected inside the carbon dioxide collector and the unit was shut down. It was restarted with some difficulties in January 2017. In late 2017, the sabatier reactor was removed from the CRA and returned to ground for analysis aboard SpaceX CRS-13. The reactor was indended to be replaced in 2020.
- The Oxygen Generation Assembly (OGA) electrolyses water into oxygen and hydrogen.

=== Elektron ===
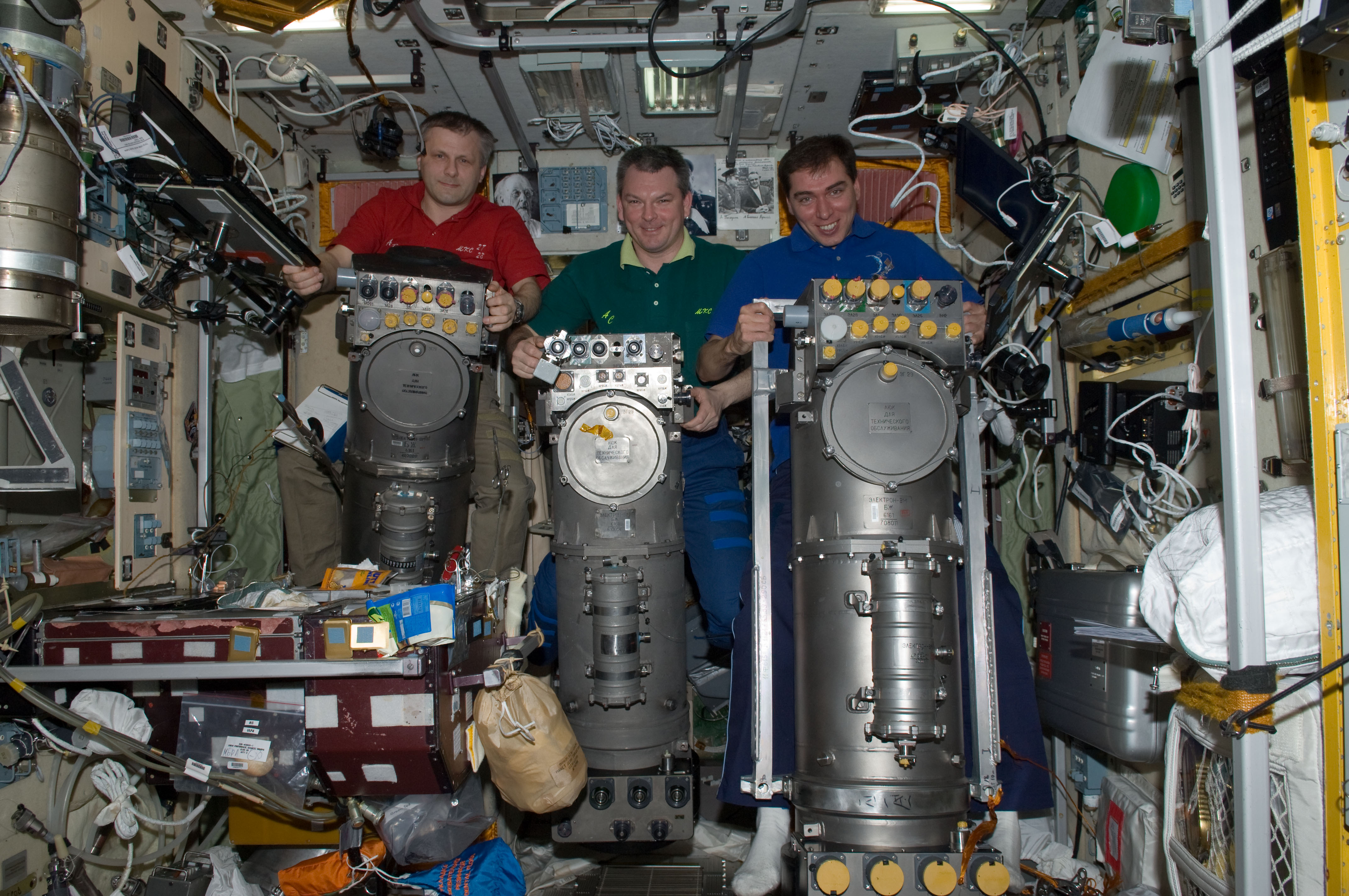
Elektron units in the Zvezda service module.

Elektron is a Russian Electrolytic Oxygen Generator, which was also used on Mir. It uses electrolysis to convert water molecules reclaimed from other uses on board the station into oxygen and hydrogen. The oxygen is vented into the cabin and the hydrogen is vented into space. The three Elektron units on the ISS have been plagued with problems, frequently forcing the crew to use backup sources (either bottled oxygen or the Vika system discussed below). To support a crew of six, NASA added the oxygen generating system discussed above.

In 2004, the Elektron unit shut down due to initially unknown causes. Two weeks of troubleshooting resulted in the unit starting up again, then immediately shutting down. The cause was eventually traced to gas bubbles in the unit, which remained non-functional until a Progress resupply mission in October 2004. In 2005, ISS personnel tapped into the oxygen supply of the recently arrived Progress resupply spacecraft when the Elektron unit failed. In 2006, fumes from a malfunctioning Elektron unit prompted NASA flight engineers to declare a "spacecraft emergency". A burning smell led the ISS crew to suspect another Elektron fire, but the unit was only "very hot". A leak of corrosive, odorless potassium hydroxide forced the ISS crew to don gloves and face masks. It has been conjectured that the smell came from overheated rubber seals. The incident occurred shortly after STS-115 left and just before arrival of a resupply mission (including space tourist Anousheh Ansari). The Elektron did not come back online until November 2006, after new valves and cables arrived on the October 2006 Progress resupply vessel. The ERPTC (Electrical Recovery Processing Terminal Current) was inserted into the ISS to prevent harm to the systems. In October 2020, the Elektron system failed and had to be deactivated for a short time before being repaired.

=== Vika ===
The Vika or TGK oxygen generator, also known as Solid Fuel Oxygen Generation (SFOG) when used on the ISS, is a chemical oxygen generator originally developed by Roscosmos for Mir, and it provides an alternate oxygen generating system. It uses canisters of solid lithium perchlorate, which decomposes into gaseous oxygen and solid lithium chloride when heated. Each canister can supply the oxygen needs of one crewmember for one day.

=== Vozdukh ===
Another Russian system, Vozdukh (Russian Воздух, meaning "air"), removes carbon dioxide from the air with regenerable absorbers of carbon dioxide gas. An incident occurred in 2018 when one of the two Vozdukhs (also known as SKVs) deactivated without a command but was reactivated a little while later.

== Temperature and humidity control ==
Temperature and Humidity Control (THC) is the subsystem of the ISS ECLSS which maintains a steady air temperature and controls moisture in the station's air supply. Thermal Control System (TCS) is a component part of the THC system and subdivides into the Active Thermal Control System (ATCS) and Passive Thermal Control System (PTCS). Controlling humidity is possible through lowering or raising the temperature and through adding moisture to the air.

== Fire detection and suppression ==
Fire Detection and Suppression (FDS) is the subsystem devoted to identifying that there has been a fire and taking steps to fight it.

== See also ==
- International Space Station maintenance
