= C108 =

C108 or C-108 may refer to:

- Xingu corydoras, a species of South American "Corydoras" armoured catfish
- Boeing C-108 Flying Fortress, the designation of four B-17 Flying Fortress heavy bomber
- Dragon C108, capsule construction number of SpaceX's Cargo Dragon. First capsule to be used three times
