= SpaceX CRS-18 =

2019 American resupply spaceflight to the ISS

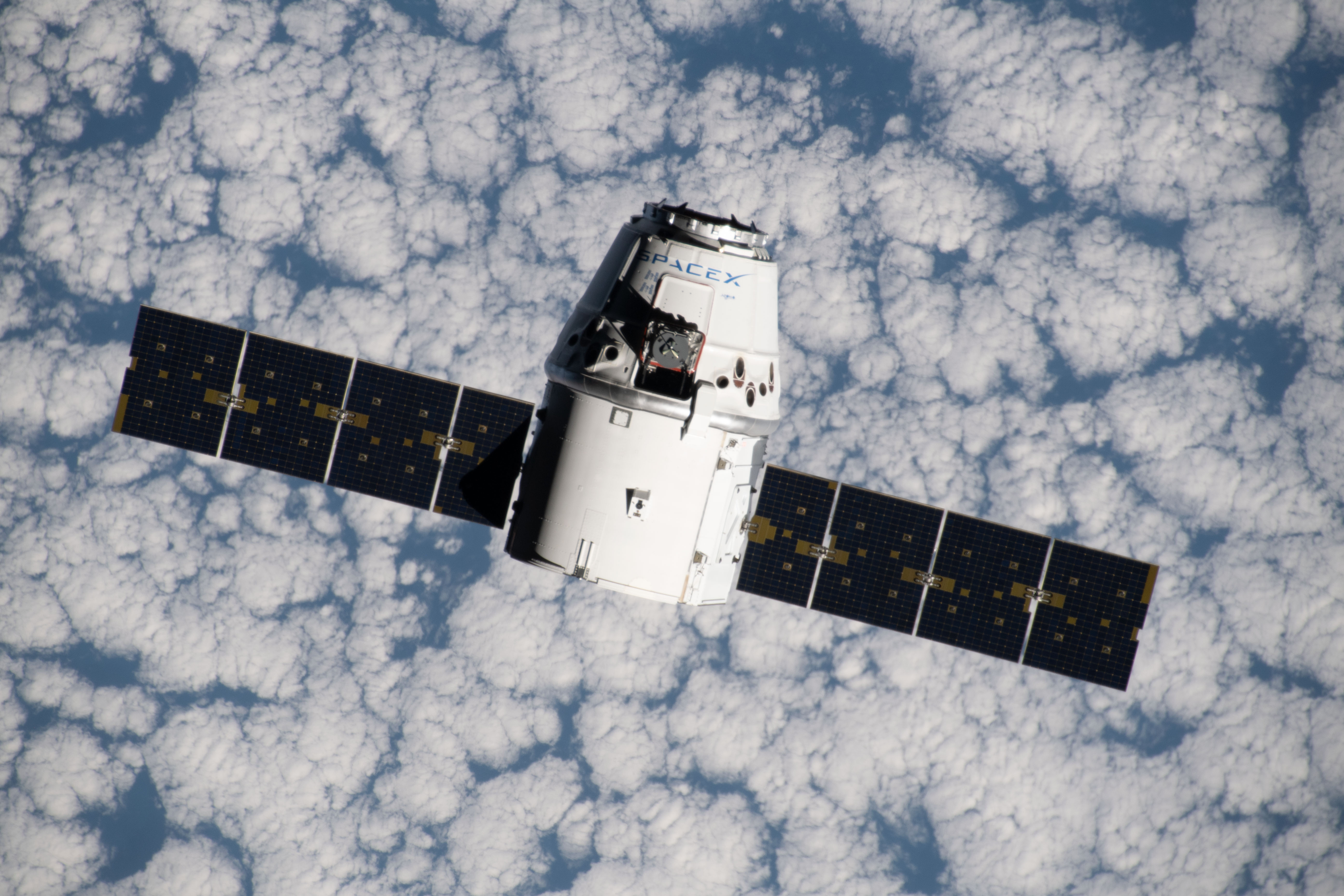
- Dragon C108.3 approaching the ISS
- Names: SpX-18
- Mission type: ISS resupply
- Operator: SpaceX
- COSPAR ID: 2019-044A
- SATCAT no.: 44446
- Mission duration: 32 days, 22 hours, 19 minutes

Spacecraft properties
- Spacecraft: Dragon 1 C108
- Spacecraft type: Dragon 1
- Manufacturer: SpaceX
- Dry mass: 4,200 kg (9,300 lb)
- Dimensions: Height: 6.1 m (20 ft); Diameter: 3.7 m (12 ft)

Start of mission
- Launch date: 25 July 2019 22:01 UTC
- Rocket: Falcon 9 Block 5 B1056-2
- Launch site: Cape Canaveral, SLC-40

End of mission
- Disposal: Recovered
- Landing date: 27 August 2019 20:20 UTC
- Landing site: Pacific Ocean off Baja California

Orbital parameters
- Reference system: Geocentric
- Regime: Low Earth
- Inclination: 51.6°

Berthing at ISS
- Berthing port: Harmony nadir
- RMS capture: 27 July 13:11 UTC
- Berthing date: 27 July 2019 16:01 UTC
- Unberthing date: 27 August 2019 12:25 UTC
- RMS release: 27 August 2019 14:59 UTC
- Time berthed: 30 days, 20 hours, 24 minutes
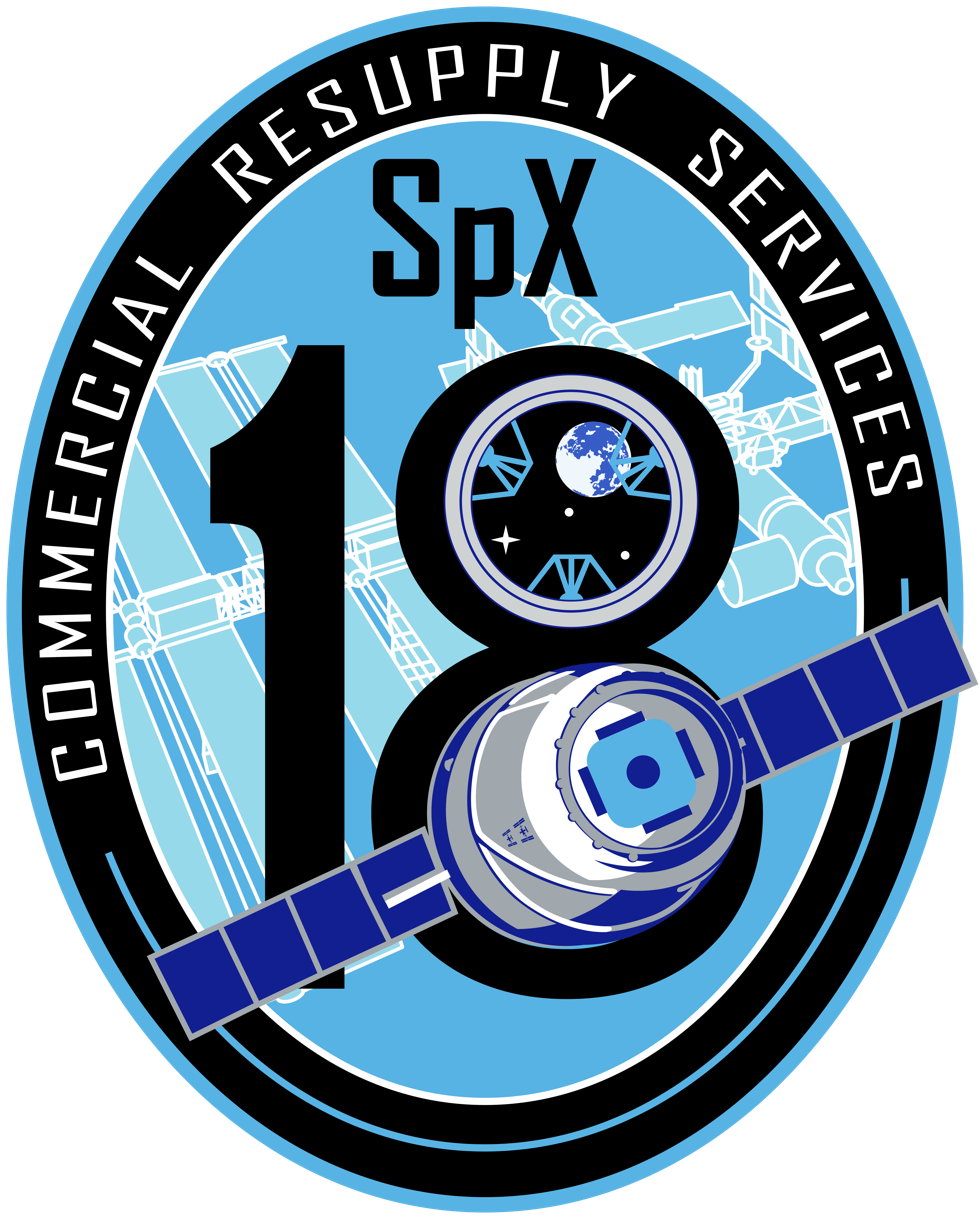
- NASA SpX-18 mission patch Commercial Resupply Services Cargo Dragon

SpaceX CRS-18, also known as SpX-18, was SpaceX's 18th flight to the International Space Station under the Commercial Resupply Services program for NASA. It was launched on 25 July 2019 aboard a Falcon 9 rocket.

The same Dragon capsule has previously flown to the ISS in April 2015 and December 2017. This was the first time a capsule was used for a third flight.

== Primary payload ==
In February 2016, it was announced that NASA had awarded a contract extension to SpaceX for five CRS additional missions (CRS-16 to CRS-20).

NASA has contracted for the CRS-18 mission from SpaceX and therefore determines the primary payload, date/time of launch, and orbital parameters for the Dragon space capsule. It carried the third International Docking Adapter (IDA-3).

The following is a breakdown of cargo bound for the ISS:

- Science investigations: 1,192 kg (2,628 lb)
- Crew supplies: 233 kg (514 lb)
- Vehicle hardware: 157 kg (346 lb)
- Spacewalk equipment: 157 kg (346 lb)
- Computer resources: 17 kg (37 lb)
- External payloads: IDA-3 534 kg (1,177 lb)

The Dragon spacecraft also featured a handful of ceramic heat shield tiles, meant to flight-test a critical component of the SpaceX Starship spacecraft.

== Gallery ==
SpaceX CRS-18
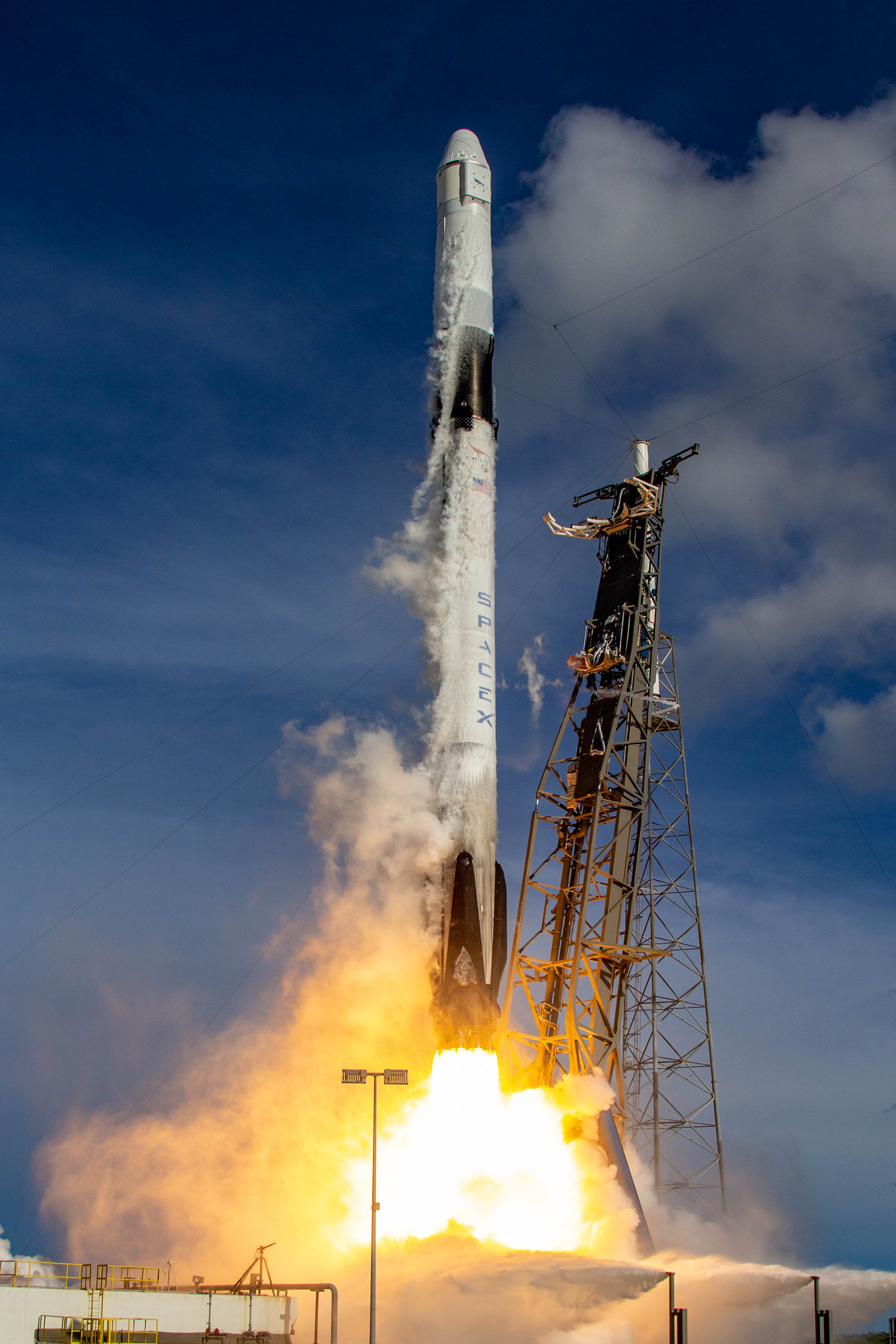
Launch of CRS-18

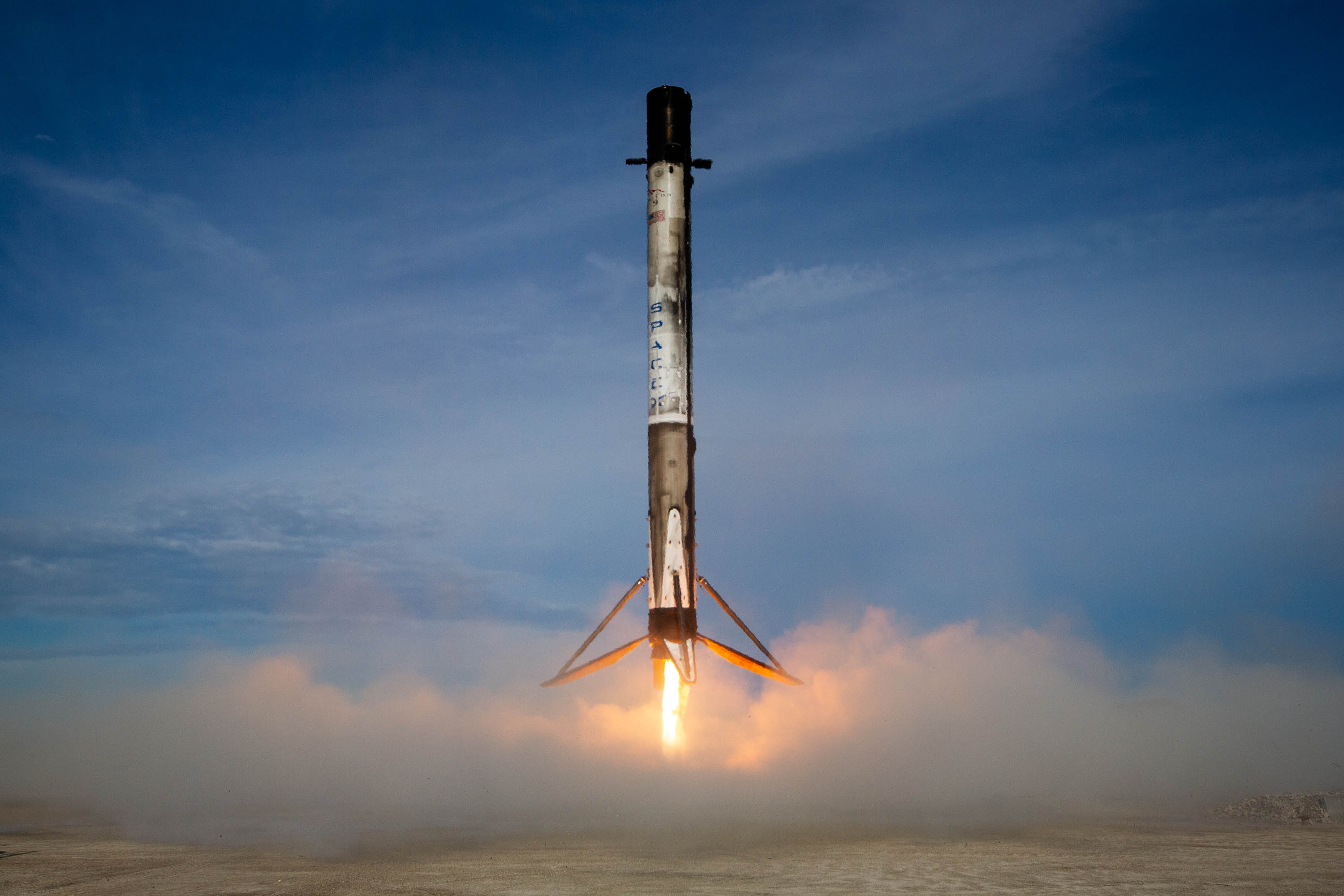
Falcon 9 landing at LZ-1

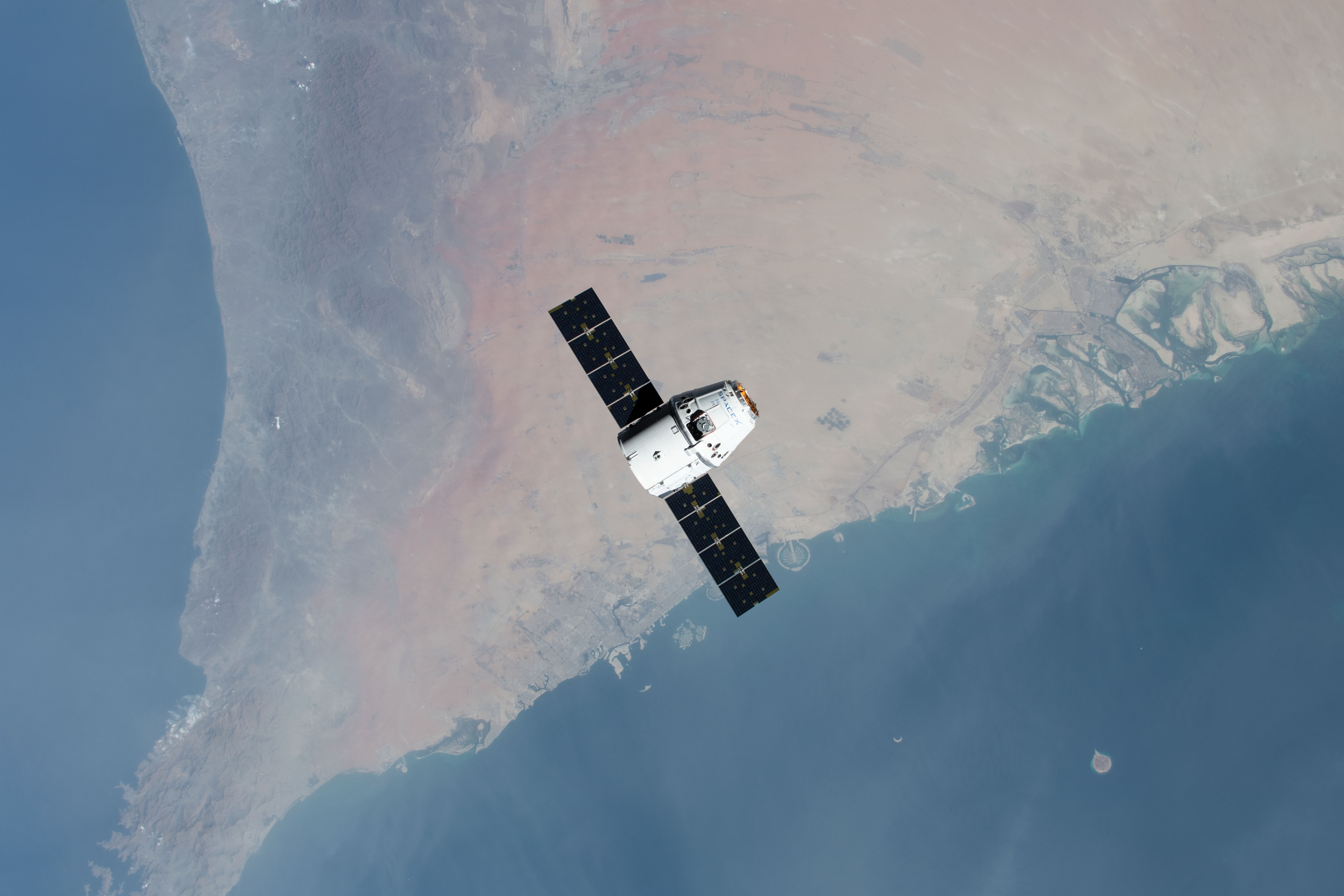
Dragon approaching the ISS

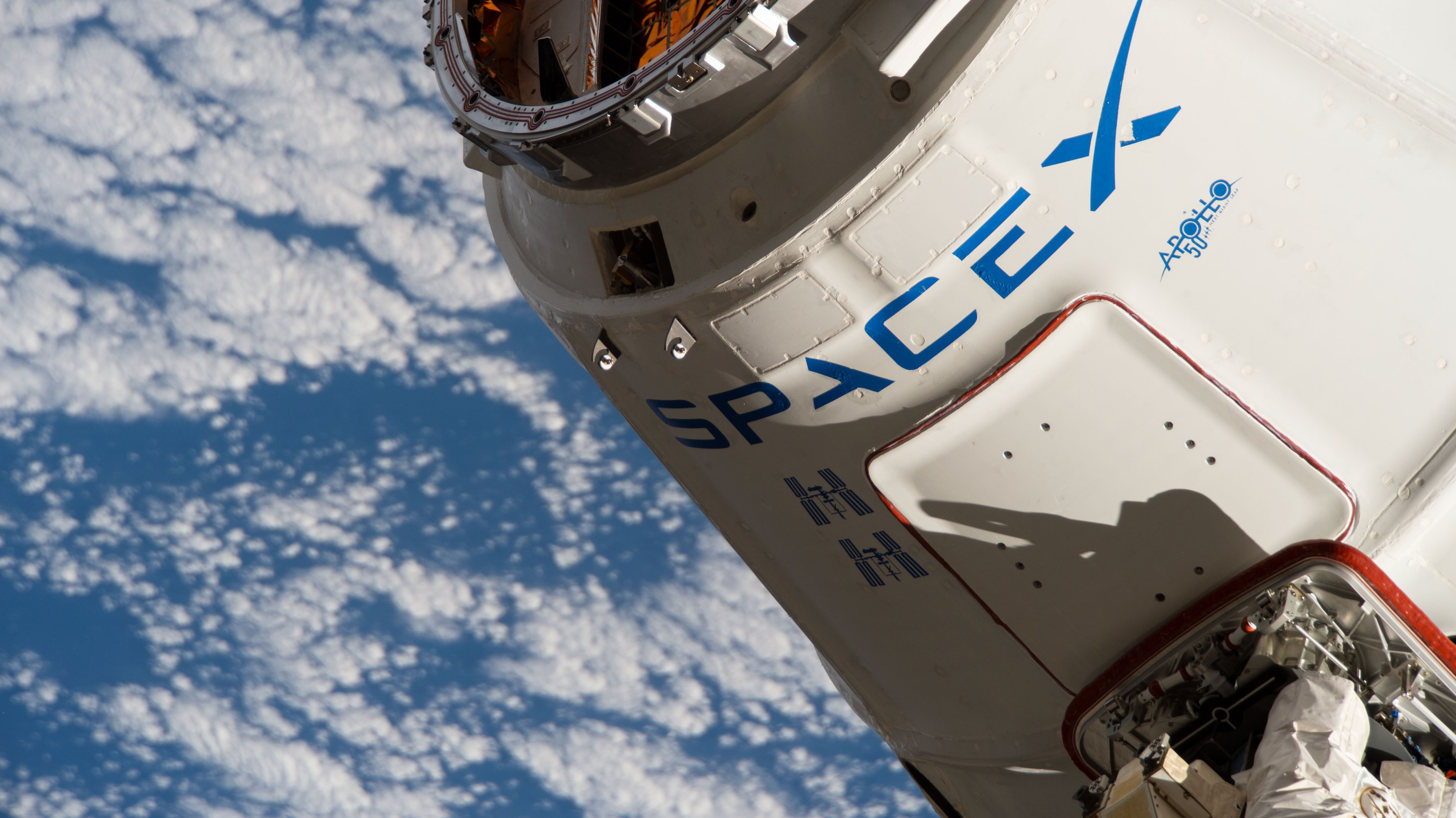
Dragon decals indicating two prior flights

== See also ==
- Uncrewed spaceflights to the International Space Station
