= Maintenance of the International Space Station =

Servicing of the crewed low-Earth orbital research platform

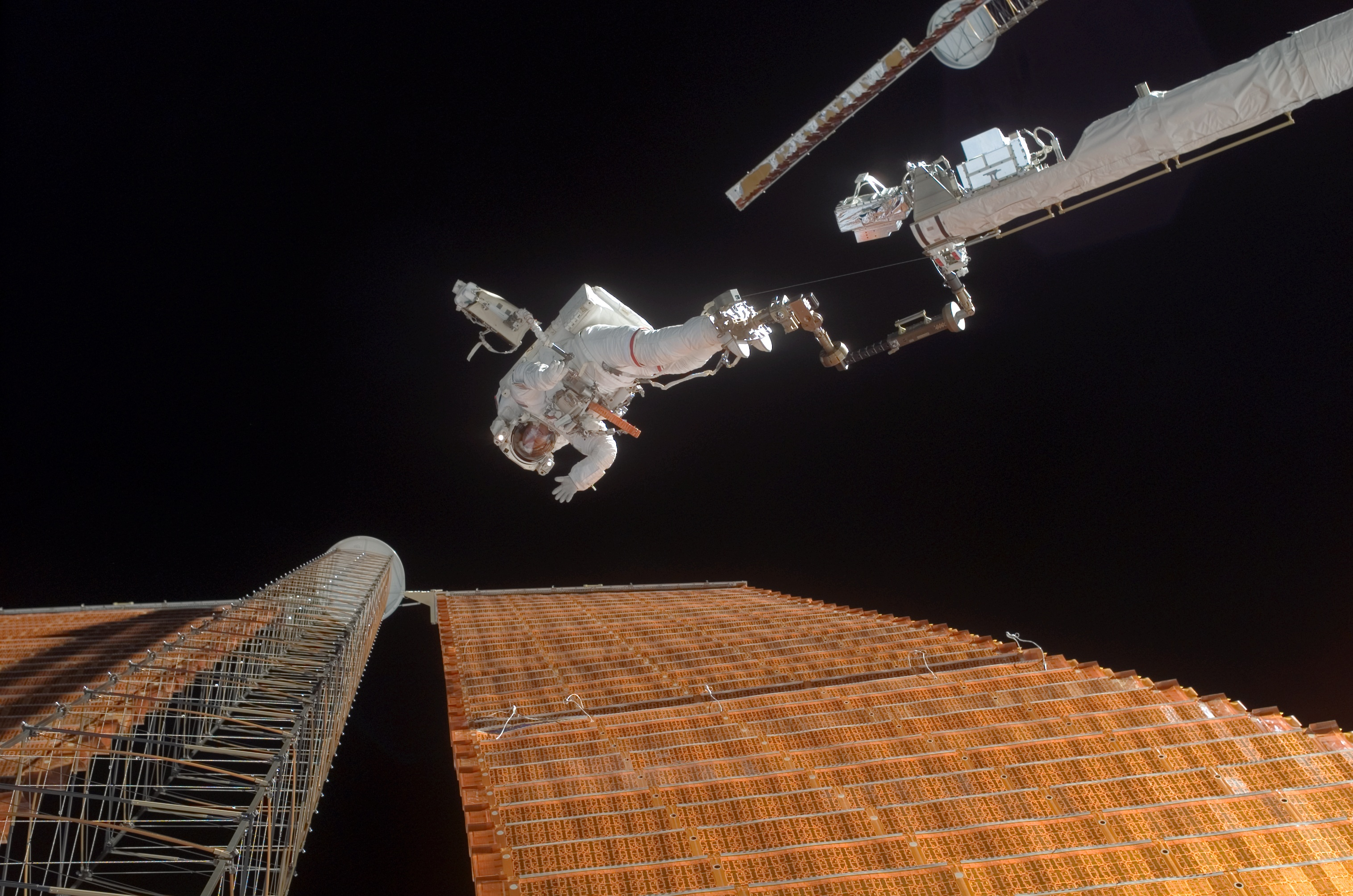
Astronaut Scott Parazynski of STS-120 conducted a 7-hour, 19-minute spacewalk to repair (essentially sew) a damaged solar panel which helps supply power to the International Space Station. NASA considered the spacewalk dangerous with potential risk of electrical shock.

Since construction started, the International Space Station program has had to deal with several maintenance issues, unexpected problems and failures. These incidents have affected the assembly timeline, led to periods of reduced capabilities of the station and in some cases could have forced the crew to abandon the space station for safety reasons, had these problems not been resolved.

== 2003 – Waste accumulation after the Columbia disaster ==
The Columbia disaster did not involve the ISS, but did impact the ISS construction schedule and maintenance.

The Space Shuttle Columbia disaster on 1 February 2003 (during STS-107, a non-ISS mission) resulted in a two-and-a-half-year suspension of the US Space Shuttle program. Another one-year suspension following STS-114 (because of continued foam shedding on the external tank) led to some uncertainty about the future of the International Space Station. All crew exchanges between February 2003 and July 2006 were carried out using the Russian Soyuz spacecraft; a STS-114 visit in July 2005 was purely logistical. Starting with Expedition 7, caretaker crews of just two astronauts were launched, in contrast to the previously launched crews of three. Because the ISS had not been visited by a space shuttle for over three years, more waste had accumulated than anticipated, which temporarily hindered station operations in 2004. Automated Progress transports and the STS-114 mission were able to eliminate this waste build-up.

== 2004 – Air leak and Elektron oxygen generator failure ==
On 2 January 2004, a minor air leak was detected on board the ISS. At one point, five pounds of air per day were leaking into space and the internal pressure of the ISS dropped from nominal 14.7 psi down to 14.0 psi, although this did not pose an immediate threat to Michael Foale and Aleksandr Kaleri, the two astronauts on board.

Using an ultrasonic probe (CTRL UL101), Foale traced the leak on Sunday 10 January to a vacuum jumper hose connected to a multipaned window in the US segment of the station. The search for the leak had been hampered by noise emitted from scientific equipment on board. Successful identification and repair of the leak narrowly averted a planned lock down of the station in an attempt to isolate the leak, which would have affected station operations. Experts believe the leak was caused by astronauts using the hose as a handhold.

In this same year, 2004, the Elektron unit shut down due to (initially) unknown causes. Two weeks of troubleshooting resulted in the unit starting up again, then immediately shutting down. The cause was eventually traced to gas bubbles in the unit, which remained non-functional until a Progress resupply mission in October 2004. In 2005 ISS personnel tapped into the oxygen supply of the recently arrived Progress resupply ship, when the Elektron unit failed.

== 2005 – Elektron oxygen generator fails again ==
Early on 1 January 2005, the Elektron generator, repaired in 2004, failed again, and the crew had to rely again on onboard oxygen. The Elektron generator was later fixed.

== 2006 – Venting of gas ==
On 18 September 2006, the Expedition 13 crew activated a smoke alarm in the Russian segment of the International Space Station when fumes from one of the three Elektron oxygen generators triggered momentary fear about a possible fire. The crew initially reported a smell in the cabin. The alarm was later found to be caused by a leak of potassium hydroxide from an oxygen vent. The associated equipment was turned off, and officials said there was no fire and the crew was not in any danger.

The station's ventilation system was shut down to prevent the possibility of spreading smoke or contaminants through the rest of the complex. A charcoal air filter was put in place to scrub the atmosphere of any lingering potassium hydroxide fumes. The space station's program manager said the crew never donned gas masks, but as a precaution put on surgical gloves and masks to prevent contact with any contaminants.

On 2 November 2006, the payload brought by the Russian Progress M-58 allowed the crew to repair the Elektron using spare parts.

== 2007 – Computer failure ==
On 14 June 2007, during Expedition 15 and flight day 7 of STS-117's visit to ISS, a computer malfunction on the Russian segments at 06:30 UTC left the station without thrusters, oxygen generation, carbon dioxide scrubber, and other environmental control systems, causing the temperature on the station to rise. A successful restart of the computers resulted in a false fire alarm that woke the crew at 11:43 UTC.

By 15 June, the primary Russian computers were back online, and communicating with the US side of the station by bypassing a circuit, but secondary systems remained offline. NASA reported that without the computer that controls the oxygen levels, the station had 56 days of oxygen available.

By the afternoon of 16 June, ISS Program Manager Michael Suffredini confirmed that all six computers governing command and navigation systems for Russian segments of the station, including two thought to have failed, were back online and would be tested over several days. The cooling system was the first system brought back online. Troubleshooting of the failure by the ISS crew found that the root cause was condensation inside the electrical connectors, which led to a short-circuit that triggered the power off command to all three of the redundant processing units. This was initially a concern because the European Space Agency uses the same computer systems, supplied by EADS Astrium Space Transportation, for the Columbus laboratory module and the Automated Transfer Vehicle. Once the cause of the malfunction was understood, plans were implemented to avoid the problem in the future.

== 2007 – Torn solar panel ==
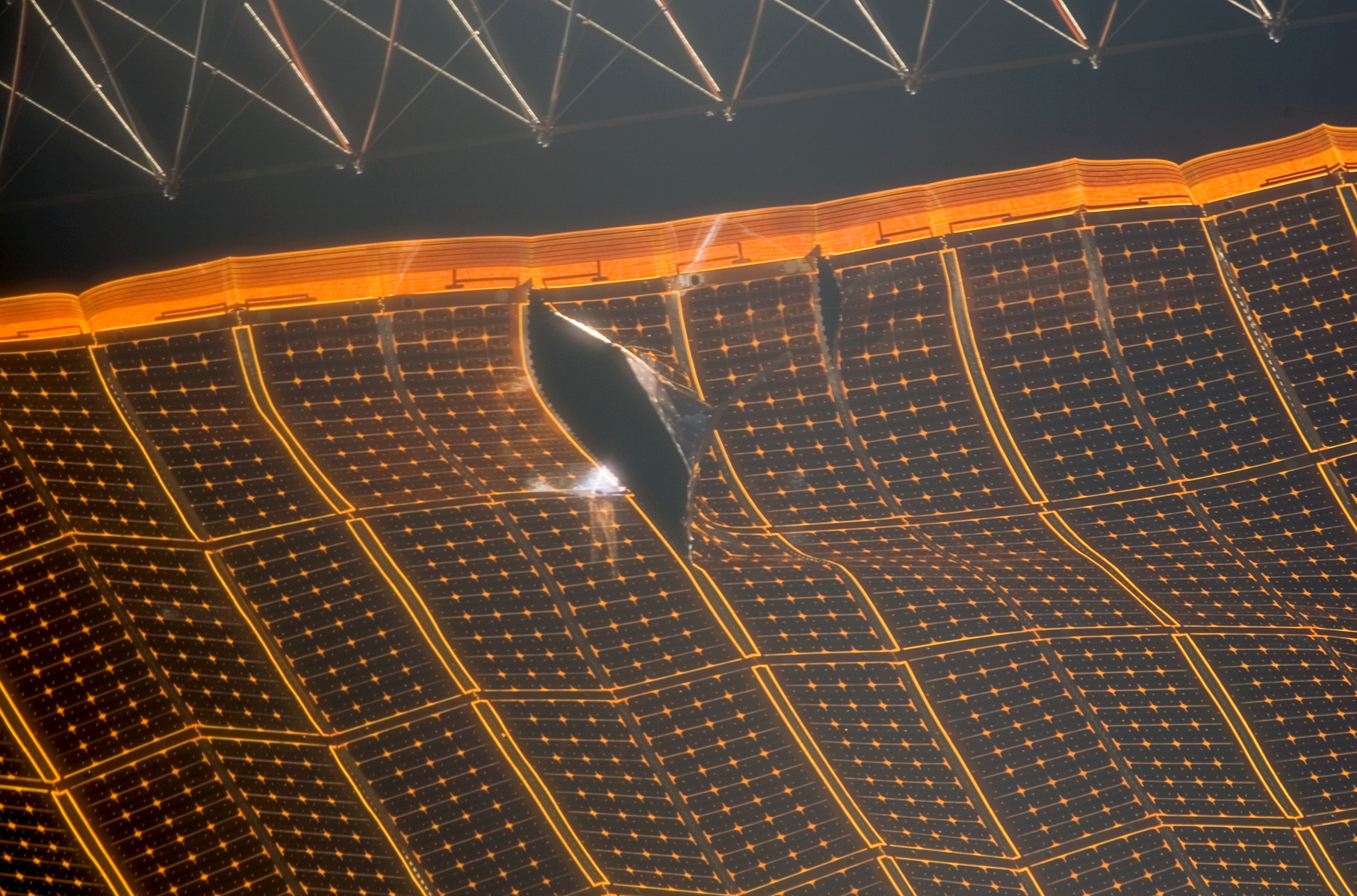
Damage to the 4B wing of the P6 solar array found when it was redeployed after being moved to its final position on STS-120

On 30 October 2007, during Expedition 16 and flight day 7 of STS-120's visit to ISS, following the repositioning of the P6 truss segment, ISS and Space Shuttle Discovery crew members began the deployment of the two solar arrays on the truss. The first array deployed without incident, and the second array deployed about 80% before astronauts noticed a 76-centimetre (2.5 ft) tear. The arrays had been deployed in earlier phases of the space station's construction, and the retraction necessary to move the truss to its final position had gone less smoothly than planned.

A second, smaller tear was noticed upon further inspection, and the mission's spacewalks were replanned in order to devise a repair. Normally, such spacewalks take several months to plan and are settled upon well in advance. On 3 November, spacewalker Scott Parazynski, assisted by Douglas Wheelock, fixed the torn panels using makeshift cufflinks and riding on the end of the Space Shuttle's OBSS inspection arm. Parazynski was the first ever spacewalker to use the robotic arm in this way. The spacewalk was regarded as significantly more dangerous than most because of the possibility of shock from the electricity generating solar arrays, the unprecedented usage of the OBSS, and the lack of spacewalk planning and training for the impromptu procedure. Parazynski was able to repair the damage as planned, and the repaired array was fully deployed. Also, the OBSS was kept on the International Space Station because of its demonstrated versatility and ability to be left on the station for longer periods of time.

== 2007 – Damaged starboard Solar Alpha Rotary Joint ==
During STS-120, a problem was detected in the starboard Solar Alpha Rotary Joint (SARJ). This joint, together with a similar device on the port side of the station's truss structure, rotates the large solar arrays to keep them facing the Sun. Excessive vibration and high-current spikes in the array drive motor were noted, resulting in a decision to substantially curtail motion of the starboard SARJ until the cause was understood. Inspections during EVAs on STS-120 and STS-123 showed extensive contamination from metallic shavings and debris in the large drive gear and confirmed damage to the large metallic race ring at the heart of the joint. The station had sufficient operating power to carry out its near-term program with only modest impacts on operations, so to prevent further damage, the joint was locked in place.

On 25 September 2008, NASA announced significant progress in diagnosing the source of the starboard SARJ problem and a program to repair it on orbit. The repair program began with the flight of the Space Shuttle Endeavour on STS-126. The crew carried out servicing of both the starboard and port SARJs, lubricating both joints and replacing 11 of 12 trundle bearings on the starboard SARJ. It was hoped that this servicing would provide a temporary solution to the problem. A long-term solution is a 10-EVA plan called 'SARJ-XL', which calls for the installation of structural supports between the two segments of the SARJ and a new race ring to be inserted between them to completely replace the failed joint. Following the cleaning and lubrication of the joint, the results that have been noted so far have been encouraging, to the point that it is now believed that the joint could be maintained by occasional servicing EVAs by resident station crews. The data from the SARJ requires some time to fully analyse before a decision as to the future of the joint is made.

== 2009 – Excessive vibration during reboost ==
On 14 January 2009, an incorrect command sequence caused the Zvezda service module orbital altitude maintenance rocket propulsion control system to misfire during an altitude re-boost manoeuvre. This resulted in resonant vibrations into the station structure which persisted for over two minutes. While no damage to the station was immediately reported, some components may have been stressed beyond their design limits. Further analysis confirmed that the station was unlikely to have suffered any structural damage, and it appears that "structures will still meet their normal lifetime capability". Further evaluations are under way.

== 2009 – Potential ammonia leak from S1 radiator due to damaged panel ==
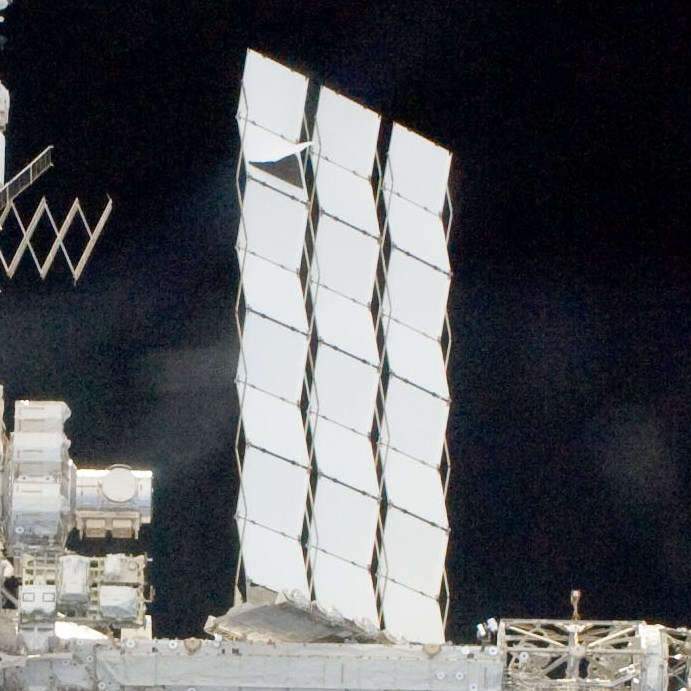
The damaged S1 radiator on the ISS starboard truss

The S1-3 radiator has a damaged cooling panel that may require on-orbit repair or replacement, as the damage may have the potential to create a leak in the External Thermal Control System (ETCS) of the station, possibly leading to unacceptable loss of the ammonia coolant.

There are six such radiators, three on the starboard truss, and three on the port truss, each consisting of 8 panels. They appear as the large white pleated objects extending in the aft direction from the trusses, between the central habitable modules and the large solar panel arrays at the ends of the truss structure, and control the temperature of the ISS by dumping excess heat to space. The panels are double-sided, and radiate from both sides, with ammonia circulating between the top and bottom surfaces.

The problem was first noticed in Soyuz imagery in September 2008, but was not thought to be serious. The imagery showed that the surface of one sub-panel has peeled back from the underlying central structure, possibly due to micro-meteoroid or debris impact. It is also known that a Service Module thruster cover, jettisoned during a spacewalk in 2008, had struck the S1 radiator, but its effect, if any, has not been determined. Further imagery during the fly-around from STS-119 raised concerns that structural fatigue, due to thermal cycling stress, could cause a serious leak to develop in the ammonia cooling loop, although there is as yet no evidence of a leak or of degradation in the thermal performance of the panel. Various options for repair are under consideration, including replacement of the entire S1 radiator in a future flight, possibly with return of the damaged unit to ground for detailed study.

On 15 May 2009, the damaged radiator panel's ammonia tubing was mechanically shut off from the ETCS, by the computer-controlled closure of a valve. The same valve was used immediately afterwards to vent the ammonia from the damaged panel. This eliminates the possibility of an ammonia leak from the cooling system via the damaged panel.

== 2010 – Failure in cooling loop A ==
Early on 1 August 2010, a failure in cooling Loop A (starboard side), one of two external cooling loops, left the station with only half of its normal cooling capacity and zero redundancy in some systems. The problem appeared to be in the ammonia pump module that circulates the ammonia cooling fluid. Several subsystems, including two of the four CMGs, were shut down. The failed ammonia pump was returned to Earth during STS-135 to undergo root cause failure analysis.

Planned operations on the ISS were interrupted through a series of EVAs to address the cooling system issue. A first EVA on Saturday, 7 August 2010, to replace the failed pump module, was not fully completed due to an ammonia leak in one of four quick-disconnects. A second EVA on Wednesday, 11 August, successfully removed the failed pump module. A third EVA was required to restore Loop A to normal functionality.

== 2011 – Near collision with space debris ==
On 28 June 2011, an unidentified piece of space debris was predicted to pass near the space station with a 1 in 360 chance of collision. The object flew by at a relative velocity of 29,000 mph (47,000 km/h) and a distance of only 1,100 feet (340 m) from the station. Warning of the potential collision came less than 15 hours before closest approach leaving insufficient time to plan an avoidance maneuver, so the six-person crew boarded the Soyuz capsules and closed the hatches on the station and Soyuz to prepare to undock in the event of an impact. Four minutes after the moment of closest approach, mission controllers gave the all-clear signal meaning that the danger had passed and the crew could return to work. This was the second time that crew had needed to take such precautions on board the space station.

== 2011–2012 – Failure of Main Bus Switching Unit #1 and replacement EVA ==
The four Main Bus Switching Units (MBSUs, located in the S0 truss), control the routing of power from the four solar array wings to the rest of the ISS. In late 2011 MBSU-1, while still routing power correctly, ceased responding to commands or sending data confirming its health, and was scheduled to be swapped out at the next available EVA. In each MBSU, two power channels feed 160V DC from the arrays to two DC-to-DC power converters (DDCUs) that supply the 124V power used in the station. A spare MBSU was already on board, but the 30 August 2012 EVA failed to be completed when a bolt being tightened to finish installation of the spare unit jammed before electrical connection was secured. The loss of MBSU-1 limited the station to 75% of its normal power capacity, requiring minor limitations of normal operations until the issue was addressed.

A second EVA to tighten the balky bolt, to complete the installation of the replacement MBSU-1 in an attempt to restore full power, was scheduled for Wednesday, 5 September. Yet in the meantime, a third solar array wing went offline due to some fault in that array's Direct Current Switching Unit (DCSU) or its associated system, further reducing ISS power to just five of the eight solar array wings for the first time in several years.

On 5 September 2012, in a second, 6 hour, EVA to replace MBSU-1, astronauts Suni Williams and Aki Hoshide successfully restored the ISS to 100% power.

== 2012 – Failure of primary Carbon Dioxide Removal Assembly (CDRA) ==
The ISS has two rack sized CDRAs (Carbon Dioxide Removal Assemblies) for redundancy with the Lab CDRA primary and the Node 3 CDRA as a powered off backup because of issues with sticking valves in the Node 3. It can step in as a backup if necessary but is not the preferred CDRA because of the problems with the sticking Air Selector Valves (ASVs). The Russian segment has its own carbon dioxide scrubbers but they are not sufficient for the whole of the ISS.

On 16 June 2012 the lab CDRA suddenly shut down. This problem was traced to a failure of the second of three temperature sensors (the first one had failed previously) and it was quickly restored. On 20 June it shut down again due to erratic data from the one remaining temperature sensor. ISS decided to put the Lab CDRA into standby and activate the Node 3 CDRA instead, even with its valve sticking issues.

== 2013 – Ammonia Leak and CDRA issues again ==
On 9 May 2013, at around 3:30 p.m. UTC, the ISS crew reported seeing small white flakes floating away from the Station's truss structure. Analysis of the crew reports and images captured by external cameras confirmed a leak of ammonia coolant. Two days later a spacewalk was undertaken in order to inspect and possibly replace a pump controller box suspected of leaking.

In early September one of the Air Selector Valves in the CDRA was removed and replaced, but problems with sticking valves persisted, and Node 3 had to be restarted several times. The ISS at this point had no new ASVs to install, so if more further issues arose, it would have to rely on reinstalling previously used valves which they retained as "contingency" backups, which are in a degraded state.

== 2018 – Leak in Soyuz Orbital Module ==
On 29 August 2018, at 11:00 p.m. UTC, a small pressure leak was observed in the Russian segment of the ISS. The crew were allowed to sleep as mission controllers determined there was no danger to them, and investigation the following day revealed a 2mm hole near the hatch of the Soyuz spacecraft. The hole was temporarily covered with Kapton tape, and then with an on-board patch kit. Neither was sufficient to completely plug the leak. Sealant was later applied, which finally stabilised the station's pressure. The hole was identified as a drill hole made by an "unsteady hand", potentially during manufacturing or when already in orbit, according to Roscosmos chief Dmitry Rogozin.

== 2019 – ongoing – Pressure leak ==
In September 2019, a higher-than-normal air leak was detected on the station. In August 2020, after the leak had slightly increased, ISS crew started investigating the issue. On 29 September 2020 the leak was isolated in the Zvezda Service Module. The leak was tracked down on 15 October and an attempt was made to patch it. Another leak in the same section has led to consideration of sealing off the affected section using oxygen reserves, but this would impact the overall operation of the ISS. Despite multiple attempts of investigating and sealing the leaks over several years, they are still present as of February 2025. Roscosmos is limiting the use of the affected area and takes extra measures during cargo operations on the docked Progress spacecrafts. Risks related to the leak are classified as both high likelihood and high consequence. On June 13th 2025 Roscosmos stated that following the repair efforts earlier in the month, the Zvezda Service Module has been completed sealed. However, later analysis indicated there was another leak in the transfer chamber of Zvezda, although now at a much smaller rate. In January 2026 NASA spokesperson confirmed that pressure inside the chamber has become stable, however new leaks were reported following unloading of Progress MS-34 in May 2026.
