= SpaceX CRS-6 =

2015 American resupply spaceflight to the ISS

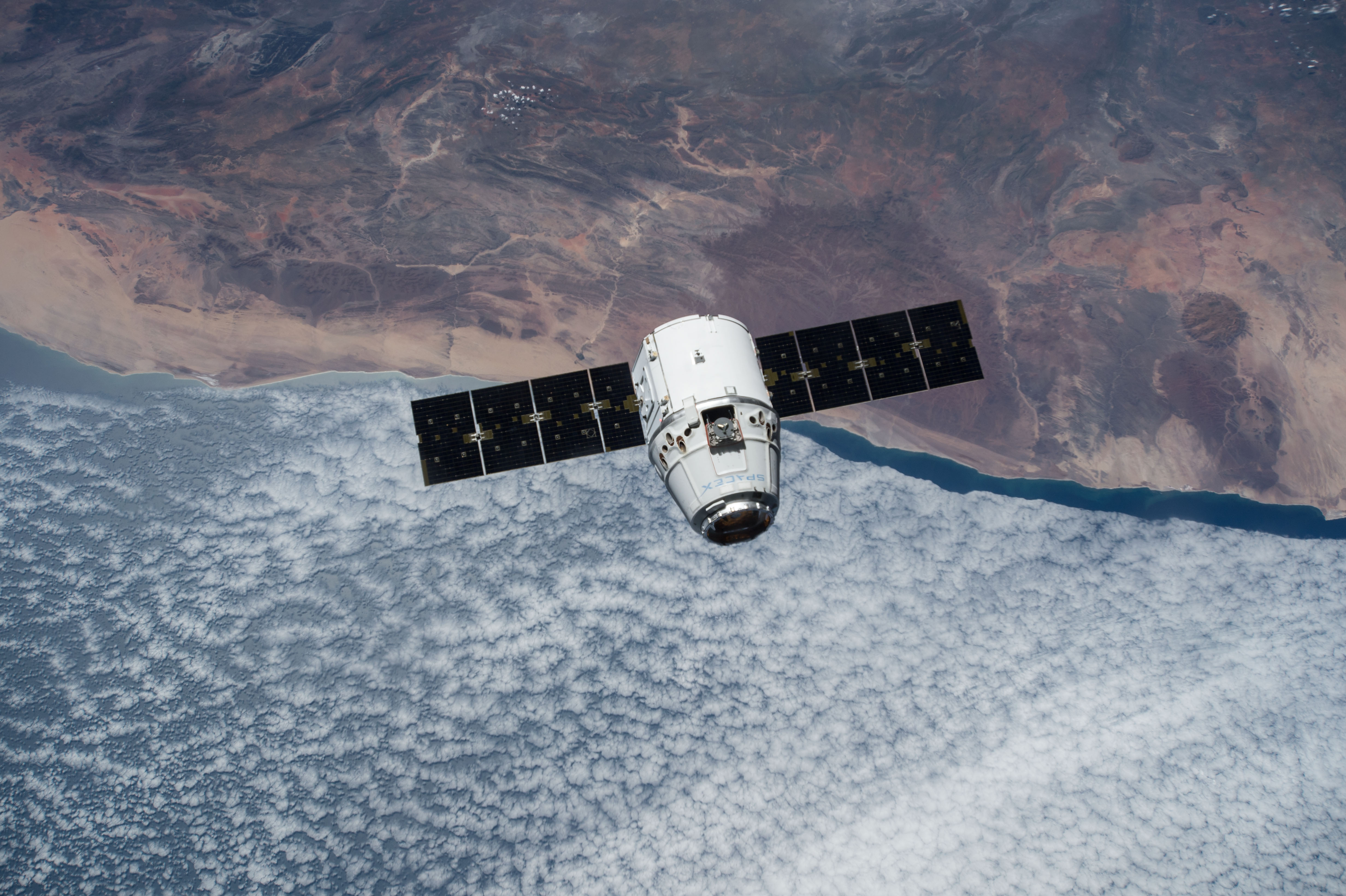
- The SpaceX CRS-6 Dragon spacecraft as seen from the ISS on 17 April 2015
- Names: SpX-6
- Mission type: ISS resupply
- Operator: SpaceX
- COSPAR ID: 2015-021A
- SATCAT no.: 40588
- Mission duration: 36 days, 20 hours, 31 minutes

Spacecraft properties
- Spacecraft: Dragon 1 C108
- Spacecraft type: Dragon 1
- Manufacturer: SpaceX
- Launch mass: 6,000 kg (13,000 lb)
- Dimensions: Height: 8.1 m (27 ft); Diameter: 4 m (13 ft)

Start of mission
- Launch date: 14 April 2015, 20:10:41 UTC
- Rocket: Falcon 9 v1.1 (B1015)
- Launch site: Cape Canaveral, SLC-40
- Contractor: SpaceX

End of mission
- Disposal: Recovered
- Landing date: 21 May 2015, 16:42 UTC
- Landing site: Pacific Ocean

Orbital parameters
- Reference system: Geocentric orbit
- Regime: Low Earth orbit
- Inclination: 51.65°

Berthing at ISS
- Berthing port: Harmony nadir
- RMS capture: 17 April 2015, 10:55 UTC
- Berthing date: 17 April 2015, 13:29 UTC
- Unberthing date: 21 May 2015, 09:29 UTC
- RMS release: 21 May 2015, 11:04 UTC
- Time berthed: 33 days, 20 hours

Cargo
- Mass: 2,015 kg (4,442 lb)
- Pressurised: 2,015 kg (4,442 lb)
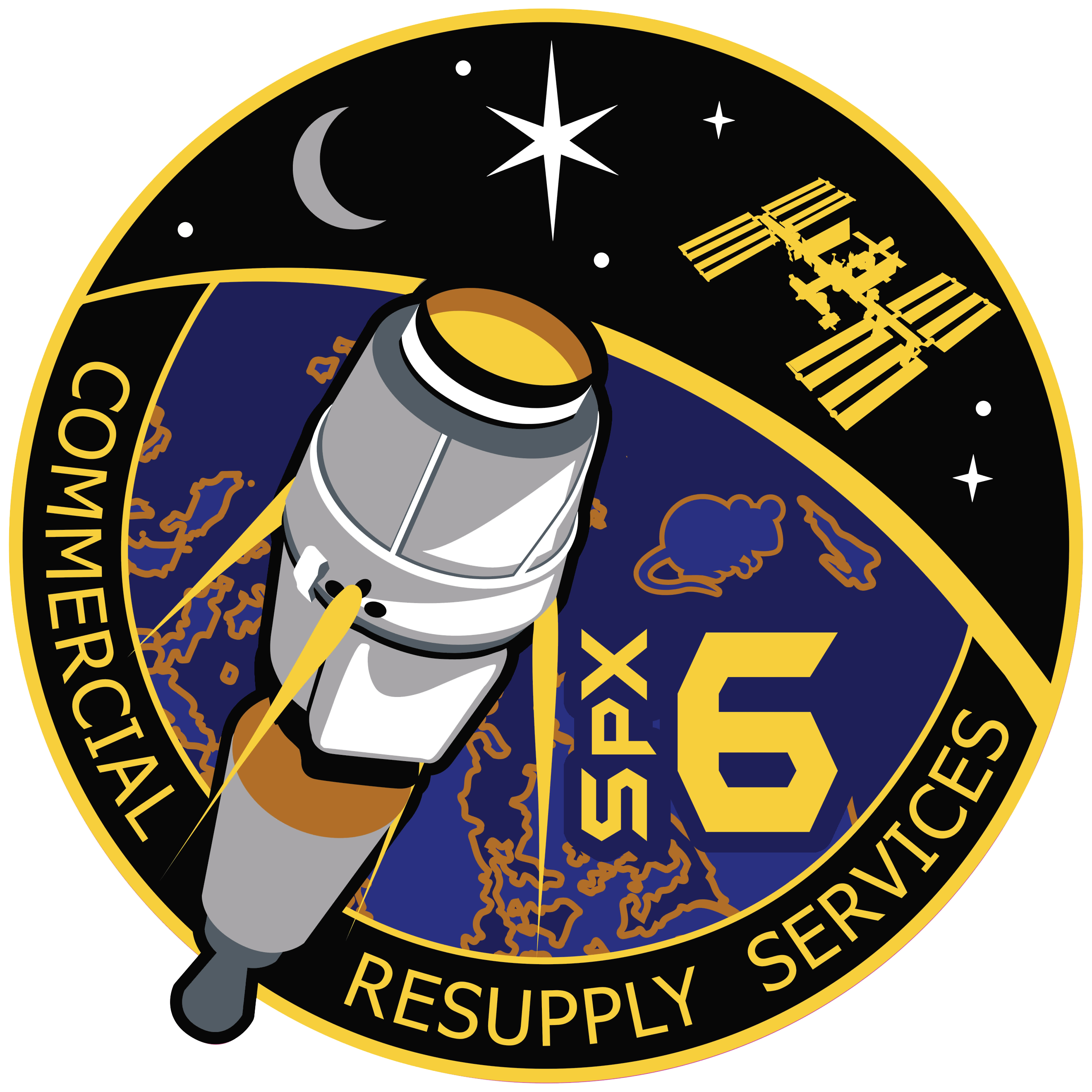
- NASA SpX-6 mission patch Commercial Resupply Services Cargo Dragon

SpaceX CRS-6, also known as SpX-6, was a Commercial Resupply Service mission to the International Space Station, contracted to NASA. It was the eighth flight for SpaceX's uncrewed Dragon cargo spacecraft and the sixth SpaceX operational mission contracted to NASA under a Commercial Resupply Services contract. It was docked to the International Space Station from 17 April to 21 May 2015.

== Launch history ==
In July 2014, the launch was scheduled by NASA for February 2015, with berthing to the station occurring two days later. However, as a result of delays in the launch of the previous SpaceX CRS-5 mission, SpaceX CRS-6 launched on 14 April 2015. In late March, 2015, the launch was scheduled for 13 April 2015, but was later postponed to 14 April 2015 due to weather conditions.

A Federal Communications Commission (FCC) application submitted for temporary communication frequency authority noted the launch planning date as no earlier than 8 April 2015. The application also confirmed communication uplinks for use with the first stage of this mission as it attempted to conduct a first-ever propulsive landing on the Autonomous spaceport drone ship after staging.

== Payload ==
=== Primary payload ===
NASA has contracted for the CRS-6 mission from SpaceX and therefore determines the primary payload, date/time of launch, and orbital parameters for the Dragon space capsule. The Dragon spacecraft was filled with 2,015 kg (4,442 lb) of supplies and payloads, including critical materials to directly support about 40 of the more than 250 science and research investigations that will occur during Expedition 43 and Expedition 44.

Among other items on board:

- Planetary Resources will transport an Arkyd 3 — known as Arkyd 3 Reflight — to the ISS aboard Dragon on CRS-6. Planetary plans to deploy the smallsat from the ISS via a Nanoracks-provided service, in an attempt to validate and mature the technology of its Arkyd series of spacecraft. This is the second Arkyd 3 satellite; in October 2014, the first Arkyd 3 satellite was destroyed on launch in the explosion of the Orbital Sciences Corporation Antares launch vehicle carrying it aboard the third Cygnus cargo resupply flight to the ISS.
- Planet Labs will transport 14 Flock-1e Earth observation CubeSat satellites for later deployment from the space station via an agreement with Nanoracks, operator of the Center for the Advancement of Science in Space (CASIS).

=== Secondary payload ===
SpaceX has the primary control over manifesting, scheduling and loading secondary payloads. However, there are certain restrictions included in their contract with NASA that preclude specified hazards on the secondary payloads, and also require contract-specified probabilities of success and safety margins for any SpaceX reboosts of the secondary satellites once the Falcon 9 second stage has achieved its initial low Earth orbit (LEO).

SpaceX CRS-6 included science payloads for studying new ways to possibly counteract the microgravity-induced cell damage seen during spaceflight, the effects of microgravity on the most common cells in bones, gather new insight that could lead to treatments for osteoporosis and muscle wasting conditions, continue studies into astronaut vision changes and test a new material that could one day be used as a synthetic muscle for robotics explorers of the future. Also making the trip was a new espresso machine for space station crews.

A part of this payload includes science experiments from high schools, such as a project from Ambassador High School in Torrance, California.

=== Return payload ===
Dragon returned 1,370 kg (3,020 lb) of cargo to Earth.

== Post-launch flight test ==
After the separation of the second stage, SpaceX conducted a flight test and attempted to return the nearly-empty first stage of the Falcon 9 through the atmosphere and land it on a 90 m × 50 m (300 ft × 160 ft) floating platform called the autonomous spaceport drone ship. The unmanned launch vehicle technically landed on the floating platform, however it came down with too much lateral velocity, tipped over, and was destroyed. Elon Musk later explained that the bipropellant valve was stuck, and therefore the control system could not react rapidly enough for a successful landing.

This was SpaceX's second attempt to land the booster on a floating platform after an earlier test landing attempt in January 2015 had to be abandoned due to weather conditions. The booster was fitted with a variety of technologies to facilitate the flight test, including grid fins and landing legs to facilitate the post-mission test. If successful, this would have been the first time in history that a launch vehicle booster was returned to a vertical landing.

On 15 April 2015, SpaceX released a video of the terminal phase of the descent, the landing, the tip over, and a small deflagration as the stage broke up on the deck of the ASDS.

== Capsule reflight ==
The Dragon capsule used for this mission was successfully flown a second time in December 2017 with SpaceX CRS-13. The capsule made its third and final flight as part of the SpaceX CRS-18 mission on 25 July 2019.

== Gallery ==
SpaceX CRS-6
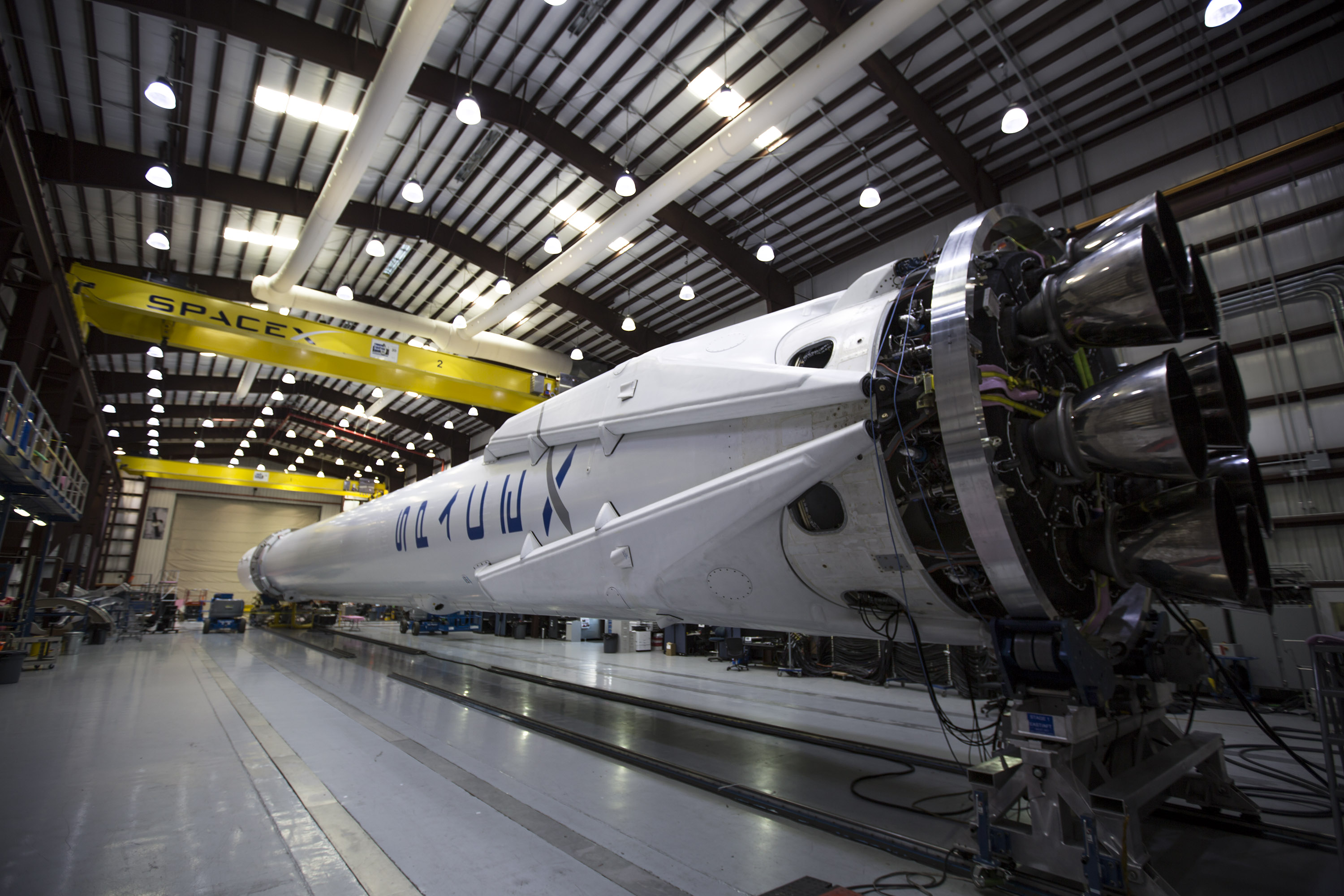
CRS-6 being prepared for launch

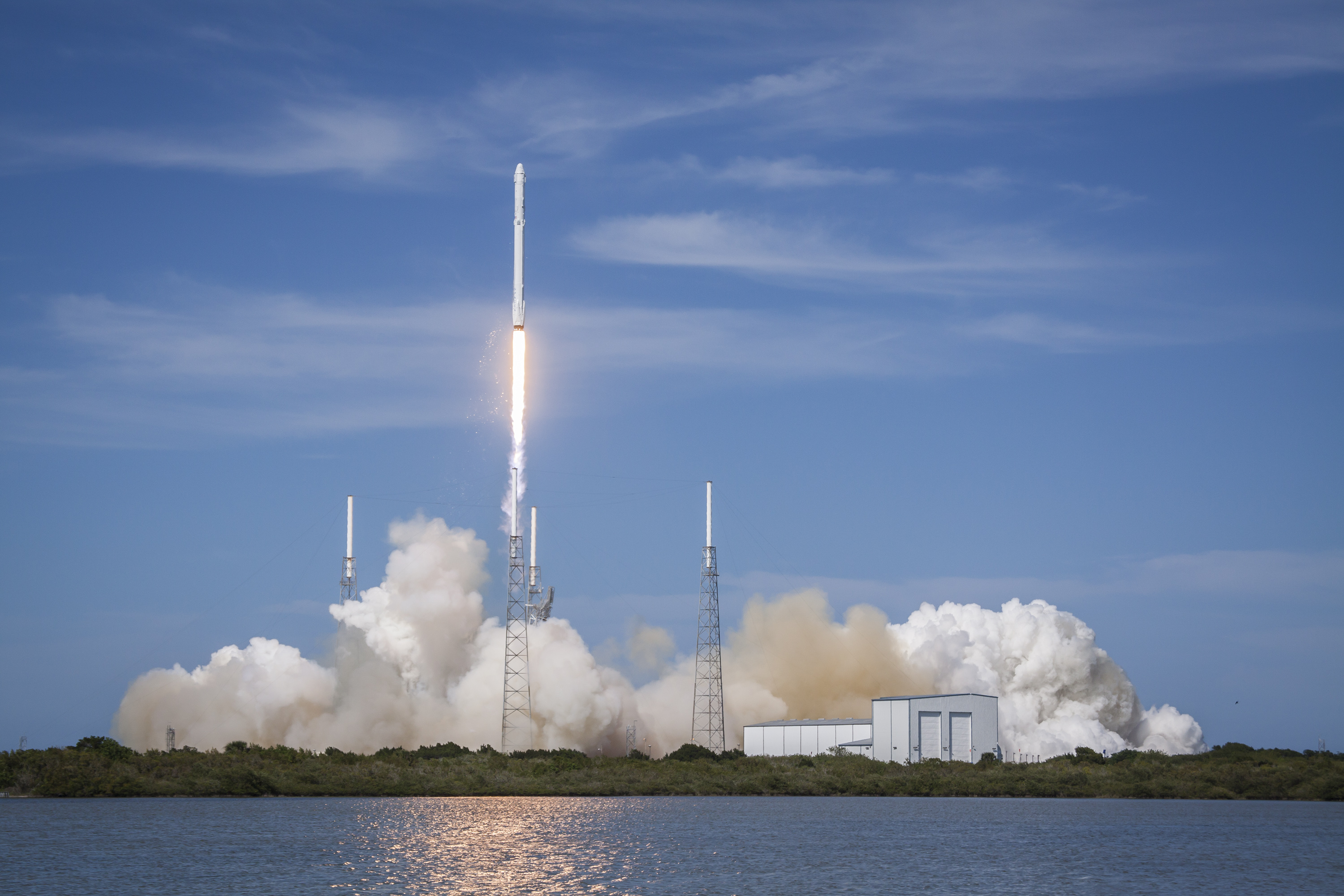
Launch of CRS-6

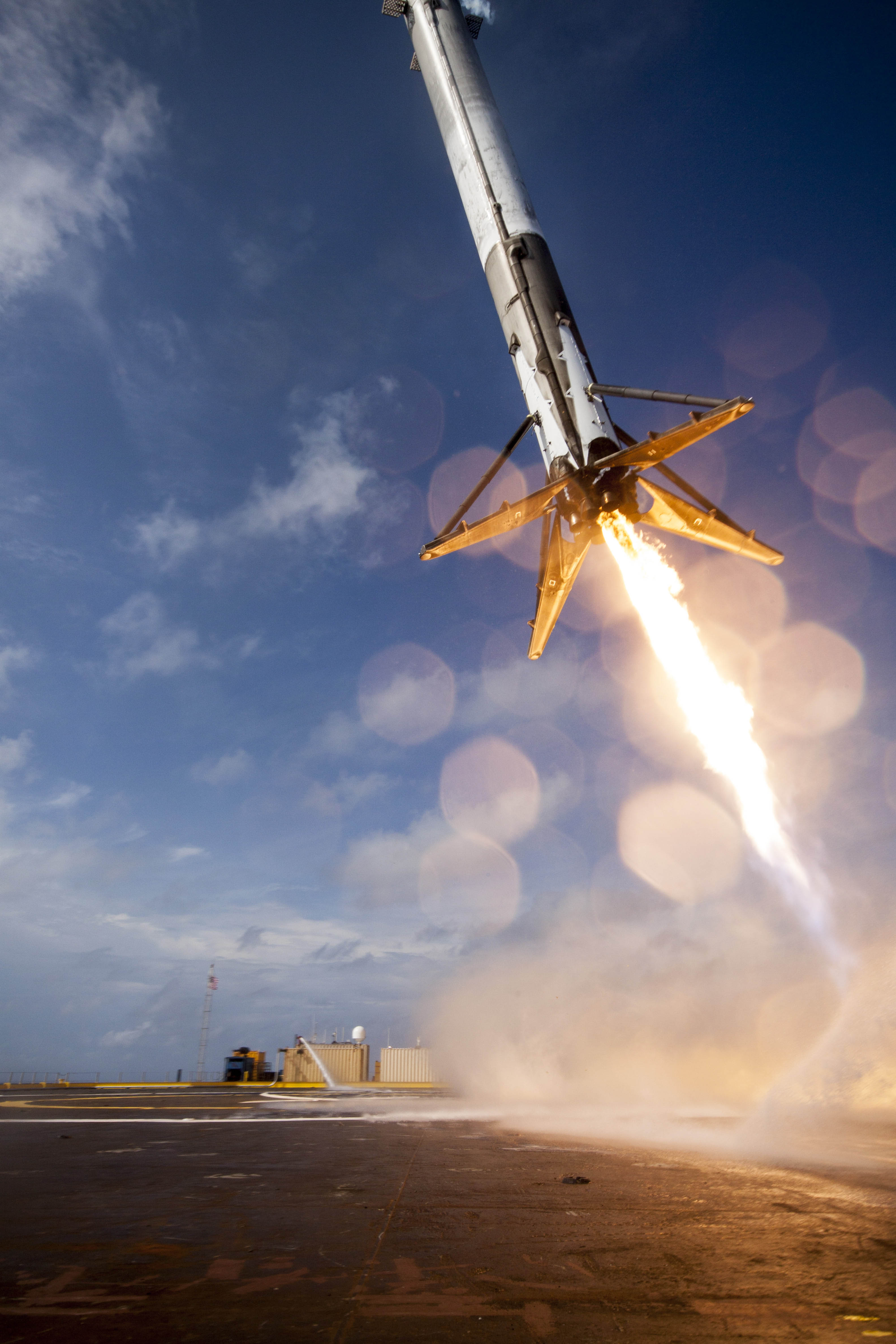
Falcon 9 before impacting the droneship

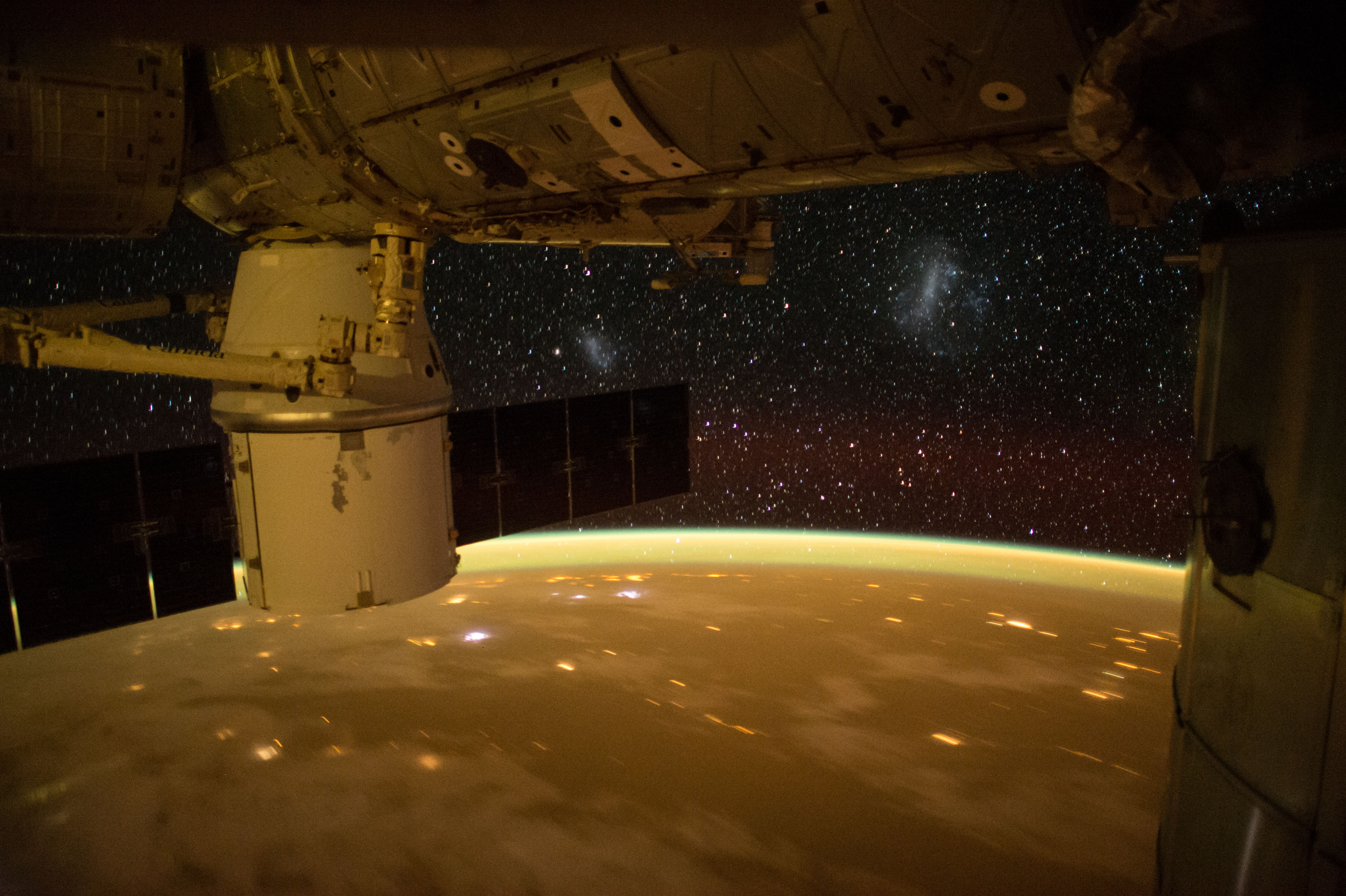
CRS-6 docked to the ISS

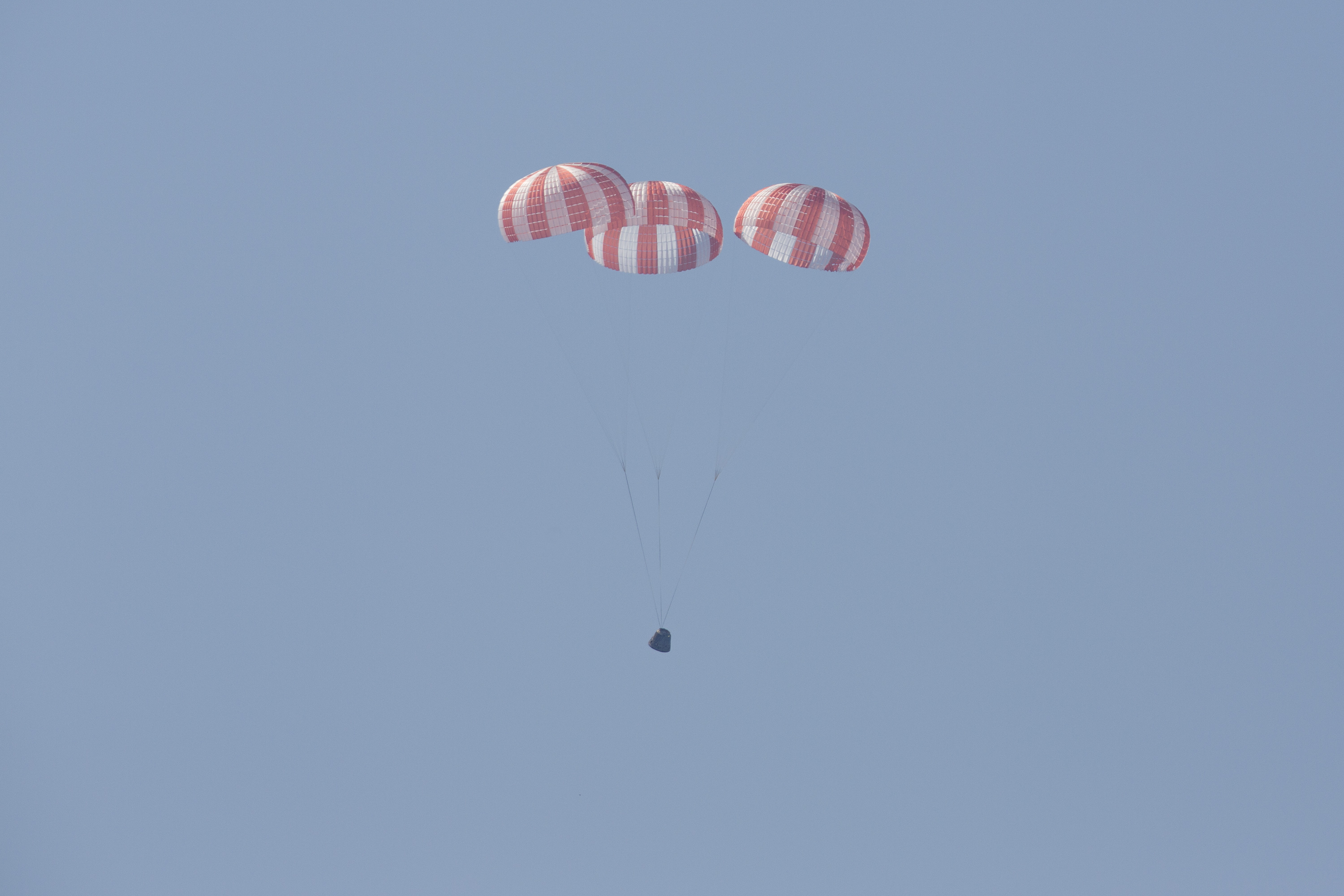
Dragon descending under parachutes

== See also ==
- List of Falcon 9 launches
