= Planetary Resources =

Former American asteroid mining company

- Founded: 1 January 2009
- Founder: Eric D. Anderson; Peter Diamandis
- Defunct: 31 October 2018
- Number of employees: 60 (2019)

Planetary Resources, Inc., formerly known as Arkyd Astronautics, was an American company that was formed on 1 January 2009, and reorganized and renamed in 2012. Its stated goal was to "expand Earth's natural resource base" by developing and deploying the technologies for asteroid mining.

Following financial troubles caused by "delayed investment", it was announced on 31 October 2018, that the company's human assets were purchased by the blockchain software technology company ConsenSys, Inc. In May 2020, ConsenSys made all Planetary Resources intellectual property available to the public domain, and in June 2020, all the remaining hardware assets were auctioned off.

Although the long-term goal of the company was to mine asteroids, its initial plans called for developing a market for small (30–50 kg) cost-reduced space telescopes for Earth observation and astronomy. These spacecraft would have employed a laser-optical system for ground communications, reducing payload bulk and mass compared to conventional RF antennas. The deployment of such orbital telescopes was envisioned as the first step forward in the company's asteroid mining ambitions. The same telescope satellite capabilities that Planetary Resources hoped to sell to customers could have been used to survey and intensively examine near-Earth asteroids.

Planetary launched two test satellites to orbit. Arkyd 3 Reflight (A3R) was launched and successfully transported to Earth orbit on 17 April 2015, on SpaceX's CRS-6 mission, and was deployed from the International Space Station via the NanoRacks CubeSat Deployer on 16 July 2015. Arkyd 6, the company's second satellite, was successfully placed into orbit on 12 January 2018.

== History ==
Planetary Resources, Inc was founded as Arkyd Astronautics on 1 January 2009, with Peter Diamandis as co-chairman and director, and Chris Lewicki as president and chief engineer. According to co-founder Eric C. Anderson, the name "Arkyd Astronautics" was deliberately ambiguous, to help keep the company's asteroid-mining agenda secret.

The company gained media attention in April 2012 with the announcement of a press conference, scheduled for 24 April 2012. The initial press release provided limited information; as of 20 April 2012, only a list of major investors and advisors was known. Included in the list were many people notable for their entrepreneurship and interest in space, exploration, and research. Some also had previous involvement in space research. It was speculated that Planetary Resources was "looking for ways to extract raw materials from non-Earth sources," as how it would (as stated in the press release) "add trillions of dollars to the global GDP." From the outset, the dominant assumption was that the company intended to develop asteroid mining operations, with one anonymous source reportedly verifying that claim in advance of the April 24 event. Arkyd Astronautics became a wholly owned subsidiary of Planetary Resources.

In July 2012, Planetary Resources announced an agreement with Virgin Galactic to enable multiple launch opportunities for its series of spacecraft on LauncherOne starting with the Arkyd-100 series of space telescopes.

By January 2013, Planetary Resources had completed a ground test prototype of the Arkyd-100 and released a limited set of details publicly.

In April 2013, Planetary Resources announced that Bechtel Corporation has joined Planetary Resources' group of investors and would be a collaborative partner in helping Planetary Resources achieve its long-term mission of mining asteroids.

In April 2013, the company announced that they planned on launching a CubeSat called "Arkyd-3" (A3) in early 2014, as a testbed manifestation for the Arkyd-100 spacecraft. The purpose of the flight was to test technologies for the first Arkyd-100 spacecraft. In the event, the first A3 was destroyed on October 28, 2014, after an Antares resupply rocket exploded seconds after launch. A second A3 spacecraft named Arkyd 3 Reflight (A3R) was launched and successfully transported to Earth orbit on 17 April 2015 and was deployed from the International Space Station via the NanoRacks CubeSat Deployer on 16 July 2015.

In May 2013, Planetary Resources announced the launch of Kickstarter funding for the ARKYD-100. Their goal was surpassed on 19 June 2013. However, funding for the initial space telescope was not forthcoming. The accompanying Kickstarter campaign was terminated and refunds were promised in May 2016.

In June 2013, Planetary Resources took an undisclosed investment from 3D Systems and intends to make use of its 3D printing technology to manufacture components of the Arkyd spacecraft that Planetary Resources intends to use for finding near-Earth asteroids. By mid-2016, the company had grown to 60 employees, but still has no firm date for the launch of its first Arkyd satellite.

In May 2016, the company announced it had secured US$21.1 million in Series A funding, which it said would be used to deploy and operate a constellation of Earth observation satellites, to be known as Ceres, using ten of their Arkyd-100 satellites. These could have been used both for surveying asteroids and for Earth observation, and were to feature an arc-second resolution camera.

In November 2016, Luxembourg invested €25 million in the company in the form of capital and research and development grants. The company announced the investment would be used for the launch of its first asteroid prospecting mission by 2020. Luxembourg had recently adopted draft legislation giving private operators rights to materials mined in space.

The company's second satellite launch was successfully carried out on 11 January 2018. The Arkyd 6 flight-test satellite was delivered into orbit by the Indian Polar Satellite Launch Vehicle PSLV-C40. Arkyd-6 had originally been announced to launch in late 2015 along with a number of other CubeSats, then to a planned April 2016 launch, and later had plans to launch on a SpaceX vehicle.

In early 2018, the company failed to close a round of funding as planned, forcing layoffs. The company had planned on receiving investment from an unnamed mining company, but the investment was delayed due to budgetary reasons. The company's first asteroid prospecting mission, scheduled to launch in 2020, was delayed indefinitely.

On 31 October 2018, Planetary Resources was acquired by ConsenSys, a blockchain technology company. ConsenSys were to operate its space initiatives out of Planetary Resources' former facility in Redmond, WA.

== Plans ==
Planetary Resources aimed to develop a robotic asteroid mining industry. To achieve this, the company was operating on the basis of a long-term strategic plan.

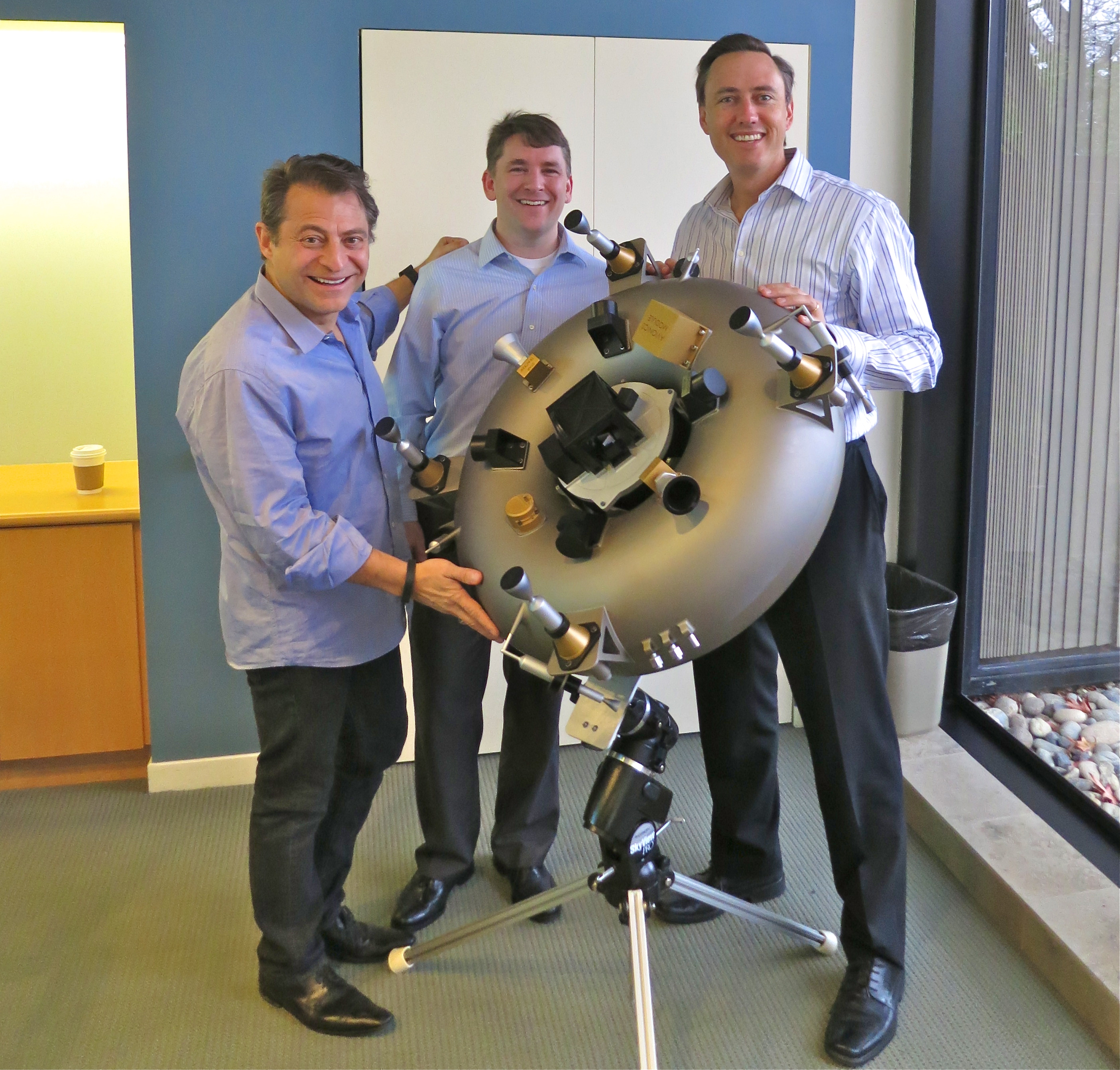
Unveiling the Planetary Resources 3D-Printed Satellite in February 2014 (Arkyd-300 satellite bus configuration). The torus holds the propellant and provides the structure for the satellite. From left: Peter Diamandis, Chris Lewicki, and Steve Jurvetson.

The first stage would have been a survey and analysis, using purpose-built satellites in Earth orbit, to locate the best potential targets among near-Earth asteroids. Several small space telescopes, with various sensing capabilities, were to be launched for this purpose. The company website asserted that their space telescopes would be made available for hire, for private uses. The company also intended to produce satellites for sale. They introduced their first model of space telescope, the Arkyd-100 (that is, as a planned spacecraft; only prototypes of the satellite were ever built, and only two preliminary prototype testing satellites were ever launched).

Later stages of the strategic plan envisioned sending survey probes to selected asteroids in order to map, including deep-scanning, and to conduct sample-and-analysis and/or sample-and-return missions. The company had stated that it could take a decade to finish identifying the best candidates for commercial mining.

Ultimately, their intent was to establish fully automated/robotic asteroid-based mining and processing operations, and the capability to transport the resulting products wherever desired. In addition to the extraction of industrial and precious metals for space-based and terrestrial use, the project envisioned producing water for an orbital propellant depot.

=== Spacecraft models ===
An overview of the first three models of the Arkyd-series satellites were initially released in September 2012.

- Arkyd Series 100 (aka "Leo Space Telescope") — Earth-observer and asteroid-locator satellite. Able to provide "on-demand" Earth imaging to a wider consumer base due to an "unprecedented low price", it would scout for potentially viable asteroids from low Earth orbit (LEO, hence the name). The Arkyd-100 had a mass of 11 to 15 kilograms (24–33 lb). The spacecraft optics system was designed for three uses: faint object observation and detection (as faint as magnitude 19), near-field bright-object analysis, and optical communications.
- Arkyd Series 200 (aka "Interceptor") — asteroid interceptor with a suite of instruments able to collect scientific data on physical characteristics of the target asteroid. Unlike its Earthbound predecessor Leo, Interceptor intended to be designed to intercept asteroids.
- Arkyd Series 300 (aka "Rendezvous Prospector") — with a larger common propulsion system than the Arkyd-200, was designed to be able to accomplish deep-space exploration and prospecting.

=== Arkyd-3 Flight test system ===
Planetary Resources packaged a number of the non-optical satellite technologies of the Arkyd-100—essentially the entire base of the Arkyd-100 satellite model revealed in January 2013, but without the space telescope—into a cost-effective format for early in-space flight testing on a nanosatellite named the Arkyd 3, or A3. The Arkyd-3 testbed satellite was packaged in a 3U CubeSat form-factor of 10×10×30 centimetres (0.33×0.33×0.98 ft). The first attempt to validate and mature the technology met a setback on 28 October 2014, when the first Arkyd-3 test satellite was destroyed during launch in the explosion of the Antares rocket carrying it to the International Space Station (ISS).

A second attempt to launch an Arkyd-3 spacecraft — designated A3R, or Arkyd-3 Reflight (also ARKYD-3R; COSPAR:1998-067GU; SATCAT: 40742) — took place on 14 April 2015 with a flight of SpaceX CRS-6 to the ISS. After spending several months in the ISS, A3R was deployed on orbit on 16 July 2015 to begin flight testing. The test flight was expected to have an approximately 90-day duration. As of January 2016, the company had been silent on the progress of on-orbit testing following deployment from the ISS.

The satellite subsystems tested on A3R the included the avionics, attitude determination and control system (both sensors and actuators), and integrated propulsion system that would enable proximity operations for the Arkyd line of prospectors in the future. A3R reentered the atmosphere on 23 December 2015.

=== Arkyd-6 Flight test system ===
A second flight test unit for Planetary Resources — twice the size of A3R with a 6U form factor — was the Arkyd-6 (A6, also ARKYD 6A; COSPAR: 2018-004V; SATCAT: 43130). It was slated to test attitude control, power, and communication systems as well as a photo-display-and-retransmission system. As of July 2015, A6 was initially planned to launch in late 2015 along with a number of other cubesats. This date had slipped to a planned April 2016 launch. In their May 2016 announcement about securing additional funding, the company indicated they had signed a launch contract for Arkyd-6 with SpaceX. However, SpaceX experienced a flight anomaly in June 2015 and a launch pad anomaly in September 2016, each resulting in multi-month halts to SpaceX launches and a large backlog in the SpaceX launch manifest.

A6 was placed into orbit on 12 January 2018 atop an Indian Polar Satellite Launch Vehicle via launch PSLV-C40.

Arkyd 6 decayed from orbit on February 28, 2024.

== See also ==
- Asteroid mining
- Deep Space Industries
- In-situ resource utilization
- Mining the Sky: Untold Riches from the Asteroids, Comets, and Planets
- NewSpace
- Propellant depot
- Shackleton Energy Company
- Space-based industry
- SpaceDev & their Near Earth Asteroid Prospector
- Space manufacturing
- Space mining
- Space trade
- Space technology
- Inspiration Mars
