= Dragon C108 =

Uncrewed cargo spacecraft built by SpaceX

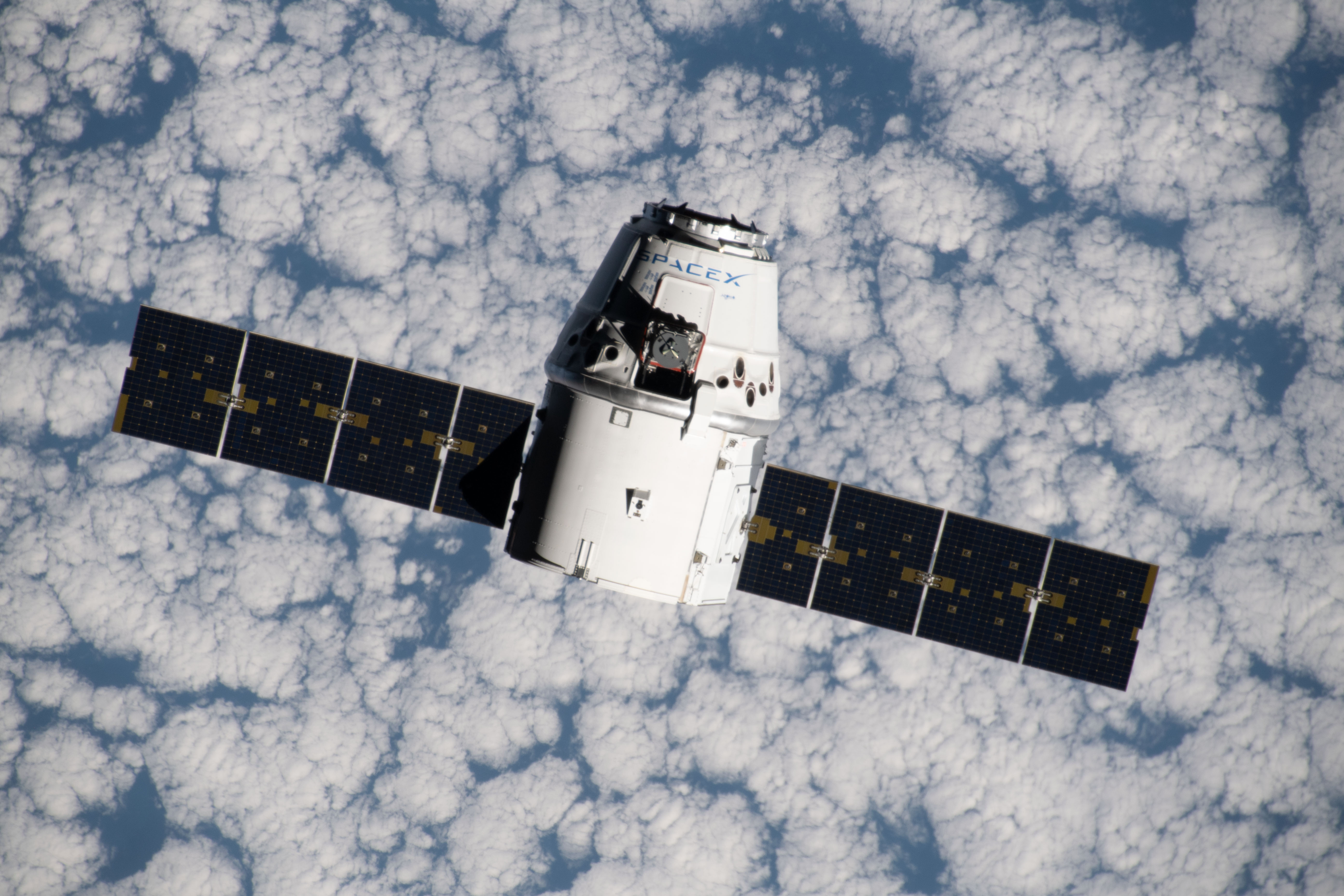
- C108 in flight in July 2019, during CRS-18.
- Type: Cargo space capsule
- Class: SpaceX Dragon
- Owner: SpaceX
- Manufacturer: SpaceX

Specifications
- Dimensions: 6.1 m × 3.7 m (20 ft × 12 ft)
- Dry mass: 4,201 kilograms (9,262 lb)
- Power: Solar arrays
- Rocket: Falcon 9

History
- First flight: 4 April – 21 May 2015; SpaceX CRS-6
- Last flight: 25 July 2019 – 27 August 2019; SpaceX CRS-18
- Flights: 3
- Fate: Retired

SpaceX Dragons

SpaceX Dragon C108 is a Cargo Dragon space capsule built by SpaceX. It is the first Dragon capsule to be flown three times, having its third launch in 2019. C108 was first used on CRS-6, and then used again for the CRS-13 and CRS-18 missions. It was the first capsule to be used a third flight, marking a milestone in SpaceX's drive to reduce space launch costs through reusing hardware.

== History ==
C108 was built as the eighth production Dragon capsule. This new Dragon was launched on the CRS-6 mission to the International Space Station (ISS). It splashed down on May 21, 2015 and was successfully retrieved. To prepare for its second flight, it had its heatshield replaced while the hull, avionics, and Draco thrusters were refurbished. The refurbished Dragon was relaunched in December 15, 2017 for the CRS-13 mission. Following an almost month-long stay, C108 landed on January 13, 2018. After undergoing another refurbishment, C108 was launched again in July 2019 for the CRS-18 mission. It landed for the final time on August 27, 2019 and was retired.

== Flights ==
C108 flights
Flight #	Mission	Launch date (UTC)	Landing date (UTC)	Liftoff	Notes
1	NASA CRS-6	14 April 2015, 20:10:41	21 May 2015, 16:42		
2	NASA CRS-13	15 December 2017, 15:36:09	13 January 2018, 15:37		
3	NASA CRS-18	25 July 2019, 22:01	27 August 2019, 20:20		First third flight of a Dragon Capsule
