= USA-585 =

GPS III satellite

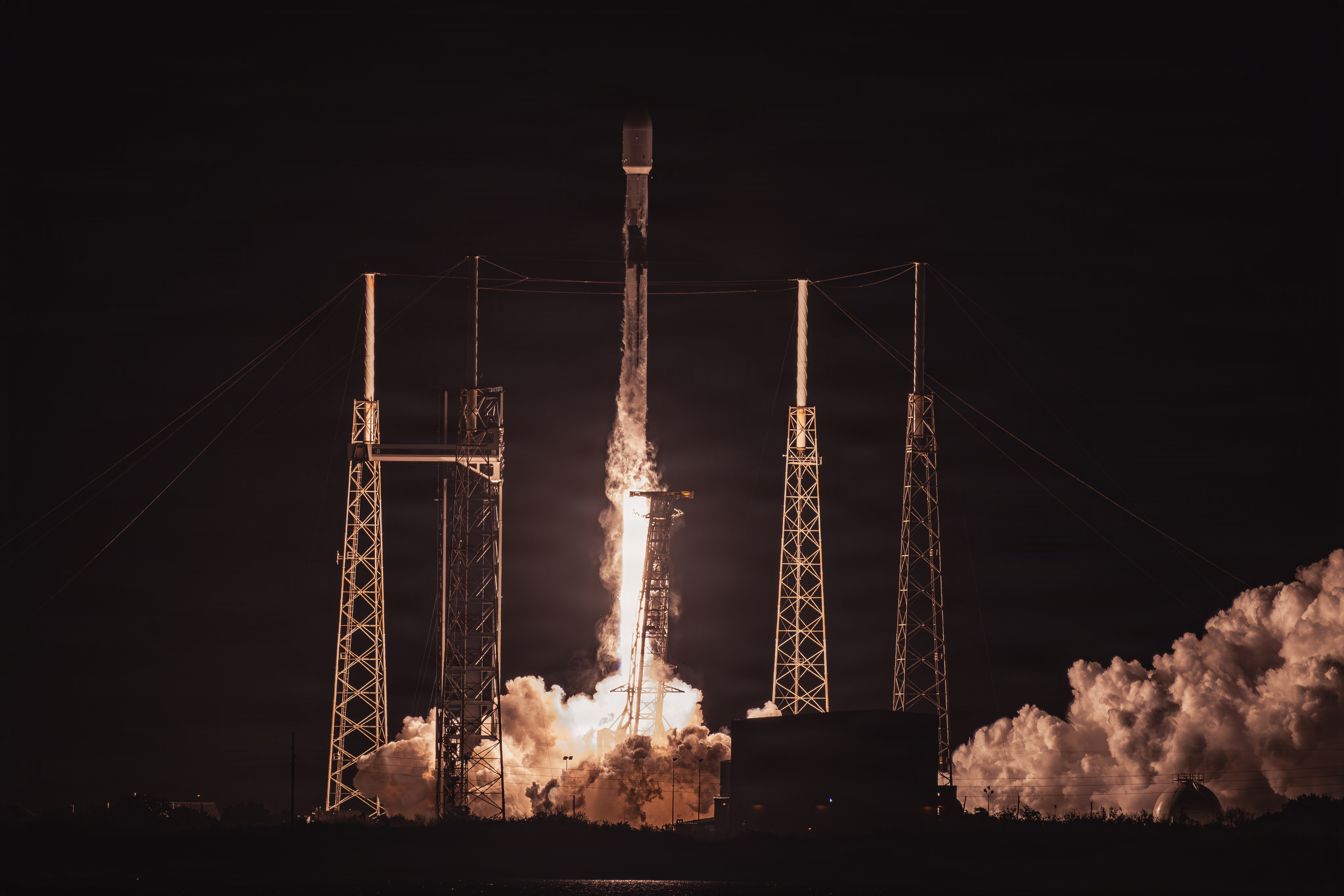
- Launch of USA-585
- Names: Navstar 86; GPS-III SV10; Hedy Lamarr; USA-585
- Mission type: Navigation
- Operator: USSF
- COSPAR ID: 2026-087A
- SATCAT no.: 68791

Spacecraft properties
- Spacecraft: GPS-III SV10
- Spacecraft type: GPS Block III
- Bus: A2100M
- Manufacturer: Lockheed Martin

Start of mission
- Launch date: 21 April 2026, 06:53 UTC
- Rocket: Falcon 9 Block 5
- Launch site: Cape Canaveral, SLC-40
- Contractor: SpaceX

Orbital parameters
- Reference system: Geocentric orbit
- Regime: Medium Earth orbit (Semi-synchronous orbit)

USA-585 (also known as GPS III-10, NAVSTAR 86 and Hedy Lamarr) is a United States navigation satellite which forms part of the Global Positioning System. It was launched by Falcon 9 on 21 April 2026. It is the 10th and final satellite in the GPS III series.

== Satellite ==
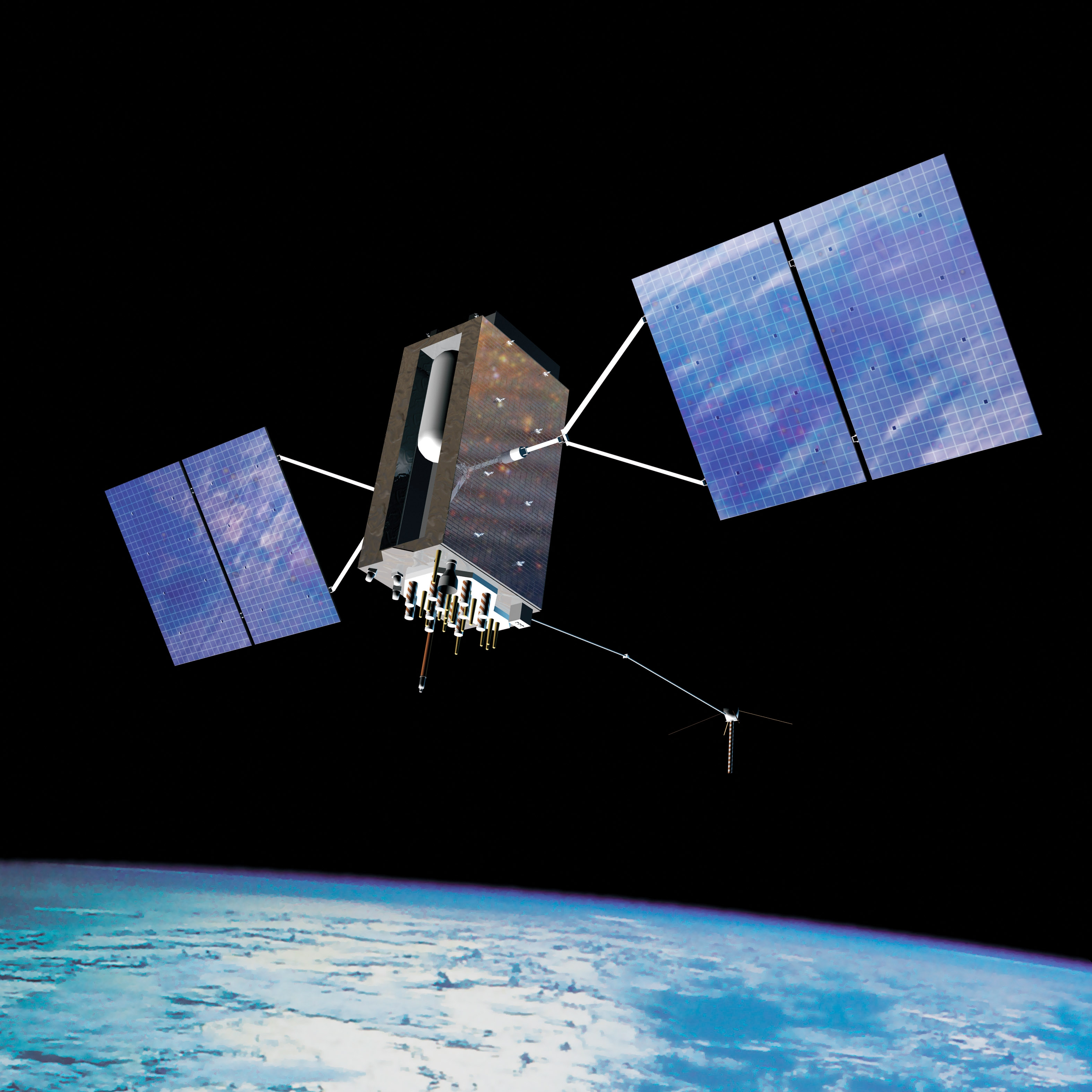
Artist's rendering of GPS-III satellite in orbit

The satellite was named in 2021 after Hedy Lamarr, the inventor of the frequency-hopping technology. Construction of the satellite was completed in February 2023. The satellite includes a Tesat-Spacecom SCOT80 optical communications terminal, intended to perform the first laser communications test from a GPS satellite at medium Earth orbit.

== Launch ==
The satellite's launch was originally awarded to SpaceX but it was later switched to ULA for a mission exchange to launch GPS III-07 Sally Ride on Falcon 9 and later in March 2026 it was reassigned to SpaceX because of delays due to recent Vulcan solid rocket booster issues during the launch of the USSF-87 mission. In exchange, ULA was awarded with USSF-70 mission originally planned for launch on Falcon Heavy. The launch mission was named GPS III-8.
