= GPS Block III =

Current generation of GPS satellites

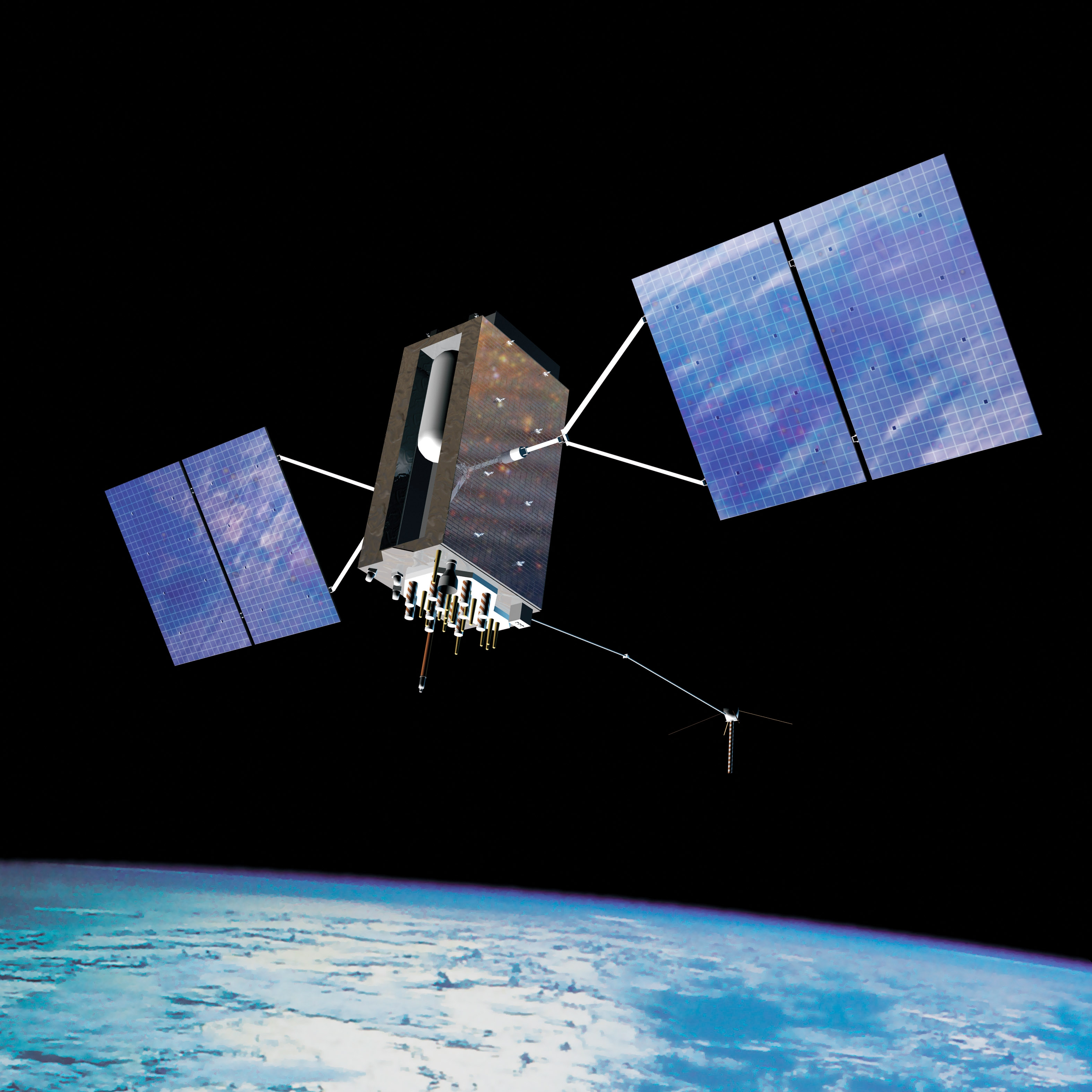
- Artist's impression of a GPS Block III satellite in orbit
- Manufacturer: Lockheed Martin
- Country of origin: United States
- Operator: US Space Force
- Applications: Navigation satellite

Specifications
- Bus: Lockheed Martin A2100M
- Launch mass: 3,681 kg (8,115 lb)
- Dry mass: 2,161 kg (4,764 lb)
- Power: 4480 watts (end of life)
- Batteries: Nickel–hydrogen battery
- Regime: Semi-synchronous Medium Earth orbit
- Design life: 15 years (planned)

Production
- Status: Production complete
- Built: 10
- Launched: 10
- Operational: 9
- Maiden launch: 23 December 2018
- Last launch: 21 April 2026

Related spacecraft
- Derived from: GPS Block IIF

GPS Block III (previously Block IIIA) consists of the first ten GPS III satellites, which are used to keep the Navstar Global Positioning System operational. Lockheed Martin designed, developed and manufactured the GPS III Non-Flight Satellite Testbed (GNST) and all ten Block III satellites. The first satellite in the series was launched in December 2018.

== History ==
The United States' Global Positioning System (GPS) reached Full Operational Capability on 17 July 1995, completing its original design goals. Advances in technology and new demands on the existing system led to the effort to modernize the GPS system. In 2000, the U.S. Congress authorized the effort, referred to as GPS III.

The project involves new ground stations and new satellites, with additional navigation signals for both civilian and military users, and aims to improve the accuracy and availability for all users.

Lockheed Martin was awarded the contract to deliver GPS III satellites on 15 May 2008, beating out Boeing in the competition for the contract. Raytheon was awarded the Next Generation GPS Operational Control System (OCX) contract on 25 February 2010.

The first satellite in the series was projected to launch in 2014, but significant delays pushed the launch to December 2018. The tenth and final launch was on 21 April 2026, taking less than 8 years to complete.

While continuing the conventional satellite naming scheme in official usage, the United States Space Force's Space and Missile Systems Center also began unofficially naming each Block III satellite after a famous explorer, navigator, or an aviation/space-related leader of note. The 10 GPS III Space Vehicles (SVs) have the following names: SV01 (SVN-74): Vespucci (Amerigo); SV02 (SVN-75): Magellan (Ferdinand); SV03 (SVN-76): Henson (Matthew), Admiral Peary’s navigator: possibly the first person to be at the geographic North Pole; SV04 (SVN-77): Sacagawea; SV05 (SVN-78): Armstrong (Neil); SV06 (SVN-79): Earhart (Amelia); SV07 (SVN-80): Sally (Ride); SV08 (SVN-81): Katherine Johnson, NASA mathematician; SV09 (SVN-82): Onizuka (Ellison); SV10 (SVN-83): Lamar (Heddy). The "SVN" number was created by the Air Force (now Space Force) to note for history the GPS satellites in the GPS constellation in a manner that is in the order that they were acquired by the Government (not launched).

== Development ==
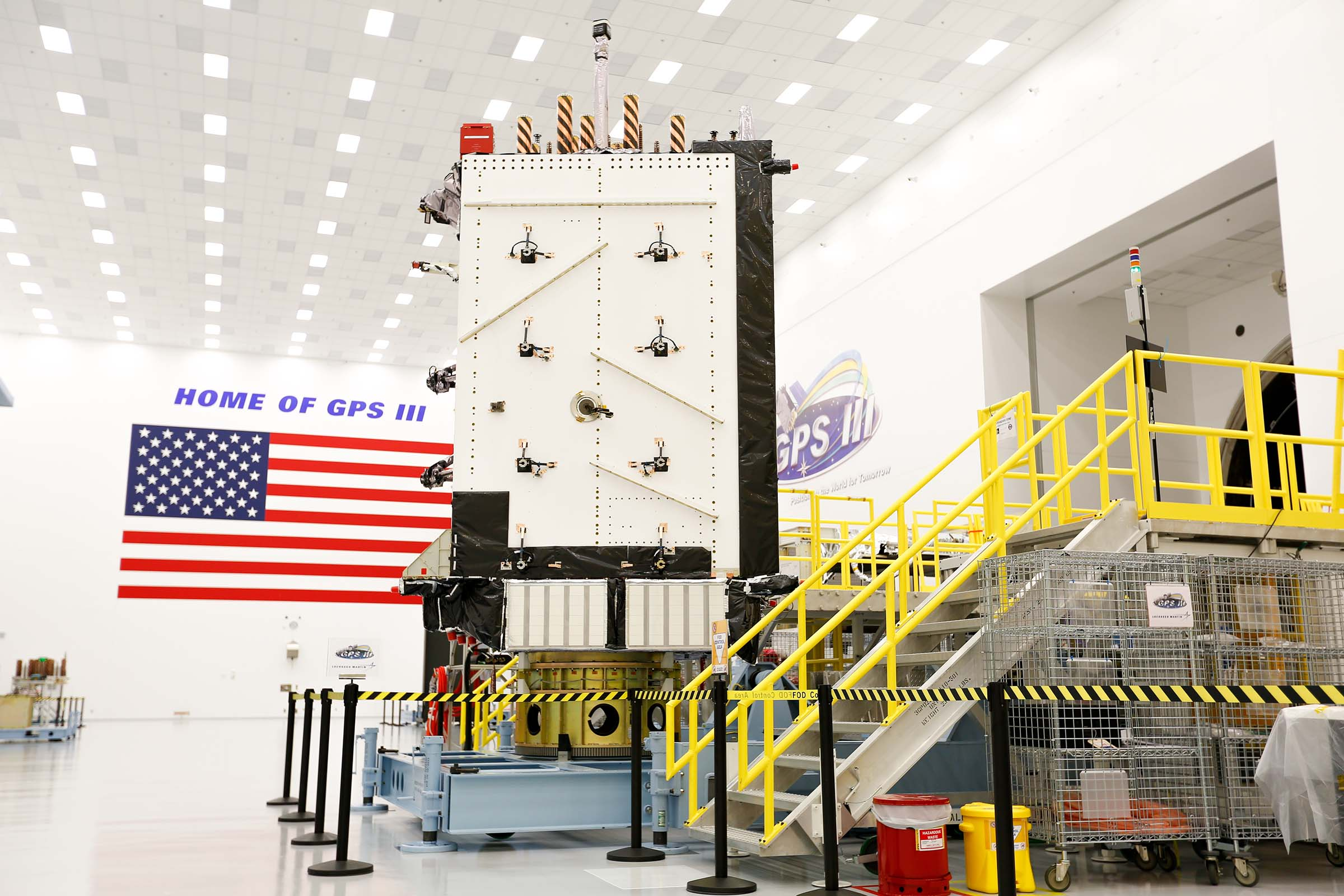
GPS III SV-01 in Lockheed Martin's Colorado GPS III Processing facility after successful core mate.

Block III satellites use Lockheed Martin's A2100M satellite bus structure. The propellant and pressurant tanks are manufactured by Orbital ATK from lightweight, high-strength composite materials. Each satellite will carry an antenna with 8 JIB (Jack-in-the-Box type) deployable antenna elements, all designed and manufactured by Northrop Grumman Astro Aerospace

Already delayed significantly beyond the first satellite's planned 2014 launch, on 27 April 2016, SpaceX, in Hawthorne, California, was awarded a US$82.7 million firm-fixed-price contract for launch services to deliver a GPS III satellite to its intended orbit. The contract included launch vehicle production, mission integration, and launch operations for a GPS III mission, to be performed in Hawthorne, California; Cape Canaveral Air Force Station, Florida; and McGregor, Texas. In December 2016, the Director of the U.S. Air Force's Global Positioning Systems Directorate announced the first satellite would launch in the spring of 2018. In March 2017, the U.S. General Accounting Office stated "Technical issues with both the GPS III satellite and the OCX Block 0 launch control and checkout system have combined to place the planned March 2018 launch date for the first GPS III satellite at risk". The delays were caused by a number of factors, primarily due to issues found in the navigation payload. Further launch date slippages were caused by the need for additional testing and validation of a SpaceX Falcon 9 rocket which ultimately launched the satellite on 23 December 2018. On 22 August 2019, the second GPS III satellite was launched aboard a Delta IV rocket.

On 21 September 2016, the U.S. Air Force exercised a US$395 million contract option with Lockheed Martin for the ninth and tenth Block III space vehicles, expected to be available for launch by 2022.

== Launch history ==
All 10 GPS Block III satellites have been launched. 9 are currently operational, with 1 undergoing post launch commissioning.

Satellite	SVN	Launch date (UTC)	Rocket	Launch site	Status	Ref.
USA-289; GPS III-01; Vespucci	74	23 December 2018; 13:51	Falcon 9 Block 5	Cape Canaveral, SLC‑40	In service	
USA-293; GPS III-02; Magellan	75	22 August 2019; 13:06	Delta IV M+ (4,2)	Cape Canaveral, SLC‑37B	In service	
USA-304; GPS III-03; Matthew Henson	76	30 June 2020; 20:10	Falcon 9 Block 5	Cape Canaveral, SLC‑40	In service	
USA-309; GPS III-04; Sacagawea	77	5 November 2020; 23:24	Falcon 9 Block 5	Cape Canaveral, SLC‑40	In service	
USA-319; GPS III-05; Neil Armstrong	78	17 June 2021; 16:09	Falcon 9 Block 5	Cape Canaveral, SLC‑40	In service	
USA-343; GPS III-06; Amelia Earhart	79	18 January 2023; 12:24	Falcon 9 Block 5	Cape Canaveral, SLC‑40	In service	
USA-440; GPS III-07; Sally Ride	80	17 December 2024; 00:52	Falcon 9 Block 5	Cape Canaveral, SLC‑40	In service	
USA-545; GPS III-08; Katherine Johnson	81	30 May 2025; 17:37	Falcon 9 Block 5	Cape Canaveral, SLC‑40	In service	
USA-581; GPS III-09; Ellison Onizuka	82	28 Jan 2026; 04:53	Falcon 9 Block 5	Cape Canaveral, SLC‑40	In service	
USA-585; GPS III-10; Hedy Lamarr	83	21 April 2026; 06:53	Falcon 9 Block 5	Cape Canaveral, SLC‑40	In service	

== New navigation signals ==
=== Civilian L2 (L2C) ===
One of the first announcements was the addition of a new civilian-use signal to be transmitted on a frequency other than the L1 frequency used for the existing GPS Coarse Acquisition (C/A) signal. Ultimately, this became known as the L2C signal because it is broadcast on the L2 frequency (1227.6 MHz). It can be transmitted by all block IIR-M and later design satellites. The original plan stated that until the new OCX (Block 1) system is in place, the signal would consist of a default message ("Type 0") that contains no navigational data. OCX Block 1 with the L2C navigation data was scheduled to enter service in February 2016, but was delayed until 2022 or later.

As a result of OCX delays, the L2C signal was decoupled from the OCX deployment schedule. All satellites capable of transmitting the L2C signal (all GPS satellites launched since 2005) began broadcasting pre-operational civil navigation (CNAV) messages in April 2014, and in December 2014 the U.S. Air Force started transmitting CNAV uploads on a daily basis. As of October 2017, L2C was being broadcast from 19 satellites; by June 2022 there were 24 satellites broadcasting this signal. The L2C signal remains in pre-operational status with 25 broadcasting space vehicles in December 2025. The L2C signal is tasked with providing improved accuracy of navigation, providing an easy-to-track signal, and acting as a redundant signal in case of localized interference.

The immediate effect of having two civilian frequencies being transmitted from one satellite is the ability to directly measure, and therefore remove, the ionospheric delay error for that satellite. Without such a measurement, a GPS receiver must use a generic model or receive ionospheric corrections from another source (such as a Satellite Based Augmentation System). Advances in technology for the GPS satellites and the GPS receivers have made ionospheric delay the largest source of error in the C/A signal. A receiver capable of performing this measurement is referred to as a dual frequency receiver. Its technical characteristics are:

- L2C contains two distinct PRN sequences:
  - CM (for Civilian Moderate length code) is 10,230 bits in length, repeating every 20 milliseconds.
  - CL (for Civilian Long length code) is 767,250 bits, repeating every 1,500 milliseconds (i.e., every 1.5 second).
  - Each signal is transmitted at 511,500 bits per second (bit/s); however, they are multiplexed to form a 1,023,000 bit/s signal.
- CM is modulated with a 25 bit/s navigation message with forward error correction, whereas CL contains no additional modulated data.
- The long, non-data CL sequence provides for approximately 24 dB greater correlation protection (~250 times stronger) than L1 C/A.
- L2C signal characteristics provide 2.7 dB greater data recovery and 0.7 dB greater carrier tracking than L1 C/A.
- The L2C signals' transmission power is 2.3 dB weaker than the L1 C/A signal.
- In a single frequency application, L2C has 65% more ionospheric error than L1.

It is defined in IS-GPS-200.

=== Military (M-code) ===
A major component of the modernization process, a new military signal called M-code was designed to further improve the anti-jamming and secure access of the military GPS signals. The M-code is transmitted in the same L1 and L2 frequencies already in use by the previous military code, the P(Y) code. The new signal is shaped to place most of its energy at the edges (away from the existing P(Y) and C/A carriers). Unlike the P(Y) code, the M-code is designed to be autonomous, meaning that users can calculate their positions using only the M-code signal. P(Y) code receivers must typically first lock onto the C/A code and then transfer to lock onto the P(Y) code.

In a major departure from previous GPS designs, the M-code is intended to be broadcast from a high-gain directional antenna, in addition to a wide angle (full Earth) antenna. The directional antenna's signal, termed a spot beam, is intended to be aimed at a specific region (i.e., several hundred kilometers in diameter) and increase the local signal strength by 20 dB (10× voltage field strength, 100× power). A side effect of having two antennas is that, for receivers inside the spot beam, the GPS satellite will appear as two GPS signals occupying the same position.

While the full-Earth M-code signal is available on the Block IIR-M satellites, the spot beam antennas will not be available until the Block III satellites are deployed. Like the other new GPS signals, M-code is dependent on OCX—specifically Block 2—which was scheduled to enter service in October 2016, but which was delayed until 2022, and that initial date did not reflect the two year first satellite launch delays expected by the GAO.

Other M-code characteristics are:

- Satellites will transmit two distinct signals from two antennas: one for whole Earth coverage, one in a spot beam.
- Binary offset carrier modulation.
- Occupies 24 MHz of bandwidth.
- It uses a new MNAV navigational message, which is packetized instead of framed, allowing for flexible data payloads.
- There are four effective data channels; different data can be sent on each frequency and on each antenna.
- It can include FEC and error detection.
- The spot beam is ~20 dB more powerful than the whole Earth coverage beam.
- M-code signal at Earth's surface: –158 dBW for whole Earth antenna, –138 dBW for spot beam antennas.

=== Safety of Life (L5) ===
Safety of Life is a civilian-use signal, broadcast on the L5 frequency (1176.45 MHz). In 2009, a WAAS satellite sent the initial L5 signal test transmissions. SVN-62, the first GPS block IIF satellite, continuously broadcast the L5 signal starting on 28 June 2010.

As a result of schedule delays to the GPS III control segment, the L5 signal was decoupled from the OCX deployment schedule. All satellites capable of transmitting the L5 signal (all GPS satellites launched since May 2010) began broadcasting pre-operational civil navigation (CNAV) messages in April 2014, and in December 2014 the Air Force started transmitting CNAV uploads on a daily basis. The L5 signal will be considered fully operational once at least 24 space vehicles are broadcasting the signal, currently projected to happen in 2027.

As of 10 July 2023, L5 is being broadcast from 17 satellites, after the removal of the block IIF, SVN-63.

- Improves signal structure for enhanced performance.
- Higher transmission power than L1 or L2C signal (~3 dB, or twice as powerful).
- Wider bandwidth, yielding a 10-times processing gain.
- Longer spreading codes (10 times longer than used on the C/A code).
- Located in the Aeronautical Radionavigation Services band, a frequency band that is available worldwide.

WRC-2000 added a space signal component to this aeronautical band so the aviation community can manage interference to L5 more effectively than L2. It is defined in IS-GPS-705.

=== New civilian L1 (L1C) ===
L1C is a civilian-use signal, to be broadcast on the same L1 frequency (1575.42 MHz) that contains the C/A signal used by all current GPS users.

L1C broadcasting started when GPS III Control Segment (OCX) Block 1 becomes operational, scheduled for 2022. The L1C signal will reach full operational status when being broadcast from at least 24 GPS Block III satellites, projected for the late 2020s.

- Implementation will provide C/A code to ensure backward compatibility.
- Assured of 1.5 dB increase in minimum C/A code power to mitigate any noise floor increase.
- Non-data signal component contains a pilot carrier to improve tracking.
- Enables greater civil interoperability with Galileo L1.

It is defined in IS-GPS-800.

== Improvements ==
Increased signal power at the Earth's surface:

- M-code: −158 dBW / −138 dBW.
- L1 and L2: −157 dBW for the C/A code signal and −160 dBW for the P(Y) code signal.
- L5 will be −154 dBW.

Researchers from The Aerospace Corporation confirmed that the most efficient means to generate the high-power M-code signal would entail a departure from full-Earth coverage, characteristic of all the user downlink signals up until that point. Instead, a high-gain antenna would be used to produce a directional spot beam several hundred kilometers in diameter. Originally, this proposal was considered as a retrofit to the planned Block IIF satellites. Upon closer inspection, program managers realized that the addition of a large deployable antenna, combined with the changes that would be needed in the operational control segment, presented too great a challenge for the then existing system design.

- NASA has requested that Block III satellites carry laser retro-reflectors. This allows tracking the orbits of the satellites independent of the radio signals, which allows satellite clock errors to be disentangled from ephemeris errors. This, a standard feature of GLONASS, will be included in the Galileo positioning system, and was included as an experiment on two older GPS satellites (satellites 35 and 36). They will be included on Block IIIF satellites. These were later fitted on SVs 09 and 10.
- The USAF is working with NASA to add a Distress Alerting Satellite System (DASS) payload to the second increment of GPS III satellites as part of the MEOSAR search and rescue system.

SV10 will carry an optical communications terminal developed by German aerospace manufacturer Tesat-Spacecom. If successful, this technology could enhance the precision and efficiency of the navigation system used by billions worldwide.

== Control segment ==
The GPS Operational Control Segment (OCS), consisting of a worldwide network of satellite operations centers, ground antennas and monitoring stations, provides Command and Control (C2) capabilities for GPS Block II satellites. The latest update to the GPS OCS, Architectural Evolution Plan 7.5, was operationally accepted in 2019.

=== Next-Generation operational control segment (OCX) ===
In 2010, the United States Air Force announced plans to develop a modern control segment, a critical part of the GPS modernization initiative. OCS will continue to serve as the ground control system of record until the new system, Next Generation GPS Operational Control System (OCX), is fully developed and functional.

OCX features are being delivered to the United States Air Force in three separate phases, known as "blocks". The OCX blocks are numbered zero through two. With each block delivered, OCX gains additional functionality.

In June 2016, the U.S. Air Force formally notified Congress the OCX program's projected program costs had risen above US$4.25 billion, thus exceeding baseline cost estimates of US$3.4 billion by 25%, also known as a critical Nunn-McCurdy breach. Factors leading to the breach include "inadequate systems engineering at program inception", and "the complexity of cybersecurity requirements on OCX". In October 2016, the Department of Defense formally certified the program, a necessary step to allow development to continue after a critical breach.

In July 2021, all OCX monitor station installations had been completed. OCX monitoring stations are expected to transition to operations in "early 2023," and the U.S. Space Force hopes to complete operational acceptance for all of OCX in 2027.

On April 17, 2026, the program was officially canceled by the Pentagon defense acquisition executive. The reason given was that the program's problems had "proved insurmountable", and that the projected cost had grown to nearly the cost of the fleet of GPS satellites themselves, at nearly $8 billion. Space Force will instead retool the legacy control system.

==== OCX Block 0 (launch and checkout for Block III) ====
OCX Block 0 provides the minimum subset of full OCX capabilities necessary to support launch and early on-orbit spacecraft bus checkout on GPS III space vehicles.

Block 0 completed two cybersecurity testing events in April and May 2018 with no new vulnerabilities found.

In June 2018, Block 0 had its third successful integrated launch rehearsal with GPS III.

The U.S. Air Force accepted the delivery of OCX Block 0 in November 2017, and is used it to prepare for the first GPS launch in December 2018.

As of May 2022, OCX Block 0 has successfully supported the launch and checkout of GPS III SV 01–05.

==== OCX Block 1 (civilian GPS III features) ====
OCX Block 1 is an upgrade to OCX Block 0, at which time the OCX system achieves Initial Operating Capability (IOC). Once Block 1 is deployed, OCX will for the first time be able to command and control both Block II and Block III GPS satellites, as well as support the ability to begin broadcasting the civilian L1C signal.

In November 2016, the GAO reported that OCX Block 1 had become the primary cause for delay in activating the GPS III PNT mission.

Block 1 completed the final iteration of Critical Design Review (CDR) in September 2018. Software development on Block 1 is scheduled to complete in 2019, after which the Block 1 software will undergo 2.5 years of system testing.

==== OCX Block 2 (military GPS III features, civilian signal monitoring) ====
OCX Block 2 upgrades OCX with the advanced M-code features for military users and the ability to monitor performance of the civilian signals. In March 2017, the contractor rephased its OCX delivery schedule so that Block 2 will now be delivered to the Air Force concurrently with Block 1. In July 2017, an additional nine months delay to the schedule was announced. According to the July 2017 program schedule, OCX will be delivered to the U.S. Air Force in April 2022. OCX Blocks 1 & 2 were finally delivered to the U.S. Space Force on July 1, 2025.

==== OCX Block 3F (launch and checkout for Block IIIF) ====
OCX Block 3F upgrades OCX with the ability to perform Launch & Checkout for Block IIIF satellites. Block IIIF satellites are expected to start launching in 2026.

The OCX Block 3F contract, valued at $228 million, was awarded to Raytheon Intelligence and Space on 30 April 2021. As of September 2024, it is scheduled for delivery to the U.S. Space Force in 2026.

=== Contingency operations ===
GPS III Contingency Operations ("COps") is an update to the GPS Operational Control Segment, allowing OCS to provide Block IIF Position, Navigation, and Timing (PNT) features from GPS III satellites. The Contingency Operations effort enables GPS III satellites to participate in the GPS constellation, albeit in a limited fashion, without having to wait until OCX Block 1 becomes operational (scheduled for 2022).

The United States Space Force awarded the US$96 million Contingency Operations contract in February 2016. Contingency Ops was operationally accepted by in April 2020.

=== Deployment schedule ===
On April 17, 2026, the OCX program was officially canceled by the Pentagon defense acquisition executive, and a retooled OCS will be used. Circa 2025, the schedule was:

Date	Deployment	Space Vehicles			Remarks
Date	Deployment	Command & Control		Satellites Delivering Navigation Data	Remarks
Date	Deployment	OCS	OCX	Satellites Delivering Navigation Data	Remarks
December 2018	OCX Block 0	Block II	Block III (Launch and Checkout only)	Block II	OCS and OCX operate in parallel
April 2020	Contingency Operations	Block II	Block III (Launch and Checkout only)	Block II and Block III	OCS and OCX operate in parallel
December 2025	OCX Block 1 and OCX Block 2		Block II & Block III	Block II and Block III	OCS no longer used, L1C transmissions begin, full GPS III functionality achieved.
Late 2027	OCX Block 3F		Block II & Block III (complete), Block IIIF (Launch and Checkout only)	Block II and Block III	

== See also ==
- GPS Block IIIF
- GPS signals
- GPS satellite blocks
- List of GPS satellites
- Michibiki – New Japanese designed and launched satellites designed to enhance GPS within Japan.
