= USA-440 =

GPS III satellite

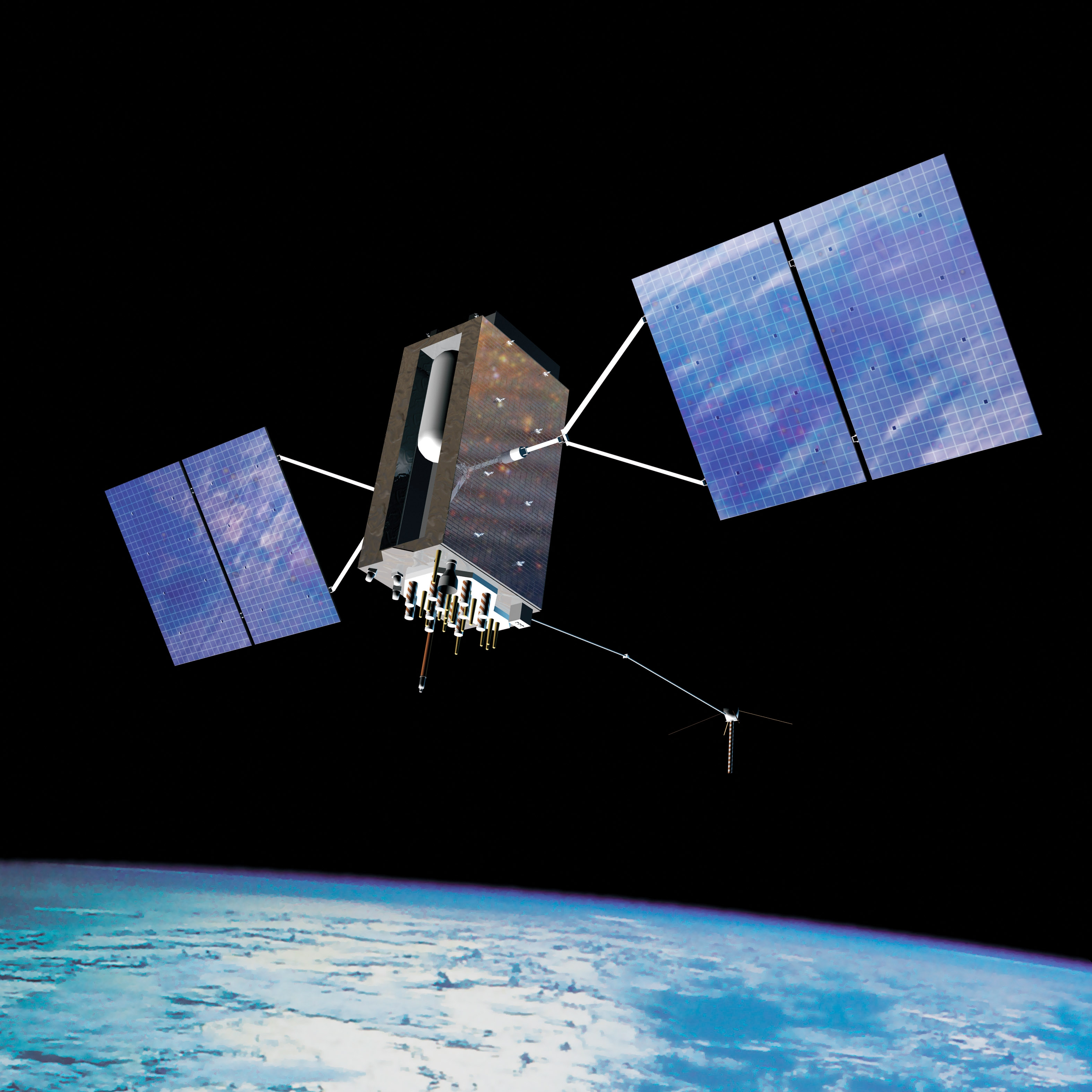
- Artist's rendering of a GPS-III satellite in orbit
- Names: Navstar 83; GPS-III SV07; Sally Ride
- Mission type: Navigation
- Operator: USSF
- COSPAR ID: 2024-242A
- SATCAT no.: 62339
- Mission duration: 15 years (planned)

Spacecraft properties
- Spacecraft: GPS-III SV07
- Spacecraft type: GPS Block III
- Bus: A2100M
- Manufacturer: Lockheed Martin
- Launch mass: 4352 kg
- Power: 70/28 Volts

Start of mission
- Launch date: 17 December 2024
- Rocket: Falcon 9 Block 5 (F9-410)
- Launch site: Cape Canaveral, SLC-40
- Contractor: SpaceX

Orbital parameters
- Reference system: Geocentric orbit
- Regime: Medium Earth orbit (Semi-synchronous orbit)
- Period: 718.0 minutes

USA-440, also known as GPS-III SV07, NAVSTAR 83, RRT-1 or Sally Ride, is a United States navigation satellite which forms part of the Global Positioning System.

The satellite is named after Sally Ride.

The RRT-1 name refers to the Rapid Response Trailblazer program in which the satellite was launched on an accelerated timeline.

== Satellite ==
SV07 is the seventh GPS Block III satellite to launch.

The spacecraft is built on the Lockheed Martin A2100 satellite bus, and weighs in at 4,331 kg (9,548 lb).

Space vehicle manufacturing contract awarded February 2013. It was in assembly in December 2018. Declared "Available for Launch" on 20 May 2021.

== Launch ==
The satellite's launch was originally awarded to ULA but it was later switched to SpaceX because of delays in ULA's Vulcan rocket certification. In exchange, ULA was awarded another GPS launch originally planned for Falcon Heavy.

USA-440 was launched by SpaceX on 17 December 2024 at 00:52pm UTC, atop a Falcon 9 rocket.

The launch took place from SLC-40 at Cape Canaveral Space Force Station.
