= Cygnus NG-25 =

2026 cargo mission to the ISS

NG-25
- Names: CRS NG-25
- Mission type: ISS resupply
- Operator: Northrop Grumman

Spacecraft properties
- Spacecraft: S.S. James "Jim" Lovell
- Spacecraft type: Cygnus XL
- Manufacturer: Northrop Grumman; Thales Alenia Space

Start of mission
- Launch date: November 29, 2026, 15:47 UTC (10:47 am EST) (planned)
- Rocket: Falcon 9 Block 5
- Launch site: Cape Canaveral, SLC‑40
- Contractor: SpaceX

End of mission
- Disposal: Deorbiting
- Decay date: May 2027 (planned)

Orbital parameters
- Reference system: Geocentric orbit
- Regime: Low Earth orbit
- Inclination: 51.66°

Berthing at ISS
- Berthing port: Unity nadir
- RMS capture: December 1, 2026, 19:35 UTC (planned)
- Berthing date: December 1, 2026 (planned)
- Unberthing date: May 2027 (planned)
- RMS release: May 2027 (planned)

Cargo
- Mass: 5,000 kg (≈11,000 lb)
- Mission patch Commercial Resupply Services Cygnus flights

NG-25 is a planned cargo resupply mission to the International Space Station (ISS) under NASA's Commercial Resupply Services (CRS) contract. Operated by Northrop Grumman, the flight is currently slated to launch on November 29, 2026 aboard a Falcon 9 Block 5 rocket.

The spacecraft is named S.S. James "Jim" Lovell. Following NG-23, the mission is the third to use the Cygnus XL spacecraft configuration, featuring a pressurized cargo module measuring 7.89 meters (25.9 ft) in length, with a payload capacity of 5,000 kilograms (11,000 lb), an increase of 19.5%, and a pressurized cargo volume of 36 cubic metres (1,300 cu ft), an increase of 15.5%.

== See also ==
- Uncrewed spaceflights to the International Space Station
