= USA-289 =

GPS III satellite

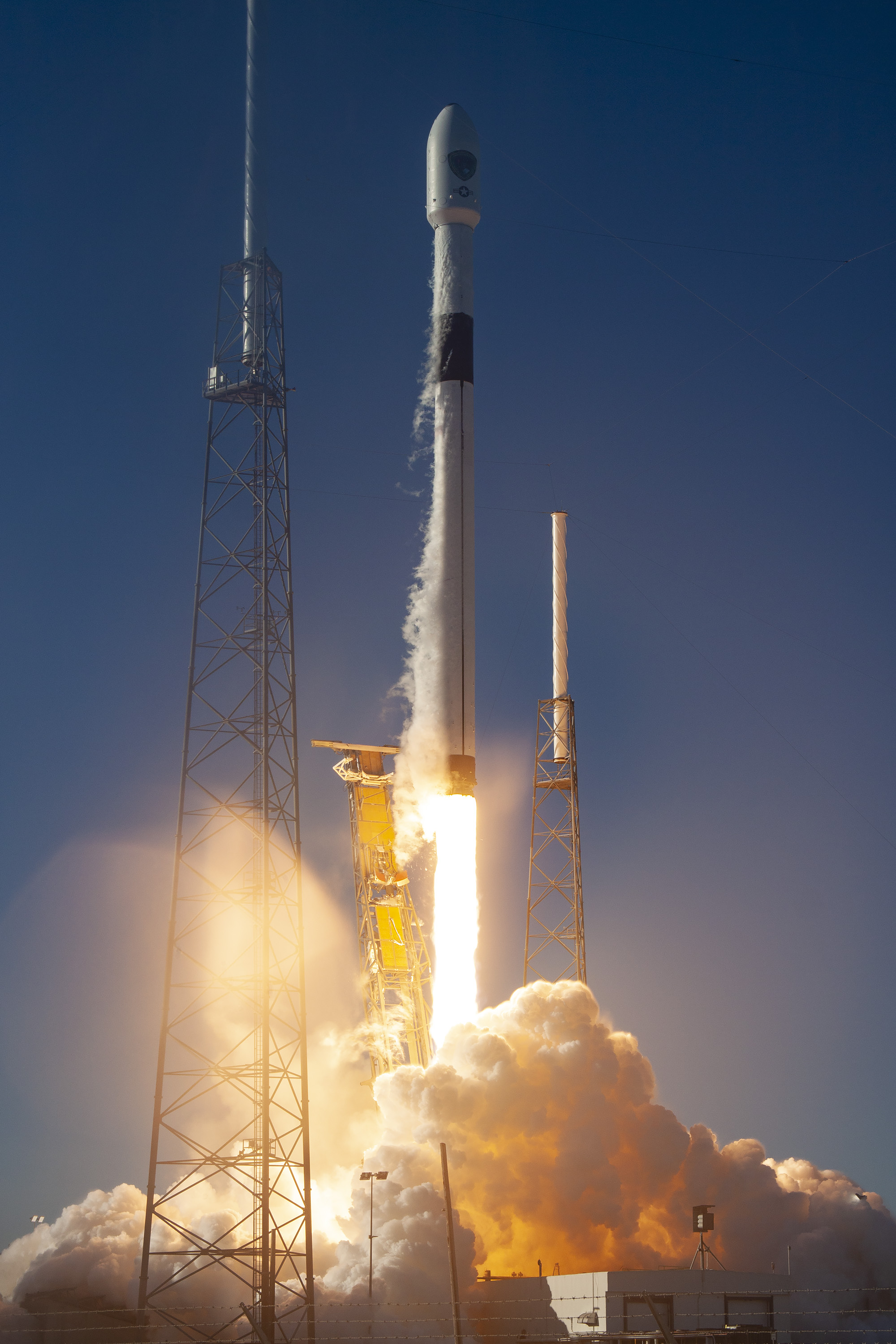
- Launch of GPS-III 01
- Names: Navstar 77; GPS-III SV01; Vespucci
- Mission type: Navigation
- Operator: USAF
- COSPAR ID: 2018-109A
- SATCAT no.: 43873
- Mission duration: 15 years (planned)

Spacecraft properties
- Spacecraft: GPS-III SV01
- Spacecraft type: GPS Block III
- Bus: A2100M
- Manufacturer: Lockheed Martin
- Launch mass: 4400 kg

Start of mission
- Launch date: 23 December 2018, 13:51 UTC
- Rocket: Falcon 9 Block 5 (F9-066)
- Launch site: Cape Canaveral, SLC-40
- Contractor: SpaceX

Orbital parameters
- Reference system: Geocentric orbit
- Regime: Medium Earth orbit (Semi-synchronous orbit)
- Perigee altitude: 20,118 km (12,501 mi)
- Apogee altitude: 20,196 km (12,549 mi)
- Inclination: 55.00°
- Period: 716.7 minutes

USA-289, also known as GPS-III SV01 or Vespucci, is a United States navigation satellite which forms part of the Global Positioning System. It was the first GPS Block III satellite to be launched.

== Satellite ==
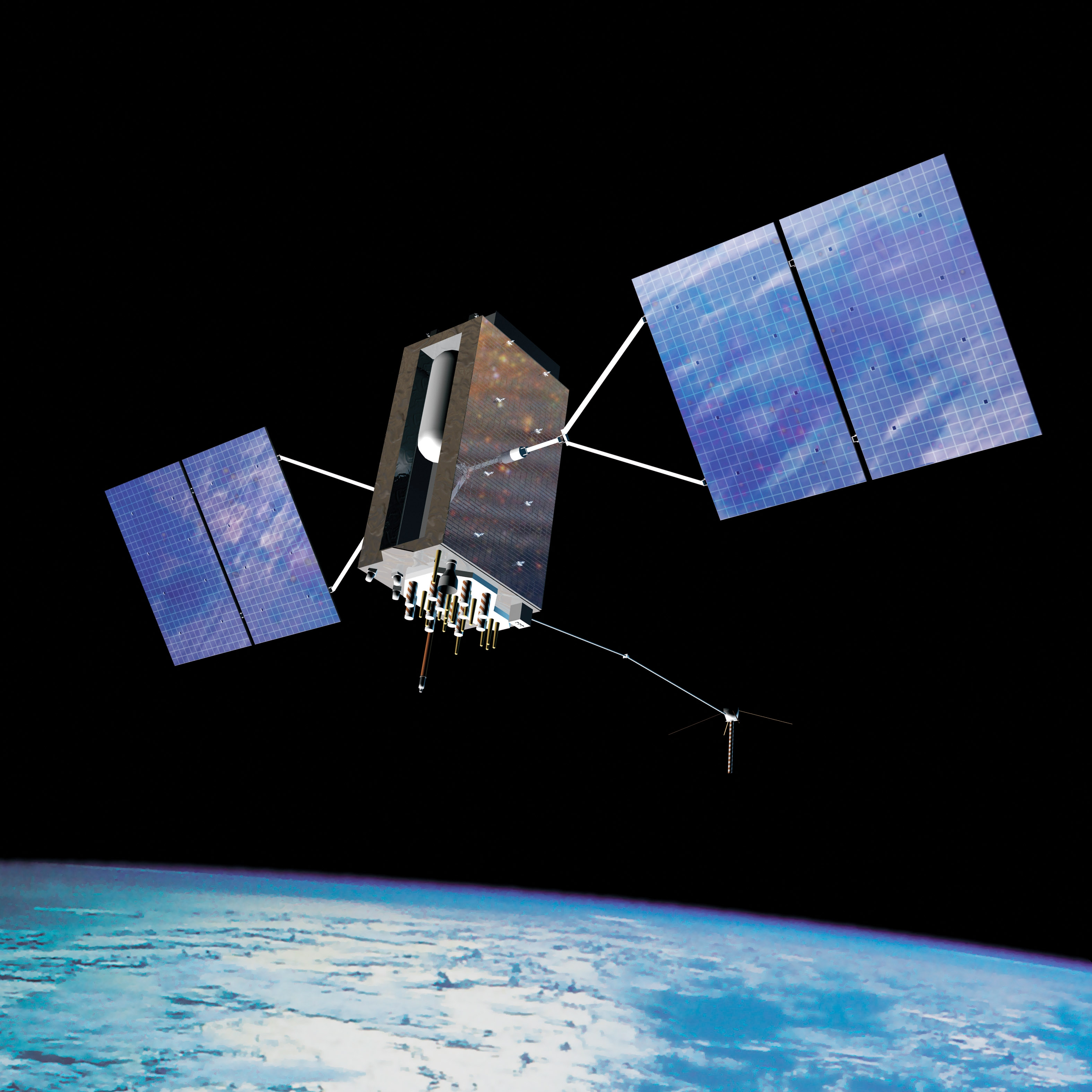
Artist's rendering of GPS-III satellite in orbit

SV01 is the first GPS Block III satellite to be launched. Ordered in 2008 and originally intended to be launched in 2014, numerous technical delays pushed launch back to 2018.

The spacecraft is built on the Lockheed Martin A2100 satellite bus, and weighs in at 4,400kg (9,700lbs), making SV01 the heaviest GPS satellite ever launched.

The satellite was given the nickname Vespucci, after explorer and navigator Amerigo Vespucci.

== Launch ==
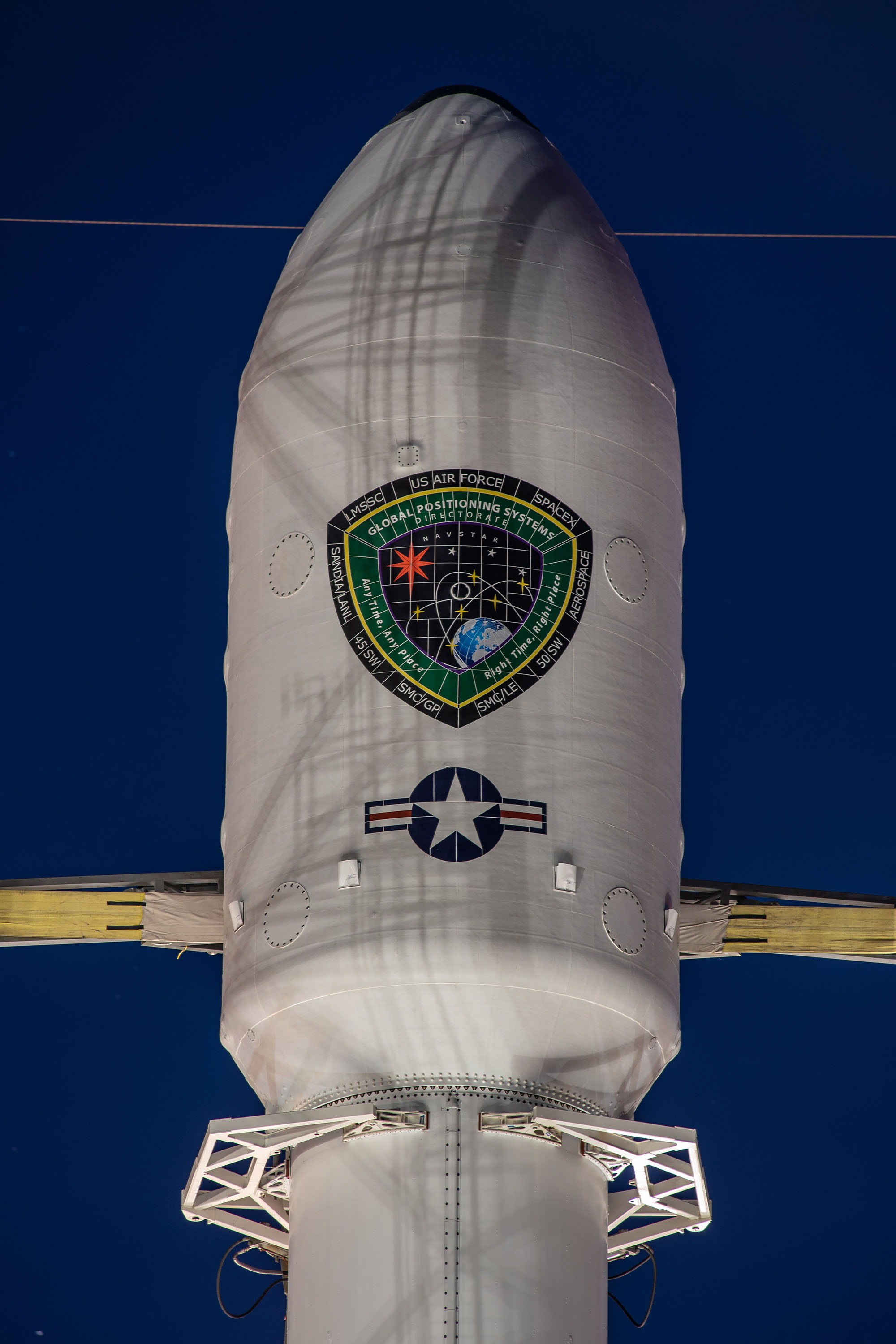
GPS-III 01 satellite inside Falcon 9 Payload fairing at SLC-40

USA-289 was launched by SpaceX on 23 December 2018 at 13:51 UTC atop expendable Falcon 9 booster B1054. The launch took place from SLC-40 of the Cape Canaveral Air Force Station, and placed USA-289 directly into semi-synchronous orbit.

== Orbit ==
As of 2021, USA-289 was in a 55-degree inclination orbit with a perigee of 20,158 kilometers (12,525 miles) and an apogee of 20,222 kilometers (12,565 miles). The satellite is the first GPS satellite to be able to broadcast the civilian L1C signal.

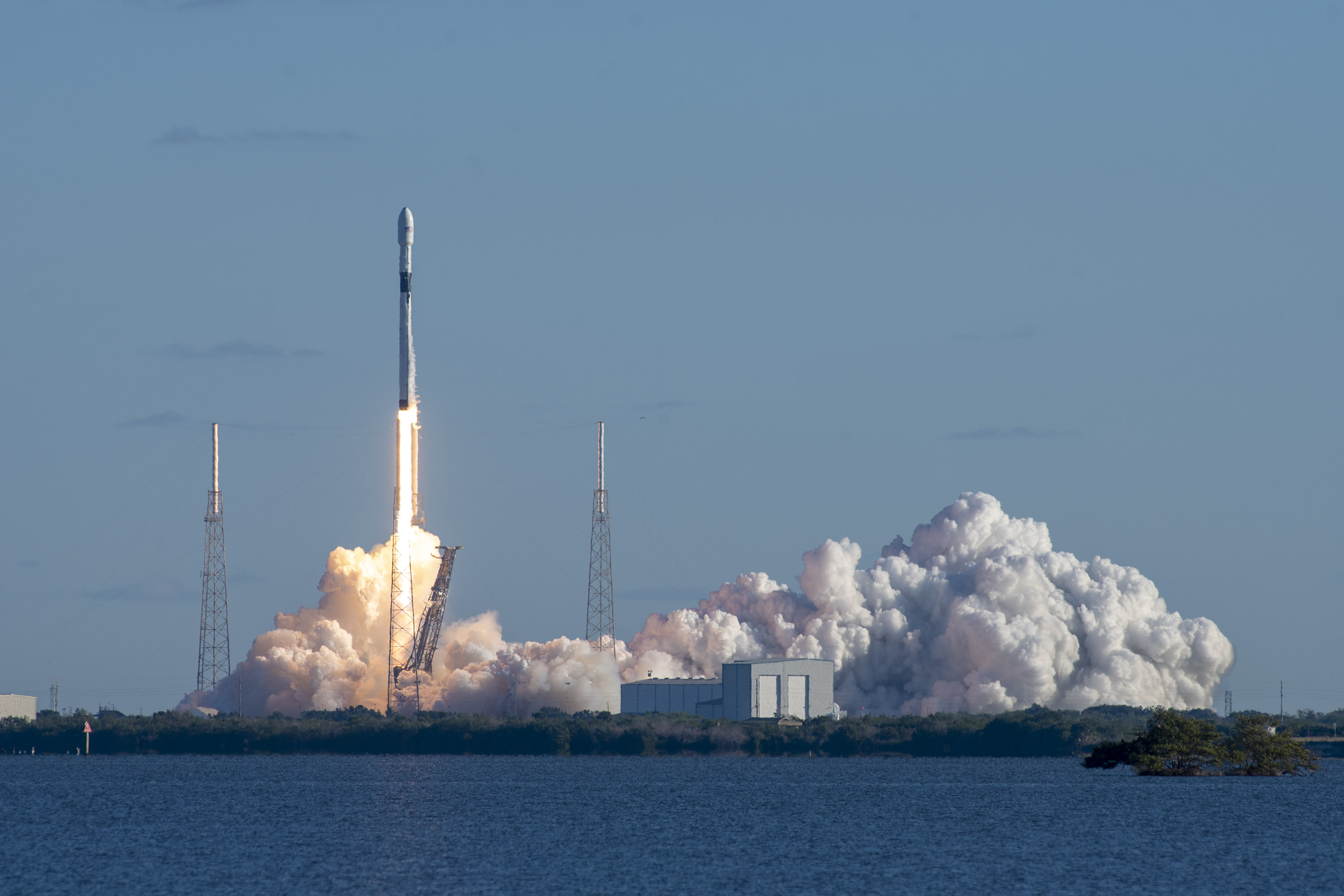
GPS-III SV01 is launched on a Falcon 9.
