= Cape Canaveral Space Launch Complex 40 =

Rocket launch site in Florida, US

Space Launch Complex 40
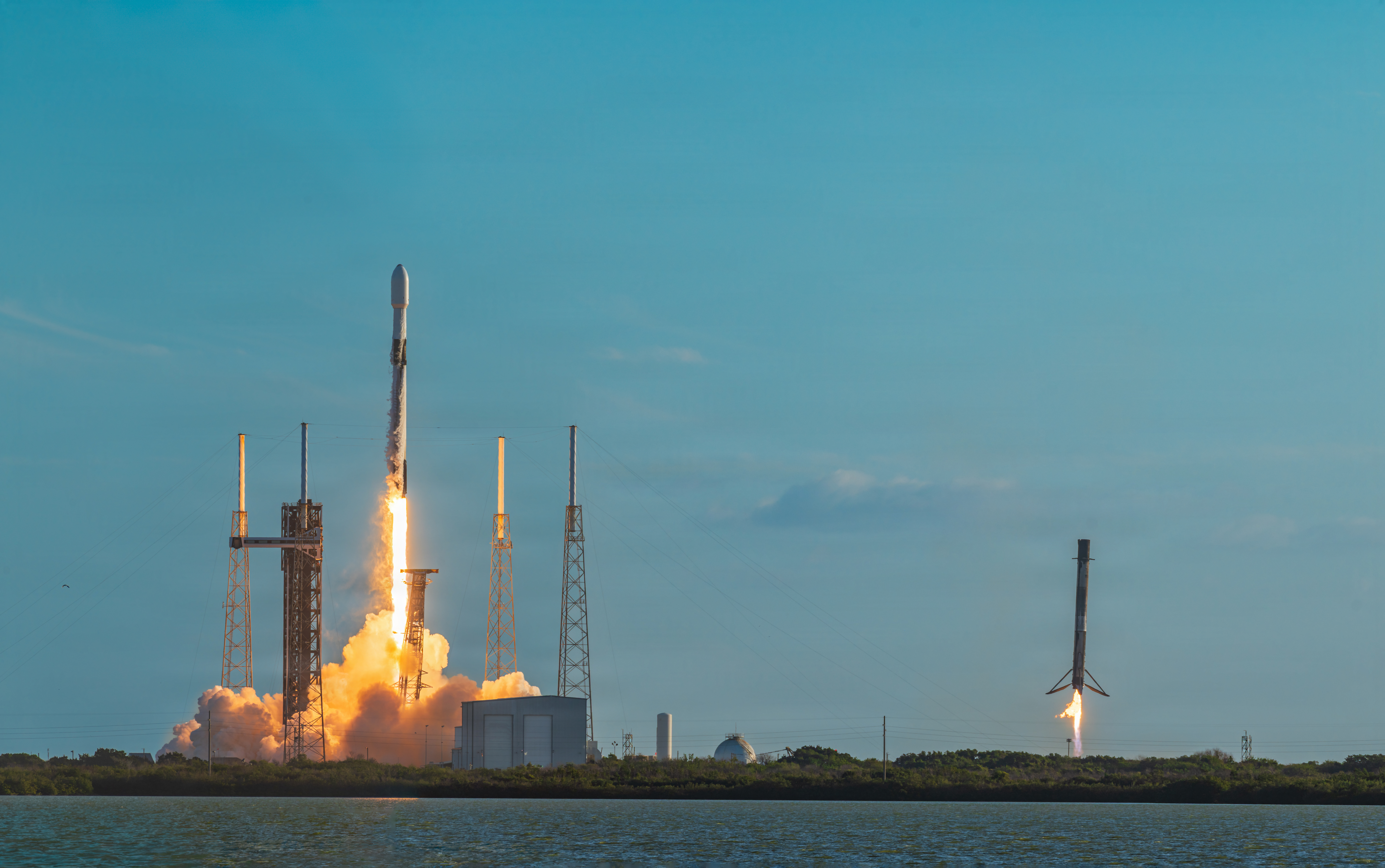
- Composite image of NG-24 launch from SLC-40 and subsequent booster landing at LZ-40, capturing both events 8 minutes apart
- Interactive map of Space Launch Complex 40
- Launch site: Cape Canaveral Space Force Station
- Location: 28°33′43″N 80°34′38″W
- Time zone: UTC−05:00 (EST)
  - Summer (DST): UTC−04:00 (EDT)
- Short name: SLC-40
- Operator: United States Space Force (owner); SpaceX (tenant)
- Orbital inclination range: 28.5–55, 66–145°
Launch history
- Status: Active
- Launches: 403
- First launch: 18 June 1965; Titan IIIC (Mass simulator)
- Last launch: 20 October 2026; Falcon 9 Block 5 (Bandwagon-5)
- Associated rockets: Current: Falcon 9; Retired: Titan IIIC, Titan 34D, Commercial Titan III, Titan IV; Plans cancelled: Titan IIIM
LZ-40 landing history
- Status: Active
- Landings: 8
- First landing: 13 February 2026; Falcon 9 Block 5 (SpaceX Crew-12)
- Last landing: 13 October 2026; Falcon 9 Block 5 (SpaceX CRS-35)
- Associated rockets: Current: Falcon 9, Falcon Heavy

Space Launch Complex 40 (SLC-40), sometimes referred to as "Slick Forty," is one of two launch pads located at the Integrate-Transfer-Launch Complex in Cape Canaveral Space Force Station, Florida. It initially opened as Launch Complex 40 (LC-40) and was used by the United States Air Force alongside the neighboring Space Launch Complex 41 for the Titan III program. It first saw use by the Titan IIIC throughout the 1960s and 1970s, before getting retrofitted for the Titan 34D during the 1980s. In the 1990s, Martin Marietta and the Air Force upgraded it to launch the Commercial Titan III, but the rocket's lack of success caused the pad to be used by the Titan IV throughout the decade and into the 2000s.

Following the Titan family's retirement, SLC-40 was leased to SpaceX in 2007 for use by their new rocket, the Falcon 9. Since the early 2010s, the pad has transformed into a high-volume launch site for the Falcon 9, being mainly used to service the company's Starlink megaconstellation. As of September 2026, the pad has hosted over 345 Falcon 9 launches.

In late 2025 to early 2026, SpaceX added Landing Zone 40 (LZ-40), a new Falcon landing zone within the SLC‑40 launch complex to replace Landing Zones 1 and 2 following the expiration of their lease at Launch Complex 13.

== History ==
=== Titan IIIC and 34D (1965–1989) ===
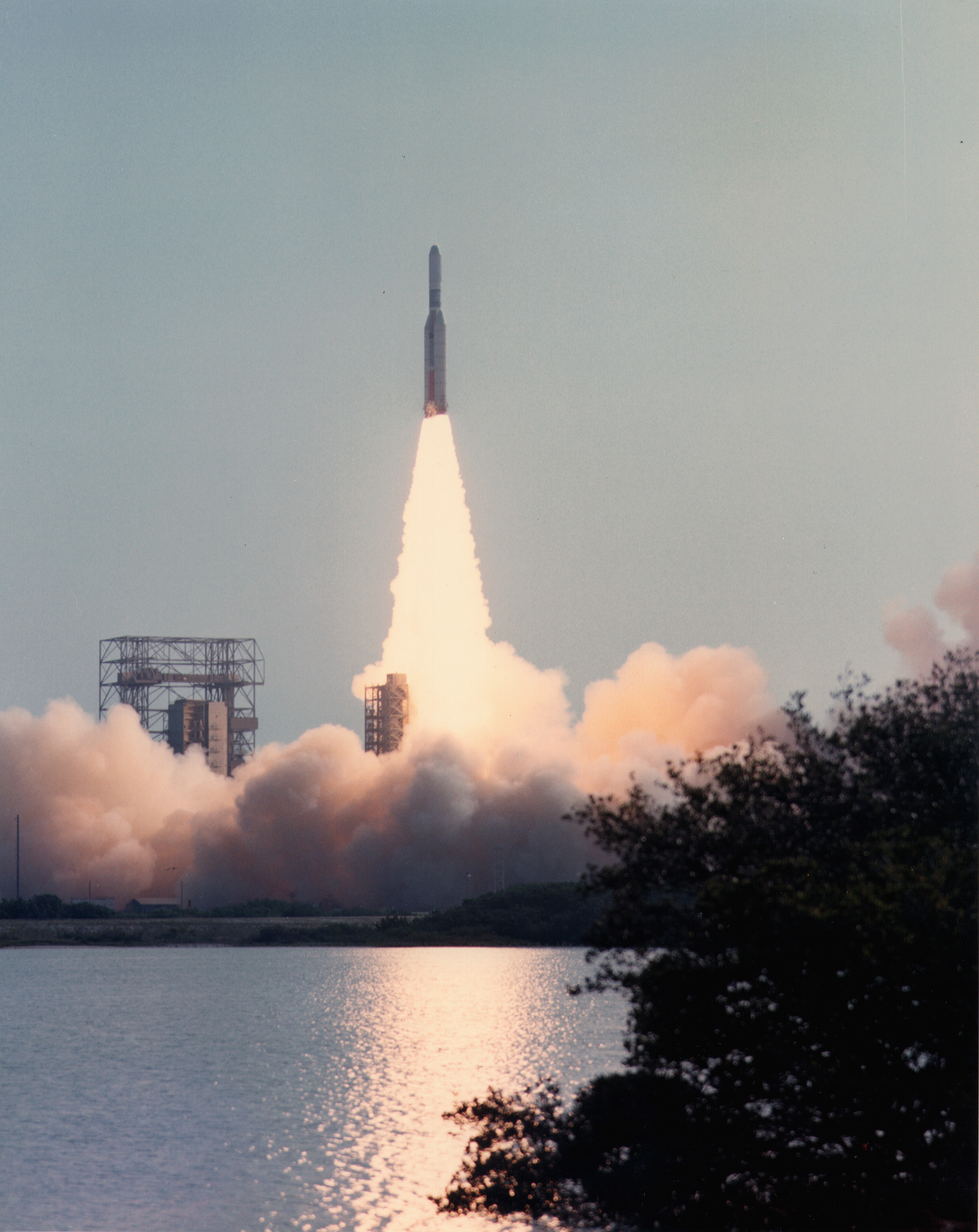
LC-40 in 1974, launching a Titan IIIC with ATS-6

Launch Complex 40 was originally constructed by the United States Air Force as one of two launch pads of the Integrate-Transfer-Launch Complex (ITL), tasked with launching Titan III rockets with solid rocket boosters. The ITL was similar to Launch Complex 39 at the nearby Kennedy Space Center, where Titans would get assembled at the Vertical Integration Building (demolished in 2006), have their boosters built and attached at the Solid Motor Assembly Building (now used by SpaceX to process Falcon 9 payloads), and launched from either LC-40 or Launch Complex 41 (LC-41, now SLC-41).

LC-40 hosted its inaugural launch in June 1965, a Titan IIIC rocket with a 9,500 kg (21,000 lb) mass simulator to test the Transtage upper stage. Almost every Titan IIIC launch from the pad carried a military payload, the vast majority of them being classified reconnaissance satellites. Additionally, the ITL was planned to launch the Titan IIIM for the Air Force's Manned Orbiting Laboratory (MOL) program, using it as a testing ground before the operational launch site at Vandenberg Air Force Base's SLC-6 would be activated. The only MOL launch made before the program's cancellation occurred at LC-40, with OPS 0855 lifting off in November 1966 with the first capsule to be reused, Gemini SC-2 previously flown on Gemini 2.

Going into the 1970s, LC-40 became the dedicated launch site for the Titan IIIC within the ITL, as LC-41 would undergo modifications to launch the Titan IIIE. Throughout the rest of the decade, the complex would see approximately one to three Titan IIIC launches a year until the rocket's replacement with the Titan 34D in the early 1980s. Similarly to its predecessor, every Titan 34D launch from the pad was for military purposes, being used to put payloads into geostationary transfer orbit.

=== Commercial Titan III and Titan IV (1990–2005) ===
In the late 1980s, Titan manufacturer Martin Marietta and the Air Force converted the ITL to their new Titan configurations: LC-40 would be used to launch the civilian-focused Commercial Titan III, while LC-41 would be for the military-oriented Titan IV. Additionally, Titan IV processing would go through the newly built Solid Motor Assembly and Readiness Facility (now used by United Launch Alliance for future assembly of Vulcan Centaur rockets) before launch. This setup did not last, as the Commercial Titan III's price compared to cheaper systems like Delta II and Ariane 4 limited its customer base into early retirement. That being said, a handful of notable payloads were launched from LC-40 in this era, like Intelsat 603 in March 1990 (of which a stage malfunction caused it to be visited by Space Shuttle Endeavour during STS-49) and the failed Mars Observer in September 1992.

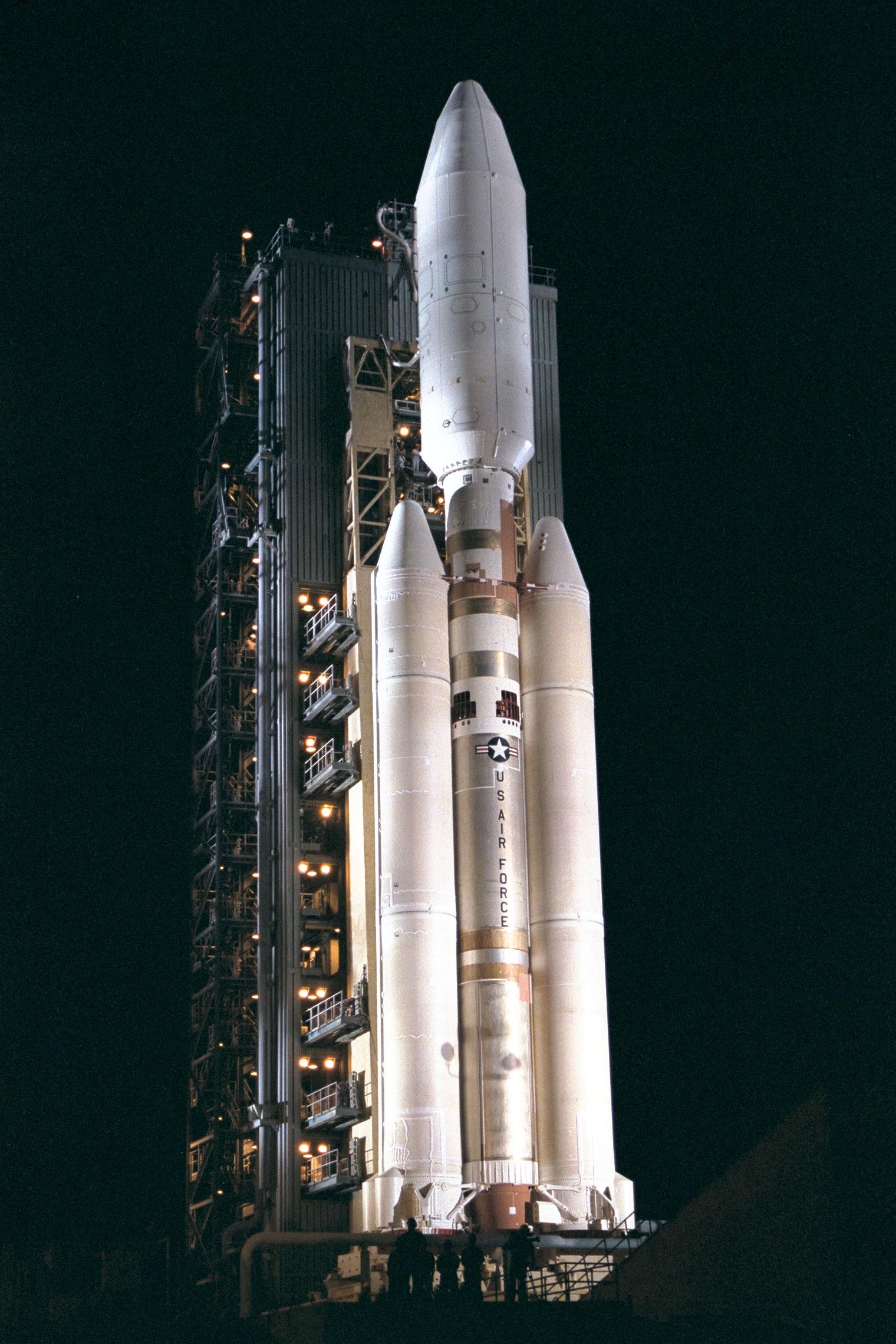
A Titan IV rocket with the Cassini–Huygens payload at LC-40 in 1997

Following the Commercial Titan III's retirement, LC-40 was converted to complement LC-41 in the launches of the Titan IV. As was typical for the Titan family, almost all launches in the decade carried military payloads; the only exception to this was NASA and ESA's Cassini–Huygens mission to Saturn in October 1997. Going into the new millennium, the cost of Titan launches led to Lockheed Martin (who assumed the control of Titan following Martin Marietta's merger with Lockheed) winding down and announcing the retirement of the Titan family in favor of their cheaper Atlas launch vehicles. As such, the last Titan IV launches at the ITL were made from LC-40, with LC-41 and the SMARF converted to process and launch the Atlas V. Over its lifetime, LC-40 supported a total of 55 Titan launches, including 26 Titan IIICs, eight Titan 34Ds, four Commercial Titan IIIs, and 17 Titan IVs. The final Titan launch from LC-40 was the Lacrosse-5 reconnaissance satellite carried on a Titan IV-B on April 30, 2005.

Following the conclusion of Titan operations, the launch complex underwent significant transformation. The tower was dismantled in early 2008, followed by the controlled demolition of the Mobile Service Structure later that year.

=== SpaceX and Falcon 9 (2007–present) ===
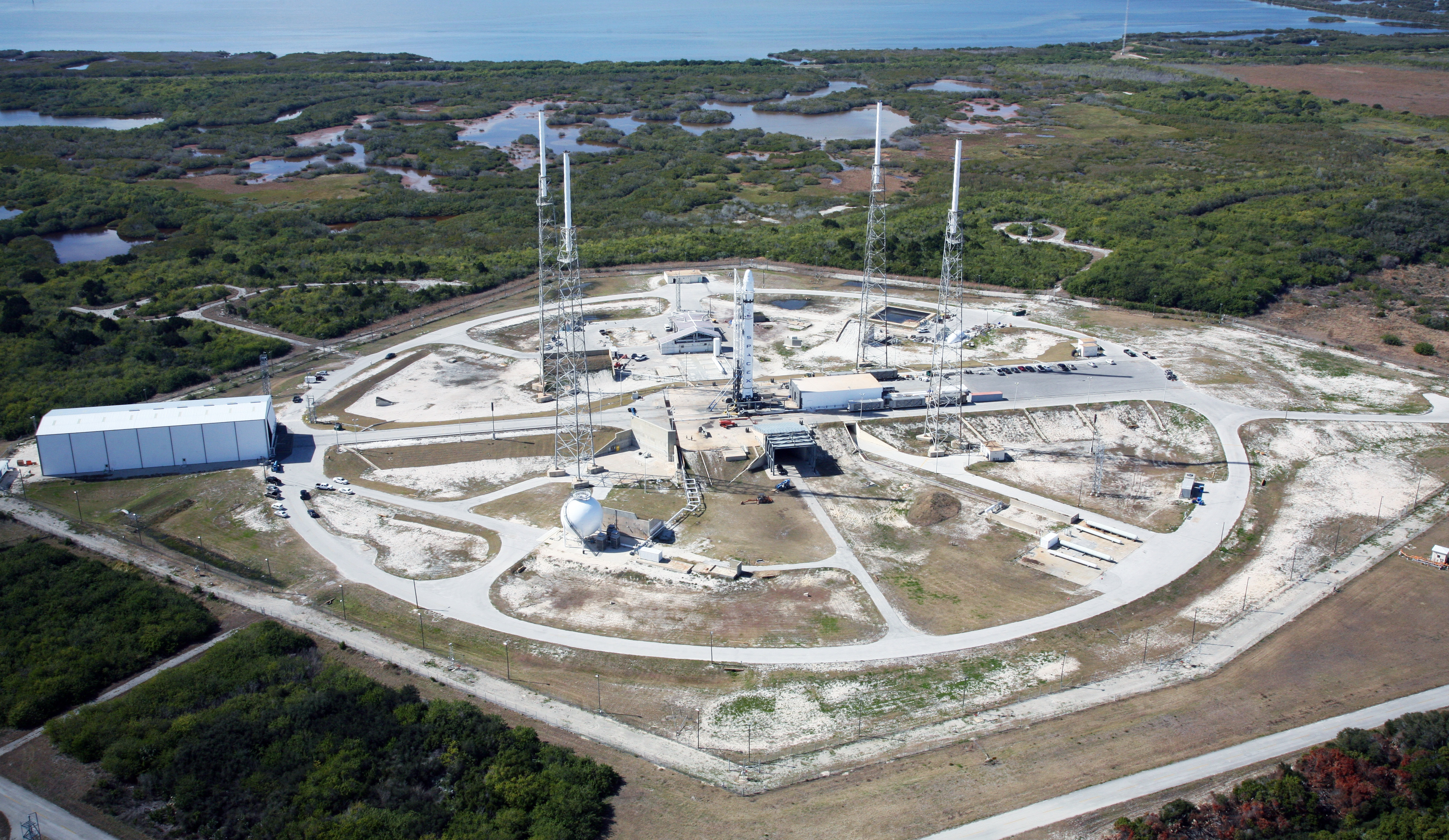
SLC-40 in February 2010 with Falcon 9 v1.0 rocket carrying Dragon Spacecraft Qualification Unit

SpaceX leased LC-40 from the U.S. Air Force in April 2007 to launch its Falcon 9 rocket, getting renamed to SLC-40 much like what happened to SLC-41 and SLC-37. Ground facility construction began the following year, including a rocket and payload preparation hangar and new fuel tanks. A spherical liquid oxygen tank previously used at LC-34 was purchased from NASA.

The first Falcon 9 arrived in late 2008, with the inaugural launch in June 2010 carrying a dummy payload. A Dragon spacecraft demonstration flight followed in December. Starting in 2012, SLC-40 became the primary launch site for the Dragon cargo vehicle providing provide two-way logistics to and from the International Space Station, a role previously filled by the Space Shuttle until its retirement in 2011.

To accommodate the heavier Falcon 9 v1.1 rocket, the launch pad was modified in 2013. Launch frequency gradually increased from 2014, with a mix of Dragon and satellite missions.

A catastrophic explosion occurred at SLC-40 in September 2016 during a static fire test, destroying a Falcon 9 rocket and its payload, the AMOS-6 satellite. The incident caused significant damage to the launch pad. After a thorough investigation and cleanup, repairs and upgrades began in early 2017. SLC-40 returned to service in December 2017 with the successful launch of CRS-13.

SpaceX had leased Launch Complex 39A (LC-39A) at the nearby Kennedy Space Center from NASA in April 2014, which allowed launches to continue to from Florida during the reconstruction of SLC-40. In August 2018, LC-39A's crew access tower received an access arm, allowing crew to be loaded onto Crew Dragon 2 capsules along with late payload changes on Cargo Dragon 2 capsules. Because SLC-40 lacked an access tower, Dragon missions were paused after the original Dragon 1 capsule was retired in 2020.

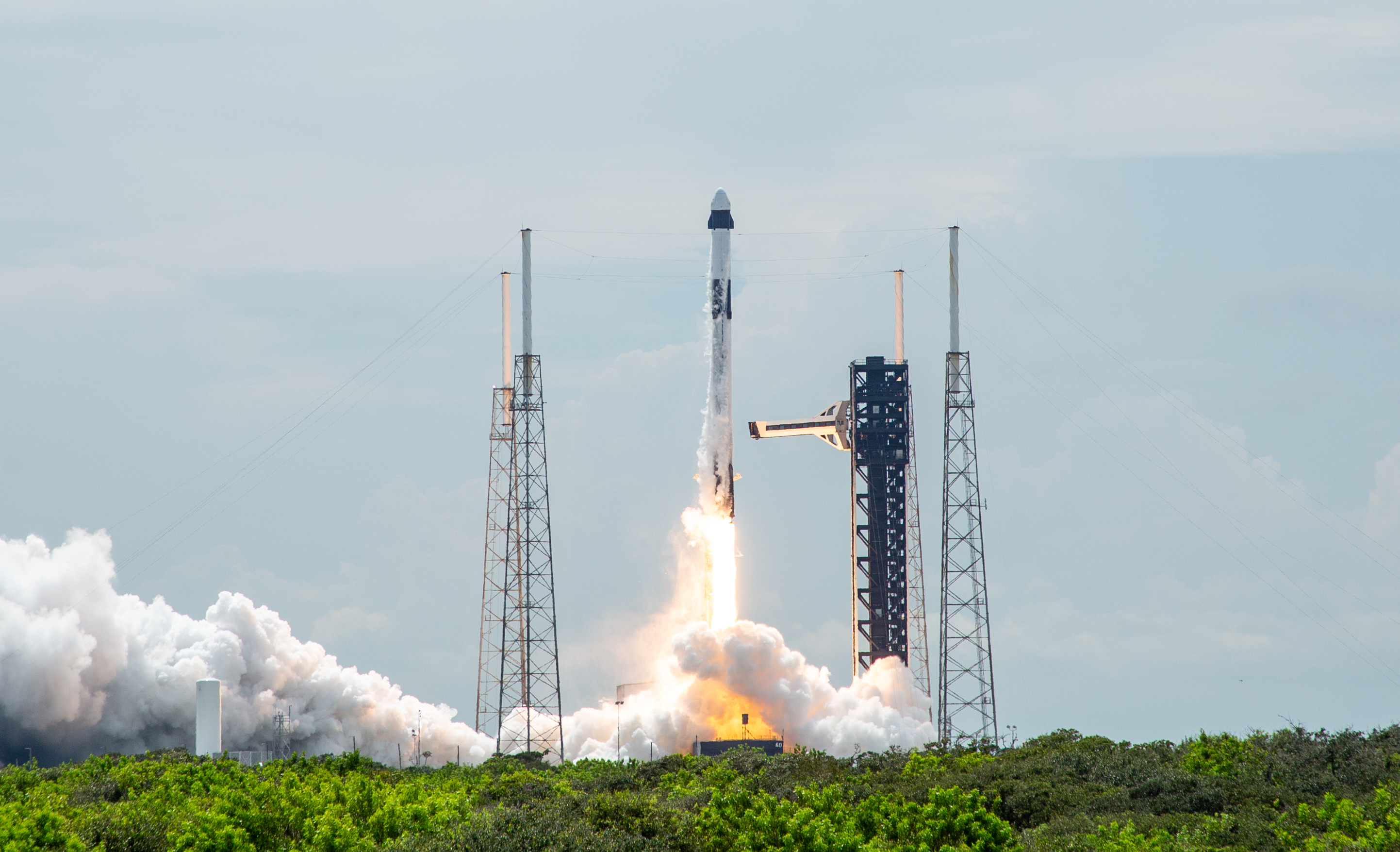
SpaceX Crew-9 launching from SLC-40, with the crew access arm retracted for flight.

In the 2020s, SLC-40 would become SpaceX's "workhorse" launch pad, hosting less complex satellite launch missions as frequently as every week, completing 50 launches of this launch pad alone in 2023. Meanwhile, LC-39A was used less, being reserved for Dragon crew and cargo flights, Falcon Heavy missions, and other complex missions.

To add additional operational flexibility and reduce reliance on LC-39A, in early 2023, SpaceX began constructing an access tower at SLC-40. In February 2024, SpaceX tested its new emergency escape system for future crewed missions, which uses an evacuation slide instead of the slidewire baskets used at LC-39A.

The tower was first used ahead of in early 2024 to accommodate late loading of supplies into cargo spacecraft. SLC-40 was used to launch its first crewed mission in September 2024, SpaceX Crew-9. The mission had been slated to use LC-39A, but was shifted to SLC-40 when the launch was delayed due to issues with the Boeing Starliner Calypso spacecraft that was docked to the ISS. In addition, the delay would have bled into LC-39A's conversion process into Falcon Heavy launches, as one was being used to launch NASA's Europa Clipper in October.

SpaceX built a Falcon landing pad within the SLC‑40 launch complex to eliminate use of Landing Zones 1 and 2. The first landing on this pad occurred on February 13, 2026.

== Launch & Landing history ==
Launch sites at Cape Canaveral Space Force Station and Kennedy Space Center
Active pads
Inactive leased pads
Inactive unleased pads
Repurposed pads, not used for launches
1 LC-39B
2 LC-39A
3 LC-48
4 SLC-41
5 SLC-40
6 LC-47
7 SLC-37
8 LC-34
9 SLC-20
10 LC-19
11 LC-16
12 LC-15
13 LC-14
14 LC-13 (LZ-2)
15 LC-12
16 LC-11
17 LC-36
18 LC-1, LC-2, LC-3, and LC-4
19 SLC-46
20 LC-21 and LC-22
21 LC-31 and LC-32
22 LC-18
23 SLC-17
24 LC-26
25 LC-5 and LC-6
26 LC-30
27 LC-25
28 LC-29

=== SLC-40 ===
- Titan III-C
- Titan 34D
- Commercial Titan III
- Titan IV
- Falcon 9

==== Titan III and IV ====
All IIIC, 34D, and IV flights operated by the United States Air Force. All Commercial flights operated by Martin Marietta.

No.	Date	Time (UTC)	Launch vehicle	S/N and Configuration	Payload	Result	Remarks
1	18 June 1965	14:00	Titan IIIC	3C-7	Mass simulator	Success	Maiden flight of the Titan IIIC. First flight from LC-40 and the ITL Complex.
2	15 October 1965	17:24	Titan IIIC	3C-4	LCS-2	Failure	Transtage ultimately failed while in low Earth orbit due to leak in oxidizer tank.
3	3 November 1966	13:50	Titan IIIC	3C-9	OPS-0855 (Gemini B)	Success	Only flight for the Air Force's Manned Orbiting Laboratory program. Gemini B capsule flew on a suborbital trajectory while the rest continued into orbit. First ever flight of a reused spacecraft, being Gemini SC-2 flown on Gemini 2.
4	8 April 1970	10:50	Titan IIIC	3C-18	OPS-7033 and OPS-7034 (Vela)	Success	First Titan IIIC flight following rocket's decommission from LC-41.
5	6 November 1970	10:35	Titan IIIC	3C-19	OPS-5960 (DSP)	Partial failure	Third burn of Transtage failed, leaving payload unusable in a lower orbit than intended.
6	5 May 1971	07:43	Titan IIIC	3C-20	OPS-3811 (DSP)	Success	
7	3 November 1971	03:09	Titan IIIC	3C-21	OPS-9431 and OPS-9432 (DSCS-II)	Success	
8	1 March 1972	09:39	Titan IIIC	3C-22	OPS-1570 (DSP)	Success	
9	13 June 1973	07:14	Titan IIIC	3C-24	OPS-6157 (DSP)	Success	
10	13 December 1973	23:57	Titan IIIC	3C-26	OPS-9433 and OPS-9434 (DSCS-II)	Success	
11	30 May 1974	13:00	Titan IIIC	3C-27	ATS-6	Success	Part of the Applications Technology Satellites program. Collaboration between NASA and ISRO. First civilian launch from LC-40.
12	20 May 1975	14:03	Titan IIIC	3C-25	OPS-9435 and OPS-9436 (DSCS-II)	Failure	Failure of Transtage's inertial measurement unit left payload stranded in LEO.
13	14 December 1975	05:15	Titan IIIC	3C-29	OPS-3165 (DSP)	Success	
14	15 March 1975	01:25	Titan IIIC	3C-30	LES-8, LES-9, Solrad 11A, and Solrad 11B	Success	
15	26 June 1976	03:00	Titan IIIC	3C-28	OPS-2112 (DSP)	Success	
16	6 February 1977	06:00	Titan IIIC	3C-23	OPS-3151 (DSP)	Success	
17	12 May 1977	14:26	Titan IIIC	3C-32	OPS-9437 and OPS-9438 (DSCS-II)	Success	
18	25 March 1978	18:09	Titan IIIC	3C-35	OPS-9439 and OPS-9440 (DSCS-II)	Failure	Hydraulics pump failure in second stage forced range safety protocols to be activated 8 minutes into flight.
19	10 June 1978	19:12	Titan IIIC	3C-33	OPS-9454 (Vortex)	Success	
20	14 December 1978	00:43	Titan IIIC	3C-36	OPS-9441 and OPS-9442 (DSCS-II)	Success	
21	10 June 1979	13:39	Titan IIIC	3C-31	OPS-7484 (DSP)	Success	
22	1 October 1979	11:22	Titan IIIC	3C-34	OPS-1948 (Vortex)	Success	
23	21 November 1979	21:36	Titan IIIC	3C-37	OPS-9443 and OPS-9444 (DSCS-II)	Success	
24	16 March 1981	19:24	Titan IIIC	3C-40	OPS-7390 (DSP)	Success	
25	31 October 1981	09:22	Titan IIIC	3C-39	OPS-4029 (Vortex)	Success	
26	6 March 1982	19:25	Titan IIIC	3C-38	OPS-8701 (DSP)	Success	Final flight of the Titan IIIC.
27	30 October 1982	03:05	Titan 34D	34D-1, IUS	OPS-9445 (DSCS-II) and DSCS-III 1	Success	Maiden flight of the Titan 34D, and first flight of the Inertial Upper Stage. Only Titan 34D flight with an IUS.
28	31 January 1984	03:08	Titan 34D	34D-10, Transtage	OPS-0441 (Vortex)	Success	
29	14 April 1984	16:52	Titan 34D	34D-11, Transtage	OPS-7641 (DSP)	Success	
30	22 December 1984	00:02	Titan 34D	34D-13, Transtage	USA-7 (DSP)	Success	
31	29 November 1987	03:28	Titan 34D	34D-8, Transtage	USA-28 (DSP)	Success	
32	2 September 1988	12:05	Titan 34D	34D-3, Transtage	USA-31 (Vortex)	Partial failure	Broken pressurization lines forced early shutdown of Transtage during apogee burn, placing satellite in lower than intended orbit.
33	10 May 1989	19:47	Titan 34D	34D-16, Transtage	USA-37 (Vortex)	Success	
34	4 September 1989	05:54	Titan 34D	34D-2, Transtage	USA-42 (DSCS-II) and USA-43 (DSCS-III)	Success	Final flight of the Titan 34D and final flight of the Transtage.
35	1 January 1990	00:07	Commercial Titan III	CT-1	Skynet 4A and JCSAT 2	Success	Maiden flight of the Commercial Titan III, and first commercial launch from LC-40.
36	14 March 1990	11:52	Commercial Titan III	CT-2	Intelsat 603	Partial failure	Second stage failed to separate from kick motor, leaving payload stranded in LEO. Was visited by Space Shuttle Endeavour during STS-49 two years later, where a new kickstage was attached and boosted into geostationary orbit.
37	23 June 1990	11:19	Commercial Titan III	CT-3	Intelsat 604	Success	
38	25 September 1992	17:05	Commercial Titan III	CT-4	Mars Observer	Success	Only flight of the Planetary Observer program, aimed at studying Mars. Final flight of the Commercial Titan III and final launch of the Titan III subfamily. First launch beyond geostationary orbit from LC-40. While launch was successful, communication was lost prior to Mars orbit insertion, likely due to a rupture in the fuel tank system.
39	7 February 1994	21:47	Titan IV	K-10, 401A / Centaur	USA-99 (Milstar)	Success	First Titan IV flight from LC-40. First Titan IV flight with a Centaur third stage.
40	22 December 1994	22:19	Titan IV	K-14, 402A / IUS	USA-107 (DSP)	Success	
41	14 May 1995	13:45	Titan IV	K-23, 401A / Centaur	USA-110 (Orion)	Success	
42	6 November 1995	05:15	Titan IV	K-21, 401A / Centaur	USA-115 (Milstar)	Success	
43	3 July 1996	00:31	Titan IV	K-2, 405A	USA-125 (SDS)	Success	Final Titan IV-A flight from LC-40.
44	23 February 1997	20:20	Titan IV	B-24, 402B / IUS	USA-130 (DSP)	Success	Maiden flight of the Titan IV-B.
45	15 October 1997	08:43	Titan IV	B-33, 401B / Centaur	Cassini-Huygens	Success	Part of the Large Strategic Science Missions, aimed at studying Saturn and its moons such as Titan and Enceladus. Collaboration between NASA, ESA, and the ASI. First spacecraft to orbit Saturn. Included the Huygens lander, first spacecraft to land on an outer solar system body and a moon besides the Moon. Only civilian launch on a Titan IV, and final Titan flight to go beyond geostationary orbit.
46	9 May 1998	01:38	Titan IV	B-25, 401B / Centaur	NROL-6	Success	NRO launch. Orion satellite, also known as USA-139. First acknowledged launch by the National Reconnaissance Office from LC-40.
47	30 April 1999	16:30	Titan IV	B-32, 401B / Centaur	USA-143 (Milstar)	Failure	Database error in Centaur lead to failure of attitude control and incorrect burns, placing satellite into useless orbit.
48	8 May 2000	16:01	Titan IV	B-29, 402B / IUS	USA-149 (DSP)	Success	
49	27 February 2001	21:20	Titan IV	B-41, 401B / Centaur	USA-157 (Milstar)	Success	
50	6 August 2001	07:28	Titan IV	B-31, 402B / IUS	USA-159 (DSP)	Success	
51	16 January 2002	00:30	Titan IV	B-38, 401B / Centaur	USA-164 (Milstar)	Success	
52	8 April 2003	13:43	Titan IV	B-35, 401B / Centaur	USA-169 (Milstar)	Success	
53	9 September 2003	04:29	Titan IV	B-36, 401B / Centaur	NROL-19	Success	NRO launch. Orion satellite, also known as USA-171. Final Titan flight with a Centaur.
54	14 February 2004	18:50	Titan IV	B-39, 402B / IUS	USA-176 (DSP)	Success	Final flight of the Inertial Upper Stage.
55	30 April 2005	00:50	Titan IV	B-26, 405B	NROL-16	Success	NRO launch. Lacrosse satellite, also known as USA-182. Final Titan IV launch from LC-40, final Titan launch from Cape Canaveral, and penultimate flight of the Titan family. The final flight was made in October at SLC-4E in Vandenberg.

==== Falcon 9 (2010–23) ====
All flights operated by SpaceX.

No.	Date	Time (UTC)	Launch Vehicle	Booster flight (Note: Falcon 9 first-stage boosters have a four-digit serial number. A hyphen followed by a number indicates the flight count. For example, B1021‑1 and B1021‑2 represent the first and second flights of booster B1021. Boosters without a hyphen were expended on their first flight.)	Payload/mission	Result	Remarks
56	4 June 2010	18:45	Falcon 9 v1.0	0003	Dragon Spacecraft Qualification Unit	Success	Maiden flight of Falcon 9 and first launch as SLC-40. Flew a boilerplate Dragon capsule attached to the second stage.
57	8 December 2010	05:43	Falcon 9 v1.0	0004	SpaceX COTS Demo-1	Success	Demo flight for Commercial Resupply Services. Maiden flight of an operational Dragon spacecraft. First orbital flight of pressurized commercial spacecraft.
58	22 May 2012	07:44	Falcon 9 v1.0	0005	SpaceX COTS Demo-2	Success	Demo flight for Commercial Resupply Services. Berthed to the International Space Station, becoming the first commercial spacecraft to visit it.
59	8 October 2012	00:35	Falcon 9 v1.0	0006	SpaceX CRS-1	Success	ISS resupply flight. First operational CRS flight. Carried an Orbcomm satellite as a secondary payload, but an engine failure on the first stage forced it to be deployed in a lower than intended orbit.
60	1 March 2013	15:10	Falcon 9 v1.0	0007	SpaceX CRS-2	Success	ISS resupply flight. Final flight of Falcon 9 v1.0.
61	3 December 2013	22:41	Falcon 9 v1.1	1004	SES 8	Success	First flight of Falcon 9 v1.1 from SLC-40 and first non-Dragon flight for Falcon 9 from Cape Canaveral. First Falcon 9 flight to geostationary orbit.
62	6 January 2014	22:06	Falcon 9 v1.1	1005	Thaicom 6	Success	
63	18 April 2014	19:25	Falcon 9 v1.1	1006	SpaceX CRS-3	Success	ISS resupply flight. First Dragon flight on Falcon 9 v1.1. Booster performed a soft water landing.
64	14 July 2014	15:15	Falcon 9 v1.1	1007	Orbcomm-OG2-1	Success	Booster performed a soft water landing.
65	5 August 2014	08:00	Falcon 9 v1.1	1008	AsiaSat 8	Success	
66	7 September 2014	05:00	Falcon 9 v1.1	1011	AsiaSat 6	Success	
67	21 September 2014	05:52	Falcon 9 v1.1	1010	SpaceX CRS-4	Success	ISS resupply fight. Booster attempted a soft water landing, but ran out of liquid oxygen and crashed.
68	10 January 2015	09:47	Falcon 9 v1.1	1012	SpaceX CRS-5	Success	ISS resupply fight. First attempt at a first stage landing, and first deployment of drone ship Just Read the Instructions. grid-fins lost hydraulic fluid and caused it to crash.
69	11 February 2015	23:03	Falcon 9 v1.1	1013	DSCOVR	Success	Earth observation satellite and solar weather satellite. First deep space probe for NOAA. First Falcon 9 flight beyond geostationary orbit, to the L_{1} Lagrange point. Booster performed a soft water landing.
70	2 March 2015	03:50	Falcon 9 v1.1	1014	ABS 3A and Eutelsat 115 West B	Success	
71	14 April 2015	20:10	Falcon 9 v1.1	1015	SpaceX CRS-6	Success	ISS resupply fight. Attempt at a first stage landing, but a stuck throttle valve caused excess lateral velocity and caused it to crash.
72	27 April 2015	23:03	Falcon 9 v1.1	1016	TurkmenAlem52E / MonacoSat	Success	
73	28 June 2015	14:21	Falcon 9 v1.1	1018	SpaceX CRS-7	Failure	ISS resupply fight. Intended to launch and deliver IDA-1. Final flight of Falcon 9 v1.1 from Cape Canaveral, and first deployment of drone ship Of Course I Still Love You. Overpressure incident in second stage LOX tank 150 seconds into launch caused vehicle to break up. Dragon capsule survived breakup, but was destroyed upon impacting the ocean due to having no parachute deployment protocols for aborts.
74	22 December 2015	01:29	Falcon 9 Full Thrust	1019	Orbcomm OG2-2	Success	First successful Falcon 9 landing, and first landing attempt at Landing Zone 1 in LC-13. Maiden flight of Falcon 9 Full Thrust, and first landing attempt with a non-Dragon payload.
75	4 March 2016	23:35	Falcon 9 Full Thrust	1020	SES-9	Success	First landing attempt on a flight heading beyond low Earth orbit. Booster failed to kill velocity during descent and crashed.
76	8 April 2016	20:43	Falcon 9 Full Thrust	1021‑1	SpaceX CRS-8	Success	ISS resupply flight. Launched and delivered the Bigelow Expandable Activity Module. First successful drone ship landing. First Dragon flight on Falcon 9 Full Thrust. Booster would be eventually reflown on SES-10.
77	6 May 2016	05:21	Falcon 9 Full Thrust	1022	JCSAT-14	Success	First successful landing on a flight heading beyond LEO.
78	27 May 2016	21:39	Falcon 9 Full Thrust	1023‑1	Thaicom 8	Success	Booster would eventually be reflown on the Falcon Heavy test flight.
79	15 June 2016	14:29	Falcon 9 Full Thrust	1024	Eutelsat 117 West B and ABS 2A	Success	
80	18 July 2016	04:45	Falcon 9 Full Thrust	1025‑1	SpaceX CRS-9	Success	ISS resupply flight. Launched and delivered IDA-2.
81	14 August 2016	05:26	Falcon 9 Full Thrust	1026	JCSAT-16	Success	Final Falcon 9 flight before the AMOS-6 explosion.
-	Planned for 3 September 2016	Cancelled	Falcon 9 Full Thrust	1028	AMOS-6	Precluded	Buckled liner in several COPVs led to deflagration in the second stage during fuel loading prior to a static-fire test on 1 September. Satellite lost in accident, leading to change in SpaceX policy where active payloads are not used during static-fire tests.
82	15 December 2017	15:36	Falcon 9 Full Thrust	1035‑2	SpaceX CRS-13	Success	ISS resupply flight. First launch from SLC-40 following completion of repairs. First flight of a reused booster from SLC-40.
83	8 January 2018	01:00	Falcon 9 Block 4	1043‑1	Zuma	Success	Classified payload for the NRO. Also known as USA-280. First Falcon 9 Block 4 launch from SLC-40.
84	31 January 2018	21:25	Falcon 9 Full Thrust	1032‑2	GovSat-1	Success	Final Falcon 9 Full Thrust flight from Cape Canaveral. Booster expended via water landing.
85	6 March 2018	05:33	Falcon 9 Block 4	1044	Hispasat 30W-6	Success	Booster expended via water landing.
86	2 April 2018	20:30	Falcon 9 Block 4	1039‑2	SpaceX CRS-14	Success	ISS resupply flight. Only Dragon flight on Falcon 9 Block 4. Booster expended.
87	18 April 2018	22:51	Falcon 9 Block 4	1045‑1	TESS	Success	Part of the Explorer program, designed to search for exoplanets using the transit method. First Falcon 9 flight by another celestial body, as spacecraft used a gravity assist at the Moon.
88	4 June 2018	04:45	Falcon 9 Block 4	1040‑2	SES-12	Success	Booster expended.
89	29 June 2018	09:42	Falcon 9 Block 4	1045‑2	SpaceX CRS-15	Success	ISS resupply flight. Final flight of Falcon 9 Block 4. Booster expended.
90	22 July 2018	05:50	Falcon 9 Block 5	1047‑1	Telstar 19V	Success	First launch of Falcon 9 Block 5 from SLC-40.
91	7 August 2018	05:18	Falcon 9 Block 5	1046‑2	Telkom-4 (Merah Putih)	Success	
92	10 September 2018	04:45	Falcon 9 Block 5	1049‑1	Telstar 18V	Success	
93	5 December 2018	18:16	Falcon 9 Block 5	1050	SpaceX CRS-16	Success	ISS resupply flight. First Dragon flight on Falcon 9 Block 5.
94	23 December 2018	13:51	Falcon 9 Block 5	1054	GPS III-1	Success	Part of the Global Positioning System. First launch of GPS Block III. First GPS launch for SpaceX and first GPS launch from SLC-40. Booster expended.
95	22 February 2019	01:45	Falcon 9 Block 5	1048‑3	Nusantara Satu and Beresheet	Success	Beresheet operated by SpaceIL, originally a finalist for the Google Lunar X Prize. First attempted private lunar landing, but gyroscope failure led to premature main engine cutoff and crashed. First Falcon 9 launch to two different destinations and first Falcon 9 launch to another celestial body.
96	4 May 2019	06:48	Falcon 9 Block 5	1056‑1	SpaceX CRS-17	Success	ISS resupply flight. Launched and delivered the Orbiting Carbon Observatory-3.
97	24 May 2019	02:30	Falcon 9 Block 5	1049‑2	Starlink 1	Success	First test launch of the Starlink megaconstellation.
98	25 July 2019	22:02	Falcon 9 Block 5	1056‑2	SpaceX CRS-18	Success	ISS resupply flight. Launched and delivered IDA-3.
99	6 August 2019	23:23	Falcon 9 Block 5	1047‑2	AMOS 17	Success	Free makeup flight for Spacecom following the loss of AMOS 6. Booster expended.
100	11 November 2019	14:56	Falcon 9 Block 5	1048‑4	Starlink 1 (v1.0)	Success	First operational launch of the Starlink megaconstellation.
101	5 December 2019	17:29	Falcon 9 Block 5	1059‑1	SpaceX CRS-19	Success	ISS resupply flight.
102	17 December 2019	00:10	Falcon 9 Block 5	1056‑2	JCSAT-18 / Kacific 1	Success	
103	7 January 2020	02:19	Falcon 9 Block 5	1049‑4	Starlink 2 (v1.0)	Success	
104	29 January 2020	14:06	Falcon 9 Block 5	1051‑3	Starlink 3 (v1.0)	Success	
105	17 February 2020	15:05	Falcon 9 Block 5	1056‑4	Starlink 4 (v1.0)	Success	
106	7 March 2020	04:50	Falcon 9 Block 5	1059‑2	SpaceX CRS-20	Success	ISS resupply flight. Final flight of Dragon 1.
107	4 June 2020	01:25	Falcon 9 Block 5	1049‑5	Starlink 7 (v1.0)	Success	
108	13 June 2020	09:21	Falcon 9 Block 5	1059‑3	Starlink 8 (v1.0) / SkySat 16–18	Success	
109	30 June 2020	20:10	Falcon 9 Block 5	1060‑1	GPS III-3	Success	Part of the Global Positioning System.
110	20 July 2020	21:30	Falcon 9 Block 5	1058‑2	Anasis-II	Success	
111	18 August 2020	14:31	Falcon 9 Block 5	1049‑6	Starlink 10 (v1.0) / SkySat 19–21	Success	
112	30 August 2020	23:19	Falcon 9 Block 5	1059‑4	SAOCOM 1B / GNOMES 1 / Tyvak 0172	Success	First flight from Cape Canaveral to go into polar orbit since 1969 and first polar launch from SLC-40.
113	24 October 2020	15:31	Falcon 9 Block 5	1060‑3	Starlink 14 (v1.0)	Success	
114	5 November 2020	23:24	Falcon 9 Block 5	1062‑1	GPS III-4	Success	Part of the Global Positioning System.
115	25 November 2020	02:13	Falcon 9 Block 5	1049‑7	Starlink 15 (v1.0)	Success	100th Falcon 9 flight.
116	13 December 2020	17:30	Falcon 9 Block 5	1051‑7	SXM-7	Success	
117	8 January 2021	02:15	Falcon 9 Block 5	1060‑4	Türksat 5A	Success	
118	24 January 2021	15:00	Falcon 9 Block 5	1058‑5	Transporter-1	Success	First flight of SpaceX's Transporter program for rideshare satellites.
119	4 February 2021	06:19	Falcon 9 Block 5	1060‑5	Starlink V1.0-L18	Success	
120	15 February 2021	03:59	Falcon 9 Block 5	1059‑6	Starlink V1.0-L19	Success	
121	11 March 2021	08:13	Falcon 9 Block 5	1058‑6	Starlink V1.0-L20	Success	
122	24 March 2021	08:28	Falcon 9 Block 5	1060‑6	Starlink V1.0-L22	Success	
123	7 April 2021	16:34	Falcon 9 Block 5	1058‑7	Starlink V1.0-L23	Success	
124	29 April 2021	03:44	Falcon 9 Block 5	1060‑7	Starlink V1.0-L24	Success	
125	9 May 2021	07:42	Falcon 9 Block 5	1051‑10	Starlink V1.0-L27	Success	
126	26 May 2021	18:59	Falcon 9 Block 5	1063‑2	Starlink V1.0-L28	Success	
127	6 June 2021	04:26	Falcon 9 Block 5	1061‑3	SXM-8	Success	
128	17 June 2021	16:09	Falcon 9 Block 5	1062‑2	GPS III-5	Success	Part of the Global Positioning System.
129	30 June 2021	19:31	Falcon 9 Block 5	1060‑8	Transporter-2	Success	
130	13 November 2021	12:19	Falcon 9 Block 5	1058‑9	Starlink Group 4‑1	Success	
131	2 December 2021	23:12	Falcon 9 Block 5	1060‑9	Starlink Group 4‑3	Success	
132	19 December 2021	03:58	Falcon 9 Block 5	1067‑3	Türksat 5B	Success	
133	13 January 2022	15:25	Falcon 9 Block 5	1058‑10	Transporter-3	Success	
134	31 January 2022	23:11	Falcon 9 Block 5	1052‑3	CSG-2	Success	
135	21 February 2022	14:44	Falcon 9 Block 5	1058‑11	Starlink Group 4‑8	Success	
136	9 March 2022	13:45	Falcon 9 Block 5	1052‑4	Starlink Group 4‑10	Success	
137	19 March 2022	04:22	Falcon 9 Block 5	1051‑12	Starlink Group 4‑12	Success	
138	1 April 2022	12:47	Falcon 9 Block 5	1061‑7	Transporter-4	Success	
139	21 April 2022	17:51	Falcon 9 Block 5	1060‑12	Starlink Group 4‑14	Success	
140	29 April 2022	21:27	Falcon 9 Block 5	1062‑6	Starlink Group 4‑16	Success	
141	14 May 2022	20:40	Falcon 9 Block 5	1073‑1	Starlink Group 4‑15	Success	
142	25 May 2022	18:35	Falcon 9 Block 5	1061‑8	Transporter-5	Success	
143	8 June 2022	21:04	Falcon 9 Block 5	1062‑7	Nilesat-301	Success	
144	19 June 2022	04:27	Falcon 9 Block 5	1061‑9	Globalstar FM15	Success	
145	29 June 2022	21:04	Falcon 9 Block 5	1073‑2	SES-22	Success	
146	7 July 2022	13:11	Falcon 9 Block 5	1058‑13	Starlink Group 4-21	Success	
147	17 July 2022	14:20	Falcon 9 Block 5	1051‑13	Starlink Group 4-22	Success	
148	4 August 2022	23:08	Falcon 9 Block 5	1052‑6	KPLO	Success	Also known as Danuri, and placed on a low-energy ballistic Lunar transfer. Made South Korea the sixth nation to put a satellite into Lunar orbit.
149	19 August 2022	19:21	Falcon 9 Block 5	1062‑9	Starlink Group 4-27	Success	
150	28 August 2022	03:41	Falcon 9 Block 5	1069‑2	Starlink Group 4-23	Success	
151	5 September 2022	02:09	Falcon 9 Block 5	1052‑7	Starlink Group 4-20	Success	
152	19 September 2022	00:18	Falcon 9 Block 5	1067‑6	Starlink Group 4-34	Success	
153	24 September 2022	23:32	Falcon 9 Block 5	1073‑4	Starlink Group 4-35	Success	
154	8 October 2022	23:05	Falcon 9 Block 5	1060‑14	Galaxy 33 & 34	Success	
155	15 October 2022	05:22	Falcon 9 Block 5	1069‑3	Hotbird 13F	Success	
156	30 October 2022	14:50	Falcon 9 Block 5	1062‑10	Starlink Group 4-36	Success	
157	3 November 2022	05:22	Falcon 9 Block 5	1067‑7	Hotbird 13G	Success	
158	12 November 2022	16:06	Falcon 9 Block 5	1051‑14	Galaxy 31 & 32	Success	
159	23 November 2022	02:57	Falcon 9 Block 5	1049‑11	Eutelsat 10B	Success	
160	11 December 2022	07:38	Falcon 9 Block 5	1073‑5	Hakuto-R Mission 1	Success	Private Lunar landing attempt operated by ispace. Error with radar altimeter caused spacecraft to hover overhead until fuel depletion, causing it to crash.
161	16 December 2022	22:48	Falcon 9 Block 5	1067‑8	O3b mPOWER 1 & 2	Success	
162	28 December 2022	09:34	Falcon 9 Block 5	1062‑11	Starlink Group 5‑1	Success	
163	3 January 2023	14:56	Falcon 9 Block 5	1060‑15	Transporter-6	Success	
164	10 January 2023	04:50	Falcon 9 Block 5	1076‑2	OneWeb L16	Success	
165	18 January 2023	12:24	Falcon 9 Block 5	1077‑2	GPS III-6	Success	Part of the Global Positioning System.
166	26 January 2023	09:32	Falcon 9 Block 5	1067‑9	Starlink Group 5‑2	Success	
167	7 February 2023	01:32	Falcon 9 Block 5	1073‑6	Amazonas Nexus	Success	
168	12 February 2023	05:10	Falcon 9 Block 5	1062‑12	Starlink Group 5‑4	Success	
169	18 February 2023	03:59	Falcon 9 Block 5	1077‑3	Inmarsat-6 F2	Success	
170	27 February 2023	23:13	Falcon 9 Block 5	1076‑3	Starlink Group 6‑1	Success	
171	9 March 2023	19:13	Falcon 9 Block 5	1062‑13	OneWeb L17	Success	
172	17 March 2023	23:38	Falcon 9 Block 5	1069‑6	SES-18 & SES-19	Success	
173	24 March 2023	15:43	Falcon 9 Block 5	1067‑10	Starlink Group 5‑5	Success	
174	29 March 2023	20:01	Falcon 9 Block 5	1077‑4	Starlink Group 5‑10	Success	
175	7 April 2023	04:30	Falcon 9 Block 5	1076‑4	Intelsat 40e	Success	Satellite included the TEMPO experiment.
176	19 April 2023	14:31	Falcon 9 Block 5	1073‑8	Starlink Group 6‑2	Success	
177	28 April 2023	22:12	Falcon 9 Block 5	1078‑2	O3b mPOWER 3 & 4	Success	
178	4 May 2023	07:31	Falcon 9 Block 5	1069‑7	Starlink Group 5‑6	Success	
179	14 May 2023	05:03	Falcon 9 Block 5	1067‑11	Starlink Group 5‑9	Success	
180	19 May 2023	06:19	Falcon 9 Block 5	1076‑5	Starlink Group 6‑3	Success	
181	27 May 2023	04:30	Falcon 9 Block 5	1062‑14	Arabsat 7B (Badr 8)	Success	
182	4 June 2023	12:20	Falcon 9 Block 5	1078‑3	Starlink Group 6‑4	Success	
183	12 June 2023	07:10	Falcon 9 Block 5	1073‑9	Starlink Group 5‑11	Success	
184	18 June 2023	22:21	Falcon 9 Block 5	1067‑12	Satria	Success	
185	23 June 2023	15:35	Falcon 9 Block 5	1069‑8	Starlink Group 5‑12	Success	
186	1 July 2023	15:12	Falcon 9 Block 5	1080‑2	Euclid	Success	Part of the Cosmic Vision program, aimed at surveying redshift in galaxies to better understand dark matter and dark energy. Originally planned to launch on Soyuz, but moved to Falcon 9 following the Russian Invasion of Ukraine. First dedicated ESA launch from Falcon 9.
187	10 July 2023	03:58	Falcon 9 Block 5	1058‑16	Starlink Group 6‑5	Success	
188	16 July 2023	03:50	Falcon 9 Block 5	1060‑16	Starlink Group 5‑15	Success	
189	24 July 2023	00:50	Falcon 9 Block 5	1076‑6	Starlink Group 6‑6	Success	
190	28 July 2023	04:01	Falcon 9 Block 5	1062‑15	Starlink Group 6‑7	Success	
191	3 August 2023	05:00	Falcon 9 Block 5	1077‑6	Galaxy 37	Success	
192	7 August 2023	02:41	Falcon 9 Block 5	1078‑4	Starlink Group 6‑8	Success	
193	11 August 2023	05:17	Falcon 9 Block 5	1069‑9	Starlink Group 6‑9	Success	
194	17 August 2023	03:36	Falcon 9 Block 5	1067‑13	Starlink Group 6‑10	Success	
195	27 August 2023	01:05	Falcon 9 Block 5	1080‑3	Starlink Group 6‑11	Success	
196	1 September 2023	02:21	Falcon 9 Block 5	1077‑7	Starlink Group 6‑13	Success	
197	9 September 2023	03:12	Falcon 9 Block 5	1076‑7	Starlink Group 6‑14	Success	
198	16 September 2023	03:38	Falcon 9 Block 5	1078‑5	Starlink Group 6‑16	Success	
199	20 September 2023	03:38	Falcon 9 Block 5	1058‑17	Starlink Group 6‑17	Success	
200	24 September 2023	03:38	Falcon 9 Block 5	1060‑17	Starlink Group 6‑18	Success	
201	30 September 2023	02:00	Falcon 9 Block 5	1069‑10	Starlink Group 6‑19	Success	
202	5 October 2023	05:36	Falcon 9 Block 5	1076‑8	Starlink Group 6‑21	Success	
203	13 October 2023	23:01	Falcon 9 Block 5	1067‑14	Starlink Group 6‑22	Success	
204	18 October 2023	00:39	Falcon 9 Block 5	1062‑16	Starlink Group 6‑23	Success	
205	22 October 2023	02:17	Falcon 9 Block 5	1080‑4	Starlink Group 6‑24	Success	
206	30 October 2023	23:20	Falcon 9 Block 5	1077‑8	Starlink Group 6‑25	Success	
207	4 November 2023	00:37	Falcon 9 Block 5	1058‑18	Starlink Group 6‑26	Success	
208	8 November 2023	05:05	Falcon 9 Block 5	1073‑11	Starlink Group 6‑27	Success	
209	12 November 2023	21:08	Falcon 9 Block 5	1076‑9	O3b mPOWER 5 & 6	Success	
210	18 November 2023	05:05	Falcon 9 Block 5	1069‑11	Starlink Group 6‑28	Success	
211	22 November 2023	07:47	Falcon 9 Block 5	1067‑15	Starlink Group 6‑29	Success	
212	28 November 2023	04:20	Falcon 9 Block 5	1062‑17	Starlink Group 6‑30	Success	
213	3 December 2023	04:00	Falcon 9 Block 5	1078‑6	Starlink Group 6‑31	Success	
214	7 December 2023	05:07	Falcon 9 Block 5	1077‑9	Starlink Group 6‑33	Success	
215	19 December 2023	04:01	Falcon 9 Block 5	1081‑3	Starlink Group 6‑34	Success	
216	23 December 2023	05:33	Falcon 9 Block 5	1058‑19	Starlink Group 6‑32	Success	
217	29 December 2023	04:01	Falcon 9 Block 5	1069‑12	Starlink Group 6‑36	Success	

==== Falcon 9 (2024–25) ====
All flights operated by SpaceX.

No.	Date	Time (UTC)	Launch vehicle	Booster flight	Payload/mission	Result	Remarks
218	3 January 2024	23:04	Falcon 9 Block 5	1076‑10	Ovzon-3	Success	
219	7 January 2024	22:35	Falcon 9 Block 5	1067‑16	Starlink Group 6‑35	Success	
220	15 January 2024	01:52	Falcon 9 Block 5	1073‑12	Starlink Group 6‑37	Success	
221	30 January 2024	17:07	Falcon 9 Block 5	1077‑10	Cygnus CRS NG-20	Success	ISS resupply flight. First of five Cygnus flights on Falcon 9, thanks to Northrop Grumman's Antares being affected by the Russian Invasion of Ukraine.
222	8 February 2024	06:33	Falcon 9 Block 5	1081‑4	PACE	Success	Part of the Large Strategic Science Missions, aimed to study Earth's ocean color, biogeochemistry, and ecology.
223	14 February 2024	22:30	Falcon 9 Block 5	1078‑7	USSF-124	Success	Launch for the United States Space Force. Two HBTSS satellites.
224	20 February 2024	20:11	Falcon 9 Block 5	1067‑17	Telkomsat HTS 113BT	Success	
225	25 February 2024	22:06	Falcon 9 Block 5	1069‑13	Starlink Group 6‑39	Success	
226	29 February 2024	15:30	Falcon 9 Block 5	1076‑11	Starlink Group 6‑40	Success	
227	4 March 2024	23:56	Falcon 9 Block 5	1073‑13	Starlink Group 6‑41	Success	
228	10 March 2024	23:05	Falcon 9 Block 5	1077‑11	Starlink Group 6‑43	Success	
229	21 March 2024	20:55	Falcon 9 Block 5	1080‑6	SpaceX CRS-30	Success	ISS resupply flight. First Cargo Dragon 2 flight from SLC-40, and first use of pad's launch tower.
230	25 March 2024	23:42	Falcon 9 Block 5	1078‑8	Starlink Group 6‑46	Success	
231	31 March 2024	01:30	Falcon 9 Block 5	1067‑18	Starlink Group 6‑45	Success	
232	5 April 2024	09:12	Falcon 9 Block 5	1069‑14	Starlink Group 6‑47	Success	
233	10 April 2024	05:40	Falcon 9 Block 5	1083‑2	Starlink Group 6‑48	Success	
234	13 April 2024	01:40	Falcon 9 Block 5	1062‑20	Starlink Group 6‑49	Success	
235	18 April 2024	22:40	Falcon 9 Block 5	1080‑7	Starlink Group 6‑52	Success	
236	23 April 2024	22:17	Falcon 9 Block 5	1078‑9	Starlink Group 6‑53	Success	
237	28 April 2024	22:08	Falcon 9 Block 5	1076‑13	Starlink Group 6‑54	Success	
238	3 May 2024	02:37	Falcon 9 Block 5	1067‑19	Starlink Group 6‑55	Success	
239	6 May 2024	18:14	Falcon 9 Block 5	1069‑15	Starlink Group 6‑57	Success	
240	13 May 2024	00:53	Falcon 9 Block 5	1073‑15	Starlink Group 6‑58	Success	
241	18 May 2024	00:32	Falcon 9 Block 5	1062‑21	Starlink Group 6‑59	Success	
242	23 May 2024	02:35	Falcon 9 Block 5	1080‑8	Starlink Group 6‑62	Success	
243	28 May 2024	14:24	Falcon 9 Block 5	1078‑10	Starlink Group 6‑60	Success	
244	1 June 2024	02:37	Falcon 9 Block 5	1076‑14	Starlink Group 6‑64	Success	
245	5 June 2024	02:16	Falcon 9 Block 5	1067‑20	Starlink Group 8‑5	Success	
246	8 June 2024	01:56	Falcon 9 Block 5	1069‑16	Starlink Group 10‑1	Success	
247	20 June 2024	21:35	Falcon 9 Block 5	1080‑9	Astra 1P/SES-24	Success	
248	23 June 2024	17:15	Falcon 9 Block 5	1078‑11	Starlink Group 10‑2	Success	
249	27 June 2024	11:14	Falcon 9 Block 5	1062‑22	Starlink Group 10‑3	Success	
250	3 July 2024	08:55	Falcon 9 Block 5	1073‑16	Starlink Group 8‑9	Success	
251	8 July 2024	23:30	Falcon 9 Block 5	1076‑15	Türksat 6A	Success	
252	28 July 2024	05:09	Falcon 9 Block 5	1077‑14	Starlink Group 10‑4	Success	
253	4 August 2024	15:02	Falcon 9 Block 5	1080‑10	Cygnus CRS NG-21	Success	ISS resupply flight. Second of five Cygnus flights on Falcon 9.
254	10 August 2024	12:50	Falcon 9 Block 5	1067‑21	Starlink Group 8‑3	Success	
255	15 August 2024	13:00	Falcon 9 Block 5	1076‑16	WorldView Legion 3–4	Success	
256	20 August 2024	13:20	Falcon 9 Block 5	1085‑1	Starlink Group 10‑5	Success	
257	28 August 2024	07:48	Falcon 9 Block 5	1062‑23	Starlink Group 8‑6	Success	
258	31 August 2024	07:43	Falcon 9 Block 5	1069‑18	Starlink Group 8‑10	Success	
259	5 September 2024	14:33	Falcon 9 Block 5	1077‑15	Starlink Group 8‑11	Success	
260	12 September 2024	08:52	Falcon 9 Block 5	1078‑13	BlueBird Block 1 #1-5	Success	
261	17 September 2024	22:50	Falcon 9 Block 5	1067‑22	Galileo-L13 (FOC FM26 & FM32)	Success	Part of the Galileo satellite navigation system. Originally supposed to launch on Soyuz, but was moved to Falcon 9 following the Russian Invasion of Ukraine. First Galileo launch from SLC-40.
262	28 September 2024	17:17	Falcon 9 Block 5	1085‑2	SpaceX Crew-9 (Dragon Freedom)	Success	ISS crew rotation mission. First Crew Dragon flight from SLC-40 and crewed flight from SLC-40, carrying astronaut Nick Hague and cosmonaut Aleksandr Gorbunov to the ISS. Originally planned to carry four astronauts, but two seats were made open following Boeing CFT astronauts Barry Wilmore and Sunita Williams' reassignment to the ISS expedition crew.
263	7 October 2024	14:52	Falcon 9 Block 5	1061‑23	Hera	Success	Second and final of NASA and ESA's Asteroid Impact and Deflection Assessment missions, aimed at demonstrating and studying impacting for asteroid defense at 65803 Didymos. Compliments the 2021 launch of DART. First Falcon 9 launch to another planet. Flew while Falcon 9 was grounded following an off-nominal deorbit burn during SpaceX Crew-9, but was waived due to heliocentric trajectory. Booster expended.
264	15 October 2024	16:10	Falcon 9 Block 5	1080‑11	Starlink Group 10‑10	Success	
265	18 October 2024	23:31	Falcon 9 Block 5	1076‑17	Starlink Group 8‑19	Success	
266	23 October 2024	21:47	Falcon 9 Block 5	1073‑18	Starlink Group 6‑61	Success	
267	26 October 2024	21:47	Falcon 9 Block 5	1069‑19	Starlink Group 10‑8	Success	
268	30 October 2024	21:10	Falcon 9 Block 5	1078‑14	Starlink Group 10‑13	Success	
269	7 November 2024	20:19	Falcon 9 Block 5	1085‑3	Starlink Group 6‑77	Success	
270	11 November 2024	21:28	Falcon 9 Block 5	1080‑12	Starlink Group 6‑69	Success	
271	14 November 2024	13:21	Falcon 9 Block 5	1076‑18	Starlink Group 6‑68	Success	
272	18 November 2024	18:31	Falcon 9 Block 5	1073‑19	GSAT-20 (GSAT-N2)	Success	
273	21 November 2024	16:07	Falcon 9 Block 5	1069‑20	Starlink Group 6‑66	Success	
274	25 November 2024	10:02	Falcon 9 Block 5	1080‑13	Starlink Group 12‑1	Success	
275	30 November 2024	05:00	Falcon 9 Block 5	1083‑6	Starlink Group 6‑65	Success	
276	4 December 2024	10:13	Falcon 9 Block 5	1067‑24	Starlink Group 6‑70	Success	
277	8 December 2024	05:12	Falcon 9 Block 5	1086‑2	Starlink Group 12‑5	Success	
278	17 December 2024	00:52	Falcon 9 Block 5	1085‑4	GPS III-7	Success	Part of the Global Positioning System.
279	29 December 2024	05:00	Falcon 9 Block 5	1083‑7	Astranis: From One to Many	Success	
280	4 January 2025	01:27	Falcon 9 Block 5	1073‑20	Thuraya 4-NGS	Success	
281	6 January 2025	20:43	Falcon 9 Block 5	1077‑17	Starlink Group 6‑71	Success	
282	10 January 2025	19:11	Falcon 9 Block 5	1067‑25	Starlink Group 12‑12	Success	
283	13 January 2025	16:47	Falcon 9 Block 5	1080‑15	Starlink Group 12‑4	Success	
284	27 January 2025	22:05	Falcon 9 Block 5	1076‑20	Starlink Group 12‑7	Success	
285	4 February 2025	10:15	Falcon 9 Block 5	1069‑21	Starlink Group 12‑3	Success	
286	8 February 2025	19:18	Falcon 9 Block 5	1078‑17	Starlink Group 12‑9	Success	
287	11 February 2025	18:53	Falcon 9 Block 5	1077‑18	Starlink Group 12‑18	Success	
288	15 February 2025	01:14	Falcon 9 Block 5	1067‑26	Starlink Group 12‑8	Success	
289	18 February 2025	23:21	Falcon 9 Block 5	1080‑16	Starlink Group 10‑12	Success	First booster landing performed in waters of a foreign nation, landing in the Bahamas.
290	21 February 2025	15:19	Falcon 9 Block 5	1076‑21	Starlink Group 12‑14	Success	
291	27 February 2025	03:34	Falcon 9 Block 5	1092‑1	Starlink Group 12‑13	Success	
292	3 March 2025	02:24	Falcon 9 Block 5	1086‑5	Starlink Group 12‑20	Success	
293	13 March 2025	02:35	Falcon 9 Block 5	1069‑22	Starlink Group 12‑21	Success	
294	15 March 2025	11:35	Falcon 9 Block 5	1081‑13	Starlink Group 12‑16	Success	
295	28 March 2025	19:57	Falcon 9 Block 5	1077‑19	Starlink Group 12‑25	Success	
296	24 March 2025	17:48	Falcon 9 Block 5	1092‑2	NROL-69	Success	NRO launch. Two Naval Ocean Surveillance System satellites, both known as USA-498.
297	31 March 2025	19:52	Falcon 9 Block 5	1080‑17	Starlink Group 6‑80	Success	
298	6 April 2025	03:07	Falcon 9 Block 5	1078‑19	Starlink Group 6‑72	Success	
299	14 April 2025	04:00	Falcon 9 Block 5	1067‑27	Starlink Group 6‑73	Success	
300	22 April 2025	00:48	Falcon 9 Block 5	1090‑3	Bandwagon-3	Success	
301	25 April 2025	01:52	Falcon 9 Block 5	1069‑23	Starlink Group 6‑74	Success	
302	28 April 2025	02:09	Falcon 9 Block 5	1077‑20	Starlink Group 12‑23	Success	
303	2 May 2025	01:51	Falcon 9 Block 5	1080‑18	Starlink Group 6‑75	Success	
304	7 May 2025	01:17	Falcon 9 Block 5	1085‑7	Starlink Group 6‑93	Success	
305	10 May 2025	06:28	Falcon 9 Block 5	1083‑11	Starlink Group 6‑91	Success	
306	14 May 2025	16:38	Falcon 9 Block 5	1090‑4	Starlink Group 6‑67	Success	
307	21 May 2025	03:19	Falcon 9 Block 5	1095‑1	Starlink Group 12‑15	Success	
308	24 May 2025	17:19	Falcon 9 Block 5	1069‑24	Starlink Group 12‑22	Success	
309	30 May 2025	17:37	Falcon 9 Block 5	1092‑4	GPS III-8	Success	Part of the Global Positioning System.
310	3 June 2025	04:43	Falcon 9 Block 5	1077‑21	Starlink Group 12‑19	Success	
311	7 June 2025	04:54	Falcon 9 Block 5	1085‑8	SXM-10	Success	
312	10 June 2025	13:05	Falcon 9 Block 5	1083‑12	Starlink Group 12‑24	Success	
313	13 June 2025	15:29	Falcon 9 Block 5	1078‑21	Starlink Group 12‑26	Success	
314	18 June 2025	05:55	Falcon 9 Block 5	1090‑5	Starlink Group 10‑18	Success	
315	23 June 2025	05:58	Falcon 9 Block 5	1069‑25	Starlink Group 10‑23	Success	
316	25 June 2025	19:54	Falcon 9 Block 5	1080‑20	Starlink Group 10‑16	Success	
317	28 June 2025	04:26	Falcon 9 Block 5	1092‑5	Starlink Group 10‑34	Success	
318	2 July 2025	06:28	Falcon 9 Block 5	1067‑29	Starlink Group 10‑25	Success	500th Falcon 9 launch.
319	8 July 2025	08:21	Falcon 9 Block 5	1077‑22	Starlink Group 10‑28	Success	
320	13 July 2025	05:04	Falcon 9 Block 5	1083‑13	Dror-1	Success	
321	16 July 2025	06:30	Falcon 9 Block 5	1096‑1	KuiperSat KF-01	Success	First of three Falcon 9 launches supporting the Kuiper Systems megaconstellation for Amazon.
322	22 July 2025	21:12	Falcon 9 Block 5	1090‑6	O3b mPOWER 9 & 10	Success	
323	26 July 2025	09:01	Falcon 9 Block 5	1078‑22	Starlink Group 10‑26	Success	
324	30 July 2025	03:37	Falcon 9 Block 5	1069‑26	Starlink Group 10‑29	Success	
325	4 August 2025	07:57	Falcon 9 Block 5	1080‑21	Starlink Group 10‑30	Success	
326	11 August 2025	12:35	Falcon 9 Block 5	1091‑1	KuiperSat KF-02	Success	
327	14 August 2025	12:29	Falcon 9 Block 5	1085‑10	Starlink Group 10‑20	Success	
328	24 August 2025	06:45	Falcon 9 Block 5	1090‑7	SpaceX CRS-33	Success	ISS resupply flight.
329	27 August 2025	11:10	Falcon 9 Block 5	1095‑2	Starlink Group 10‑56	Success	
330	31 August 2025	11:49	Falcon 9 Block 5	1077‑23	Starlink Group 10‑14	Success	
331	3 September 2025	11:56	Falcon 9 Block 5	1083‑14	Starlink Group 10‑22	Success	
332	12 September 2025	01:56	Falcon 9 Block 5	1078‑23	Nusantara Lima	Success	
333	14 September 2025	22:11	Falcon 9 Block 5	1094‑4	Cygnus CRS NG-23	Success	ISS resupply flight. Third of five Cygnus flights on Falcon 9. Originally slated to fly NG-22, but was switched following damage made to spacecraft during shipping. First flight of the XL variation.
334	18 September 2025	09:30	Falcon 9 Block 5	1092‑7	Starlink Group 10‑61	Success	
335	21 September 2025	10:53	Falcon 9 Block 5	1085‑11	Starlink Group 10‑27	Success	
336	25 September 2025	08:39	Falcon 9 Block 5	1080‑22	Starlink Group 10‑15	Success	
337	7 October 2025	06:46	Falcon 9 Block 5	1090‑8	Starlink Group 10‑59	Success	
338	14 October 2025	01:58	Falcon 9 Block 5	1091‑2	KuiperSat KF-03	Success	Final Kuiper launch prior to its renaming to Amazon Leo.
339	16 October 2025	09:27	Falcon 9 Block 5	1095‑3	Starlink Group 10‑52	Success	
340	19 October 2025	17:39	Falcon 9 Block 5	1067‑31	Starlink Group 10‑17	Success	
341	24 October 2025	01:30	Falcon 9 Block 5	1076‑22	Spainsat NG II	Success	Booster expended.
342	26 October 2025	15:00	Falcon 9 Block 5	1077‑24	Starlink Group 10‑21	Success	
343	29 October 2025	16:35	Falcon 9 Block 5	1083‑15	Starlink Group 10‑37	Success	
344	2 November 2025	05:09	Falcon 9 Block 5	1091‑3	Bandwagon-4	Success	
345	6 November 2025	01:31	Falcon 9 Block 5	1094‑5	Starlink Group 6‑81	Success	
346	11 November 2025	03:21	Falcon 9 Block 5	1096‑3	Starlink Group 6‑87	Success	
347	15 November 2025	06:44	Falcon 9 Block 5	1078‑24	Starlink Group 6‑85	Success	
348	19 November 2025	00:12	Falcon 9 Block 5	1085‑12	Starlink Group 6‑94	Success	
349	22 November 2025	07:53	Falcon 9 Block 5	1090‑9	Starlink Group 6‑79	Success	
350	2 December 2025	22:18	Falcon 9 Block 5	1077‑25	Starlink Group 6‑95	Success	
351	9 December 2025	19:16	Falcon 9 Block 5	1096‑4	NROL-77	Success	NRO launch. Naval Ocean Surveillance System satellite, also known as USA-570.
352	11 December 2025	22:01	Falcon 9 Block 5	1083‑16	Starlink Group 6–90	Success	
353	15 December 2025	05:25	Falcon 9 Block 5	1092‑9	Starlink Group 6–82	Success	

==== Falcon 9 (2026) ====
All flights operated by SpaceX.

No.	Date	Time (UTC)	Launch vehicle	Booster flight	Payload/mission	Result	Remarks
354	4 January 2026	06:48	Falcon 9 Block 5	1101‑1	Starlink Group 6–88	Success	
355	9 January 2026	21:41	Falcon 9 Block 5	1069‑29	Starlink Group 6–96	Success	
356	12 January 2026	21:08	Falcon 9 Block 5	1078‑25	Starlink Group 6–97	Success	
357	14 January 2026	18:08	Falcon 9 Block 5	1085‑13	Starlink Group 6–98	Success	
358	18 January 2026	23:31	Falcon 9 Block 5	1080‑24	Starlink Group 6–100	Success	
359	28 January 2025	04:53	Falcon 9 Block 5	1096‑5	GPS III-9	Success	Part of the Global Positioning System.
360	30 January 2026	07:22	Falcon 9 Block 5	1095‑5	Starlink Group 6–101	Success	
361	13 February 2026	10:15	Falcon 9 Block 5	1101‑2	SpaceX Crew-12 (Dragon Freedom)	Success	ISS crew rotation mission. First booster landing at Landing Zone 40.
362	16 February 2026	07:59	Falcon 9 Block 5	1090‑10	Starlink Group 6–103	Success	
363	20 February 2026	01:41	Falcon 9 Block 5	1077‑26	Starlink Group 10–36	Success	
364	22 February 2026	03:47	Falcon 9 Block 5	1067‑33	Starlink Group 6–104	Success	
365	24 February 2026	23:04	Falcon 9 Block 5	1092‑10	Starlink Group 6–110	Success	
366	27 February 2026	12:16	Falcon 9 Block 5	1069‑30	Starlink Group 6–108	Success	
367	2 March 2026	02:56	Falcon 9 Block 5	1078‑26	Starlink Group 10–41	Success	
368	4 March 2026	10:52	Falcon 9 Block 5	1080‑25	Starlink Group 10–40	Success	
369	10 March 2026	04:19	Falcon 9 Block 5	1085‑14	EchoStar XXV	Success	
370	14 March 2026	12:37	Falcon 9 Block 5	1095‑6	Starlink Group 10–48	Success	
371	17 March 2026	13:27	Falcon 9 Block 5	1090‑11	Starlink Group 10–46	Success	
372	19 March 2026	14:20	Falcon 9 Block 5	1077‑27	Starlink Group 10–33	Success	
373	22 March 2026	14:47	Falcon 9 Block 5	1078‑27	Starlink Group 10–62	Success	
374	30 March 2026	21:15	Falcon 9 Block 5	1067‑34	Starlink Group 10–44	Success	
375	2 April 2026	11:55	Falcon 9 Block 5	1085‑15	Starlink Group 10–58	Success	
376	11 April 2026	11:41	Falcon 9 Block 5	1094‑7	Cygnus CRS NG-24	Success	ISS resupply flight. Fourth of five Cygnus flights on Falcon 9.
377	14 April 2026	09:33	Falcon 9 Block 5	1080‑26	Starlink Group 10–24	Success	
378	21 April 2026	06:53	Falcon 9 Block 5	1095‑7	GPS III-10	Success	Part of the Global Positioning System. Final deployment of drone ship Just Read the Instructions.
379	1 May 2026	18:06	Falcon 9 Block 5	1069‑31	Starlink Group 10–38	Success	
380	15 May 2026	22:05	Falcon 9 Block 5	1096‑6	SpaceX CRS-34	Success	ISS resupply flight.
381	21 May 2026	10:04	Falcon 9 Block 5	1077‑28	Starlink Group 10–31	Success	
382	25 May 2026	11:48	Falcon 9 Block 5	1078‑28	Starlink Group 10–47	Success	
383	29 May 2026	12:57	Falcon 9 Block 5	1085‑16	Starlink Group 10–53	Success	
384	4 June 2026	10:26	Falcon 9 Block 5	1090‑12	Starlink Group 10–43	Success	
385	8 June 2026	10:13	Falcon 9 Block 5	1067‑35	Starlink Group 10–35	Success	
386	12 June 2026	12:37	Falcon 9 Block 5	1080‑27	Starlink Group 10–54	Success	Final Falcon 9 launch under SpaceX as a private company, prior to their initial public offering later in the day.
387	17 June 2026	06:39	Falcon 9 Block 5	1077‑29	BlueBird 8 to 10	Success	
388	23 June 2026	10:53	Falcon 9 Block 5	1078‑29	Starfall Demo	Success	
389	29 June 2026	02:25	Falcon 9 Block 5	1085‑17	SXM-11	Success	
390	5 July 2026	10:50	Falcon 9 Block 5	1090‑13	Starlink Group 10–50	Success	
391	9 July 2026	09:25	Falcon 9 Block 5	1067‑36	Starlink Group 10–42	Success	
392	14 July 2026	09:10	Falcon 9 Block 5	1080‑28	Starlink Group 10–45	Success	
393	21 July 2026	21:15	Falcon 9 Block 5	1069‑32	MRV-1	Success	Booster expended.
394	30 July 2026	07:10	Falcon 9 Block 5	1096‑7	NROL-95	Success	NRO launch. NOSS satellite, also known as USA-619.
395	5 August 2026	07:49	Falcon 9 Block 5	1077‑30	BlueBird 11 to 13	Success	
396	11 August 2026	15:58	Falcon 9 Block 5	1085‑18	Starlink Group 10–19	Success	
397	16 August 2026	01:12	Falcon 9 Block 5	1090‑14	Globalstar-2R M104–111 (8 satellites)	Success	
398	21 August 2026	15:14	Falcon 9 Block 5	1078‑30	Starlink Group 10–39	Success	
399	25 August 2026	09:33	Falcon 9 Block 5	1067‑37	Starlink Group 10–49	Success	Final Starlink launch from Falcon 9 in Florida, with all upcoming flights using Starship.
400	13 September 2026	18:49	Falcon 9 Block 5	1080‑29	O3b mPOWER 11, 12 & 13	Success	
401	1 October 2026	15:10	Falcon 9 Block 5	1101-3	SpaceX Crew-13 (Dragon Grace)	Success	ISS crew rotation mission.
402	13 October 2026	10:33	Falcon 9 Block 5	1096‑8	SpaceX CRS-35	Success	ISS resupply flight.
403	20 October 2026	11:04	Falcon 9 Block 5	1085‑19	Bandwagon-5	Success	

==== Upcoming launches ====
Date	Rocket Type	Mission / Payload
29 November 2026	Falcon 9 Block 5	Cygnus CRS NG-25
December 2026	Falcon 9 Block 5	CHORUS
January 2027	Falcon 9 Block 5	Axiom Mission 5

=== LZ-40 ===
- Falcon 9 Success
- Falcon Heavy Success
- Falcon 9 Failure
- Falcon Heavy Failure

==== Falcon booster landings ====
All landings operated by SpaceX.

No.	Date (UTC)	Launch vehicle	Booster flight	Launch site	Payload	Result
1	13 February 2026	Falcon 9 Block 5	1101-2	SLC-40	SpaceX Crew-12	Success
2	11 April 2026	Falcon 9 Block 5	1094-7	SLC-40	Cygnus CRS NG-24	Success
3	29 April 2026	Falcon Heavy	1075-22	LC-39A	ViaSat-3 F3	Success
4	15 May 2026	Falcon 9 Block 5	1096-6	SLC-40	SpaceX CRS-34	Success
5	16 August 2026	Falcon 9 Block 5	1090-14	SLC-40	Globalstar-2R M104–111 (8 satellites)	Success
6	30 August 2026	Falcon Heavy	1104-1	LC-39A	Nancy Grace Roman Space Telescope	Success
7	1 October 2026	Falcon 9 Block 5	1101-3	SLC-40	SpaceX Crew-13	Success
8	13 October 2026	Falcon 9 Block 5	1096-8	SLC-40	SpaceX CRS-35	Success
9	29 November 2026	Falcon 9 Block 5	1096-9	SLC-40	Cygnus CRS NG-25	Planned
