= International Docking System =

International Docking System could mean:

- International Docking System Standard (IDSS), international standard for spacecraft docking systems.
- International Berthing and Docking Mechanism, European androgynous low impact docking mechanism.
