= US Orbital Segment =

US components of the International Space Station

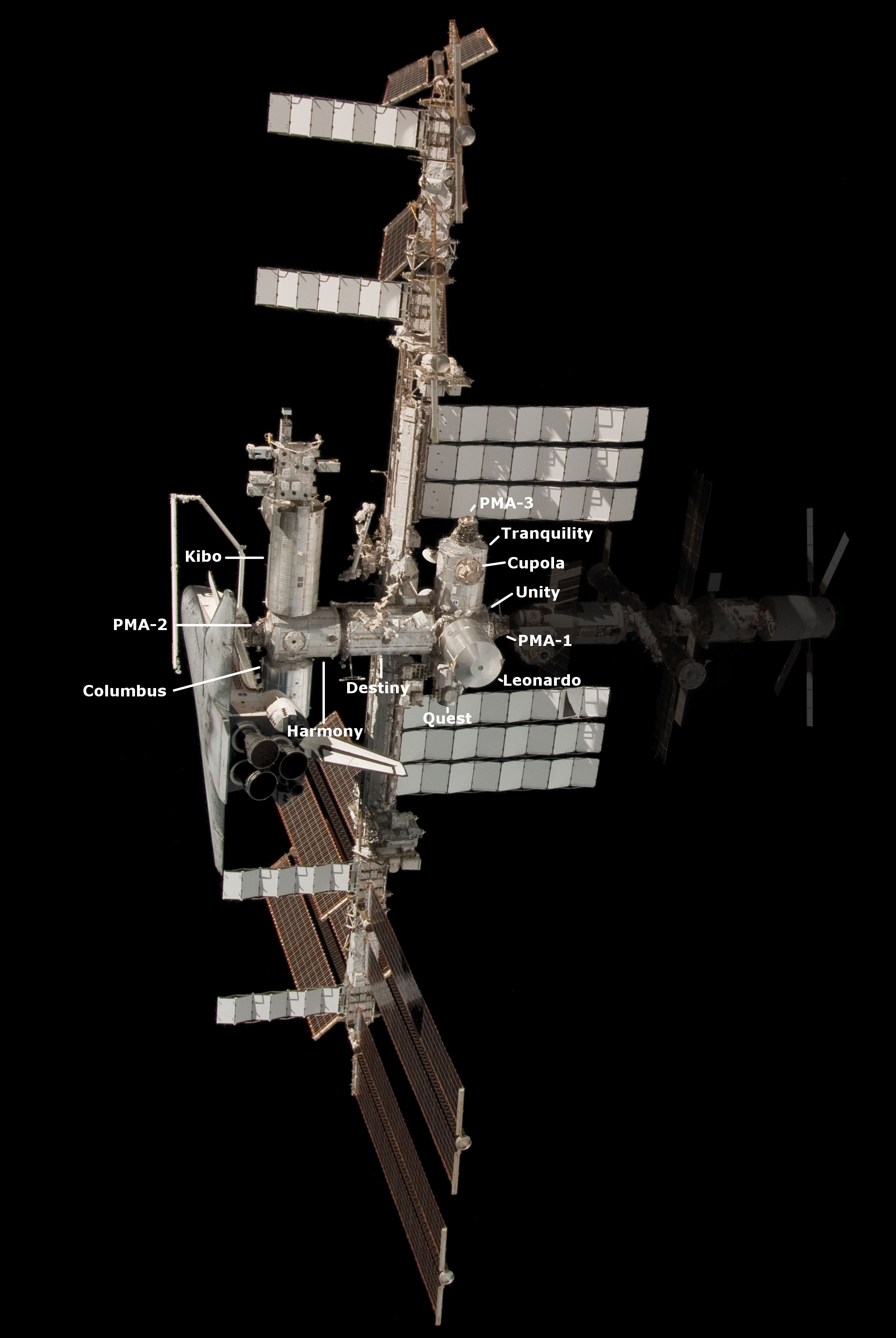
- The US Orbital Segment with Space Shuttle docked. Zarya is also a NASA module but it was manufactured by Russia

Module statistics
- COSPAR ID: 1998-067A
- Part of: International Space Station
- Launch date: December 4, 1998; 27 years ago
- Launch vehicle: Space Shuttle, SpaceX Dragon

The US Orbital Segment (USOS) is the name given to the components of the International Space Station (ISS) constructed and operated by the United States National Aeronautics and Space Administration (NASA), European Space Agency (ESA), Canadian Space Agency (CSA) and Japan Aerospace Exploration Agency (JAXA). The segment consists of eleven pressurized components and various external elements, almost all of which were delivered by the Space Shuttle.

The segment is monitored and controlled from various mission control centers around the world including Johnson Space Center in Houston, Texas, Columbus Control Centre in Oberpfaffenhofen, Germany, and Tsukuba Space Center in Tsukuba, Japan. It depends on the Russian Orbital Segment for essential flight control, orbital station-keeping and life support systems.

== Modules ==
ISS configuration as of December 2022.

The US Orbital Segment consists of 10 pressurized modules. Of these, seven are habitable, and three are connecting nodes with large ports. The ports are used to connect the modules together or provide berths and docks for spacecraft.

=== Nodes ===
Each of the nodes has ports called Common Berthing Mechanisms (CBM). All three nodes have 4 ports around their exterior, and 1 port on each end, 6 ports in total. In addition to the 18 ports on the nodes there are additional ports on the modules, most of these are used for mating modules together, while unused CBM ports can berth one of the re-supply spacecraft MPLM, HTV, Dragon Cargo or Cygnus. There are two PMA adapters that change CBM ports to docking ports, the type used by Soyuz, Progress, Automated Transfer Vehicle, and the former Space Shuttle.

==== Unity ====
The first component of the USOS pressurized segment is the Unity. On the aft end of Unity is the Pressurized Mating Adapter (PMA) 1. The PMA-1 connects Unity with the Russian segment. Unity is also connected to the Quest airlock on the starboard side, Tranquility on the port side, and the Z1 truss on the zenith. The Destiny lab connects to the forward end, leading to the rest of the USOS. Unity is also used by the crews on board the ISS to eat meals and share some downtime together. The Unity node was delivered to the station by STS-88 on December 6, 1998.

==== Harmony ====
The Harmony is the central connecting node of the USOS. Harmony connects to the Destiny lab aft end, Kibo lab to the port side, and Columbus lab to the starboard side. The Harmony node's nadir and zenith ports also serves as the berthing port for H-II Transfer Vehicle (HTV), Dragon and Cygnus resupply vehicles. On the forward end of Harmony is PMA-2, which was used by visiting Space Shuttles as a mating adapter and by future crewed missions to the ISS. On July 18, 2016, aboard SpaceX CRS-9, NASA launched the International Docking Adapter-2, to convert the Shuttle APAS-95 docking adapter to the NASA Docking System, to be used with SpaceX Dragon 2 and Boeing Starliner. Harmony was delivered by the STS-120 mission on October 23, 2007.

==== Tranquility ====
The Tranquility node houses the USOS life support systems. Tranquility also hosts the seven windowed Cupola module and the Leonardo module on its forward port. The forward facing port of Tranquility is blocked by the station's truss structure, while the aft facing port is free for use. While the nadir port is used by the Cupola, the zenith port is used by some exercise equipment inside the node. The starboard port is connected to node 1, and the port side is occupied by the PMA 3, previously a backup for the Shuttle docking, which will receive International Docking Adapter-3 during CRS-18, to allow connection with the Crew Dragon and Boeing Starliner. The Tranquility module was delivered by STS-130 in February 2010, together with the Cupola.

=== Laboratories ===
==== Destiny ====
The Destiny laboratory is the American-built laboratory module. It is used for medical, engineering, biotechnological, physics, materials science and Earth science research. Destiny also houses a back-up robotic work station, and was the first of the USOS laboratories to be delivered. It was delivered by STS-98 on February 7, 2001. The Destiny lab is managed by mission control centers in Houston, Texas and Huntsville, Alabama.

==== Columbus ====
Columbus is a laboratory module built by the European Space Agency. It is host to scientific research in fluids, biology, medicine, materials and Earth sciences. Columbus also has four external payload locations, used to expose experiments to the vacuum of space. The Columbus module was delivered to the ISS by STS-122 on February 7, 2008. The Columbus Control Center, located in Germany, is responsible for the control of the Columbus module.

==== Kibo ====
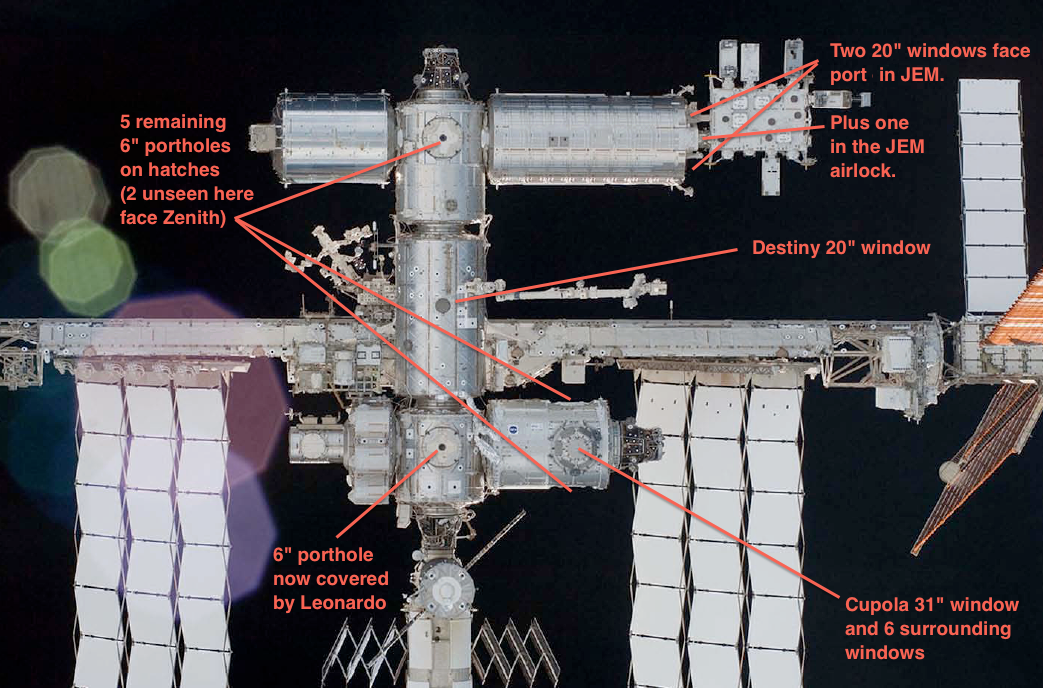
USOS International Space Station window locations

The Kibo laboratory is the Japanese component of the USOS. Kibo has four main parts: the Kibo lab itself, a pressurized cargo container, an exposed science platform and two robotic arms. The module is unique in that it has a small airlock, which can be used to pass payloads to the robotic arms or astronauts outside the station. The robotic arms are controlled from a work station inside the lab. The lab is used for research in medicine, engineering, biotechnology, physics, materials science and Earth science. The logistics container was the first part of Kibo to arrive. It was delivered by STS-123 in March 2008. The Kibo lab itself was delivered to the ISS by the STS-124 mission in May 2008. The exposed facility was brought to the ISS by the STS-127 mission in July 2009. The JEM Mission Control Room in Tsukuba, Japan is responsible for control of all elements of the Kibo laboratory.

=== Other modules ===
==== Quest ====
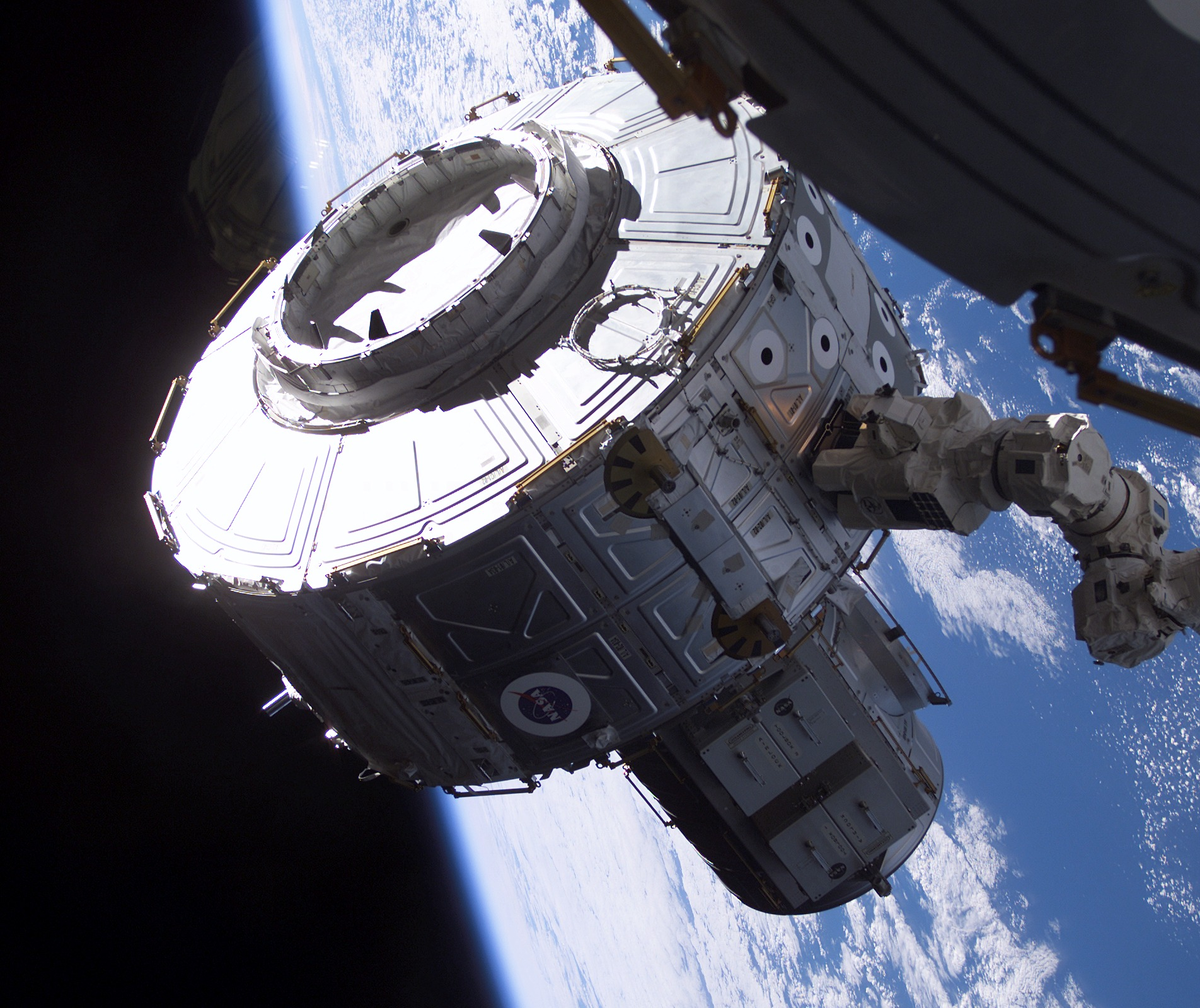
Quest

The Quest Joint Airlock is used to host spacewalks from the USOS segment of the ISS. It consists of two main parts: the equipment lock and the crew lock. The equipment lock is where the Extravehicular Mobility Units are stored and preparations for spacewalks are carried out. The crew lock is depressurized during spacewalks. The Quest airlock was delivered and installed by the STS-104 crew in July 2001.

==== Leonardo ====
The Leonardo module, also known as the Permanent Multipurpose Module (PMM), is a module used for stowage space on the ISS. Leonardo is attached to the forward-facing side of the Tranquility node. The PMM was delivered to the ISS by the STS-133 mission in early 2011. Originally the Multi-Purpose Logistics Module (MPLM) Leonardo, it was converted to stay on orbit for an extended period of time prior to being installed on the ISS.

==== Cupola ====
The Cupola is a seven-windowed module attached to the Tranquillity module. It is used for Earth observation and houses some gym equipment. All of the seven windows have covers that are closed when the windows aren't used, to protect the station from space debris impact. The Cupola was delivered together with the Tranquility node by STS-130 in February 2010.

==== Bigelow Expandable Activity Module ====
The Bigelow Expandable Activity Module (BEAM) is an experimental expandable space station module developed by Bigelow Aerospace under contract with NASA. It was designed for testing as a temporary module on the International Space Station (ISS) beginning in 2016. BEAM arrived at the ISS on April 10, 2016, was berthed to the station on April 16, and was expanded and pressurized on May 28. Originally planned as a two-year test, the module has exceeded expectations and as of 2026, remains in use for additional cargo storage. Following Bigelow Aerospace's suspension of business operations in 2020, ownership of BEAM transferred to NASA.

==== Pressurized Mating Adapter ====
The Pressurized Mating Adapters (PMA) serve as docking ports on the USOS portion of the ISS. It converts the standard Common Berthing Mechanism to APAS-95, the docking system that was used by the Space Shuttle and the Russian Orbital Segment. Currently PMA-1 is used to connect the Unity node with the Zarya module on the ISS. Pressurized Mating Adapter-2 is located on the forward end of Harmony, while PMA-3 is located in the zenith port of the same node. PMA-2 was the main Shuttle docking port, with PMA-3 being its backup, used only a few times. With the new Crew Commercial Program and the retirement of the Shuttle fleet, NASA built the International Docking Adapter, to convert PMA-2 and PMA-3 to the NASA Docking System. IDA-1 was supposed to dock with PMA-2, but was lost in the SpaceX CRS-7 launch failure. Thus IDA-2, which was brought by SpaceX CRS-9 and was supposed to dock to PMA-3, was shifted to PMA-2. IDA-3, the replacement for the lost IDA-1, was launched in July 2019 on SpaceX CRS-18 and was berthed to PMA-3. PMA-1 and PMA-2 were delivered with the Unity node on STS-88 in December 1998. The third PMA was delivered by STS-92 on October 11, 2000.

== External elements ==
=== Integrated Truss Structure ===
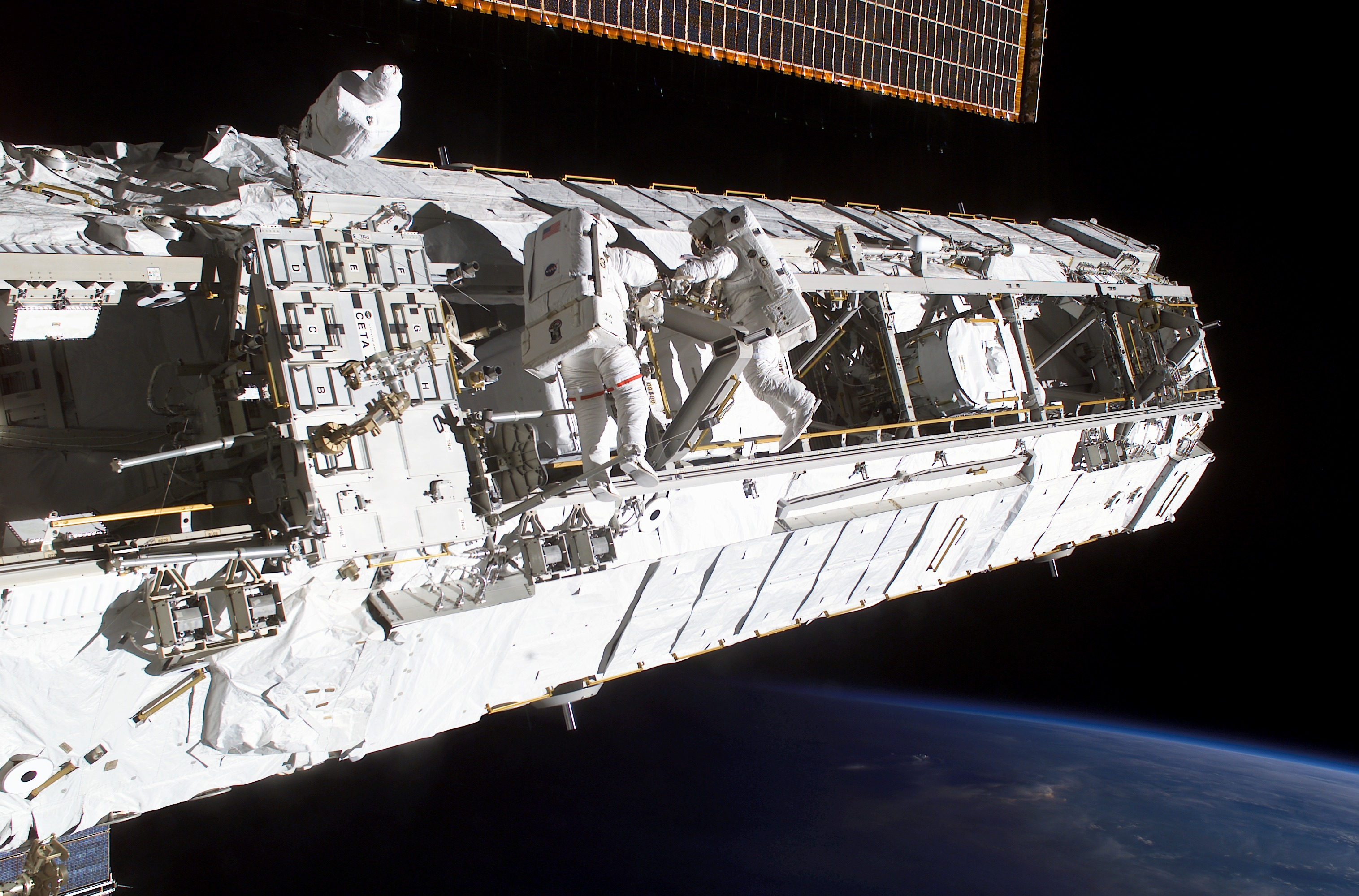
Image taken during STS-113 in 2002 showing a portion of the ITS.

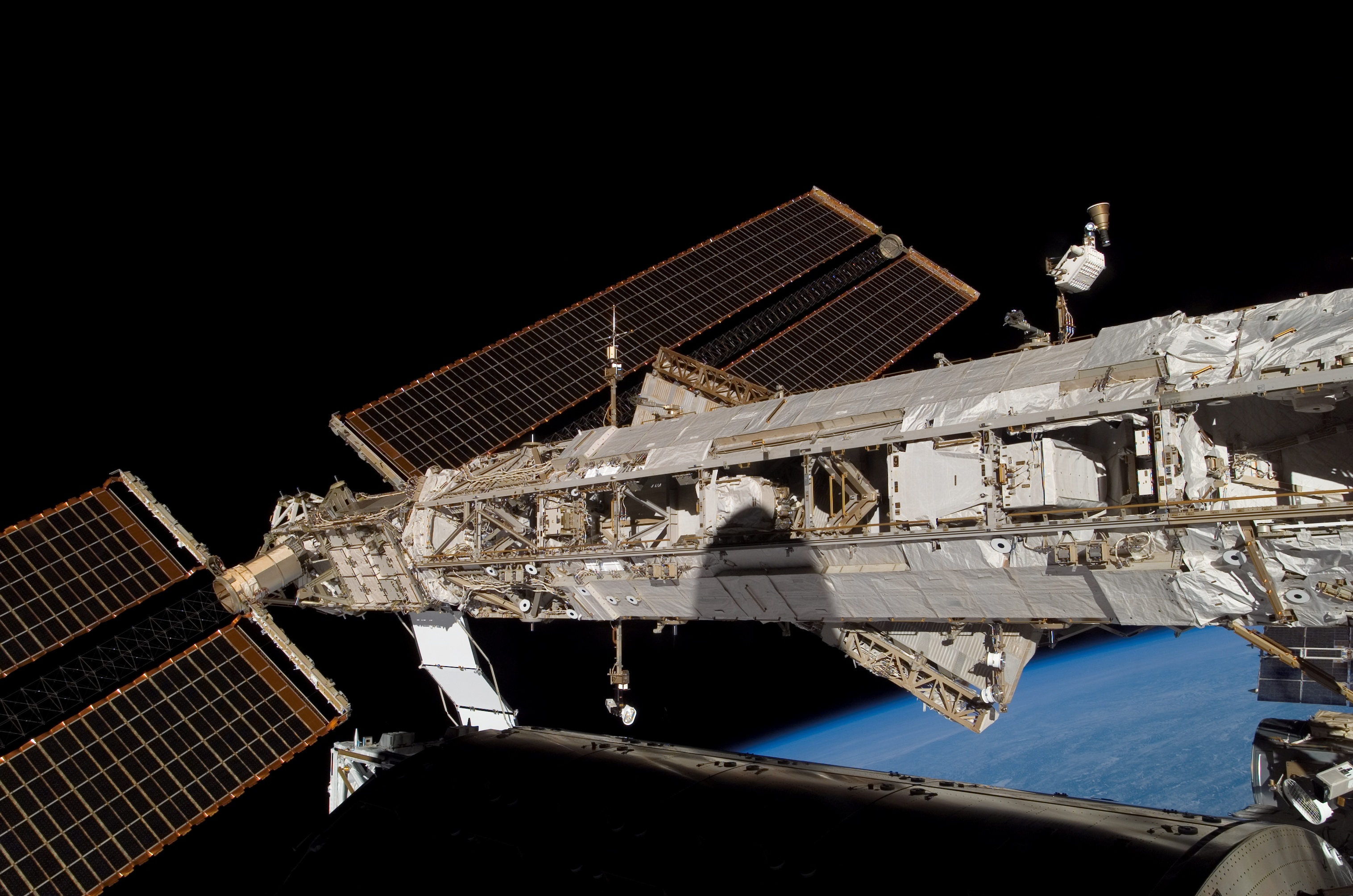
Image taken during STS-122 in 2008 showing an ITS segment with solar array attached at one end.

The Integrated Truss Structure (ITS) houses vital equipment on the exterior of the ISS. Each segment of truss is given a designation of P or S, indicating whether the segment is on the port or starboard side, and a number which indicates its position on its respective side. The truss system itself consists of 12 total segments—four on each side, and one central segment—which are connected to the ISS by attachment points on the Destiny module. The thirteenth piece, known as the Zenith-1 (Z1) truss segment, is attached to the Unity module, and was originally used to hold the P6 solar arrays to provide power to the USOS. The Z1 segment now houses the K_{u}-band antennas and serves as a routing point for power and data cables on the exterior of the ISS. The Integrated Truss Structure is made from stainless steel, titanium and aluminum. It spans approximately 110 meters long and houses four sets of solar arrays. Each set of solar arrays contains four arrays for a total of 16 solar arrays. Each of the four sets of arrays also has an associated cooling system and radiator for cooling the power supply equipment. The Integrated Truss Structure also houses the main cooling system for the ISS, which consists of two pumps, two radiator arrays, and two ammonia and two nitrogen tank assemblies. There are also several payload attachment points located on the Integrated Truss Structure. These points host the External Stowage Platforms, External Logistics Carriers, Alpha Magnetic Spectrometer and the Mobile Base System for the Canadarm2. The Z1 truss was delivered by the STS-92 mission in October 2000. The P6 segment was installed on STS-97 in December 2000. The S0 truss was delivered to the ISS on STS-110, with the S1 segment following on STS-112. The P1 segment of the truss was brought to the ISS by STS-113, followed by the P3/P4 segment on STS-115, and the P5 segment on STS-116. The S3/S4 truss segment was delivered by STS-117, followed by the S5 segment STS-118. The last component of the truss segment, the S6 segment, was delivered by STS-119.

=== External Stowage Platform ===
The External Stowage Platforms (ESP), are a series of platforms that are used to store Orbital Replacement Units (ORU) on the ISS. The ESP's provide power to the ORU's but do not allow command and data handling. External Stowage Platform 1 is located on the port side of the Destiny lab and was delivered on the STS-102 mission in March 2001. ESP-2 is located on the port side of the Quest airlock, and was brought to the ISS by the STS-114 crew in 2005. ESP-3 is located on the Starboard 3 (S3) truss segment and was delivered to the ISS on the STS-118 mission in August 2007.

=== ExPRESS logistics carrier ===
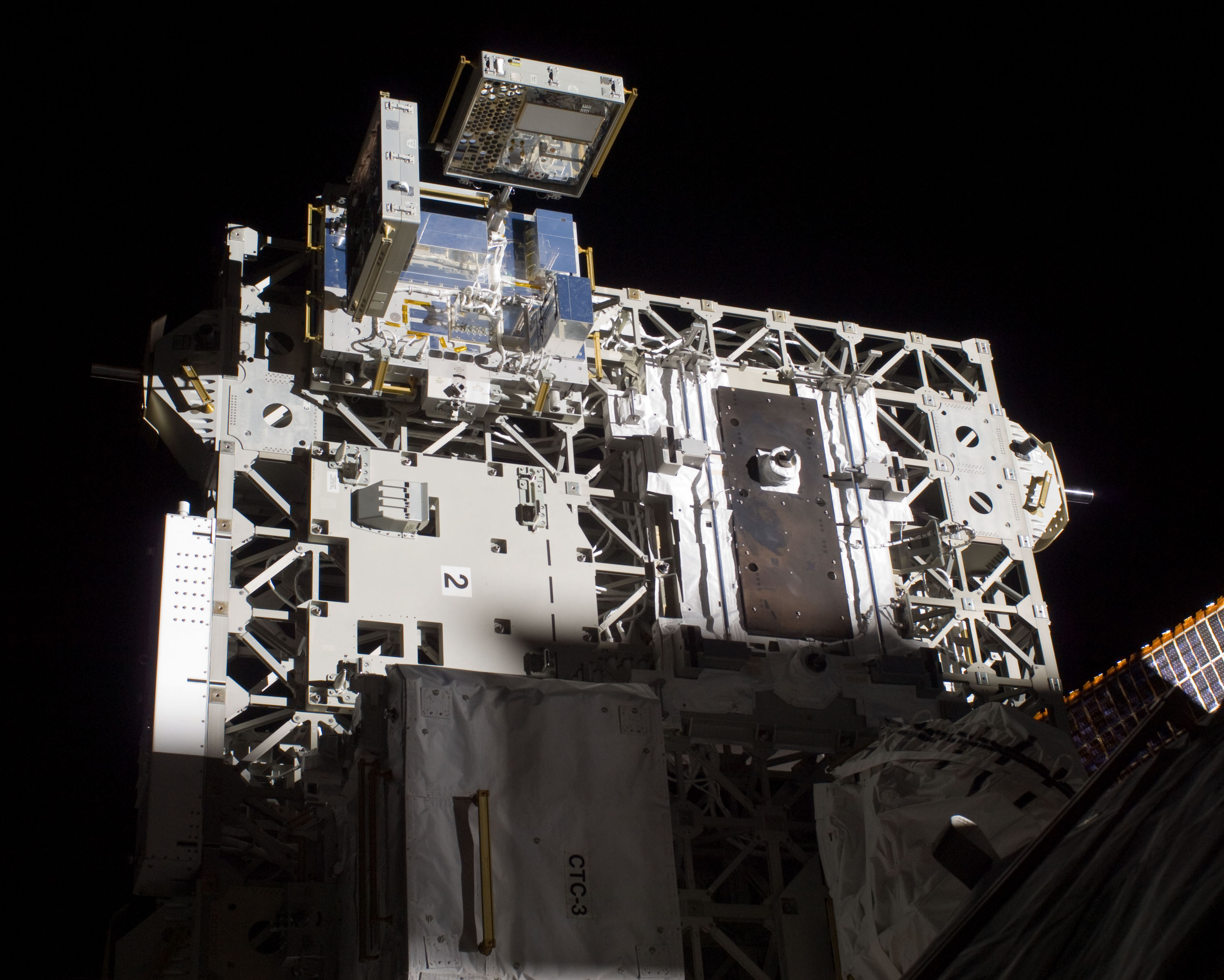
ELC-2 on the truss structure

The ExPRESS logistics carriers (ELCs) are similar to the External Stowage Platform, but designed to carry more cargo. Unlike the ESPs, the ELCs allow for command and data handling. They utilize a steel grid structure where external mounted containers, payloads and gyroscopes are mounted; and science experiments can be fitted. Some ELC components have been built by the Brazilian Space Agency. ExPRESS Logistics Carriers 1, located on the lower P3 truss, and ELC 2, located on the upper S3 truss, were delivered by the STS-129 mission in November 2009. ELC-3 was brought to the ISS by the STS-134 crew, is located on the upper P3 truss. ELC-4 was delivered and installed on the lower S3 truss segment, during the STS-133 mission.

=== Alpha Magnetic Spectrometer 2 ===
The Alpha Magnetic Spectrometer (AMS) is a particle physics experiment that is mounted on the S3 truss segment. The AMS is designed to search for dark matter and anti-matter. Five hundred scientists from 56 different institutions and 16 countries participated in the development and construction of the AMS. The Alpha Magnetic Spectrometer was delivered by the STS-134 crew.

=== Mobile Servicing System ===
The components of the MSS were supplied by the Canadian Space Agency in conjunction with MDA Space Missions. The Mobile Transporter that carries the Mobile Base System was designed and built by Northrop Grumman under contract with NASA.

==== Canadarm2 ====
The main component of the mobile servicing system is the Canadarm2, also known as the Space Station Remote Manipulator System (SSRMS). The arm is capable of moving large, heavy payloads that cannot be handled by astronauts during a spacewalk. The arm has a payload capacity of 116,000 kg (256,000 lb), and 7 degrees of freedom. Canadarm2 is also capable of changing where it is stationed and what end is used. There are grapple fixtures for the Candarm2 on the Destiny lab, Harmony node, Unity node and the Mobile Base System. A grapple fixture is installed on the Zarya module, but does not have data cables connected. Once these cables are connected, the Canadarm2 will be able to position itself on the exterior of Zarya and will be able to support Extra-vehicular Activity (EVA) in the vicinity the Russian Orbital Segment (ROS). The Canadarm2 was assembled and installed by the STS-100 crew in early 2001.

==== Special Purpose Dextrous Manipulator ====
The Special Purpose Dexterous Manipulator (SPDM), also known as Dextre, is a two armed robot that can be attached to the ISS, the Mobile Base System or Canadarm2. Dextre is capable of performing tasks that would otherwise require an astronaut to perform. These tasks include switching orbital replacement units or moving ORUs from their stowage locations to where they are to be installed. Using Dextre can reduce preparatory time needed to perform certain tasks and afford astronauts the ability to invest more time in the completion of other tasks. Dextre's primary grapple fixture is located on the Destiny lab, but can also be mounted on any powered grapple fixture on the ISS. It has a payload capacity of 600 kg (1,300 lb), and 15 degrees of freedom. Dextre was delivered to the ISS by STS-123.

==== Mobile Base System ====
The Mobile Base System (MBS) is a rail car-like device installed on the Integrated Truss Structure of the ISS. It weighs 886 kg (1,953 lb), and has a payload capacity of 20,954 kg (46,196 lb). The MBS can move from the Starboard 3 (S3) to the Port 3 (P3) truss segments and has a top speed of 2.5 cm/s (0.082 ft/s). The MBS has four PDGFs which can be used as mounts for the Canadarm2 and Dextre, as well as a Payload/Orbital Replacement Unit Accommodations (POA), to hold payloads and Orbital Replacement Units (ORUs). The MBS also has a common attach system, to grapple a special capture bar on payloads. It also has its own main computer and video distribution units, and remote power control modules. The MBS was delivered on STS-111 in June 2002.

==== Enhanced ISS Boom Assembly ====
The Enhanced ISS Boom Assembly is used to extend the reach of Canadarm2 and provides detailed inspection capability. There are lasers and cameras at the end of the boom able to record at a resolution of a few millimeters. The boom is also fitted with handrails, so that it can assist spacewalkers during EVAs as was done on STS-120 to repair the solar arrays.

== Proposed modules ==
=== Axiom PPTM ===
On January 27, 2020, NASA announced that it had given permission to Axiom Space to launch up to three modules to attach to the International Space Station. As of December 2024, Axiom Space expects to launch one module to the ISS, where it will dock at one of two ports currently used by cargo spacecraft. This module, the Payload Power Thermal Module (PPTM), will include power and thermal systems as well as multiple racks for research payloads. PPTM is expected to be launched no earlier than 2027 and remain at the ISS until the launch of Axiom's Habitat One (Hab-1) module no earlier than 2028, after which it will undock from the ISS to join with Hab-1.

== Cancelled modules ==
There are various proposed modules to extend the US Orbital Segment.

=== Habitation Extension Modules ===
The Habitation Extension Modules (HEM) refer to proposed British-built modules designed to connect to Tranquility module of the International Space Station. They were conceived by a consortium of engineers and scientists led by Mark Hempsell, aeronautical engineer at the University of Bristol. The proposal has no formal support of the British government, as of January 2008. If funded, the modules were intended to be launched sometime in 2011.

=== Node 4 ===
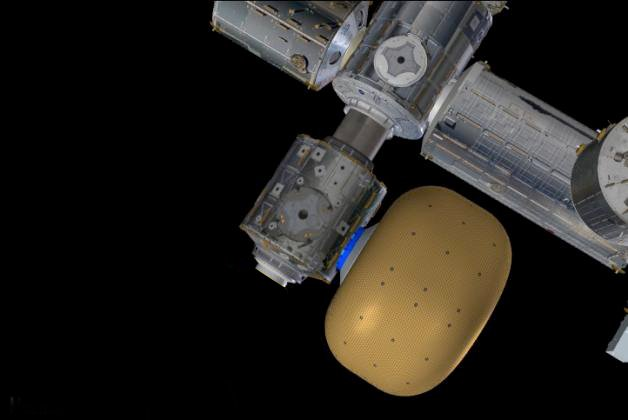
An artist's concept of the Node 4 with an inflatable module

Node 4, also known as the Docking Hub System (DHS), was a proposed module that would have been built using the Node Structural Test Article (STA) and docked to the forward port of the Harmony module. The Structural Test Article was built to facilitate testing of ISS hardware and was intended to become Node 1. However, during construction, structural design flaws were discovered. The under-construction Node 2 was renamed Node 1 and the STA (ex-Node 1) was put into storage at the Kennedy Space Center (KSC).

In 2011, NASA was considering a 40-month design and development effort for Node 4 that would result in its launch in late 2013. Since the Space Shuttle program was retired, had a decision to build and launch Node 4 been taken, it would have been launched by an Atlas V or Delta IV Heavy launch vehicle.

=== Centrifuge demonstration ===
In order to assess and characterize influences and effects of the centrifuge relative to human reactions, mechanical dynamic responses and influences, the demonstration of Nautilus-X centrifuge would be tested on the ISS.

If produced, this centrifuge would have been the first in-space demonstration of sufficient scale for artificial partial-G effects. The demonstrator would be sent using a single Delta IV Heavy or Atlas V launch vehicle. The full cost of such a demonstrator would be between US$83 million and US$143 million.

=== XBASE ===
In August 2016, Bigelow Aerospace negotiated an agreement with NASA to develop a full-sized ground prototype Deep Space Habitation based on the B330 under the second phase of Next Space Technologies for Exploration Partnerships. The module is called the Expandable Bigelow Advanced Station Enhancement (XBASE), as Bigelow hopes to test the module by attaching it to the International Space Station.

== Operation ==
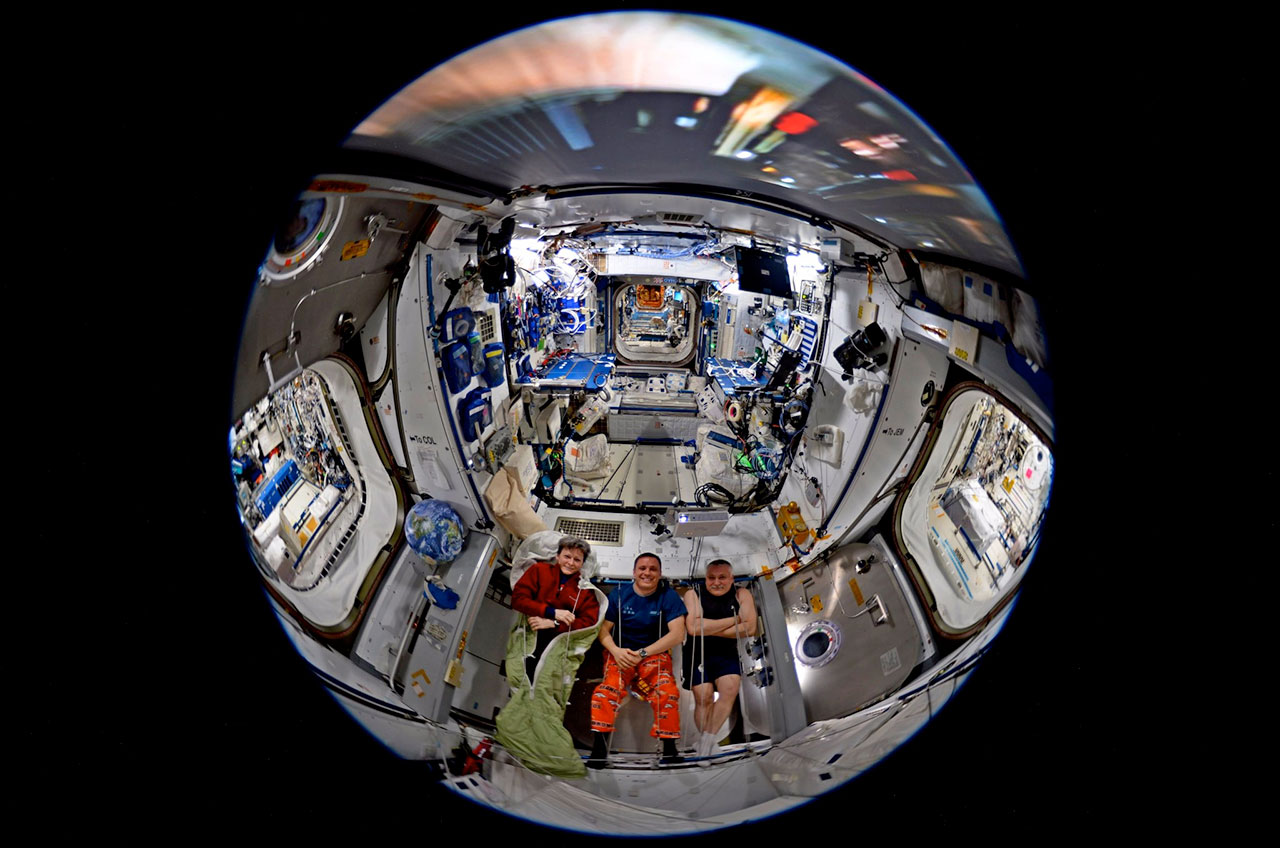
Fisheye view of the U.S. segment of the ISS

Operational control of the US Orbital Segment of the ISS is accomplished by NASA and the ESA, the agency that manages the civilian portion of the US government space program.

In the early years of the ISS operation beginning in 2000, a lot of the work in the US Orbital Segment was performed by NASA astronauts—although some NASA-trained astronauts were employees of non-US government space agencies—and all cargo and crew transport to the space station was handled by NASA-owned spacecraft, specifically, by the Space Shuttle. Beginning in the late 2000s, NASA began to contract for commercial services to transport cargo to the space station with services beginning in 2012. By 2020, operational commercial flights were handling ISS USOS crew transport as well.

In 2010, NASA began to open up a limited amount of its space and astronaut time on the US Orbital Segment to commercial use. In 2005, the US Congress authorized that one of the several U.S. National Laboratories should exist on board the ISS, and commercial research could be done there. The Center for the Advancement of Science in Space (CASIS) was set up to operate the lab. In September 2009, Nanoracks signed the first contract with NASA to utilize the on-orbit lab space, and had their first laboratory on the Space Station in April 2010. Other companies followed, however the commercial space and commercial experiments on the ISS have always been limited, with most orbital segment space and experiments reserved for direct use by NASA, the ESA and JAXA.

Prices to be paid by commercial companies utilizing the ISS National Lab on USOS were heavily subsidized from 2010 until early 2021. Beginning in March 2021, the subsidy was removed, and prices raised by NASA to approximate "full reimbursement for the value of NASA resources."

NASA published a "Commercial and Marketing Pricing Policy" beginning in 2019. The historical prices and ~2021 prices on offer for services in the USOS are:

NASA-provided Service	2010−2019 price	2019−2020 price	2021−present price	Comments
Transport cargo to ISS (US$/kg)		US$3,000	US$20,000	
Transport cargo from ISS to Earth (US$/kg)		US$6,000	US$40,000	
Crew member time (US$/hour)		US$17,500	US$130,000	
Private astronaut crew supplies (US$/day)	N/A	N/A	US$22,500	
Private astronaut life support (US$/day)	N/A	N/A	US$11,250	
Stowage (US$ per CTBE per day)		US$105		
Power (US$/kWh)		US$42		
Data downlink (US$/GB)		US$50		
Trash disposal (US$/kg)		US$3,000	US$20,000	

== See also ==
- NASA X-38, canceled crew return vehicle
- NASA HL-20/Dream Chaser proposed crew return vehicle
- Russian Orbital Segment
