= Voskhod-M =

Russian audio subsystem on the International Space Station

The Voskhod-M (Russian: Восход-М) is an audio subsystem on the International Space Station (ISS) designed to provide radio communications between crewmembers and the ground or nearby Soyuz spacecraft. The system enables internal telephone communications between Zvezda, Zarya, Pirs, Poisk and the USOS, and also provides a VHF radio link to ground control centres via antennas on Zvezda's exterior.
