= SpaceX CRS-7 =

Failed 2015 American resupply spaceflight to the ISS

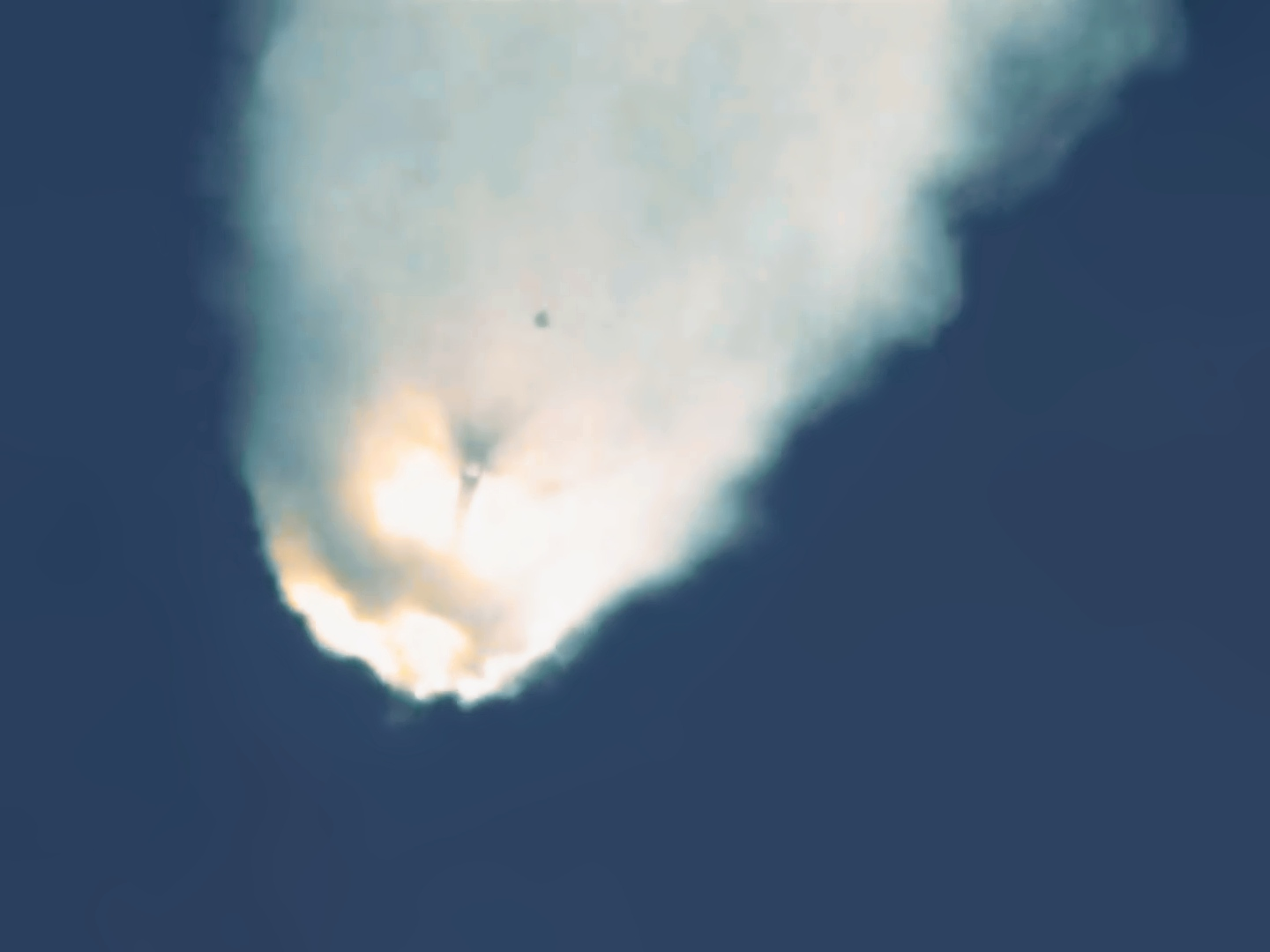
- Disintegration of the SpaceX CRS-7 launch vehicle approximately two minutes after liftoff as seen from a NASA tracking camera.
- Names: SpX-7
- Mission type: ISS resupply
- Operator: SpaceX
- Mission duration: 2 minutes, 19 seconds

Spacecraft properties
- Spacecraft: Dragon 1 C109
- Spacecraft type: Dragon 1
- Manufacturer: SpaceX

Start of mission
- Launch date: 28 June 2015, 14:21:11 UTC
- Rocket: Falcon 9 v1.1 (B1018)
- Launch site: Cape Canaveral, SLC-40
- Contractor: SpaceX

End of mission
- Disposal: Destroyed on launch
- Destroyed: 28 June 2015, 14:23:30 UTC

Orbital parameters
- Reference system: Geocentric
- Regime: Low Earth
- Inclination: 51.6°
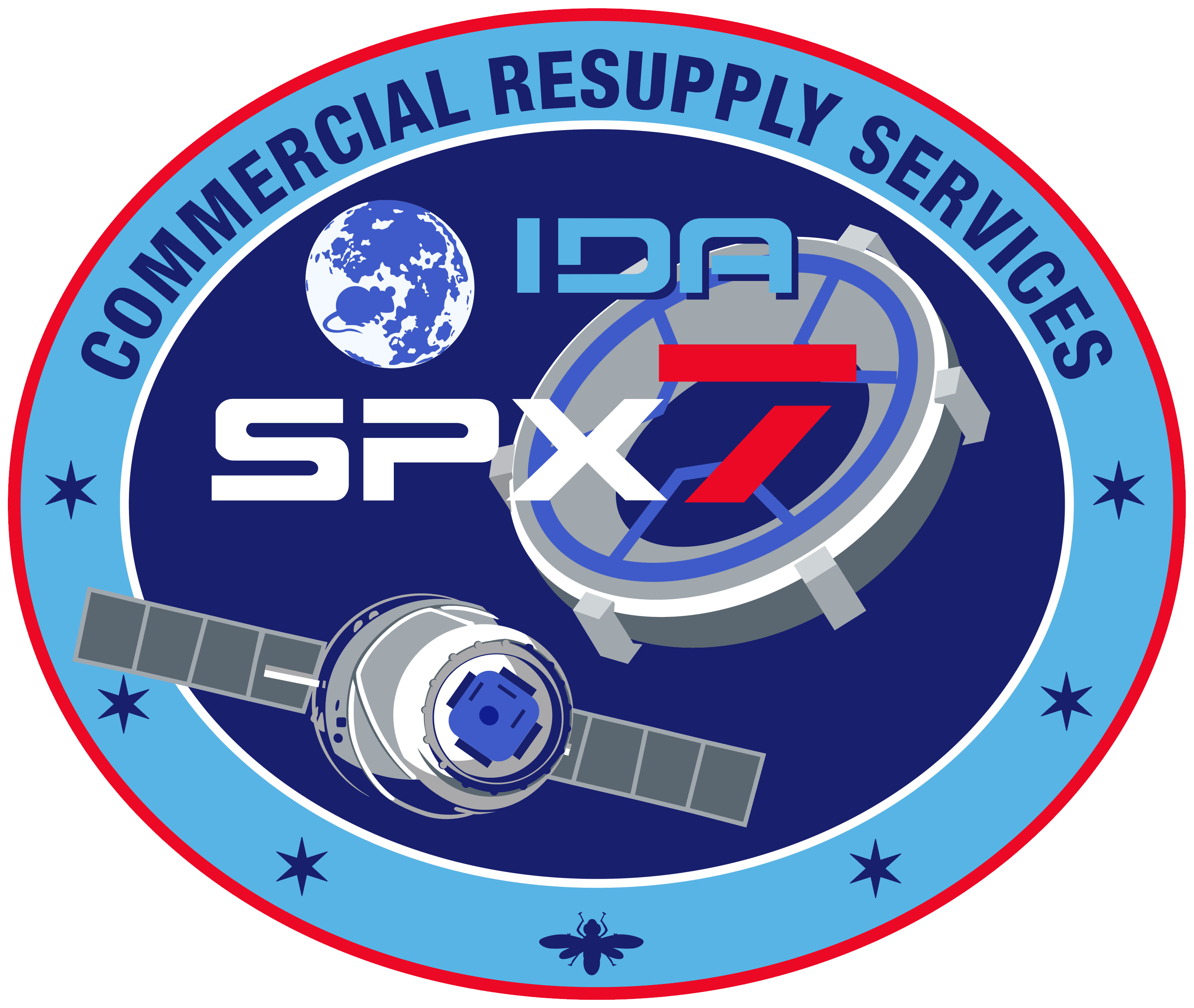
- NASA SpX-7 mission patch Commercial Resupply Services Cargo Dragon

SpaceX CRS-7, also known as SpX-7, was a private American Commercial Resupply Service mission to the International Space Station, contracted to NASA, which launched and failed on June 28, 2015. It disintegrated 139 seconds into the flight after launch from Cape Canaveral, just before the first stage was to separate from the second stage. It was the ninth flight for SpaceX's uncrewed Dragon cargo spacecraft and the seventh SpaceX operational mission contracted to NASA under a Commercial Resupply Services contract. The vehicle launched on a Falcon 9 v1.1 launch vehicle. It was the nineteenth overall flight for the Falcon 9 and the fourteenth flight for the substantially upgraded Falcon 9 v1.1.

== Launch history ==
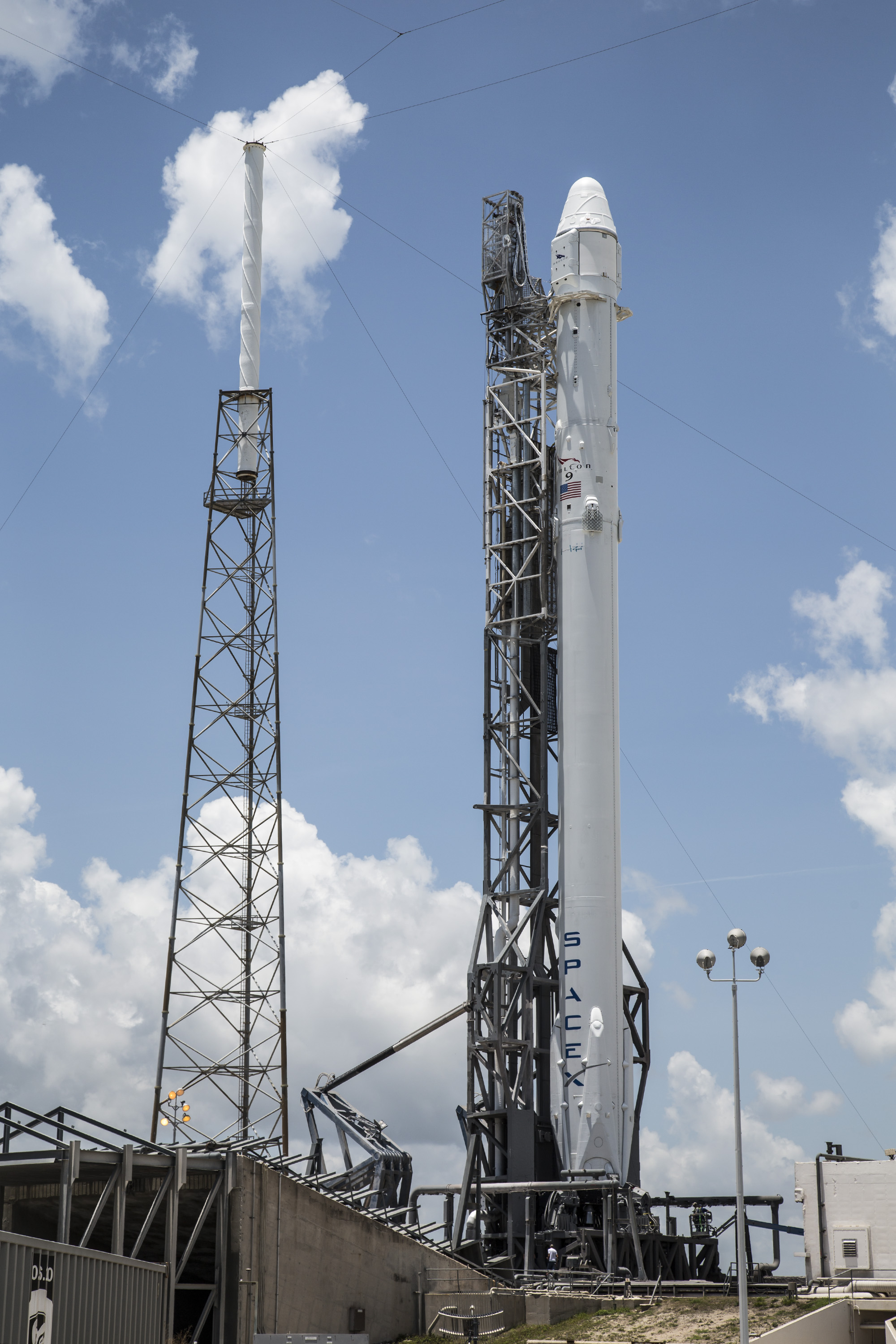
SpaceX CRS-7 prior to launch

In January 2015, the launch was tentatively scheduled by NASA for no earlier than June 13, 2015. This was adjusted to June 22, 2015, then moved forward to June 19, 2015, and adjusted again to June 26, 2015. Subsequently, the launch had been rescheduled to June 28, 2015, at 14:21:11 UTC, from Cape Canaveral LC-40. The launch was scheduled to be the third controlled-descent and landing test for the Falcon 9's first stage. It would have attempted to land on a new autonomous drone ship named Of Course I Still Love You – named after a ship in the novel The Player of Games by Iain M. Banks. The spacecraft was planned to stay in orbit for five weeks before returning to Earth with approximately 1,400 pounds (640 kg) of supplies and waste.

=== Launch failure ===
Video of disintegration and explosion of rocket

Performance was nominal until 139 seconds into launch when a cloud of white vapor appeared, followed by a rapid loss of pressure in the liquid oxygen tank of the Falcon 9's second stage. The booster continued on its trajectory until the vehicle completely broke up several seconds later. The Dragon CRS-7 capsule was ejected from the exploding launch vehicle and continued transmitting data until it impacted the ocean. SpaceX officials stated that it could have been recovered if the parachutes had deployed, but the software version in the capsule did not include any provisions for parachute deployment in this situation.

=== Investigation ===
Subsequent investigation traced the accident to the failure of a strut that secured a high-pressure helium bottle inside the second stage's liquid oxygen tank. The COPV bottle containing helium had broken loose and struck the upper dome of the oxygen tank with catastrophic effect. The report from SpaceX pointed out that the stainless-steel eye bolt was rated for a load of 10000 pounds, but failed at 2000 pounds.

An independent investigation by NASA concluded that the most probable cause of the strut failure was a design error: instead of using a stainless-steel eye bolt made of aerospace-grade material, SpaceX chose an industrial-grade material without adequate screening and testing and overlooked the recommended safety margin.

== Payload ==
=== Primary payload ===
NASA contracted with SpaceX for the CRS-7 mission and set the primary payload, date/time of launch, and orbital parameters for the Dragon space capsule.

At the time of the launch, the first International Docking Adapter, IDA-1, was scheduled for delivery to the International Space Station on CRS-7. This adapter would have been attached to one of the Pressurized Mating Adapters (PMA-2 or PMA-3) and converted the APAS-95 docking interface to the newer NASA Docking System (NDS). These adapters allow docking of the newer human-transport spacecraft of the Commercial Crew Program. Previous United States cargo missions after the retirement of the Space Shuttle were berthed, rather than docked, while docking is considered the safer and preferred method for spacecraft carrying humans. The subsequent Cargo Dragon missions CRS-9 and CRS-18 brought docking adapters IDA-2 and IDA-3, to PMA-2 and PMA-3 respectively. They have been in use since 2020.

==== Detailed payload manifest ====
A full listing of the cargo aboard the failed mission included:

- A Gorilla Suit
- Crew Supplies — 690 kilograms (1,520 lb)
  - 92 Food Bulk Overwrap Bags, 2 Bonus Food Kits, 2 Fresh Food Kits, including custom astronaut food cooked by British chef Heston Blumenthal for British astronaut Tim Peake
  - Crew Provisions, Crew Care, Operations data file
- Utilization — 573 kilograms (1,263 lb)
  - Canadian Space Agency: Vascular Echo Exercise Band
  - European Space Agency: Circadian Rhythms, KUBIK EBOXes, Interface Plate, EPO Peake, BioLab, Spheroids, EMCS RBLSS, Airway Mon., LiOH Cartridge
  - Japan Aerospace Exploration Agency: Atomization, Biological Rhythms, Multi-omics, Cell Mechanosensing 3, Plant Gravity Sensing 3, SAIBO L&M, Space Pup, Stem Cells, MSPR LM, Group Combustion Camera
  - US: 2 Polars, 6 DCBs and Ice Bricks, 1 MERLIN, FCF/HRF Resupply, HRP Resupply [Kits, MCT, Microbiome, Twin Studies], IMAX Camera, Meteor, Micro-9, MSG Resupply, NanoRacks Modules & 0.5 NRCSD #7, Universal Battery Charger, Veg-03, Microbial Observatory-1, Microchannel Diffusion Experiment, Wetlab RNA Smartcycler, SCK, Story Time, MELFI TDR Batteries
- Computer resources — 36 kilograms (79 lb)
  - Projector screen, Sidekick, OCT laptop and power supply, 32 GB microSD cards, generic USB cables, power modules and card readers, preloaded ThinkPad T61p hard drives, CD storage container, network-attached storage devices, XF305 camcorders, RS-422 adapter cables
- Vehicle hardware — 462 kilograms (1,019 lb)
  - CHECS CMS: HRM Watches, Bench Lock Studs, Glenn Harness for Kelly, Kopra and Peake
  - CHECS EHS: CO_{2} Monitoring Assemblies, Filter Assemblies, CSA-CP/CDM Battery Assemblies, SIECE Cartridge Assemblies, Water Kit, Petri Dish Packets
  - CHECS HMS: IMAKs, Oral Med Packs
  - C&T: C2V2 Communications Unit (and HTV-5 Unit Data Converter)
  - ECLSS: 3 Pretreat Tanks, Filter Inserts, 9 KTOs, UPA FCPA, CDRS ASV, IMV Valve, Wring Collector, Water Sampling Kits, OGS ACTEX Filter, ARFTA Brine Filter Assemblies, O_{2}/N_{2} Pressure Sensor, NORS O_{2} Tank, **3 PBA Assemblies, 2 MF Beds, 2 Urine Receptacles, Toilet Paper Packages, H_{2} Sensor, Ammonia Cartridge Bag, PTU XFER Hose
  - EPS: 2 Avionics Restart Cables
  - Makita Drill, PWD Filter, N3 Bulkhead Connectors, Yellow/Red Adapters, IWIS Plates, 6.0 & 4.0 Waste Xfer Bags, BEAM Ground Straps, JEM Stowage Wire Kit
- EVA Hardware — 167 kilograms (368 lb)
  - SEMU, REBA, EMU Ion Filters (4), Equipment Tethers, Gas Grap, EMU Mirrors, Crew Lock Bags, SEMU arms/legs
  - Lindgren/Yui ECOKs & CCAs, Lindgren LCVG
  - Kelly LCVG, Padalka EMU Gloves
- Russian Cargo
  - Russian Segment Torque Wrench
- Unpressurized Cargo — 526 kilograms (1,160 lb)
  - International Docking Adapter #1

The mission would have transported more than 4,000 pounds (1,800 kg) of supplies and experiments to the International Space Station including the Meteor Composition Determination investigation which would have observed meteors entering the Earth's atmosphere by taking high resolution photos and videos. The Center for the Advancement of Science in Space had arranged for it to carry more than 30 student research projects to the station including experiments dealing with pollination in microgravity as well as an experiment to evaluate a sunlight blocking form of plastic.

CRS-7 would have brought a pair of modified Microsoft HoloLenses to the International Space Station as part of Project Sidekick.

== Planned post-launch flight test ==
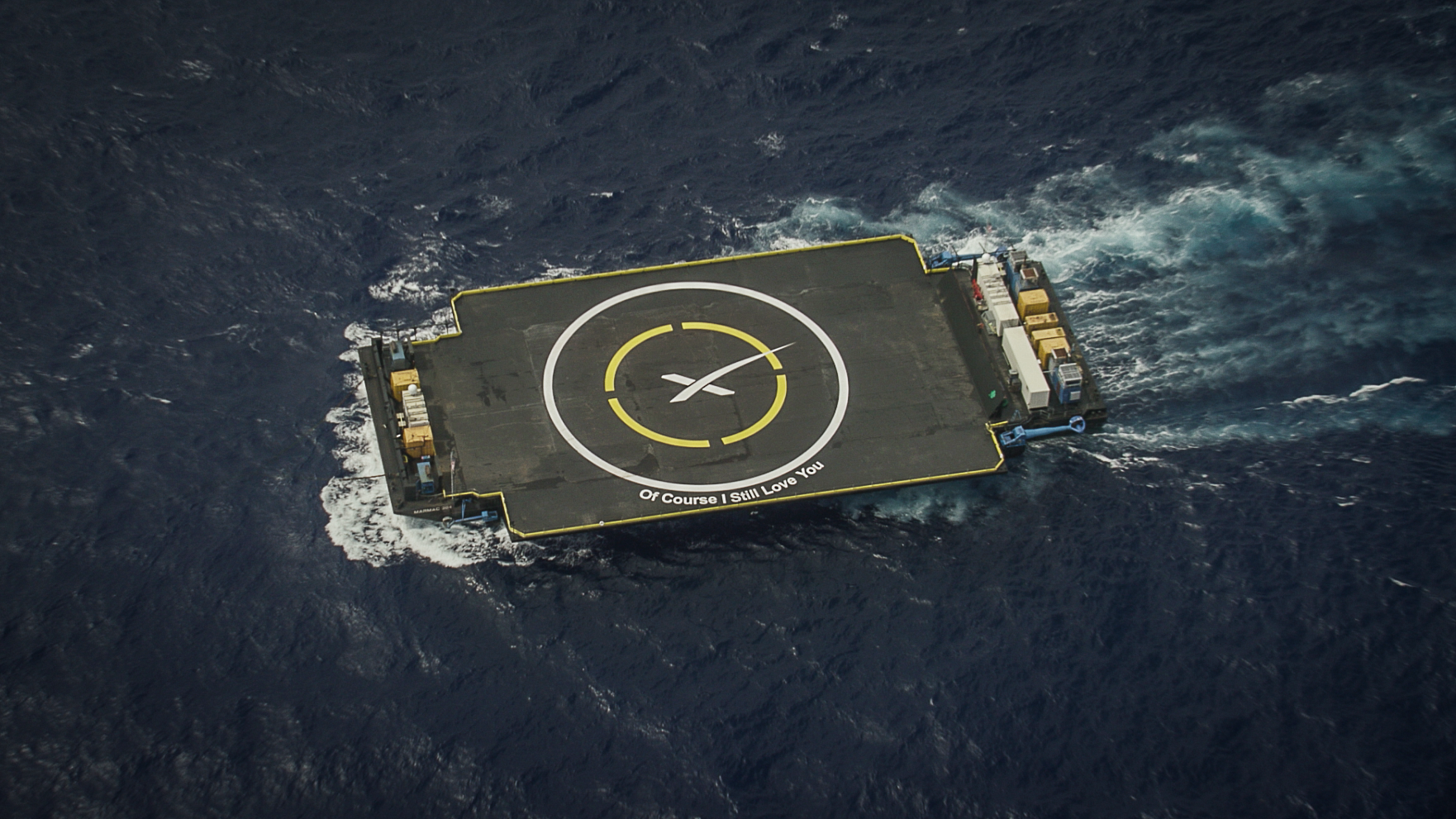
The Of Course I Still Love You floating landing platform prior to the launch

After the second stage separation, SpaceX planned to conduct a flight test and attempt to return the Falcon 9's nearly empty first stage through the atmosphere and land it on autonomous spaceport drone ship Of Course I Still Love You.

This would have been SpaceX's third attempt to land the booster on a floating platform after earlier tests in January 2015 and April 2015 were not successful. The boosters were fitted with a variety of technologies to facilitate the flight test, including grid fins and landing legs to facilitate the post-mission test.

== See also ==
- 2015 in spaceflight
- List of Falcon 9 and Falcon Heavy launches
- Cygnus Orb-3
- Progress M-27M
