= International Berthing and Docking Mechanism =

Spacecraft docking mechanism

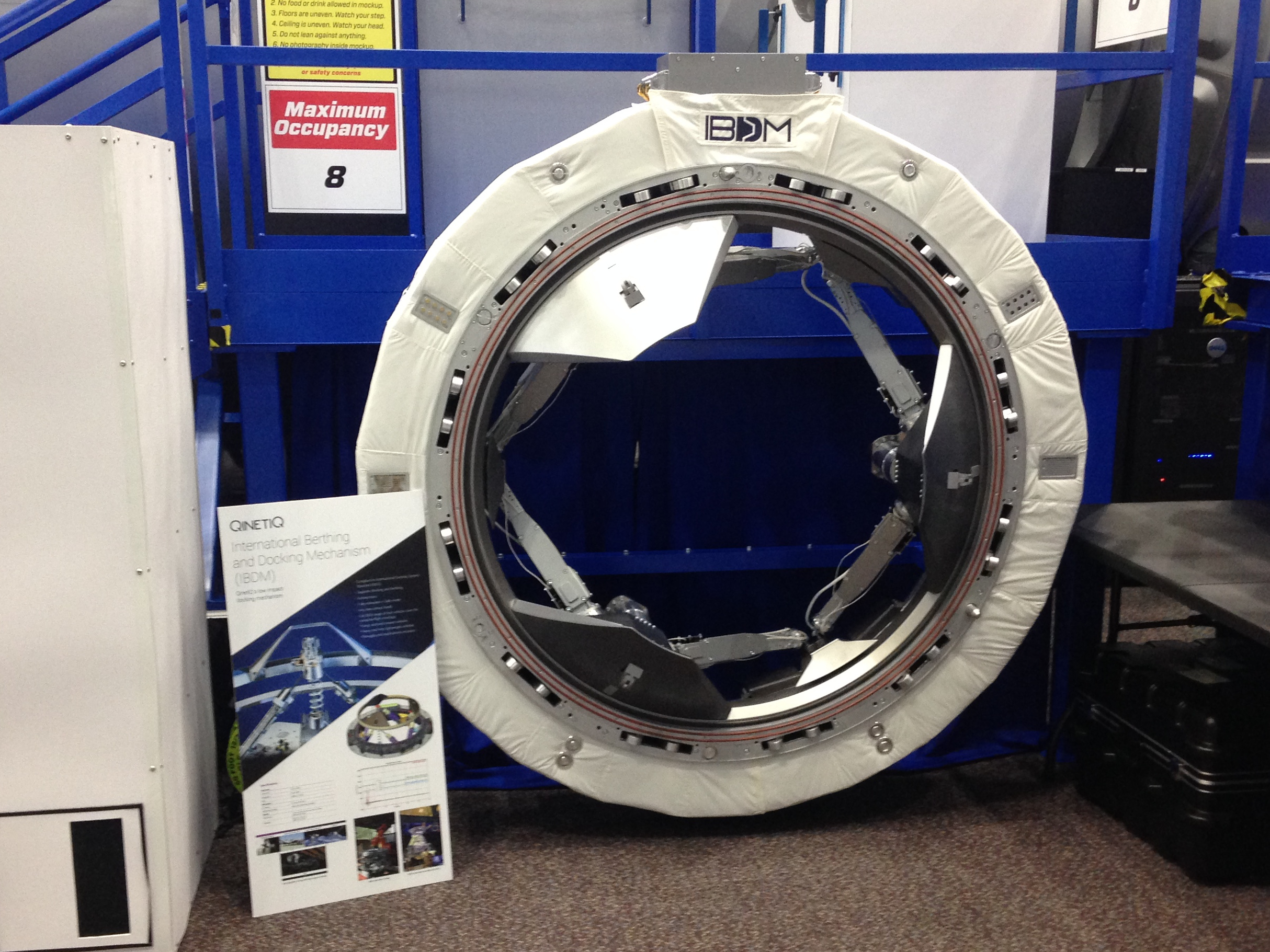

Description
- Role: Part of SNC's Dream Chaser to supply cargo to the International Space Station
- Prime: QinetiQ Space under ESA contract

Dimensions
- Outer width: 1.42 m (4 ft 8 in)
- Passageway: 0.8 m (2 ft 7 in)
- Mass: <325 kg (716 lb 8 oz)

Performance
- Endurance: At least 210 days
- Capture success rate: >98% using IDSS initial conditions

Avionics
- Redundancy: Hot redundant (switch-over in less than 150 m (490 ft)) + passive safe mode
- Interfaces: 28 V DC or 120 V DC and 28 V DC

The International Berthing and Docking Mechanism (IBDM) is the European androgynous low impact docking mechanism that is capable of docking and berthing large and small spacecraft. The development of the IBDM is under ESA contract with QinetiQ Space as prime contractor.

== History ==
The IBDM development was initiated as a joint development programme with NASA JSC. The first application of the IBDM was intended to be the ISS Crew Return Vehicle (CRV). In the original Agency to Agency agreement, it was decided to develop an Engineering Development Unit (EDU) to demonstrate the feasibility of the system and the associated technologies. NASA JSC were responsible for the system and avionics designs and ESA for the mechanical design. However, since the cancellation of the CRV program, the two Agencies have independently progressed with the docking system development.

The IBDM is designed to be compatible with the International Docking System Standard (IDSS) and is hence compatible with the ISS International Docking Adapters (IDA) on the US side of the ISS.

The European Space Agency started a cooperation with SNC to provide the IBDM for attaching this new vehicle to the ISS in the future. After SNC was selected as a commercial contractor to resupply the International Space Station in January 2016, ESA decided to spend 33 million euros ($36 million) to complete the design of the IBDM and build a flight model for Dream Chaser’s first mission.

== Design ==
The IBDM provides both docking and berthing capability. The docking mechanism comprises a Soft Capture Mechanism (SCS), and a structural mating system called the Hard Capture System (HCS), explained in more detail below. The IBDM avionics runs in hot redundancy.

=== Soft Capture System ===
The SCS utilizes active control using 6 servo-actuated legs from RUAG Space (Switzerland) which are coordinated to control the SCS ring in its 6 degrees of freedom. The leg forces are measured to modify the compliance of the SCS ring to facilitate alignment of the active platform during capture. A large range of vehicle mass properties can be handled. Mechanical latches achieve soft capture.

=== Hard Capture System ===
The HCS uses structural hook mechanisms to close the sealed mated interface. QinetiQ Space has developed several generations of latches and hooks to come to the final hook design. SENER (Spain) will be responsible for the further development and qualification of the HCS subsystem.

=== Features ===
The key feature of IBDM is that it is a fully computer controlled mechanism, and it is able to take part in smooth low impact docking and berthing (which reduces contact forces and resultant structural loads), autonomous operations in case of failures, flexibility in vehicle mass making it suitable for applications ranging from explorations to resupply missions. A backup safe mode is also available in case of failure.

== Application ==
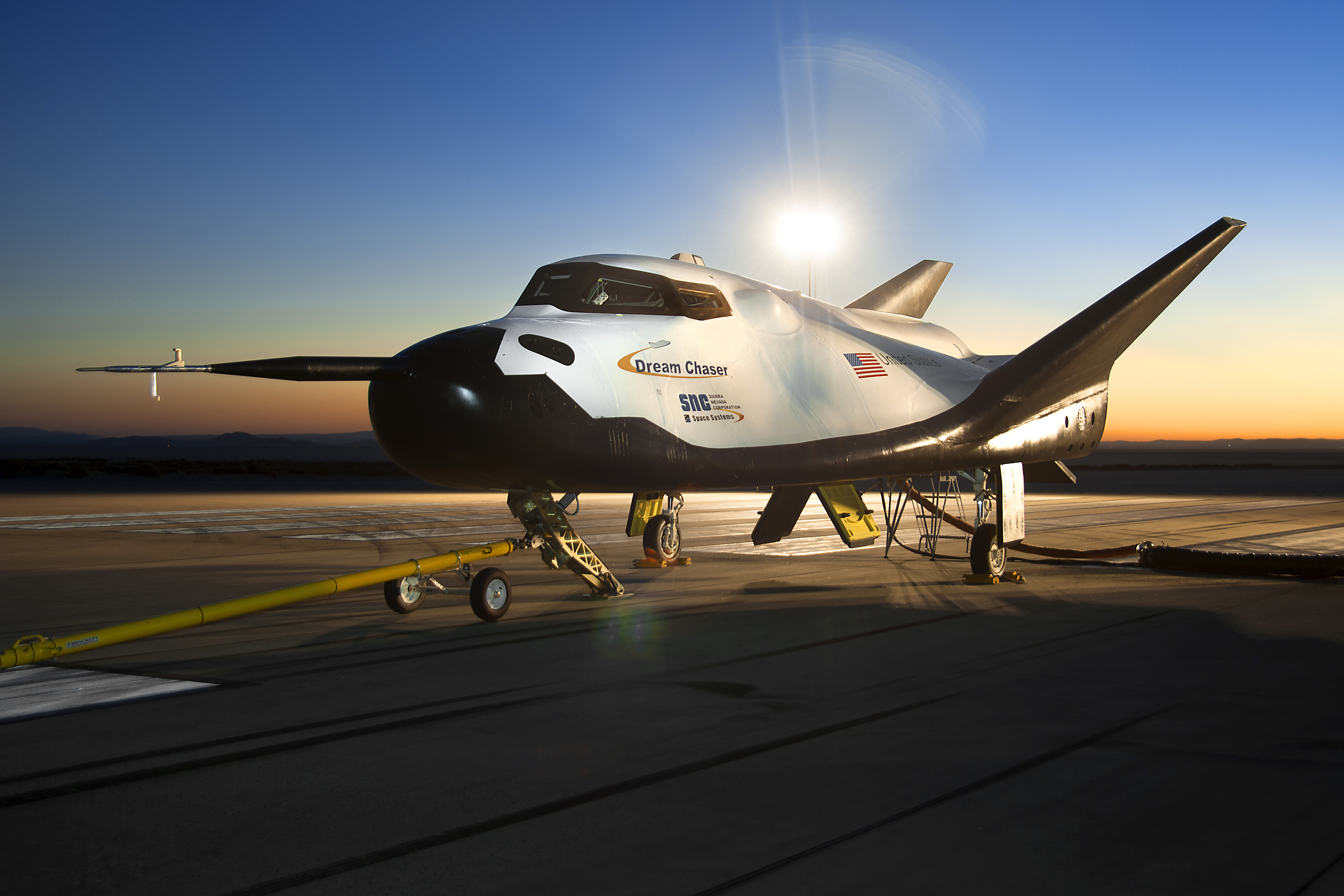
Dream Chaser

The American company Sierra Nevada Corporation (SNC) is developing the Dream Chaser, which is a small reusable spacecraft that is selected to transport cargo and/or crew to the ISS. The European Space Agency has started a cooperation with SNC to potentially provide the IBDM for attaching this new vehicle to the ISS in the future. The IBDM will be mounted to the unpressurised cargo module, which will be ejected before reentry.

== Status ==
The IBDM development has successfully passed the Critical Design Review (December 2015). An engineering model of the mechanism and its heat-redundant avionics has been developed and successfully tested (March 2016). The performance of the system has been verified at the certified SDTS docking test facility at NASA JSC. The consortium has currently started the manufacturing of the full IBDM qualification model (SCS + HCS).
