= International Docking System Standard =

International standard for spacecraft docking adapters

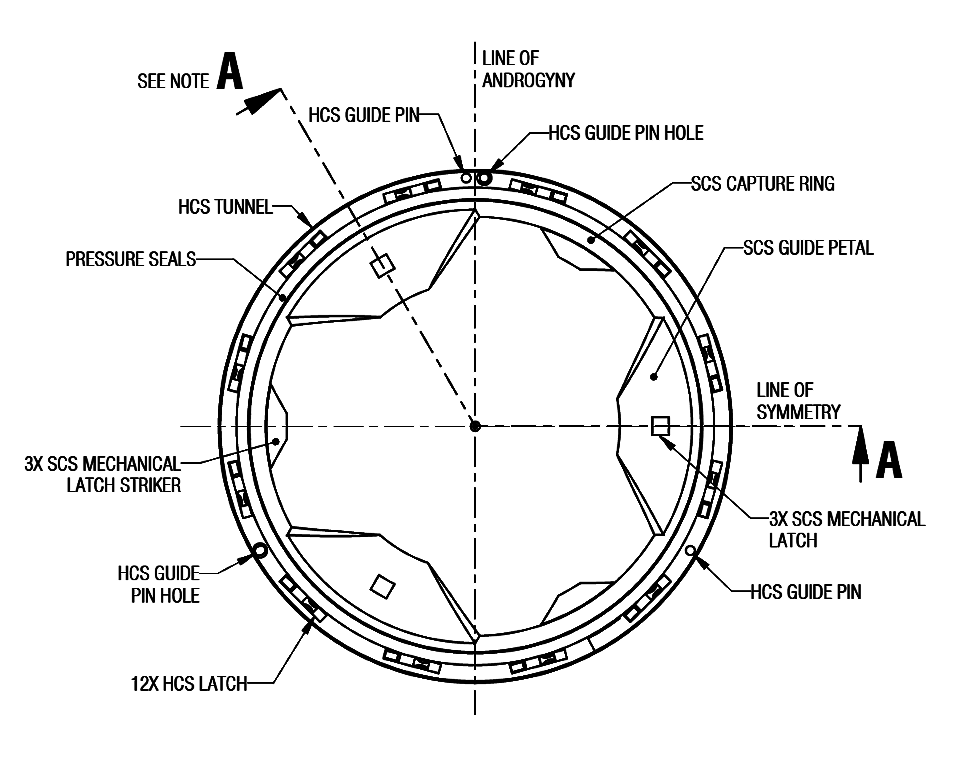
IDSS Rev D

NDS, NASA's implementation of IDSS

The International Docking System Standard (IDSS) is an international standard for spacecraft docking systems. It was created by the International Space Station Multilateral Coordination Board, on behalf of the International Space Station partner organizations; NASA, Roscosmos, JAXA, ESA, and the Canadian Space Agency.

The IDSS was originally formulated in 2010. The plan is for all cooperating agencies to make their future docking systems IDSS compatible.

== Design ==
The IDSS docking mechanism can be androgynous, uses low impact technology, and allows both docking and berthing. It supports both autonomous and piloted docking and features pyrotechnics for contingency undocking. Once mated, the IDSS interface can transfer power, data, commands, air, communication, and in future implementations, will be able to transfer water, fuel, oxidizer and pressurant as well.

The passage for crew and cargo transfer has a diameter of 0.8 meters (31 in).

The IDSS has a 2-phase docking procedure consisting of a soft capture and hard capture system.

=== Active and passive docking roles ===
During a docking maneuver, one vehicle assumes the "active" role and the other vehicle assumes the "passive" role. A particular IDSS port can be manufactured to be able to act in the active role, the passive role, or either role. If a port (e.g., the ones on the ISS) is passive-only, then the other spacecraft must implement the active role. If a port is active-only (e.g., the ports on Crew Dragon and Cargo Dragon, and Starliner), then the other spacecraft must implement the passive role. This means that spacecraft with active-only ports cannot dock with each other using these ports.

=== Soft Capture System ===
The soft capture system (SCS) of the active docking system is extended while the passive system remains retracted. Each SCS includes 3 equally spaced petals around the docking ring. As the spacecraft approach each other, the petals on the SCS align the two docking rings and the two become mechanically latched. 6 servo-actuated legs then remove any relative motion and may begin to retract. The use of the SCS allows for six degrees of freedom, reducing the accuracy requirement of initial docking procedures.

=== Hard Capture System ===
Once soft capture is achieved, the hard capture system (HCS) can begin final structural mating. It consists of 12 pairs of mechanical hooks on both the passive and active port. Guide pins are used to ensure accurate alignment of the docking rings to properly allow the hooks to engage. Once the hooks are fully driven, the docking ports' electrical connectors can begin transferring data and the docking procedure is complete.

== Implementations ==
The NASA Docking System is NASA's implementation of the IDSS. The International Docking Adapter (IDA) converts older Russian APAS-95 docking systems to the International Docking System Standard. IDA implements the passive IDSS role. NASA set June 2016 as the starting date to construct 4 of the NASA Docking System units for the Commercial Crew Development program. Two International Docking Adapters were added to the International Space Station, and another was destroyed on ascent. As of November 2025 these ports have been used during 25 SpaceX Dragon 2 missions and two Boeing Starliner missions.

SpaceX designed and implemented an IDSS port for the Crew and Cargo Dragon 2. The ports implement the active role. It was first used on the Crew Dragon Demo-1 mission in March 2019.

SpaceX is implementing an active/passive IDSS port for Starship HLS based on the active-only port on Dragon 2.

Boeing Starliner uses the NASA Docking System version of IDSS, implementing the active role. It was first used on Boeing Orbital Flight Test 2 in May 2022.

NASA's Orion spacecraft will use the NASA Docking System version of IDSS starting with the Artemis III mission.

The ESA's International Berthing and Docking Mechanism is their IDSS compatible docking system.

Chinese Docking Mechanism conforms to IDSS, according to a National Standards of China published in 2017, GB/T 34512-2017 "Requirement for interface of manned spacecraft peripheral docking mechanism".

ISRO is developing the IDSS-compliant Bhartiya Docking System (BDS) for use in Gaganyaan and the Bharatiya Antariksha Station. They have tested a subscale version of BDS with their SpaDeX mission with successful docking achieved in January 2025.
