= Pressurized Mating Adapter =

Spacecraft docking adapter

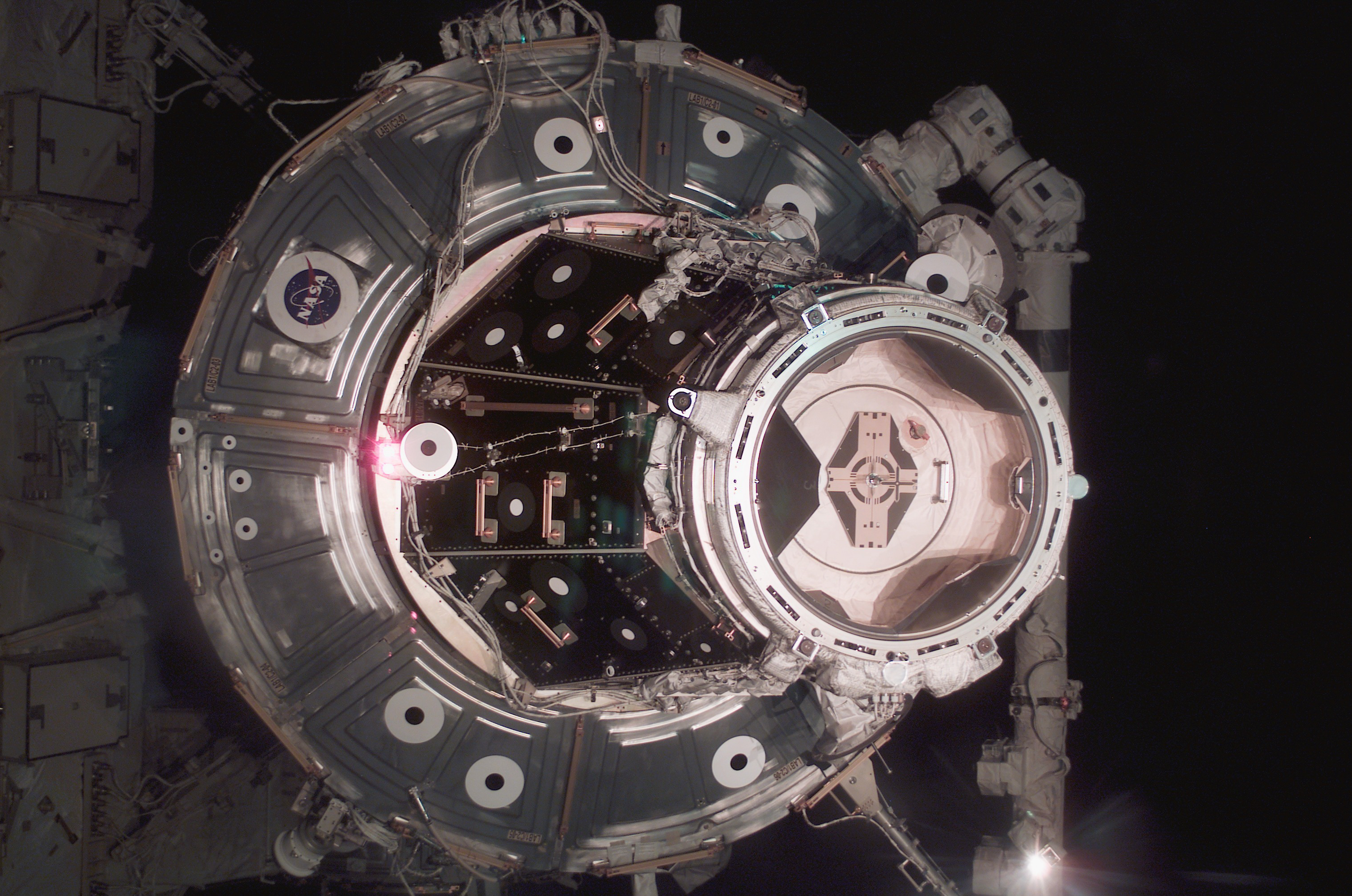
- PMA-2 attached to the forward port of Destiny, where it was located between 2001 and 2007

Module statistics
- Part of: International Space Station
- Launch date: PMA-1 & 2: December 4, 1998; PMA-3: October 11, 2000
- Launch vehicle: Space Shuttle
- Docked: PMA-1 & 2: December 7, 1998; PMA-3: October 13, 2000

A Pressurized Mating Adapter (PMA) is a component used on the International Space Station (ISS) to convert the Common Berthing Mechanism (CBM) interface used to connect ISS modules to an APAS-95 spacecraft docking port. Three PMAs are attached to the US Orbital Segment of ISS. PMA-1 and PMA-2 were launched along with the Unity module in 1998 aboard STS-88; PMA-3 was launched in 2000 aboard STS-92. PMA-1 permanently connects the Unity and Zarya modules. International Docking Adapters were permanently installed on PMA-2 and PMA-3 in 2017 to convert them from the APAS-95 standard to the newer International Docking System Standard (IDSS).

== Design and history ==
Its origins lie in designs for the Pressurized Docking Mast, consisting of an off-axis frustoconical docking tunnel contained within a framework and a retractable coupling mechanism, later part of the Pressurized Berthing Adapter assembly that appeared in designs for Space Station Freedom 1987, and the reduced design referred to as 'Fred' 1991.

After 1992–1993 and the Russian integration into the International Space Station Alpha project, this NASA docking design abruptly disappeared from all concepts. This was due to the availability of Russian docking hardware and experience, brought together during the Shuttle–Mir program. Russian APAS docking technology originally planned for the then defunct Soviet space shuttle program was integrated into the US Space Shuttle ODS (Orbital/Orbiter Docking System). This could hard dock with the space station through a structural interface, which became the PMA. With both the Russian docking ring and the CBM integrated into the PMA, this became the link between the USOS and the ROS from 1993.

Fabrication completed in 1995 with tests and mating tests with Node STA throughout 1996–97.

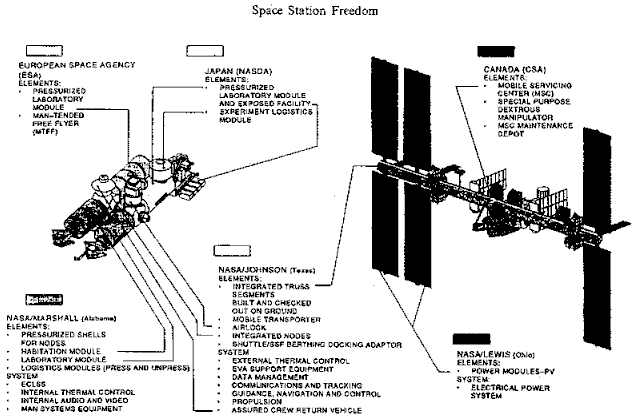
Space Station Freedom configuration 1991

== Uses ==
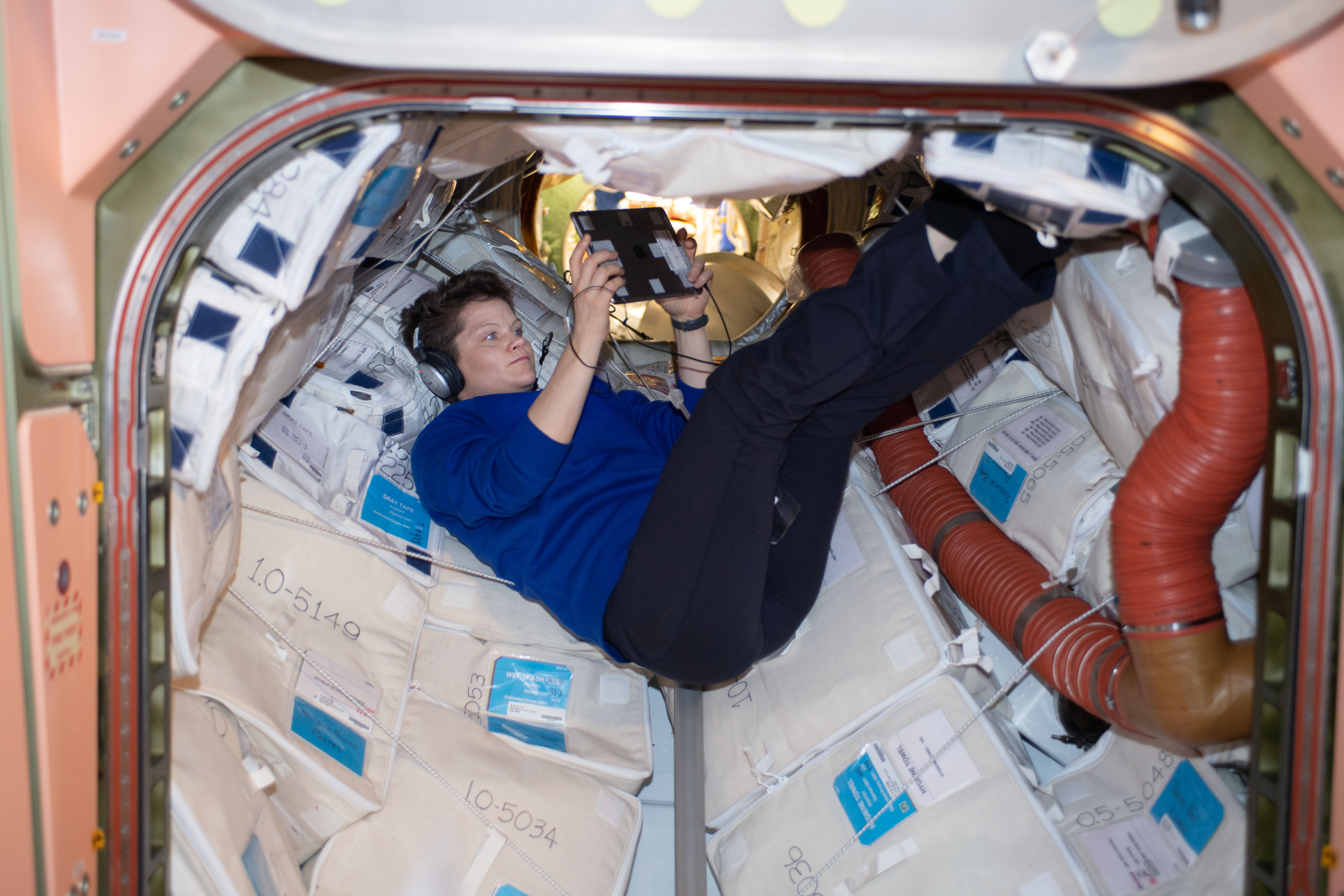
Expedition 58 crew member Anne McClain inside PMA-1, with the interior of Zarya in the background. PMA-1 has served as the bridge between Zarya and Unity since the modules were berthed in 1998.

The three PMAs are identical, but they have slightly different uses. All three perform the same basic function of connecting a CBM port of an ISS module to an APAS-95 docking port of another module or visiting spacecraft. For this purpose, the PMAs carry a passive CBM port and a passive APAS port. The PMAs are pressurized and heated from the inside, and they allow for power and data communications transfer through docking rings and external connections.

=== PMA-1 ===
This was one of the first components of the ISS (International Space Station). PMA-1 joins the Russian side of the station with the US side. On STS-88, the crew used the shuttle's robotic arm to attach the Zarya control module to PMA-1, which was already connected to the aft berthing port of Unity. These first two station components are permanently connected by PMA-1.

=== PMA-2 ===
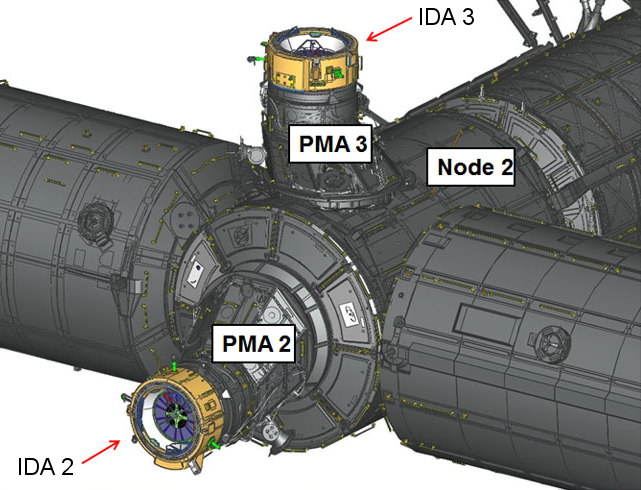
Locations of PMA-2 and PMA-3 on the forward and zenith ports of Harmony, with International Docking Adapters attached to convert the APAS-95 ports to IDSS

PMA-2 is mounted on the forward port of the Harmony connecting node, and was used when Space Shuttle orbiters docked at the ISS. It was outfitted with Station-to-Shuttle Power Transfer System (SSPTS) hardware to allow the shuttles to stay docked longer to the space station.

PMA-2 was moved several times as part of the space station assembly process. It was originally connected to the forward hatch of Unity, but when STS-98 delivered the Destiny module in February 2001, PMA-2 was moved to the berthing ring of the Z1 truss so that Destiny could be berthed to the forward hatch of Unity. PMA-2 was then moved to the forward hatch of Destiny. (The removal of PMA-2 from Unity was the first time the CBM had been used to disconnect two ISS components.) After STS-120 had delivered Harmony to the space station in October 2007, Canadarm2 repositioned PMA-2 at the forward port of Harmony on November 12, 2007. Two days later, the combined package of Harmony and PMA-2 was moved to its final location, the forward hatch of Destiny. On July 18, 2016, International Docking Adapter-2 was launched on SpaceX CRS-9. It was attached and permanently connected to the APAS-95 port of PMA-2 during a spacewalk on August 19, 2016. As of 2020, PMA-2 is expected to stay berthed at the forward port of Harmony with the IDA connected for the remaining duration of the ISS.

When a shuttle docked with the station, its "final approach [was] at a relative velocity of one-tenth of a foot per second. [As it made] contact with Pressurized Mating Adapter 2 [latches] automatically attached the two spacecraft together. Once relative motion between the spacecraft stopped, [a Shuttle astronaut retracted] the docking ring on [the Shuttle's] mechanism, closing latches to firmly secure the shuttle to the station."

=== PMA-3 ===
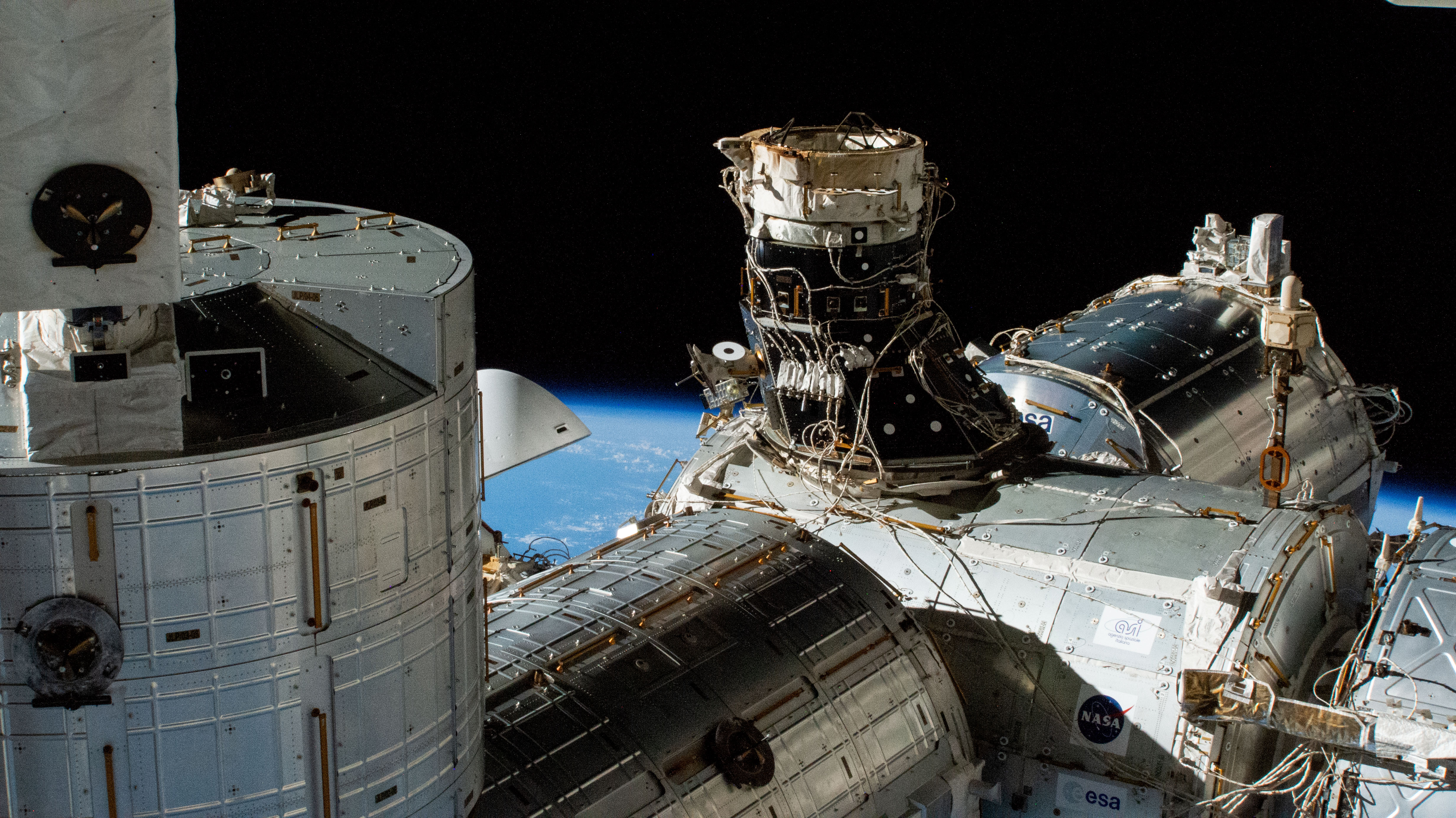
PMA-3 with IDA-3, attached to the zenith berth of the Harmony module, November 2024

PMA-3 was brought to the ISS by STS-92 in October 2000, mounted on a Spacelab pallet. It was initially attached to the nadir (Earth-facing) berth of Unity. About six weeks later, when STS-97 delivered the P6 solar array truss structure, Endeavour docked at PMA-3. When STS-98 moved PMA-2 from Unity to Destiny via the Z1 truss in February 2001, Atlantis was docked at PMA-3. For the remainder of the shuttle's operation, PMA-3 was not used for shuttle dockings. PMA-3 was moved in March 2001 to Unity's port berth by the crew of STS-102 to make room for the docking of the Multi-Purpose Logistics Module (MPLM).

On August 30, 2007, PMA-3 was returned to the nadir port of Unity to make room for the temporary docking of the Harmony (Node 2) module that was delivered by STS-120. Harmony was transferred to the forward port of Destiny, while PMA-3 was moved back to the port berthing mechanism of Unity on August 7, 2009, to accommodate reconfiguration of the Unity port bulkhead by crew members in a pressurized environment. On January 25, 2010, PMA-3 was moved from the port berthing mechanism of Unity to the zenith (space-facing) port of Harmony to make room for the Tranquility (Node 3) module which was added to the station during STS-130. After activation of Tranquility, PMA-3 was moved again on February 16, 2010, to the port location on Tranquility where the Cupola observatory module had been docked for launch.

PMA-3 was robotically removed from Tranquility on March 26, 2017, and again attached to the zenith berth of Harmony after being prepared during a successful spacewalk on March 24, 2017. A second spacewalk was conducted on March 30, 2017, to finalize the PMA-3 cable connections on Harmony. PMA-3 received International Docking Adapter-3 in August 2019.
