= International Space Station Multilateral Coordination Board =

Highest-level cooperative body in the International Space Station programme

The International Space Station Multilateral Coordination Board (MCB) is the highest-level cooperative body in the International Space Station (ISS) programme. It was set up under the memoranda of understanding for the ISS, originally signed in 1998.

The MCB has members from each of the cooperating ISS partner organizations: NASA, Roscosmos, JAXA, the European Space Agency, and the Canadian Space Agency. The MCB sets policies for the ISS, including approving policies such as the Code of Conduct for International Space Station Crews that implement the International Space Station Intergovernmental Agreement that, together with the MOUs, provides the legal basis for the ISS program.

== See also ==
- Space law
