= International Docking Adapter =

Spacecraft docking adapter

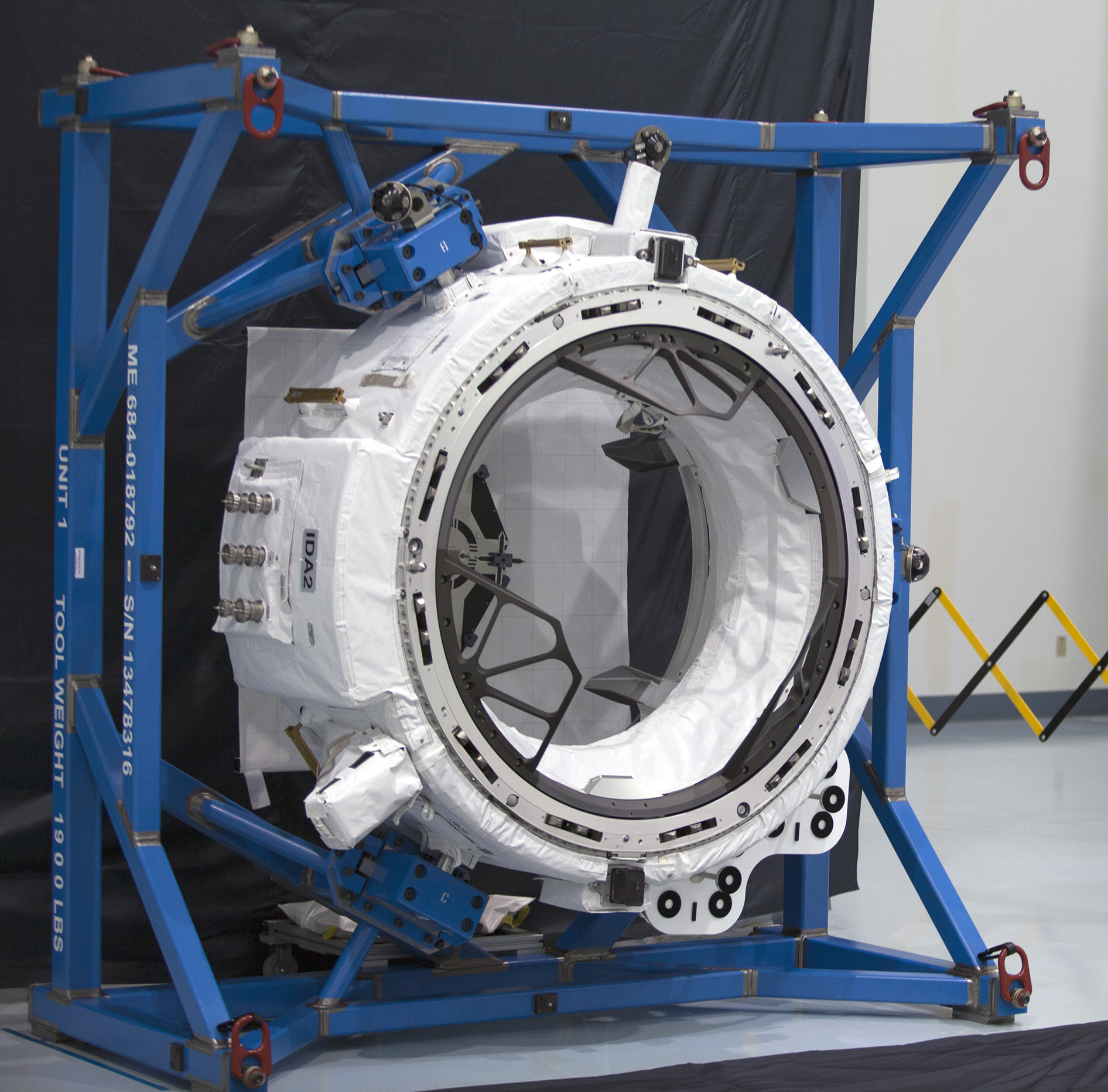
IDA-2 upright

The International Docking Adapter (IDA) is a spacecraft docking system adapter developed to convert APAS-95 to support docking with spacecraft that implement the International Docking System Standard. The IDA uses NASA Docking System (NDS) hardware. An IDA was permanently installed on each of the International Space Station's (ISS) two open Pressurized Mating Adapters (PMAs), both of which are connected to the Harmony module.

== History ==
Prior to IDA several different docking adapters were designed to fill a similar role but were never implemented.

=== APAS to LIDS Adaptor System ===
The APAS to LIDS Adaptor System (ATLAS) was announced in 2008. It would have been placed on the open PMAs and converted APAS-95 to the Low Impact Docking System (LIDS). ATLAS was planned to be launched on Orion's first two missions to the International Space Station. Orion's missions to the ISS were later canceled altogether and its role as a crew transporter was replaced by the Commercial Crew Program.

=== Common Docking Adapter ===
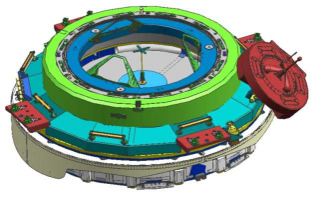
Rendering of the now-cancelled Common Docking Adapter

The Common Docking Adapter (CDA) was announced in 2009. It was planned to be used to convert the Common Berthing Mechanism to the NASA Docking System. The CDAs would have been attached directly to Node-2 forward and Node-2 zenith. They would have been delivered on the Japanese HTV cargo spacecraft.

== Design ==
IDA converts APAS-95 to the NASA Docking System (which complies with the International Docking System Standard) and allows the transfer of crew, cargo, power and data. IDA has a mass of 526 kg (1,160 lb), a height of 110 cm (42 in) and a width of 160 cm (63 in). When including the docking targets, laser retro-reflectors and related systems that are arrayed around the outer perimeters, the outer diameter is about 240 cm (94 in).

Boeing is the primary contractor for the IDAs and the adapters were assembled at their Houston Product Support Center. Parts from subcontractors came from 25 American states and the primary structure is from Russian company RSC Energia.

== Deployment of IDA modules ==
Each IDA was delivered as unpressurized cargo in the trunk of a SpaceX Dragon 1. When each IDA arrived, Dextre removed it from Dragon's trunk and moved it to about 30 cm (1 ft) from the front of the PMA. It then moved the IDA carefully into position until it was seated on the PMA and held it there. Astronauts during an Extravehicular activity then completed the electrical connections and permanently connect it to the PMA.

IDA-1 was planned to be attached to Node-2's forward PMA. IDA-2 was originally planned to be attached to Node-2's zenith PMA. But following the loss of IDA-1, IDA-2 was instead attached to Node-2's forward PMA (PMA-2). IDA-3, a replacement for IDA-1, is installed at Node-2's zenith PMA (PMA-3).

=== IDA-1 ===
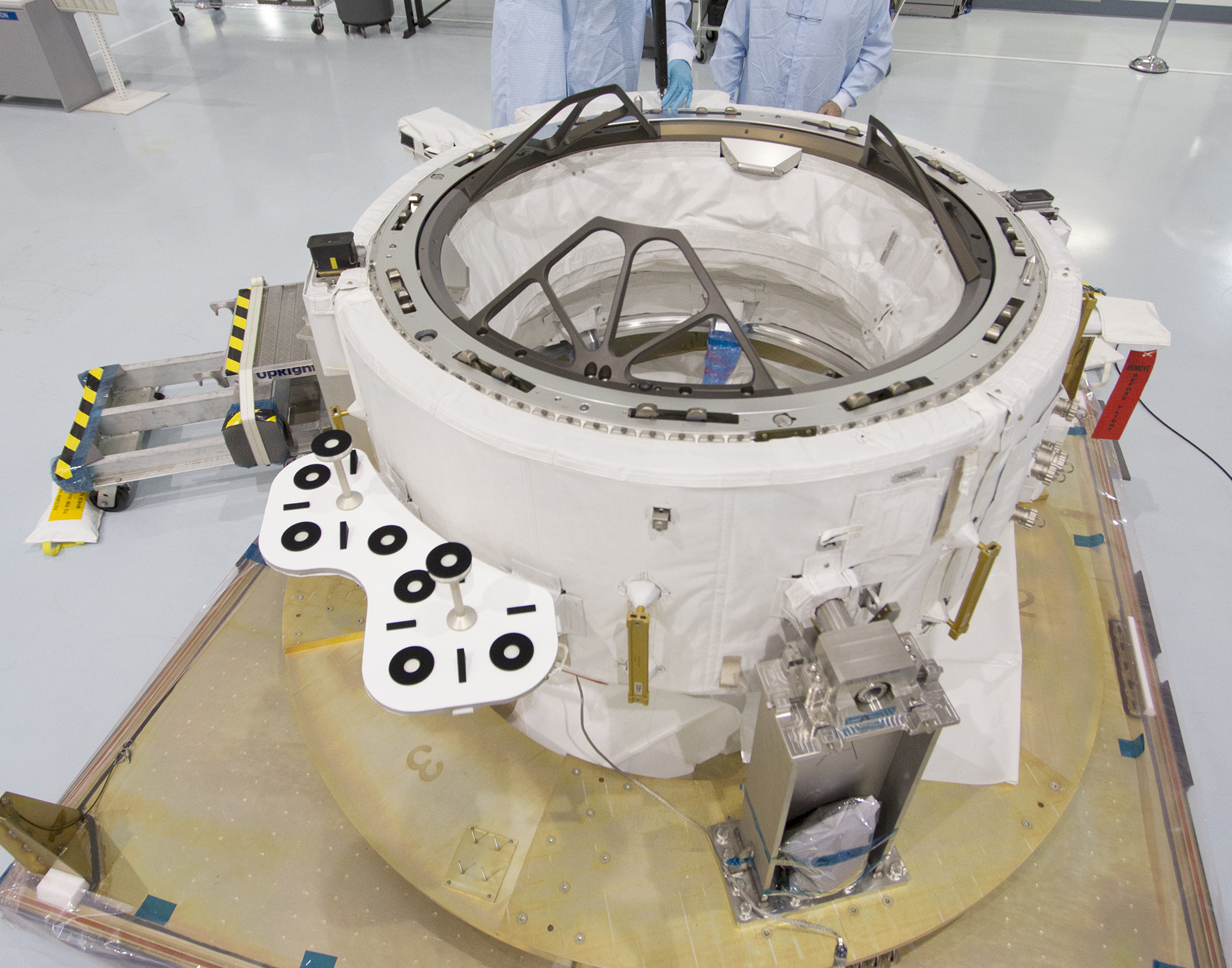
IDA-1 with thermal insulation

In February 2015, IDA-1 had been transported to the Kennedy Space Center while IDA-2 was still at Boeing's Houston facility. The systems and targets for IDA-1 were put through about a month of tests at the Space Station Processing Facility before being loaded for launch.

IDA-1 was lost during the launch failure of SpaceX CRS-7 on 28 June 2015.

=== IDA-2 ===
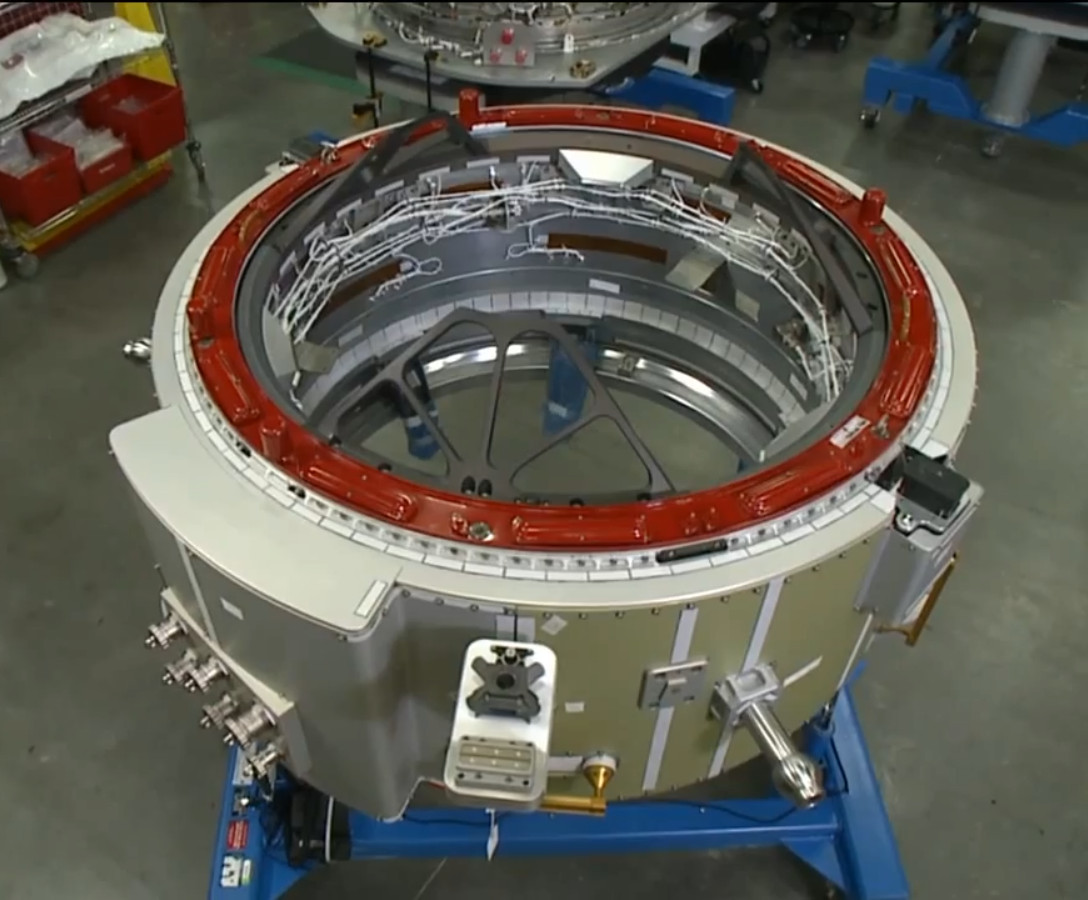
IDA-2 without thermal insulation

IDA-2 was launched on SpaceX CRS-9 on 18 July 2016. It was attached and connected to PMA-2 during a spacewalk on 19 August 2016. First docking was achieved with the arrival of Crew Dragon Demo-1 on 3 March 2019.

=== IDA-3 ===
IDA-3 was launched on the SpaceX CRS-18 mission in July 2019. IDA-3 is constructed mostly from spare parts to speed construction. It was attached and connected to PMA-3 during a spacewalk on 21 August 2019. First docking was achieved with the arrival of SpaceX CRS-21 on 7 December 2020.

== Components ==
According to NASA the IDA, "consists of a Modified APAS (MAPAS) ring, a short tunnel, and an IDA Passive Hard Mate Assembly (PHMA).

== Gallery ==
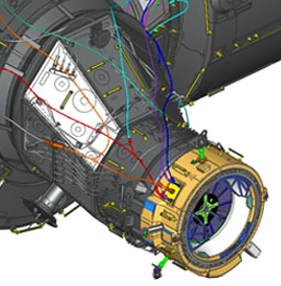
Rendering of IDA connected to the PMA-2

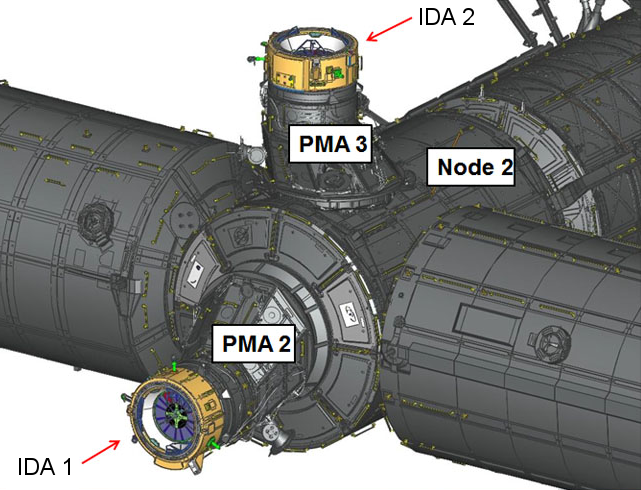
Pre-IDA-1 loss, planned locations of the IDAs

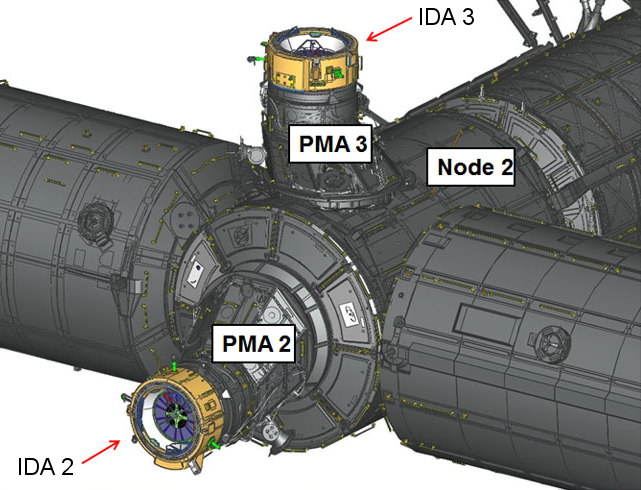
Post-IDA-1 loss, current locations of the IDAs

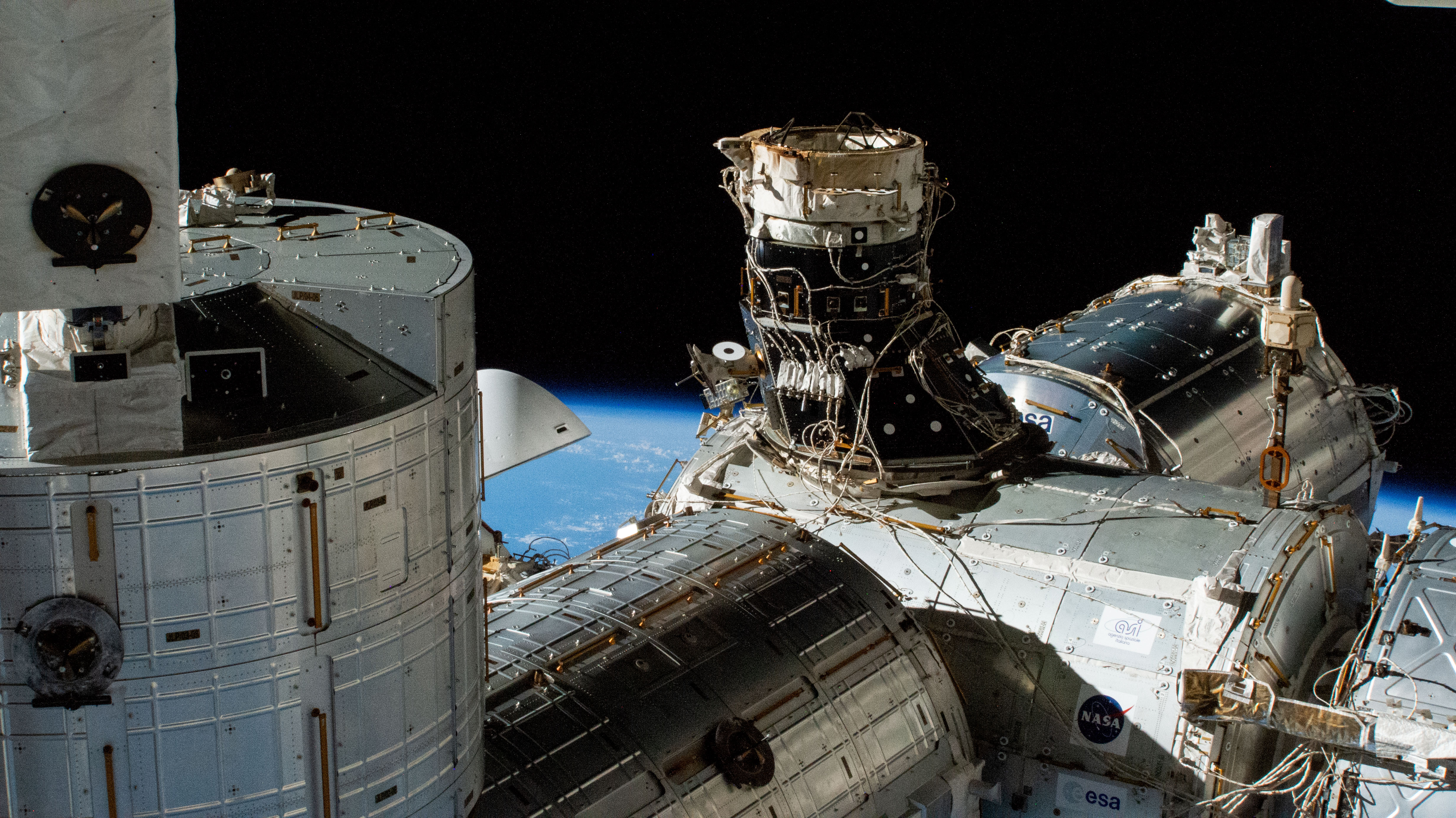
IDA-3 (white) attached to the top of PMA-3 (black), which is attached to the zenith berth of the Harmony module
