= DSX =

DSX may refer to:

- Demonstration and Science Experiments, a small satellite by the Air Force Research Laboratory
- Douala Stock Exchange
- DSX (Andromeda), a fictional type of starship in the television series Andromeda
- dsx, the doublesex gene in fruit flies
- Dongsha Airport, the airport code DSX
