= Falcon 9 B1048 =

Falcon 9 first stage booster

Falcon 9 booster B1048 (United States)

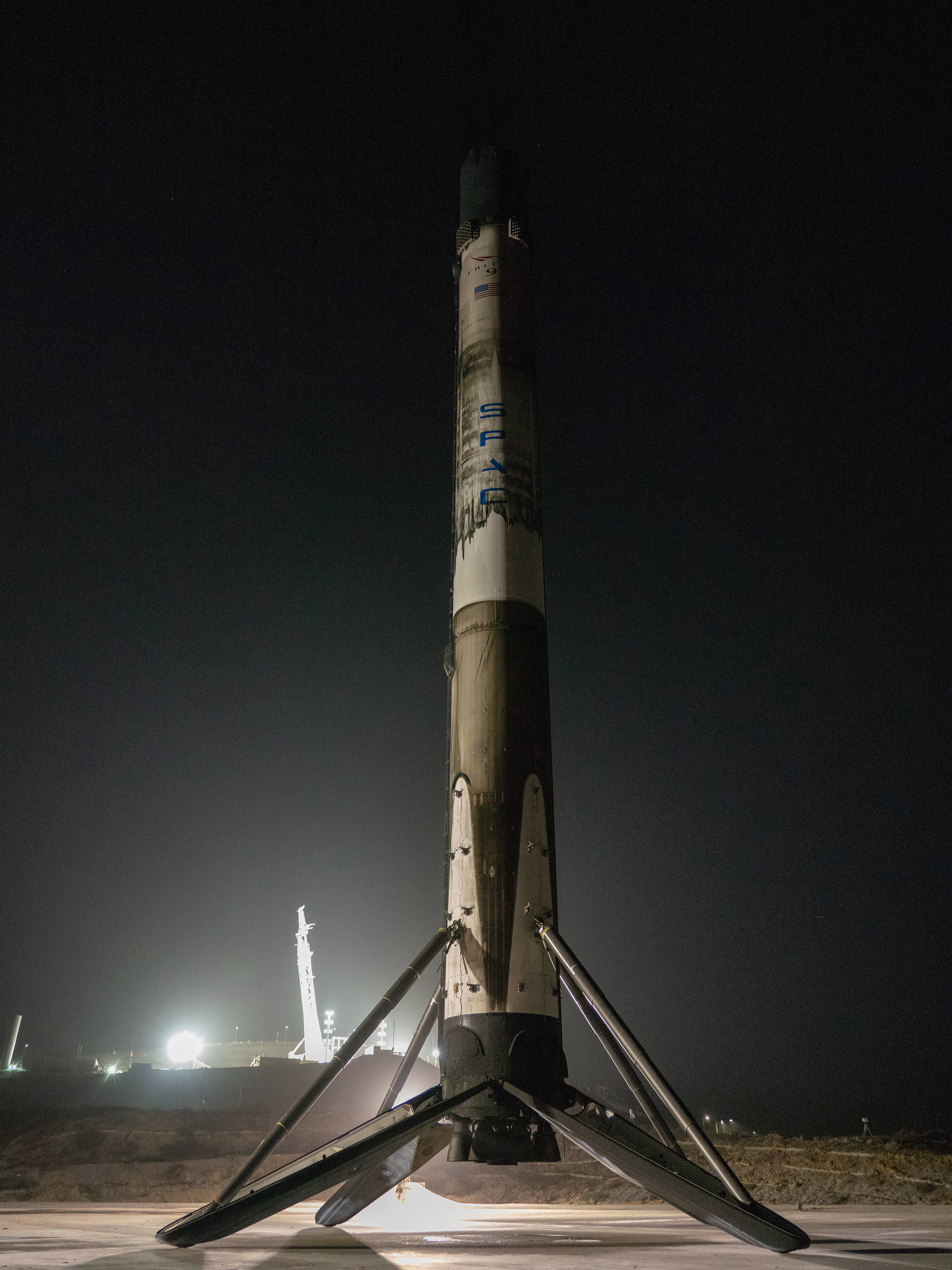
- B1048 following its second landing

General information
- Type: Falcon 9 first-stage booster
- National origin: United States
- Manufacturer: SpaceX
- Status: Destroyed during landing
- Construction number: B1048
- Flights: 5

History
- First flight: 25 July 2018 (Iridium-7)
- Last flight: 18 March 2020 (Starlink L5)

Falcon 9 booster B1048 was a reusable orbital-class Block 5 Falcon 9 first-stage booster manufactured by SpaceX. B1048 was the third Falcon 9 Block 5 to fly and the second Block 5 booster to re-fly. It became the second orbital-class booster to fly a third time and is the first booster ever to be launched five times. B1048 service came to an end on its fifth flight when an engine shut down prematurely on launch. Whilst the primary mission was unaffected and the Starlink payload deployed successfully, B1048 was unable to land. In a subsequent investigation, SpaceX found that isopropyl alcohol, used as cleaning fluid, was trapped and ignited causing the engine to be shut down. To address the issue, in a following launch SpaceX indicated that the cleaning process was not done.

== Flight history ==
First flight

B1048 entered service on 25 July 2018, for the Iridium-7 mission. It was the third Falcon 9 Block 5 to enter service and the first to lift off from the west coast launch site at Vandenberg Air Force Base. The flight marked the 59th flight of the Falcon 9 and the 13th Falcon 9 flight for 2018. The booster lifted off despite the foggy weather and completed the two-and-a-half-minute burn before separating from the second stage and, despite stormy weather and choppy seas making booster recovery unlikely, the booster landed on the west coast Autonomous spaceport drone ship (ASDS) Just Read the Instructions in the roughest seas for a landing attempt at the time. This marked the 5th landing out of 6 landing attempts on JRTI. Fairing recovery was attempted during the flight but failed due to the weather.

Second flight

Despite being the third Block 5 to fly, B1048 was refurbished quicker than the older booster, B1047, and became the second Falcon 9 Block 5 to re-fly. B1048 launched the 62nd Falcon 9 mission for the SAOCOM 1A mission from Vandenberg on October 8, 2018. Due to the twilight effect on launches from the west coast, spectacular views were seen from Los Angeles and other Southern California cities. This mission was historic as it was the first Falcon 9 to perform a RTLS landing on the west coast, landing at LZ-4 just minutes after lifting off.

Third flight

Following landing, B1048 was transported to the east coast and launched the Nusantara Satu mission on February 22, 2019. This marked the second time an orbital-class booster flew three times. The re-entry was the highest re-entry heating to date due to the high energy profile of the mission. This caused the booster to also land further down range than a normal landing. Fairing recovery was planned for the mission but abandoned due to extremely rough weather. Despite the weather making it the hardest landing to date (even rougher than Iridium-7 which B1048 had endured on its maiden flight), B1048 successfully landed on the ASDS Of Course I Still Love You.

Fourth Flight

B1048 was originally scheduled to fly the in-flight abort test of the Crew Dragon; this would have brought B1048 service to an end after her fourth flight. However, this was changed, and B1048 flew the Starlink Mission in November 2019 from SLC-40. On this mission, B1048 became the first Booster to fly four times and also featured for the first time re-used fairings. B1048 successfully landed and returned home for future flights.

Fifth flight

B1048 flew a fifth time in March 2020, breaking the reusability record for Falcon 9. One of the engines shut down early on the ascent, and the booster failed to land. However, the primary Starlink 5 mission to launch 60 Starlink satellites to a low Earth orbit (LEO) was successful.

Flight #	Launch date (UTC)	Mission #	Payload	Pictures	Launch pad	Landing location	Notes
1	July 25, 2018	59	Iridium-7	Iridium-7 Mission (41868222930)	VAFB, SLC-4E	Just Read the Instructions (ASDS)	Third flight of the Block 5 booster and roughest landing conditions for a Falcon 9 at the time
2	October 8, 2018	62	SAOCOM 1A	SAOCOM 1A Mission (45184770841)	VAFB, SLC-4E	LZ-4	Second flight of a Block 5 booster
3	February 22, 2019	68	Nusantara Satu; Beresheet	Nusantara Satu Mission - 47173936181	CCAFS, LC-40	Of Course I Still Love You (ASDS)	Second time a booster is flown three times and the roughest landing condition for a Falcon 9 to date
4	November 11, 2019	75	Starlink L1		CCAFS, LC-40	Of Course I Still Love You (ASDS)	Flight carried 60 Starlink satellites. The first time a Falcon 9 booster has flown four times and the first flight of a reused fairing.
5	March 18, 2020	83	Starlink L5		KSC, 39A	Failure Of Course I Still Love You (ASDS)	Flight carried 60 Starlink satellites. The first time a Falcon 9 booster has flown five times. Engine anomaly during ascent; booster failed to land.

== B1048 records and achievements ==
- First orbital-class booster to fly five times
- First and second flight of a re-used payload fairing (ocean splashdown)
- First booster to land at Landing Zone 4 at Vandenberg Air Force Base, California

== See also ==
- Category:Individual Falcon 9 boosters
- List of Falcon 9 first-stage boosters
- Grasshopper
- Blue Origin New Shepard
- McDonnell Douglas DC-X
