= Falcon 9 B1056 =

Falcon 9 Block 5 first-stage booster

Falcon 9 booster B1056 (United States)

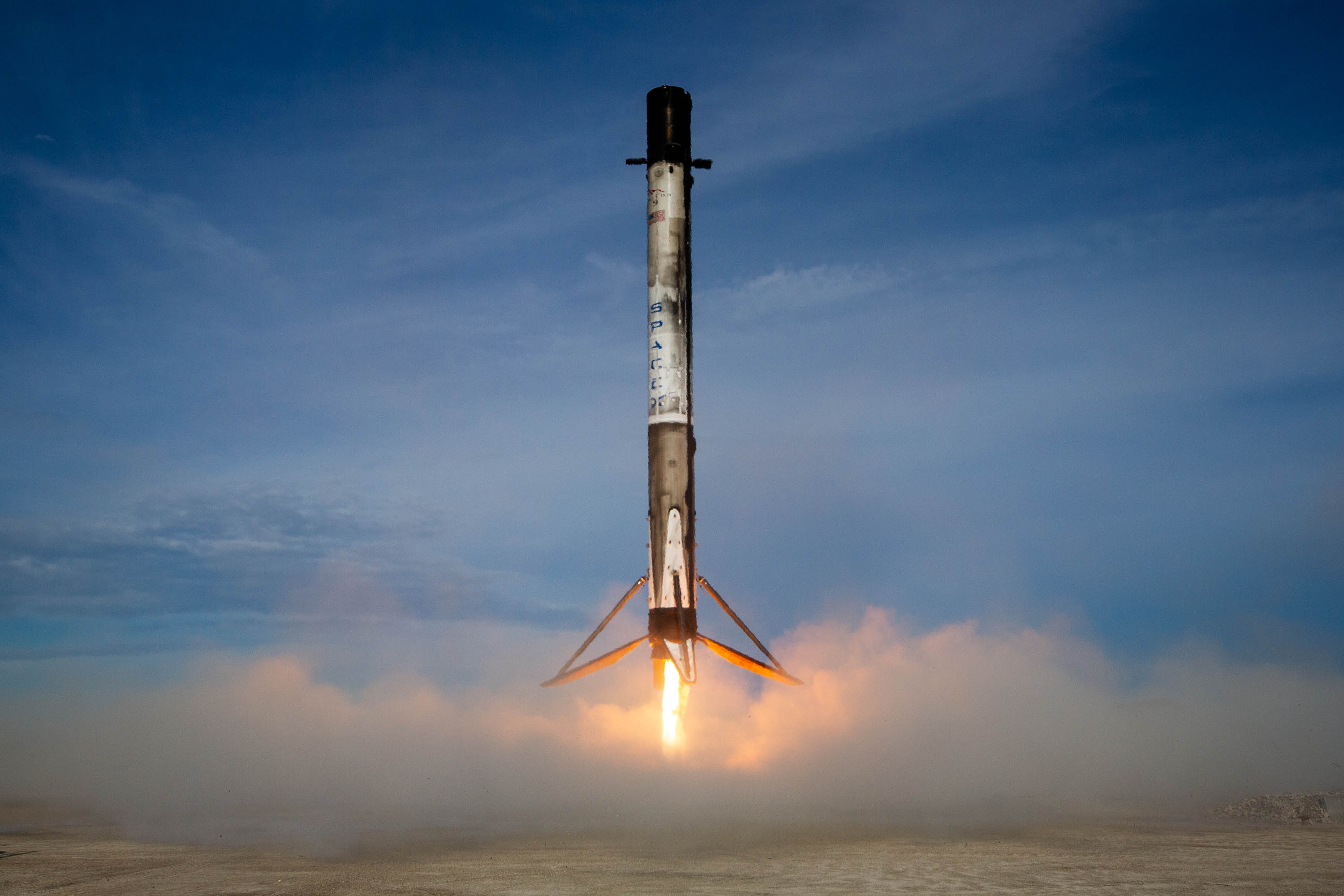
- B1056 lands after launching CRS-18

General information
- Type: Falcon 9 first stage booster
- National origin: United States
- Manufacturer: SpaceX
- Status: Intentionally sunk after surviving a water landing
- Construction number: B1056
- Flights: 4

History
- First flight: 4 May 2019 (CRS-17)
- Last flight: 17 February 2020 (Starlink L4)

Falcon 9 booster B1056 was a reusable Falcon 9 Block 5 first-stage booster manufactured by SpaceX. The booster was the fourth Falcon 9 to fly four times and broke a turnaround record for an orbital class booster on its fourth flight. The booster's service came to an end on its fourth flight following a landing failure on a Starlink flight.

== Flight history ==
First flight

B1056 entered service on May 4, 2019, lofting a Dragon to the International Space Station in support of CRS-17. The vehicle landed aboard the autonomous spaceport drone ship Of Course I Still Love You approximately eight and a half minutes after launch. Normally, first stages supporting CRS missions land at LZ-1, however a failed static fire of a Crew Dragon contaminated the landing pad. This forced B1056 to land just 28 km downrange on OCISLY.

Second flight

On July 25 2019, B1056 launched a second CRS mission, carrying a Dragon to the ISS in support of CRS-18. Following stage separation, B1056 landed at Landing Zone 1 at Cape Canaveral Air Force Station. This flight demonstrated the first time a Dragon spacecraft flew for a third time.

Third flight

B1056 made its third flight on December 16, 2019, carrying JCSAT-18/Kacific-1 to geostationary transfer orbit. About eight minutes after launch, B1056 landed on Of Course I Still Love You - completing its first GTO mission.

Fourth flight

B1056 became the fourth booster to re-fly a fourth time, also breaking a turnaround record, achieving just 63 days between its previous flight. The previous record was held by B1045 for nearly two years. Since then, B1060 and B1058 have both broken the world record previously held by Space Shuttle Atlantis, both with a 27 day turnaround time. The flight was expected to be the 50th successful landing but ended up being the first time a flight-proven booster suffered a landing failure due to incorrect wind prediction. The booster was initially reported to be intact but was subsequently scuttled and did not return to port.

== Launches ==
Flight #	Launch date (UTC)	Mission #	Payload	Pictures	Launch pad	Landing location	Notes
1	May 4, 2019	70	CRS-17		SLC-40	Of Course I Still Love You	Landed on droneship due to contamination of ground pad
2	July 25, 2019	73	CRS-18		SLC-40	LZ-1	Carried the third International Docking Adapter
3	December 16, 2019	77	JCsat-18		SLC-40	Of Course I Still Love You	Originally scheduled to fly on CRS-19, the booster was swapped out for a new booster
4	February 17, 2020	81	Starlink L4		CC-40	Partial Failure Of Course I Still Love You	Flight carrying 60 Starlink satellites. Was the fastest turn around of a booster, breaking the record held by B1045 since June 2018. First flight proven booster to fail landing
