= Orbiting Carbon Observatory 3 =

International Space Station instrument

Orbiting Carbon Observatory-3 (OCO-3)
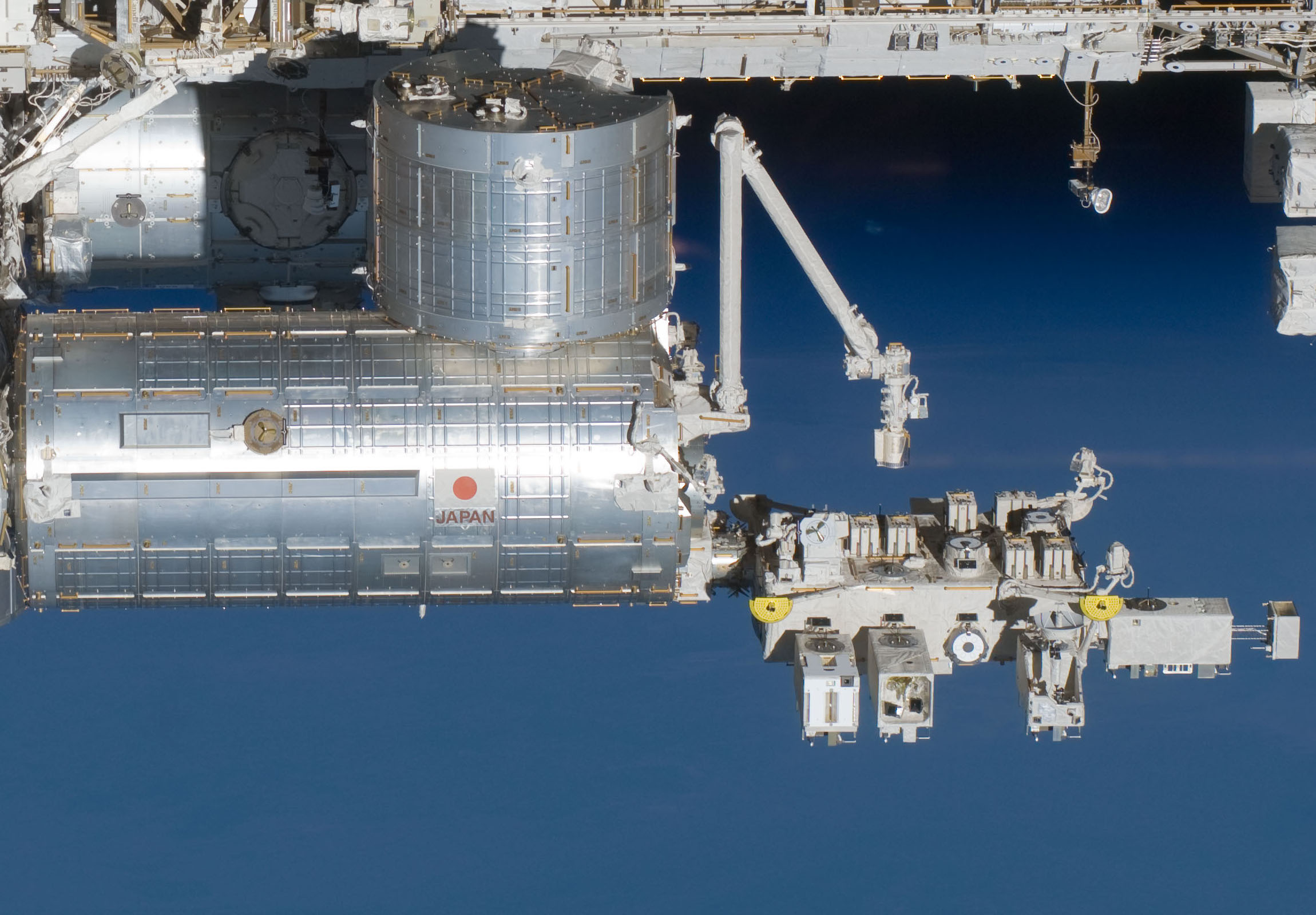
- The Japanese Experiment Module, EFU 3 is the occupied location second from the left.
- Operator: NASA
- Manufacturer: Jet Propulsion Laboratory
- Instrument type: Grating spectrometer
- Function: Atmospheric CO_{2} and SIF
- Mission duration: 10 years (nominal); Elapsed: 7 years, 4 months, 18 days
- Website: www.jpl.nasa.gov/missions/orbiting-carbon-observatory-3-oco-3/

Properties
- Mass: 500 kg (1,100 lb)
- Dimensions: 1.85 × 1.0 × 0.8 m (6.1 × 3.3 × 2.6 ft)
- Power consumption: 600 W
- Resolution: Less than 4 km^{2} (1.5 sq mi)
- Spectral band: 2.06 microns 1.61 microns 0.765 microns
- Data rate: 8 footprints, 3 Hz (24 per second)

Host spacecraft
- Spacecraft: International Space Station
- Launch date: 4 May 2019, 06:48 UTC
- Rocket: Falcon 9
- Launch site: Cape Canaveral, SLC-40

The Orbiting Carbon Observatory-3 (OCO-3) is a NASA-JPL instrument designed to measure carbon dioxide in Earth's atmosphere. The instrument is mounted on the Japanese Experiment Module-Exposed Facility on board the International Space Station (ISS). OCO-3 was launched as part of CRS-17 on 4 May 2019 at 06:48 UTC. The nominal mission lifetime is ten years.

OCO-3 was assembled using spare materials from the Orbiting Carbon Observatory-2 satellite. Because the OCO-3 instrument is similar to the OCO-2 instrument, it is expected to have similar performance with its measurements used to quantify CO_{2} to 1 ppm precision or better at 3 Hz.

== History and timeline ==
- 24 February 2009 - Orbiting Carbon Observatory was launched on a Taurus XL rocket but failed to achieve orbit when the fairing failed to separate from the satellite.
- 1 February 2010 - The 2010 President's budget included funding for development and re-flight of an OCO replacement.
- October 2010 - The Orbiting Carbon Observatory-2 project went into implementation phase.
- 2 July 2014 - OCO-2 was successfully launched from Vandenberg Air Force Base with a Delta II rocket.
- 2015 - Funding for the OCO-3 project cancelled.
- 22 December 2015 - OCO-3 project authorized to proceed. Funding was included in the 2016 spending bill.
- 16 March 2017 - OCO-3 was not included in the proposed FY2018 presidential budget.
- 23 March 2018 - Funding for the OCO-3 project was restored.
- May 2018 - Instrument underwent TVAC testing.
- 4 May 2019 - Launched using a Falcon 9 rocket from Cape Canaveral Air Force Station. The delivery was part of SpaceX CRS-17, which also included delivery of STP-H6 and a cargo resupply.
- After arrival - Robotic installation onto Exposed Facility Unit 3 (EFU 3) on the JEM-EF.

In August 2026, NASA selected Caltech to operate both Orbiting Carbon Observatories - OCO 2 and OCO-3 for up to five years. NASA would remain owner for both the missions, while Caltech would operate the missions and science data systems, including creating new data products.

== Instrument design ==
OCO-3 is constructed from spare equipment from the OCO-2 mission. Thus its physical characteristics are similar, but with some adaptations. A 2-axis pointing mirror was added, which will allow targeting of cities and other areas on order of 100 by 100 km (62 by 62 mi) for area mapping (also called "snapshot mode"). A 100 m (330 ft) resolution context camera was also added. An onboard cryocooler will maintain detector temperatures of around −120 °C (−184 °F). Entrance optics were modified to maintain a similar ground footprint to OCO-2.

Similar to OCO and OCO-2, the main measurement will be of reflected near-IR sunlight. Grating spectrometers separate incoming light energy into different components of the electromagnetic spectrum (or wavelengths or "colors"). Because CO_{2} and molecular oxygen absorb light at specific wavelengths, the signal or absorption levels at different wavelengths provide information on the amount of gases. Three bands are used called Weak CO_{2} (around 1.6 μm), Strong CO_{2} (around 2.0 μm), and Oxygen-A (around 0.76 μm). There are 1,016 spectral elements per band, and measurements are made simultaneously at 8 side-by-side locations or "footprints" each about 4 km^{2} (1.5 sq mi) or smaller, 3 times per second.

== Expected data use ==
Overall measurements from OCO-3 will help quantify sources and sinks of carbon dioxide from terrestrial ecosystems, the oceans, and from anthropogenic sources. Due to the ISS orbit, measurements will be made at latitudes less than 52°. Data from OCO-3 are expected to significantly improve understanding of global emissions from human activities, for example, using measurements over cities. Near simultaneous observations from other instruments onboard the International Space Station such as ECOSTRESS (measuring plant temperatures) and Global Ecosystem Dynamics Investigation lidar (measuring forest structure) may be combined with OCO-3 observations to help improve the understanding of the terrestrial ecosystem. Similar to OCO-2, OCO-3 will also measure Solar Induced Fluorescence which is a process that occurs during plant photosynthesis.

== See also ==
- Greenhouse Gases Observing Satellite
- Space-based measurements of carbon dioxide
- Total Carbon Column Observing Network
