= CondoSat =

A CondoSat is a satellite that supports separate operator payloads on the same spacecraft bus.

A condosat is designed to carry multiple payloads from customers that do not want the direct responsibility of satellite operations. The name derives from real estate condominium. They are a variation of the hosted payload concept whereby an operator enables a satellite to host payloads from multiple parties while meeting their on-orbit operations requirements centrally.
