= SpaceX CRS-17 =

2019 American resupply spaceflight to the ISS

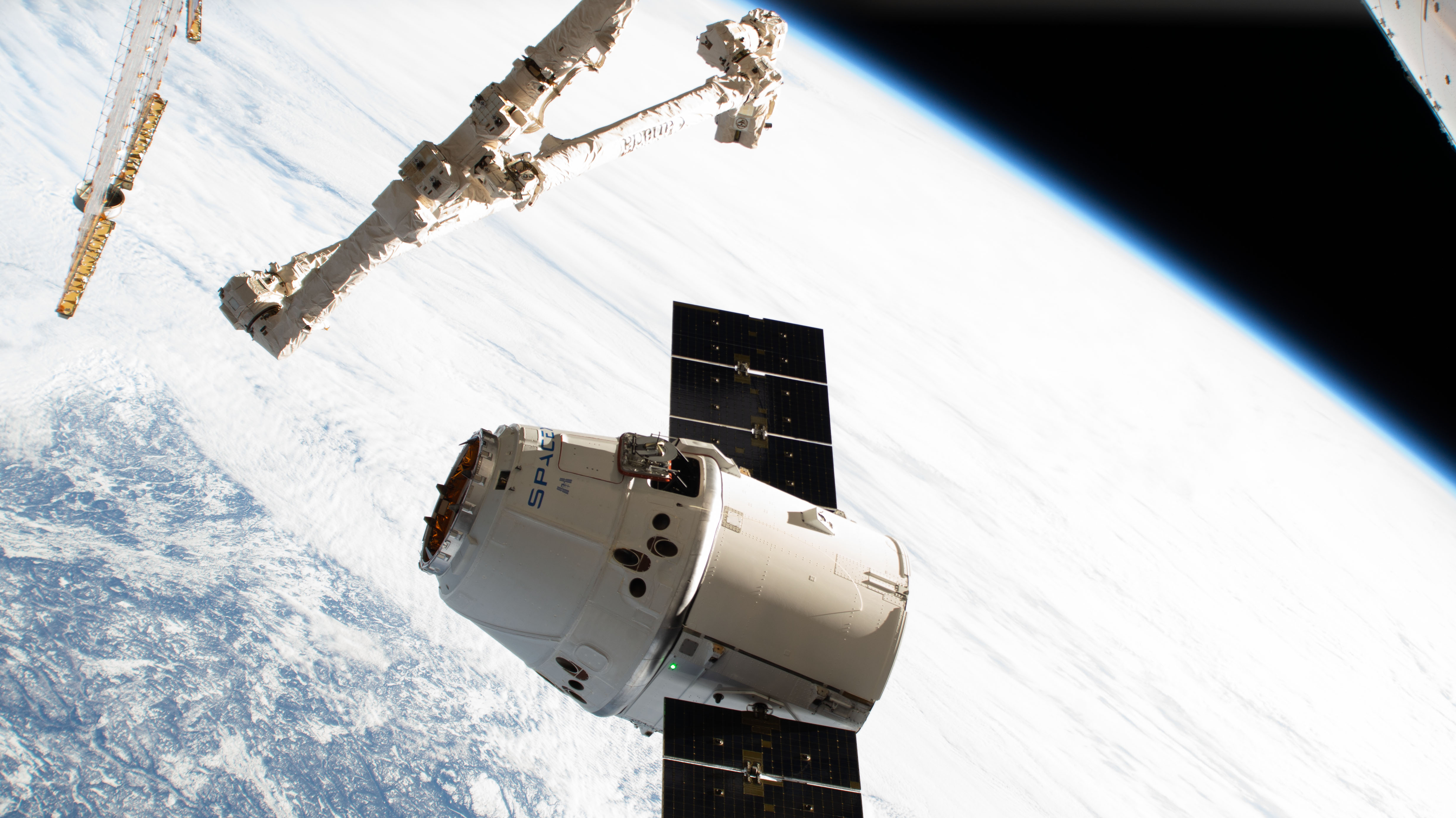
- The SpaceX CRS-17 Dragon approaching to the ISS for RMS capture.
- Names: SpX-17
- Mission type: ISS resupply
- Operator: SpaceX
- COSPAR ID: 2019-025A
- SATCAT no.: 44222
- Mission duration: 30 days, 14 hours, 22 minutes

Spacecraft properties
- Spacecraft: Dragon 1 C113
- Spacecraft type: Dragon 1
- Manufacturer: SpaceX
- Dry mass: 4,200 kg (9,300 lb)
- Payload mass: 2,482 kg (5,472 lb)
- Dimensions: Height: 6.1 m (20 ft); Diameter: 3.7 m (12 ft)

Start of mission
- Launch date: 4 May 2019, 06:48 UTC
- Rocket: Falcon 9 Block 5 (B1056-1)
- Launch site: Cape Canaveral, SLC-40

End of mission
- Disposal: Recovered
- Landing date: 3 June 2019, 21:10 UTC
- Landing site: Pacific Ocean off Baja California

Orbital parameters
- Reference system: Geocentric
- Regime: Low Earth
- Inclination: 51.6°

Berthing at ISS
- Berthing port: Harmony nadir
- RMS capture: 6 May 2019, 11:04 UTC
- Berthing date: 6 May 2019, 13:33 UTC
- Unberthing date: 3 June 2019
- RMS release: 3 June 2019, 16:01 UTC
- Time berthed: 27 days
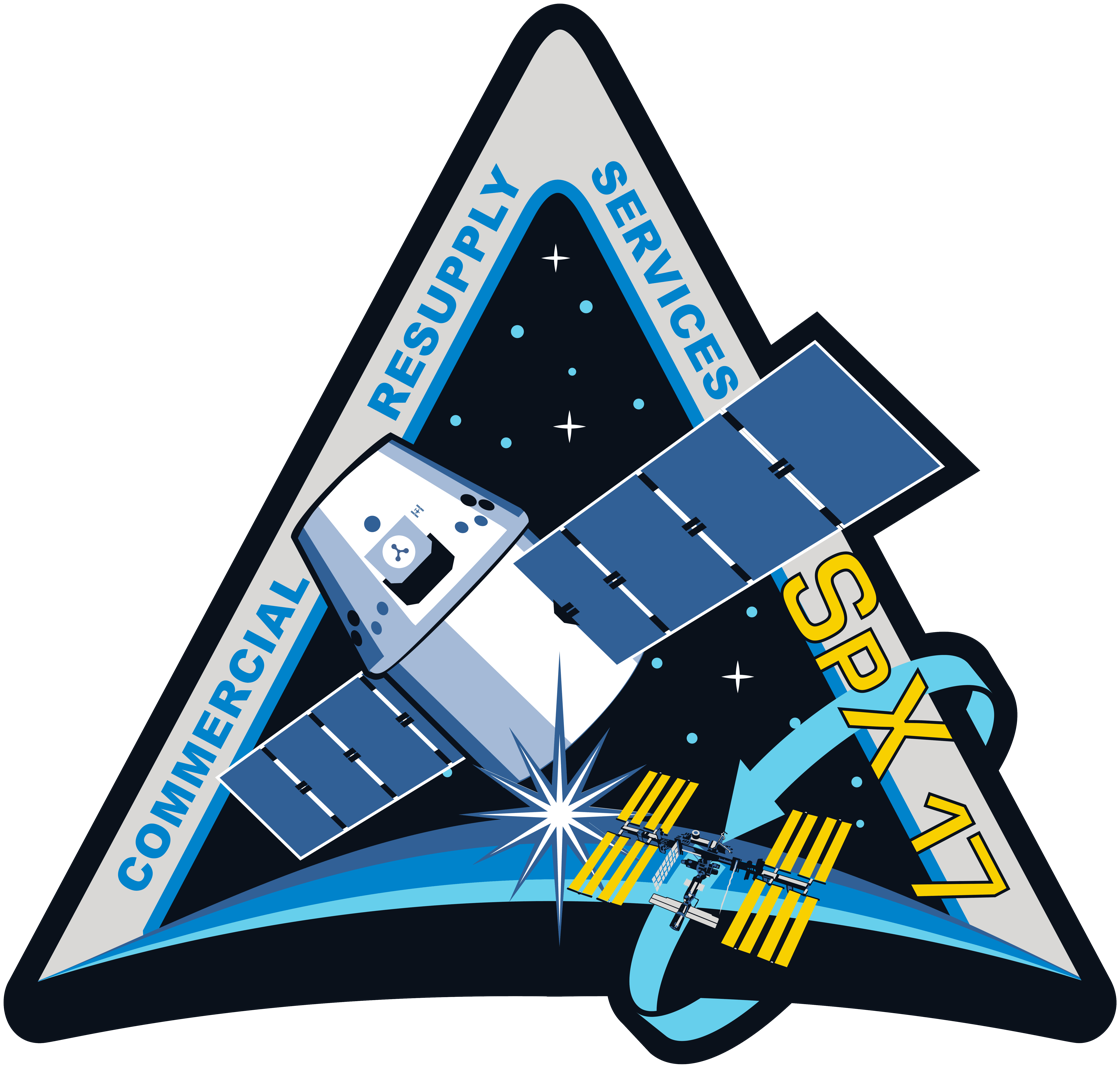
- NASA SpX-17 mission patch Commercial Resupply Services Cargo Dragon

SpaceX CRS-17, also known as SpX-17, was a Commercial Resupply Services mission (CRS) to the International Space Station that was launched aboard a Falcon 9 rocket on 4 May 2019. The mission was contracted by NASA and was flown by SpaceX. An umbilical connection from the strongback remained attached to the spacecraft and is visible in photos taken of it approaching & attached to the ISS.

== Launch schedule history ==
In February 2016, it was announced that NASA had awarded a contract extension to SpaceX for five additional CRS missions (CRS-16 to CRS-20). In June 2016, a NASA Inspector General report had this mission manifested for October 2018, but by January 2019 this had been pushed back to April 2019.

Due to a Dragon 2 test anomaly on 20 April 2019, SpaceX needed to acquire a permit to allow landing on the drone ship, "Of Course I Still Love You". The ship was stationed just 28 kilometres (17 mi) downrange "to ensure the integrity of the area and preserve valuable information".

The scheduled launch on 30 April 2019 was delayed to 3 May, due to problems with the space station's electrical power system. This launch was further delayed to 4 May due to electrical issues aboard Of Course I Still Love You.

== Primary payload ==
Total weight of the cargo on the CRS-17 mission was 2,482 kg (5,472 lb), consisting of 1,517 kg (3,344 lb) in the pressurized section and 965 kg in the unpressurized section.

Cargo in unpressurized section included the Orbiting Carbon Observatory 3 (OCO-3) and STP-H6.

== Gallery ==
SpaceX CRS-17
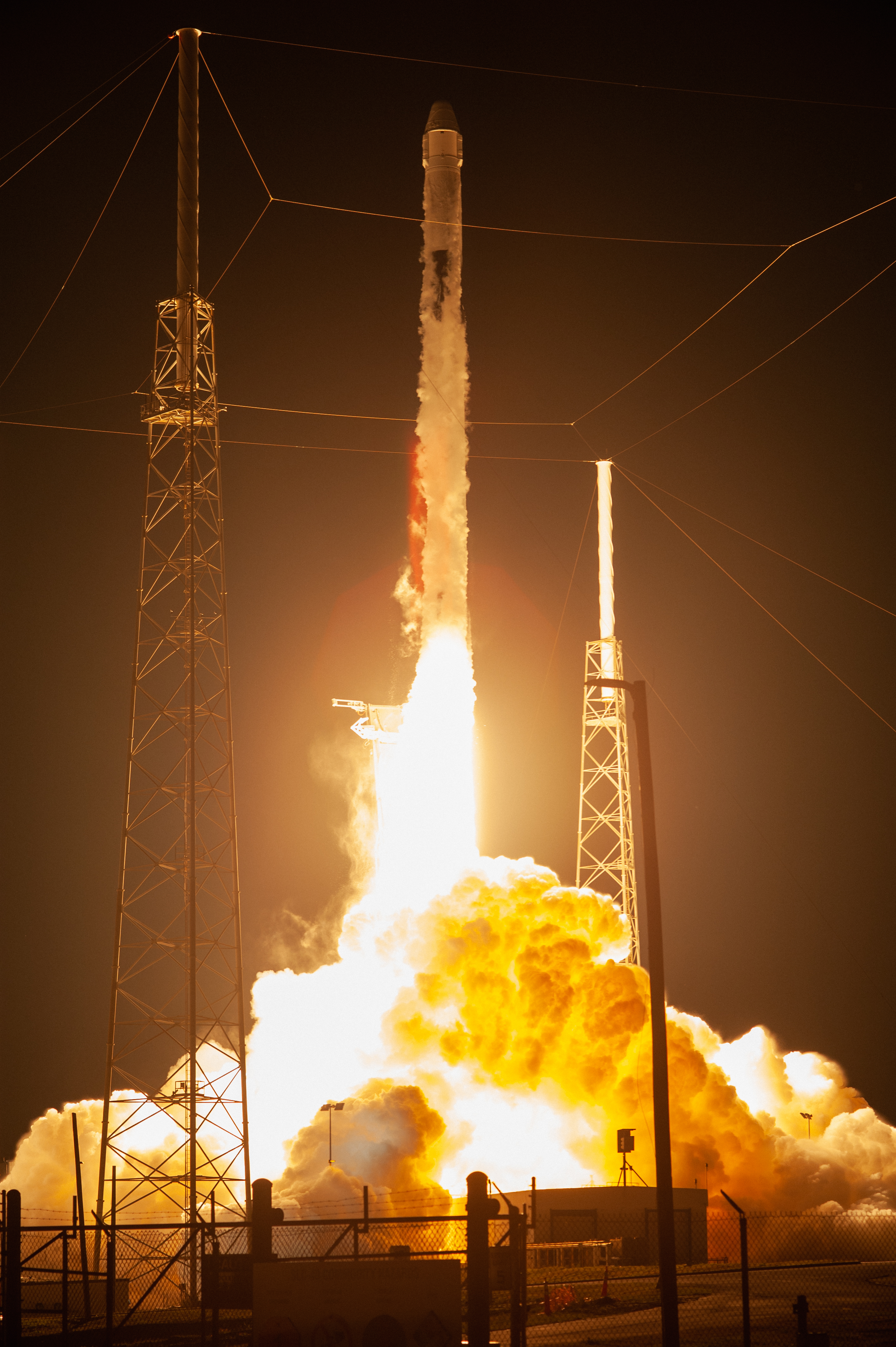
Launch of CRS-17

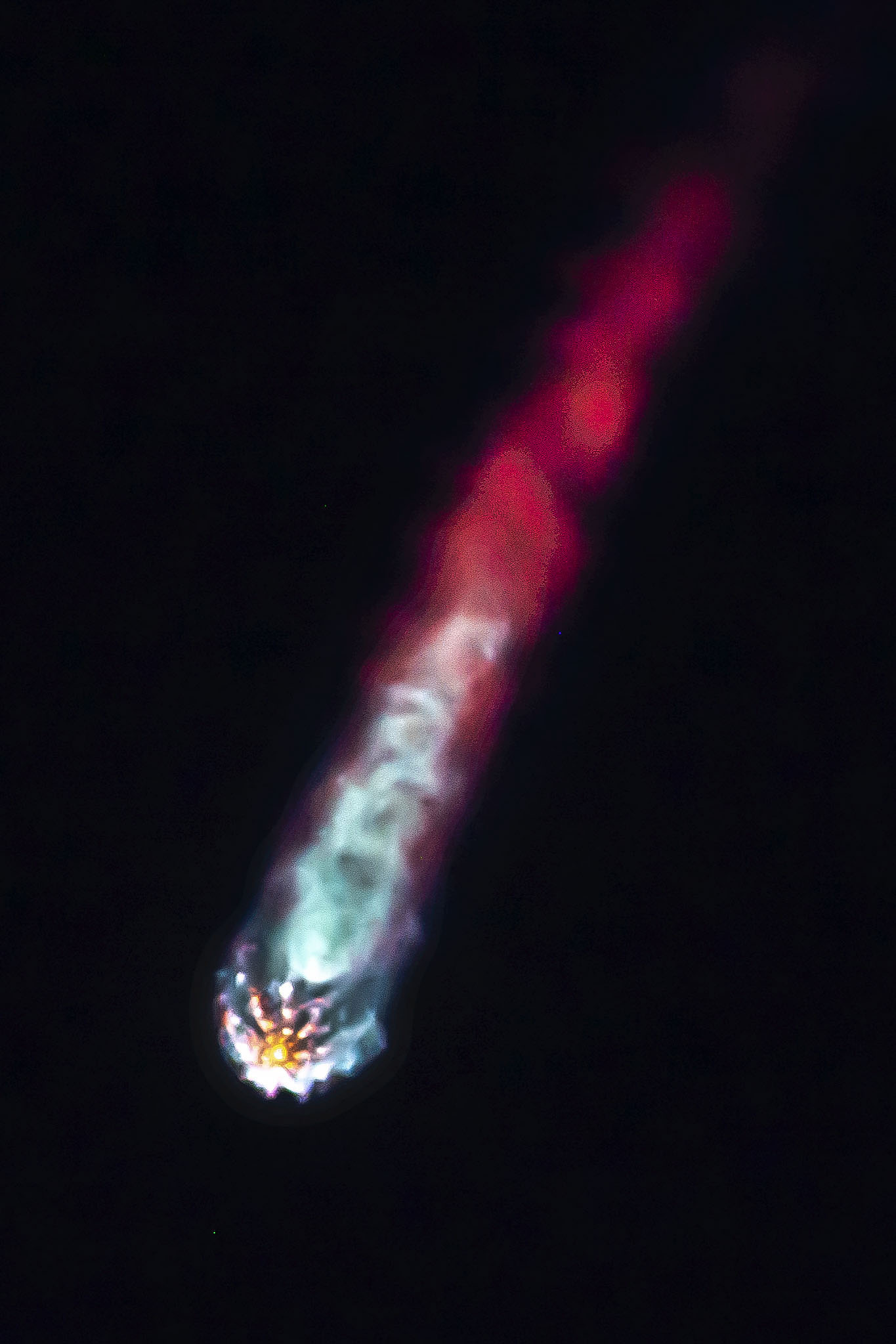
Falcon 9 exiting the atmosphere

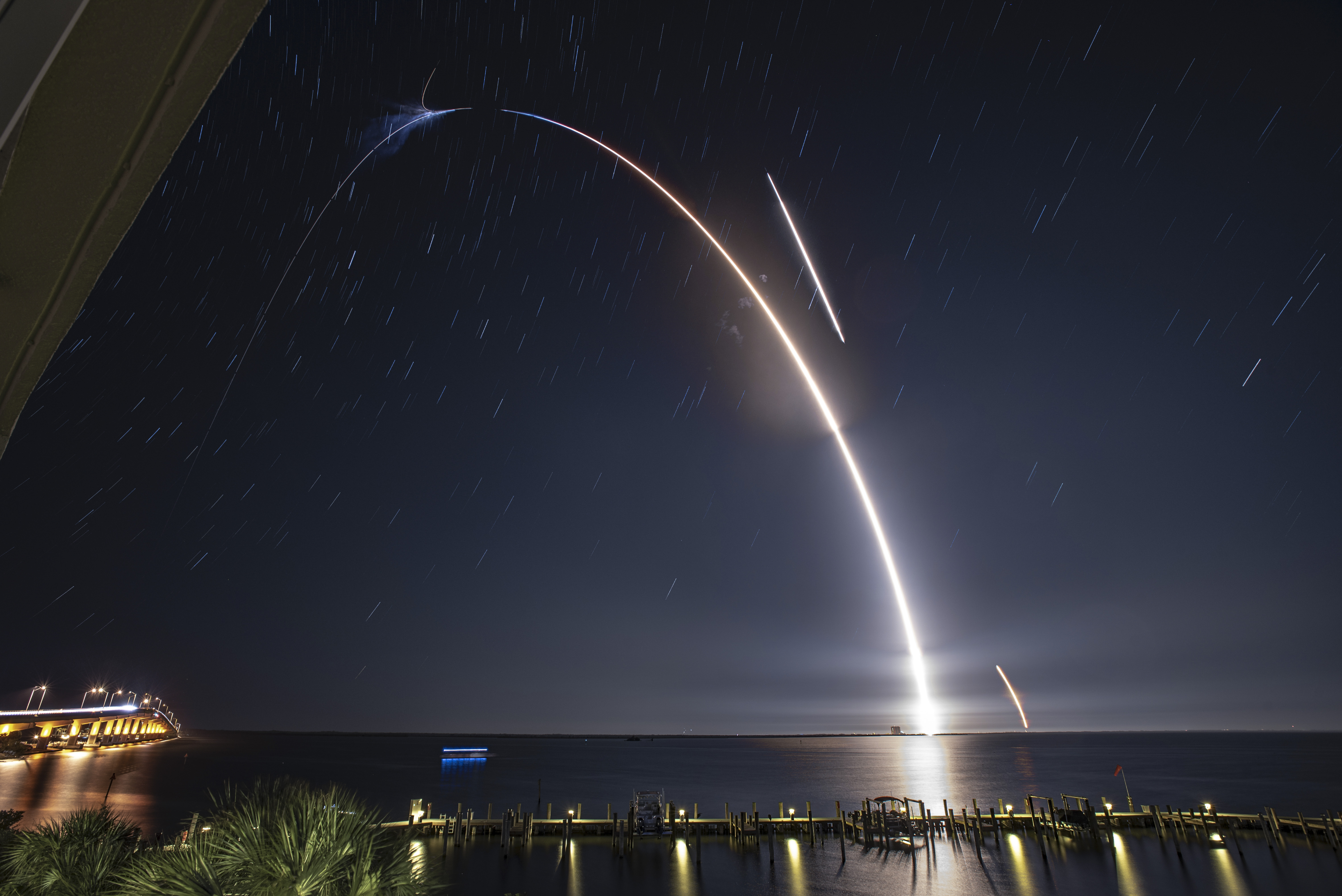
Long exposure image of launch

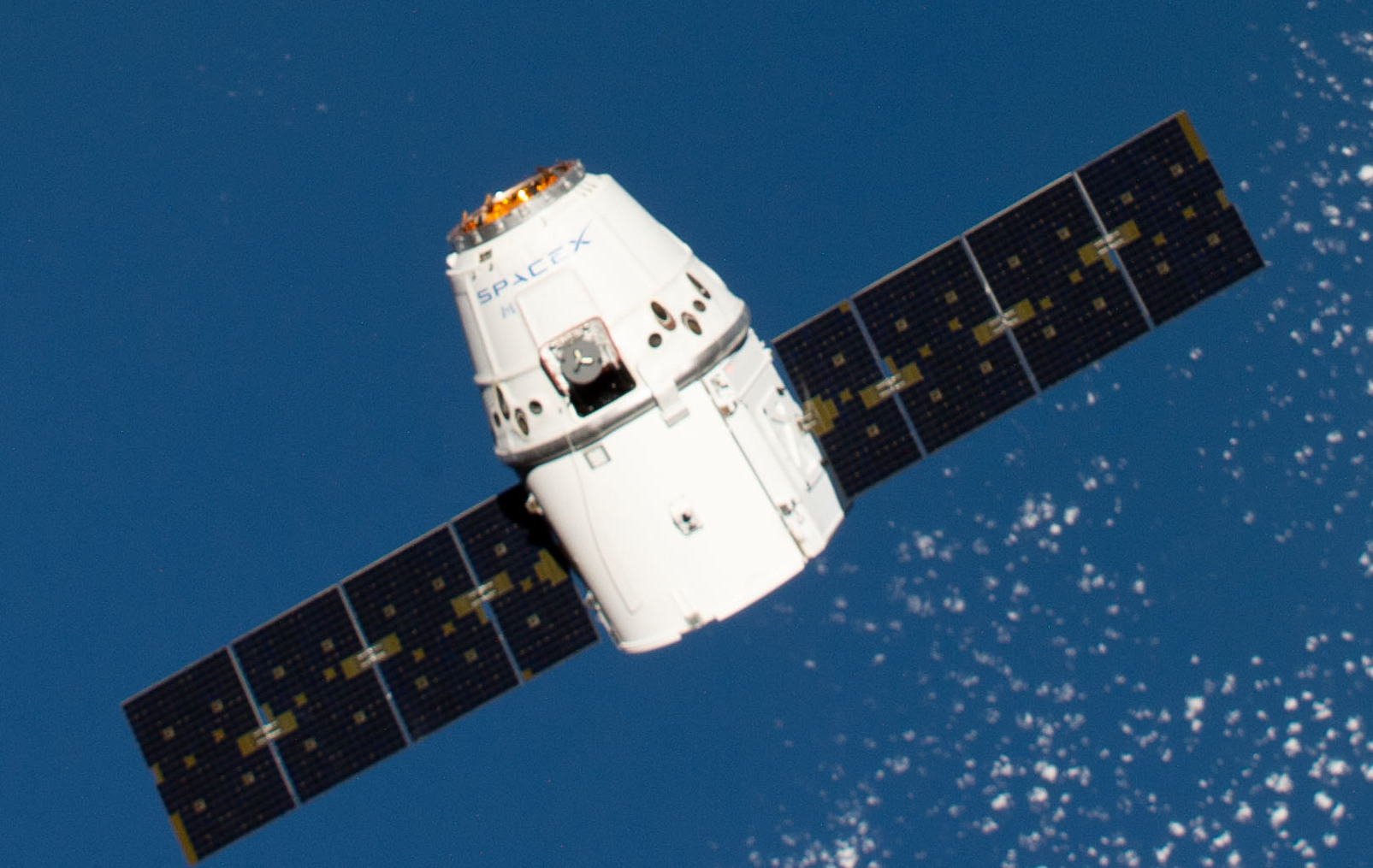
Dragon approaches the ISS

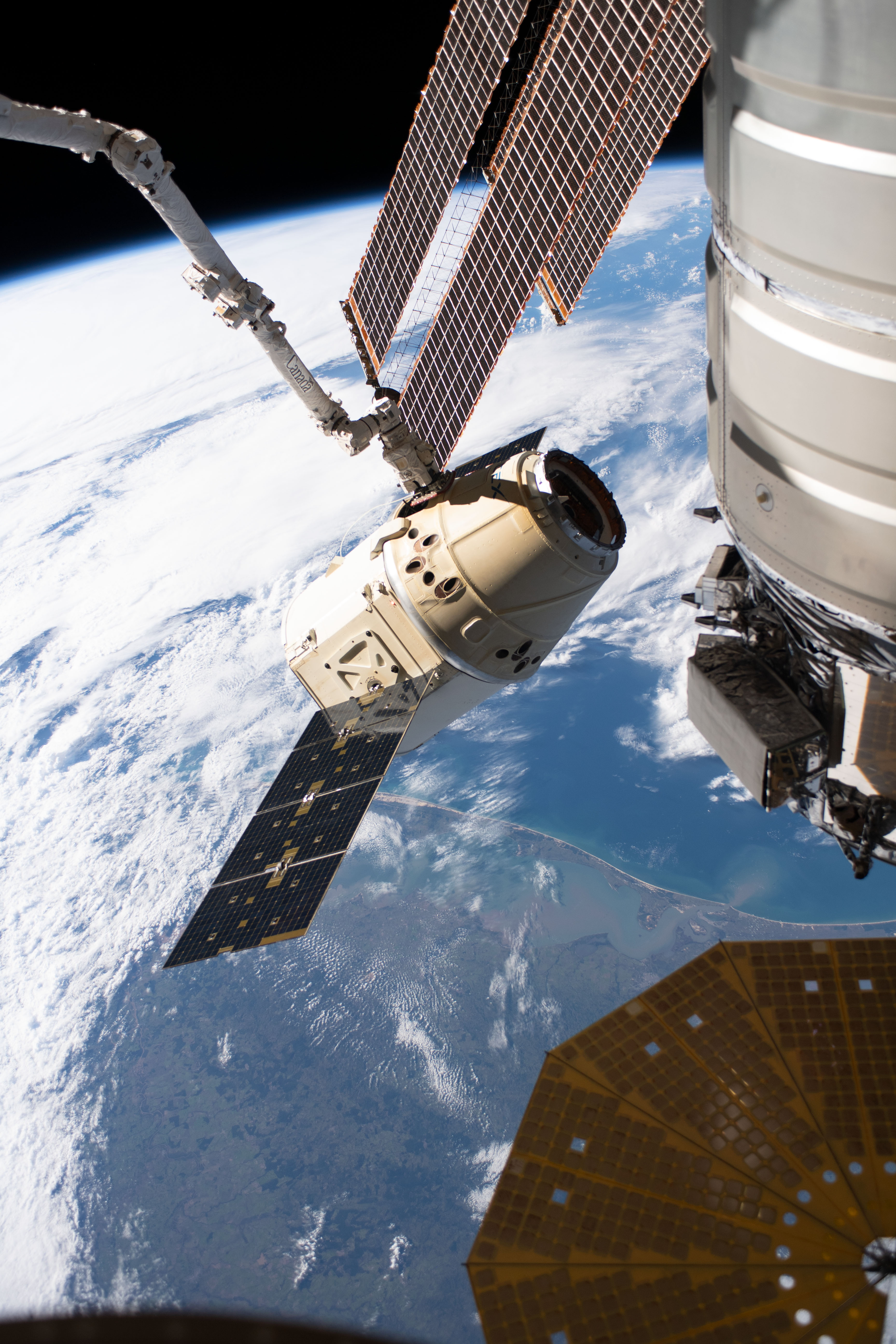
Dragon grappled by the ISS

== See also ==
- Uncrewed spaceflights to the International Space Station
