= Demonstration and Science Experiments =

Spacecraft

DSX
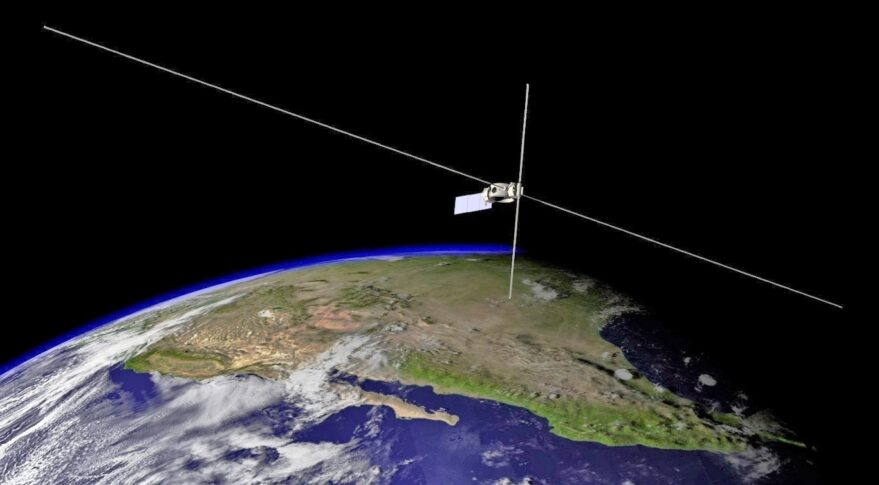
- Artist rendering of the Air Force Research Laboratory Demonstration and Science Experiments (DSX) spacecraft on-orbit with its 80-meter and 16-meter antenna booms extended.
- Names: Demonstration and Science Experiments; Deployable Structures Experiment
- Mission type: Technology demonstration
- Operator: Air Force Research Laboratory
- COSPAR ID: 2019-036F
- SATCAT no.: 44344
- Website: https://www.afrl.af.mil/
- Mission duration: 1 year (planned); 1 year, 11 months and 6 days (achieved)

Spacecraft properties
- Bus: ESPA ring + 2 SN-200
- Manufacturer: Sierra Nevada Corporation (formerly MicroSat Systems)

Start of mission
- Launch date: 25 June 2019, 06:30:00 UTC
- Rocket: Falcon Heavy (No. 003)
- Launch site: Kennedy Space Center, LC-39A
- Contractor: SpaceX

End of mission
- Disposal: Passivated
- Deactivated: 31 May 2021

Orbital parameters
- Reference system: Geocentric orbit
- Regime: Medium Earth orbit
- Perigee altitude: 5,988 km (3,721 mi)
- Apogee altitude: 12,051 km (7,488 mi)
- Inclination: 42.3°
- Period: 316.9 minutes

Instruments
- Wave Particle Interaction Experiment (WPIx); Space Weather Experiment (SPx); Space Environmental Effects Experiment (SFx); Adaptive Controls Experiment (ACE)

Demonstration and Science Experiments (DSX) was a small spacecraft developed by the U.S. Air Force Research Laboratory's Space Vehicles Directorate to perform experiments to study the radiation environment in medium Earth orbit.

== Spacecraft ==
The Air Force Research Laboratory (AFRL) is responsible for the development and execution of the DSX (originally Deployable Structures Experiment), now Demonstration & Science Experiments, also known as Space Science Technology Experiment (SSTE-4), a suite of four science payloads integrated onto a Evolved Expendable Launch Vehicle (EELV) EELV Secondary Payload Adapter (ESPA) ring based three axis stabilized satellite bus nominally slated for launch into a 6000 × 12000 km, 30° inclination, Medium Earth Orbit (MEO) in the 2019 timeframe with one year required and three year desired operational capability.

Unlike the traditional ESPA approach, in DSX the experiments and host spacecraft stay attached and do not deploy. After the primary satellite in the EELV is deployed, the DSX ESPA separates from the EELV 2nd stage booster to become a free-flyer spacecraft. To address the space access aspect of the rapid-response problem, DSX will utilize an EELV Secondary Payload Adapter (ESPA) capability as a platform for highly-capable small and medium free-flying satellites (or ESPASats) that have plentiful and relatively inexpensive launch opportunities on EELV as secondary payloads.

One deployable boom measured 80 meters and a second measured 16 meters, making DSX one of the largest deployable structures built to operate on orbit.

== Payload ==
DSX conducted four experiments:

- Wave Particle Interaction Experiment (WPIx)
- Space Weather Experiment (PWx)
- Space Environmental Effects Experiment (SFx)
- Adaptive Controls Experiment (ACE)

== Mission ==
AFRL kept the satellite in operation for nearly two years, rather than the one year planned, using it to conduct more than 1,300 experiments.

The DSX mission was successfully completed on 31 May 2021. The spacecraft was passivated rather than deorbited due to its high orbit.
