= Ms. Tree =

Ms. Tree may refer to:

- Ms. Tree (comic book), a 1980s–90s comic book series
- Ms. Tree (ship), a space-related maritime vessel used for payload fairing recovery following atmospheric reentry
