= SpaceX reusable launch system development program =

Effort by SpaceX to make rockets that can fly multiple times

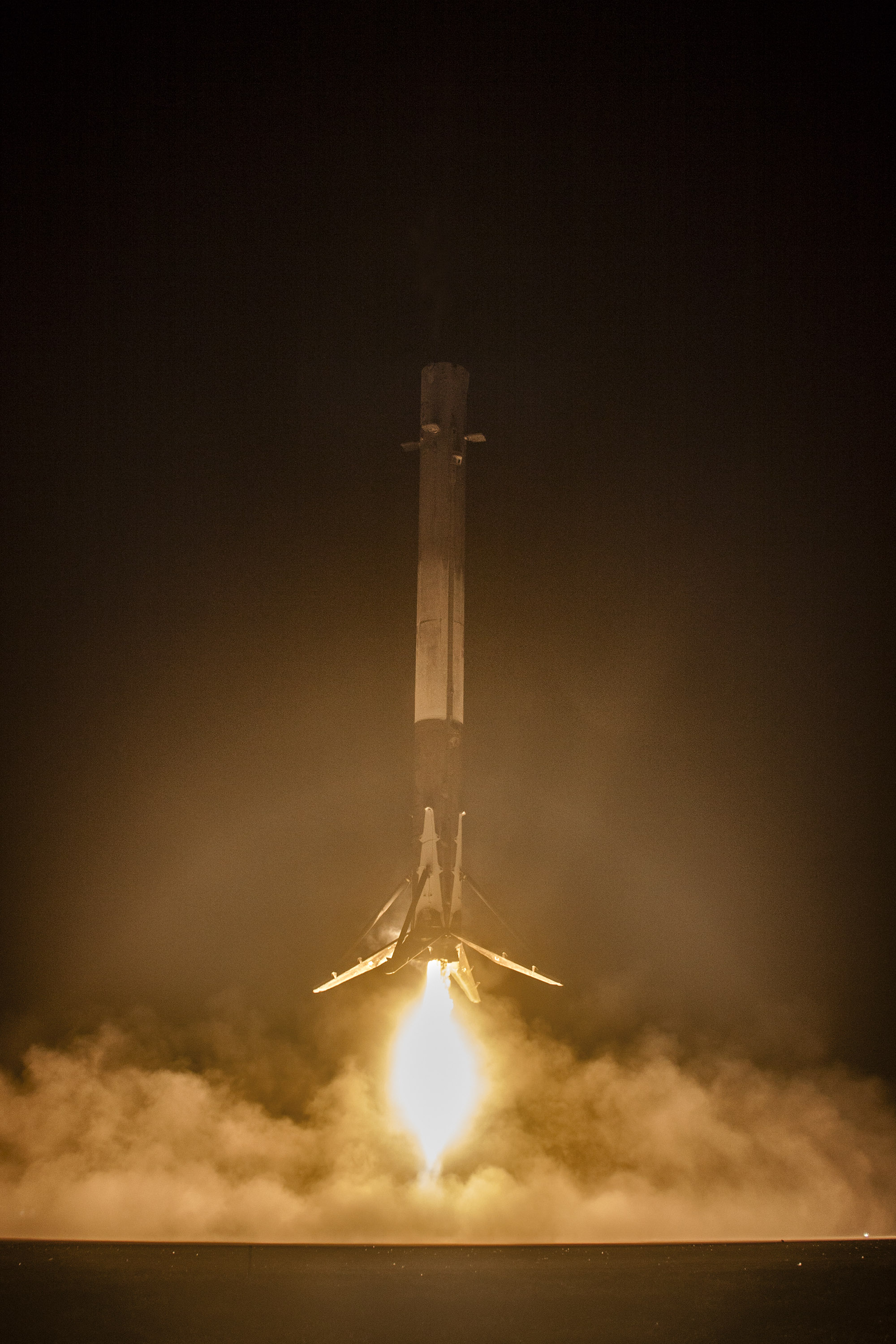
- Falcon 9 Flight 20's first stage (Full Thrust B1019) landing vertically on Landing Zone 1 in December 2015

Program overview
- Country: United States
- Organization: SpaceX
- Purpose: Reusable launch system
- Status: Active

Program history
- Duration: 2011–present
- First flight: SpaceX CRS-3
- Launch sites: Cape Canaveral SLC-40; Kennedy Space Center LC-39A; Vandenberg SLC-4E

Vehicle information
- Launch vehicles: Falcon 9; Falcon Heavy; Starship

SpaceX has privately funded the development of orbital launch systems that can be reused many times, similar to the reusability of aircraft. SpaceX has developed technologies since the 2010s to facilitate full and rapid reuse of space launch vehicles. The project's long-term objectives include returning a launch vehicle first stage to the launch site within minutes and to return a second stage to the launch pad, following orbital realignment with the launch site and atmospheric reentry in up to 24 hours. SpaceX's long term goal is reusability of both stages of their orbital launch vehicles, and the first stage would be designed to allow reuse a few hours after return. While development of reusable second stages for Falcon 9 was later abandoned in favor of Starship, SpaceX developed reusable payload fairings for the Falcon 9.

The program was announced in 2011. SpaceX first achieved a successful landing and recovery of a first stage in December 2015. The first re-flight of a landed first stage occurred in March 2017 with the second occurring in June 2017, only five months after the maiden flight of the booster. The third attempt occurred in October 2017 with the SES-11/EchoStar-105 mission. Reflights of refurbished first stages then became routine. In May 2021, B1051 became the first booster to launch ten missions.

The reusable launch system technology was initially developed for the first stage of Falcon 9. After stage separation, the booster flips around (an optional boostback burn reverses its course), a reentry burn sheds gravity-induced speed to prevent stage overheating as the spacecraft reenters the thicker part of the atmosphere, and a landing burn accomplishes the final low-altitude deceleration and touchdown.

SpaceX planned since at least 2014 to develop reusable second stages, a more challenging engineering problem because the vehicle is traveling at orbital velocity. Second stage reuse is considered vital to Elon Musk's plans for settlement of Mars. Initial concepts for a reusable Falcon 9 second stage were abandoned by 2018.

As of 2023, SpaceX is developing the Starship system to be a fully-reusable two-stage launch vehicle, intended to replace all of its other launch vehicles and spacecraft for satellite delivery and human transport—Falcon 9, Falcon Heavy, and Dragon—and eventually support flights to the Moon and Mars. It could theoretically be used for rapid point-to-point transportation on Earth.

== History ==
From left to right, Falcon 1, Falcon 9 v1.0, three versions of Falcon 9 v1.1, three versions of Falcon 9 v1.2 (Full Thrust), three versions of Falcon 9 Block 5, Falcon Heavy, three versions of Falcon Heavy Block 5 and Starship Block 1. The SpaceX reusable rocket technology is being developed for Falcon 9 v1.2, Falcon Heavy and Starship.

SpaceX attempted to land the first stage of the Falcon 1 by parachute, but the stage did not survive atmosphere re-entry. They continued to experiment unsuccessfully with parachutes on the earliest Falcon 9 flights after 2010. SpaceX subsequently switched to developing a powered descent landing system.

A description of the reusable launch system was outlined in September 2011. SpaceX said it would attempt to develop powered descent and recovery of both Falcon 9 stages—a fully vertical takeoff, vertical landing (VTVL) rocket. The company produced an animated video of the first stage returning tail-first for a powered descent and the second stage with a heat shield, reentering head first before rotating for a powered descent. In September 2012, SpaceX began flight tests on a prototype reusable first stage with the suborbital Grasshopper rocket. Those tests continued into 2014, including testing of a second and larger prototype vehicle, F9R Dev1.

News of the Grasshopper test rocket had become public a few days earlier, when the US Federal Aviation Administration released a draft Environmental Impact Assessment for the SpaceX Test Site in Texas, and the space media had reported it. In May 2012, SpaceX obtained a set of atmospheric test data for the recovery of the Falcon 9 first stage based on 176 test runs in the NASA Marshall Space Flight Center wind tunnel test facility. The work was contracted out by SpaceX under a reimbursable Space Act Agreement with NASA.

In 2012, it was projected that the first-stage separation of a reusable Falcon 9 rocket would occur at a velocity of approximately Mach 6 (4,600 mph; 2.0 km/s) rather than Mach 10 (7,600 mph; 3.4 km/s) for an expendable Falcon 9, to provide the residual fuel necessary for the deceleration and turnaround maneuver and the controlled descent and landing.

In November 2012, CEO Elon Musk announced plans to build a second, much larger, reusable rocket system powered by LOX/methane rather than LOX/RP-1 used on Falcon 9 and Falcon Heavy. The new system was to be "an evolution of SpaceX's Falcon 9 booster", and SpaceX reiterated their commitment to develop a breakthrough in vertical landing technology. By the end of 2012, the demonstration test vehicle, Grasshopper, had made three VTVL test flights—including a 29-second hover flight to 40 meters (130 ft) on December 17, 2012. In early March 2013, SpaceX successfully tested Grasshopper for a fourth time when it flew to an altitude of over 80 meters (260 ft).

In March 2013, SpaceX announced that it would instrument and equip subsequent Falcon 9 first-stages as controlled descent test vehicles, with plans for over-water propulsively decelerated simulated landings beginning in 2013, with the intent to return the vehicle to the launch site for a powered landing—possibly as early as mid-2014. The April 2013 draft Environmental Impact Statement for the proposed SpaceX South Texas Launch Site includes specific accommodations for return of the Falcon 9 first-stage boosters to the launch site. Elon Musk first publicly referred to the reusable Falcon 9 as the Falcon 9-R in April 2013.

In September 2013, SpaceX successfully relit three engines of a spent booster on an orbital launch, and the booster re-entered the atmosphere at hypersonic speed without burning up. With the data collected from the first flight test of a booster-controlled descent from high altitude, coupled with the technological advancements made on the Grasshopper low-altitude landing demonstrator, SpaceX announced it believed it was ready to test a full land-recovery of a booster stage. Based on the positive results from the first high-altitude flight test, SpaceX advanced the expected date of a test from mid-2014 to early 2015, with the intention of doing so on the next Space Station cargo resupply flight pending regulatory approvals. That flight took place on April 18, 2014.

Musk stated in May 2013 that the goal of the program is to achieve full and rapid reusability of the first stage by 2015, and to develop full launch vehicle reusability following that as "part of a future design architecture". In September 2013, SpaceX said that if all aspects of the test program were successful and if a customer is interested, the first reflight of a Falcon 9 booster stage could happen as early as late 2014.

In February 2014, SpaceX made explicit that the newly defined super-heavy launch vehicle for what was then called Mars Colonial Transporter would also make use of the reusable technology. This was consistent with Musk's strategic statement in 2012 that "The revolutionary breakthrough will come with rockets that are fully and rapidly reusable. We will never conquer Mars unless we do that. It'll be too expensive. The American colonies would never have been pioneered if the ships that crossed the ocean hadn't been reusable."

Also in May 2014, SpaceX announced an extensive test program for a reusable, powered landing space capsule called DragonFly. The tests were to be run in Texas at the McGregor Rocket Test Facility in 2014–2015.

In June 2014, COO Gwynne Shotwell clarified that all funding for development and testing of the reusable launch system technology development program is private funding from SpaceX, with no contribution from the US government. As of 2017, SpaceX had spent over a billion dollars on the development program.

For the first time, SpaceX stated in July 2014 that they are "highly confident of being able to land successfully on a floating launch pad or back at the launch site and refly the rocket with no required refurbishment."

By late 2014, SpaceX suspended or abandoned the plan to recover and reuse the Falcon 9 second stage; the additional mass of the required heat shield, landing gear, and low-powered landing engines would incur too great a performance penalty. While the idea was mentioned again later, it was ultimately abandoned as Starship development made progress.

In December 2015, following the recovery of the first stage from December 22 launch, SpaceX projected that the first reflight of a recovered booster would likely occur in 2016, but not using the December 22 recovered stage.

In September 2016, SpaceX announced that development was underway to extend the reusable flight hardware to second stages, a more challenging engineering problem because the vehicle is travelling at orbital velocity. The reusable technology was to have been extended to the 2016 designs of both the tanker and crewed spaceship upper stage variants as well as the first stage of the Interplanetary Transport System, and is considered paramount to the plans Elon Musk is championing to enable the settlement of Mars. In 2016, initial test flights of an Interplanetary Transport System vehicle were expected no earlier than 2020.

In 2017, SpaceX was making test flight progress in incrementally and iteratively developing a fairing recovery system. In July 2017, Musk said "we are quite close to being able to recover the fairing. ... We've got a decent shot of recovering a fairing by the end of the year, and reflight by late this year or early next." The cost savings to SpaceX of recovering the fairing is expected to be on the order of US$5 million. Together, the booster stage and the fairing make up approximately 80 percent of the cost of a launch. The fairings are equipped with a steerable parachute and fall towards a ship equipped with a big net. Intact fairings could be recovered from the ocean starting in 2017, with landings in the net from 2019 on.

== Technologies ==
Several new technologies needed to be developed and tested to facilitate successful launch and recovery of the first stages of Falcon 9 and Falcon Heavy, and both stages of Starship. Since 2017, recovery and reuse of Falcon rocket boosters has become routine.

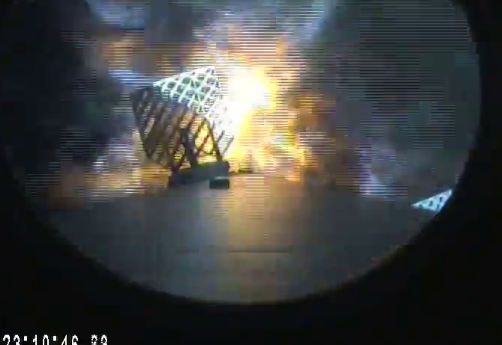
Falcon 9 booster stage re-entry with grid fins, February 2015 following the launch of the DSCOVR mission

The technologies that were developed for Falcon 9, some of which are still being refined, include:

- Restartable ignition system for the first-stage booster. Restarts are required at both supersonic velocities in the upper atmosphere—in order to reverse the high velocity away from the launch pad and put the booster on a descent trajectory back toward the launch pad—and at high transonic velocities in the lower atmosphere—in order to slow the terminal descent and to perform a soft landing. If the booster returns to a landing site on land another burn is needed shortly after stage separation to reverse the flight direction of the booster, for a total of four burns for the center engine.
- New attitude control technology for the booster to bring the descending rocket body through the atmosphere in a manner conducive both to non-destructive return and sufficient aerodynamic control such that the terminal phase of the landing is possible. This includes sufficient roll control authority to keep the rocket from spinning excessively as occurred on the first high-altitude flight test in September 2013, where the roll rate exceeded the capabilities of the booster attitude control system (ACS) and the fuel in the tanks "centrifuged" to the side of the tank shutting down the single engine involved in the low-altitude deceleration maneuver. The technology needs to handle the transition from the vacuum of space at hypersonic conditions, decelerating to supersonic velocities and passing through transonic buffet, before relighting one of the main-stage engines at terminal velocity.
- Hypersonic grid fins were added to the booster test vehicle design beginning on the fifth ocean controlled-descent test flight in 2014 in order to enable precision landing. Arranged in an "X" configuration, the grid fins control the descending rocket's lift vector once the vehicle has returned to the atmosphere to enable a much more precise landing location. Iteration on the design continued into 2017. Larger and more robust grid fins, made from forged titanium and left unpainted, were first tested in June 2017, and have been used on all reusable Block 5 Falcon 9 first stages since May 2018.

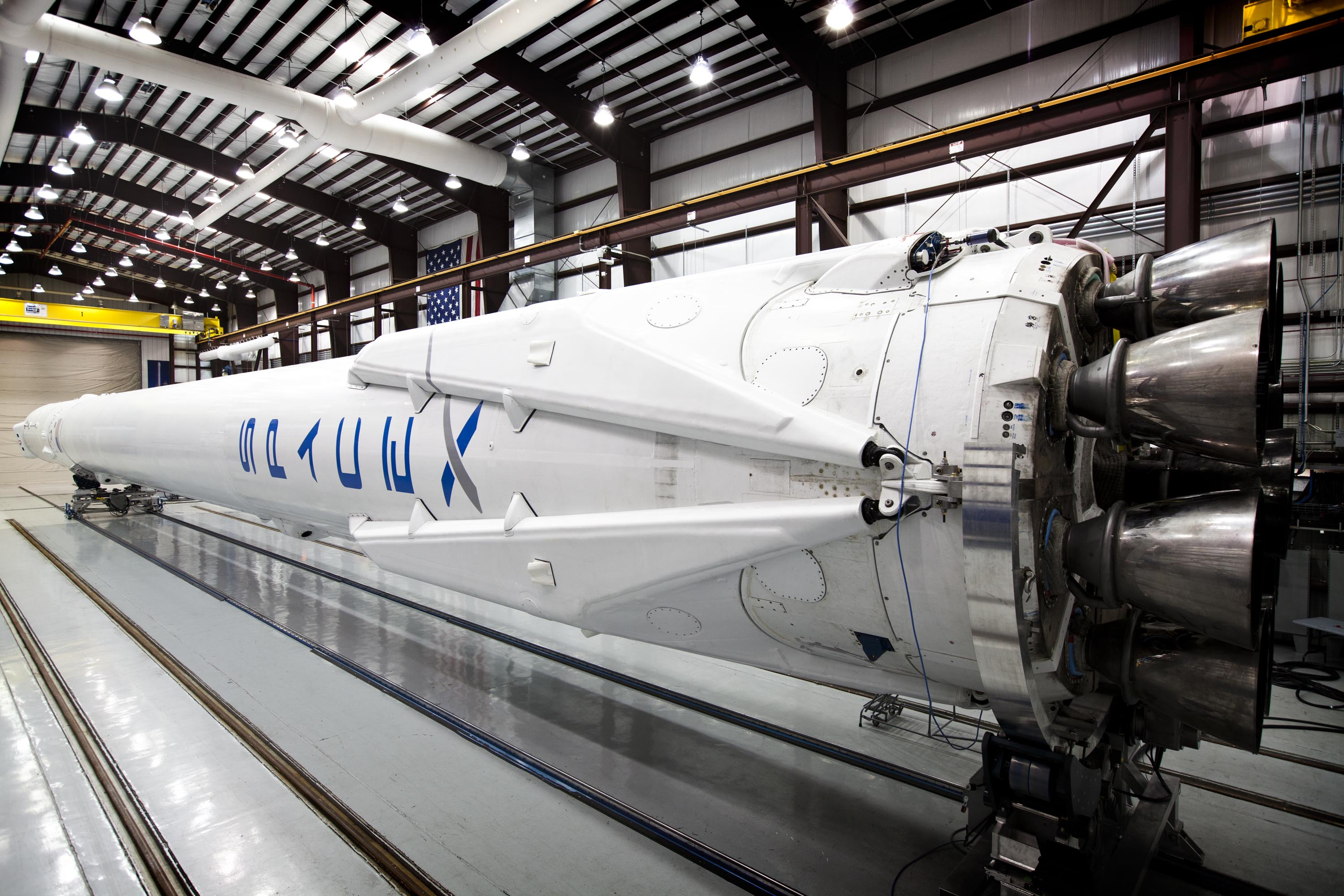
Falcon 9 v1.1 with landing legs attached, in stowed position as the rocket is prepared for launch in its hangar

- The rocket engine needs to be throttleable to achieve zero velocity at the same time the rocket reaches the ground. Even the lowest possible thrust of a single Merlin 1D engine exceeds the weight of the nearly empty Falcon 9 booster core, therefore the rocket cannot hover.
- Terminal guidance and landing capability, including a vehicle control system and a control system software algorithm to be able to land a rocket with the thrust-to-weight ratio of the vehicle greater than one, with closed-loop thrust vector and throttle control
- Navigation sensor suite for precision landing

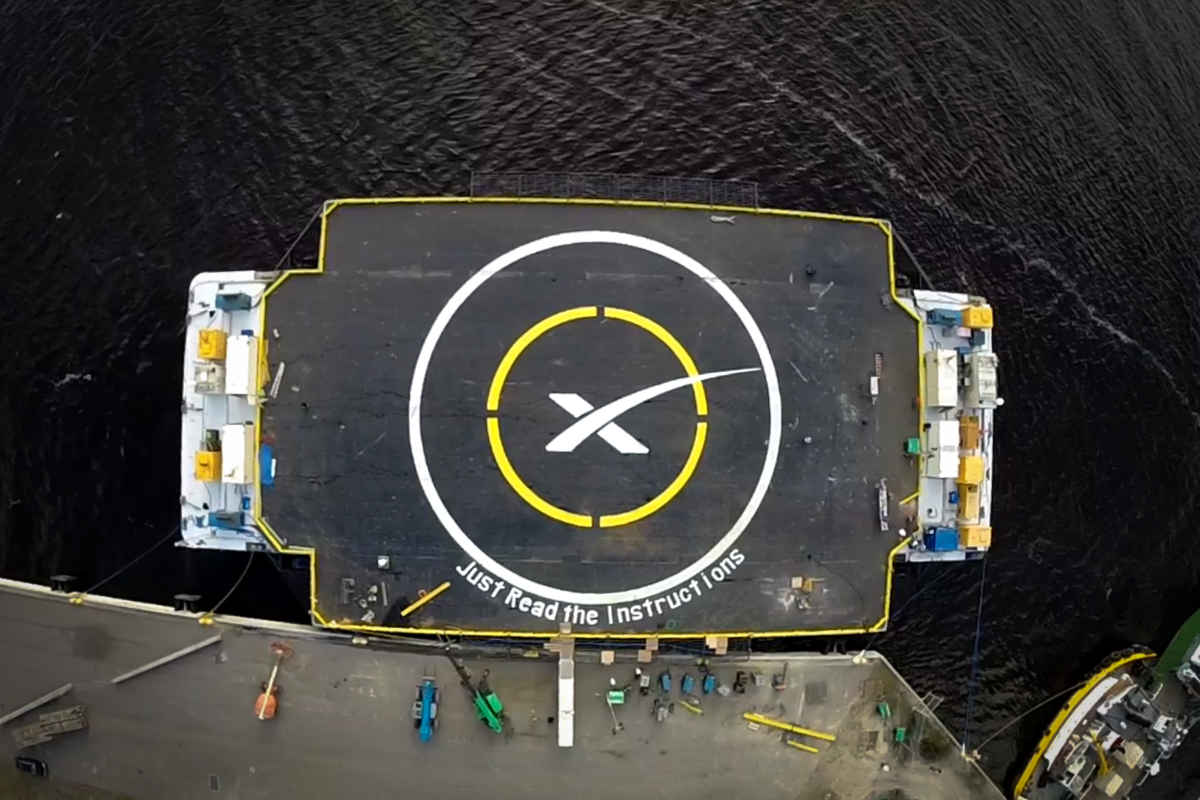
Autonomous Spaceport Drone Ship, in port in January 2015.

- A large floating landing platform for launches where the first stage does not have sufficient fuel to return to the launch site. As of 2022, SpaceX built three autonomous spaceport drone ships, one operating the West coast and two on the East coast of the United States.
- A thermal protection system to avoid damage to the first stage when re-entering the atmosphere.
- Lightweight, deployable landing gear for the booster stage. In May 2013, the design was shown to be a nested, telescoping piston on an A-frame. The total span of the four carbon fiber/aluminum extensible landing legs is approximately 18 meters (60 ft), and weigh less than 2,100 kilograms (4,600 lb). Deployment system uses high-pressure Helium as the working fluid. With Flight 25 it was announced that each landing leg contained a "crush core", to absorb the impact of landing for particularly hard landings.

== Economics of rocket reuse ==
In order to make the Falcon 9 reusable and return to the launch site, extra propellant and landing gear must be carried on the first stage, requiring around a 30 percent reduction of the maximum payload to orbit in comparison with the expendable Falcon 9. Reflight of a previously used stage on a subsequent flight is dependent on the condition of the landed stage, and is a technique that has seen little use outside of the Space Shuttle's reusable solid rocket boosters.

Musk projected in 2015 that the reflight step of the program would be "straightforward," because of the multiple full duration firings of the engines that had been done on the ground, and the multiple engine restarts that had been demonstrated by that time, with no significant degradation seen. In 2015, industry analysts continued to forecast problems that could prevent economic reuse because costs to refurbish and relaunch the stage were not yet demonstrated, and the economic case for reuse would necessarily be highly dependent on launching frequently.

SpaceX is expected to significantly reduce the cost of access to space, and change the increasingly competitive market in space launch services. Michael Belfiore wrote in Foreign Policy in 2013 that, at a published cost of US$56.5 million per launch to low Earth orbit, "Falcon 9 rockets are already the cheapest in the industry. Reusable Falcon 9s could drop the price by an order of magnitude, sparking more space-based enterprise, which in turn would drop the cost of access to space still further through economies of scale." Even for military launches, which have a number of contractual requirements for additional launch services to be provided, SpaceX's price is under US$100 million.

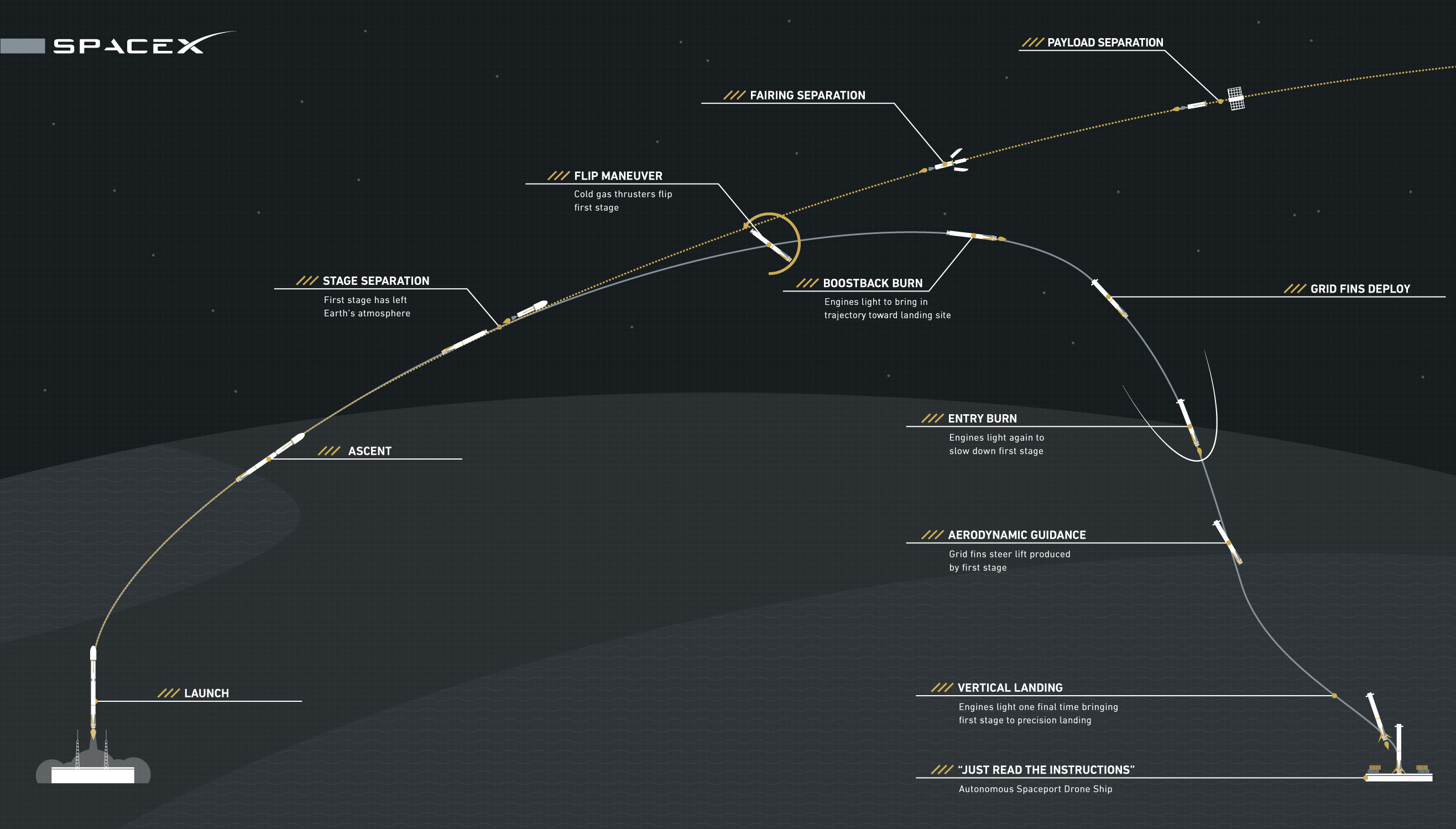
Depiction of Falcon 9 landing trajectory for some of the floating-platform recovery tests

Space industry analyst Ajay Kothari has noted that SpaceX reusable technology could do for space transport "what jet engines did for air transportation sixty years ago when people never imagined that more than 500 million passengers would travel by airplanes every year and that the cost could be reduced to the level it is—all because of passenger volume and reliable reusability." SpaceX said in January 2014 that if they are successful in developing the reusable technology, launch prices of around US$5 to 7 million for a reusable Falcon 9 were possible, and following the successful first stage recovery in December 2015, Musk said that "the potential cost reduction over the long term is probably in excess of a factor of 100."

As of March 2014, launch service providers who compete with SpaceX were not planning to develop similar technology or offer competing reusable launcher options. Neither ILS, which markets launches of the Russian Proton rocket; Arianespace; nor SeaLaunch were planning on developing and marketing reusable launch vehicle services. SpaceX was the only competitor that projected a sufficiently elastic market on the demand side to justify the costly development of reusable rocket technology and the expenditure of private capital to develop options for that theoretical market opportunity.

In 2014, the Falcon 9 v1.1 rocket was designed with about 30 percent more capacity than its official payload specifications; the additional performance was reserved for SpaceX to perform first-stage re-entry and landing tests towards reusability while still achieving the specified orbital payload delivery for customers.

In order to achieve the full economic benefit of the reusable technology, it is necessary that the reuse be both rapid and complete—without the long and costly refurbishment period or partially reusable design that plagued earlier attempts at reusable launch vehicles. SpaceX has been explicit that the "huge potential to open up space flight" is dependent on achieving both complete and rapid reusability. CEO Musk stated in 2014 that success with the technology development effort could reduce "the cost of spaceflight by a factor of 100" because the cost of the propellant/oxidizer on the Falcon 9 is only 0.3 percent of the total cost of the vehicle.

Separate from the market competition brought about by SpaceX lower launch prices and the potential future of even more radically lower launch prices if the technology can be completed successfully, Aviation Week said in 2014 that "SpaceX reusable launch work is an R&D model"—"The audacity of the concept and speed of the program’s progress make it an exemplar. ... [the] breakneck pace of development has been almost Apollo-like in its execution... [even while] success is far from guaranteed."

On March 9, 2016, SpaceX President Gwynne Shotwell gave a more realistic appraisal of the potential savings of a reused launch now that attempts to reuse the second stage (of Falcon 9) had been abandoned due to cost and weight issues. She said at US$1 million cost of refueling and US$3 million cost of refurbishing a used first stage could potentially allow a launch to be priced as low as US$40 million, a 30% saving. SpaceX's biggest customer, SES, said it wants to be the first to ride a reused vehicle, though it wants a launch price of US$30 million or a 50% saving to offset the risk of pioneering the process.

According to Elon Musk, almost every piece of the Falcon should be reused over 100 times. Heat shields and a few other items should be reused over 10 times before replacement. In March 2017, SpaceX announced progress in their experiments to recover, and eventually reuse, the 6-million dollar payload fairing. On the SES-10 mission, one of the fairing halves performed a controlled atmospheric reentry and splashdown using thrusters and a steerable parachute; fairings are eventually slated to land on a floating "bouncy castle" structure.

SpaceX began re-flight of previously launched booster stages in 2017. The first re-flight was accomplished in March 2017, nearly a year after the booster's maiden flight; the second was in June 2017, only five months after its maiden flight. Both were successful, and both insurers and launch service customers are supporting the market in launch services provided by multiple-use boosters.

In August 2020, Musk tweeted that refurbishment and reuse of a booster is done for less than 10% the price of a new booster while the payload reduction is below 40%. According to his tweet, SpaceX breaks even with a second flight per booster and saves money from the third flight on. At that time, Falcon 9 Block 5 had made 35 flights with 11 boosters.

== Technical feasibility ==
Prior to the reusability program's success in December 2015, the return of an orbital launch system booster rocket had never been accomplished, and many questioned both technical and economic feasibility. And even after this success, the rapid reuse of a rocket has not been attempted. Developing a reusable rocket is extremely challenging due to the small percentage of a rocket's mass that can make it to orbit. Typically, a rocket's payload is only about 3% of the mass of the rocket which is also roughly the amount of mass in fuel that is required for the vehicle's re-entry.

Elon Musk said at the beginning of the program that he believed the return, vertical landing and recovery was possible because the SpaceX manufacturing methodologies result in a rocket efficiency exceeding the typical 3% margin. A SpaceX rocket operating in the reusable configuration has approximately 30% less payload lift capacity than the same rocket in an expendable configuration.

Although the reusable launch system technology was developed and initially used for the first stages of the Falcon family of rockets, it is particularly well suited to the Falcon Heavy where the two outer cores separate from the rocket earlier in the flight, and are therefore moving more slowly at stage separation. For example, on Falcon 9 flight 20, the speed at separation was close to 6000 km/h and this allowed a return to near the launch site. On flight 22, going to a more-energetic GTO orbit, the higher velocity at separation was between 8000 and 9000 km/h. At these faster speeds it is not possible to return the booster to near the launch site for a landing; if a landing is attempted it needs to be hundreds of kilometers downrange on an autonomous droneship.

Reuse also has an impact on risk estimates. While early customers of reused rockets asked for a lower price, a booster that has flown already has been demonstrated to work under realistic flight conditions. Some customers now prefer reused boosters over new boosters.

== Falcon 9 reusability development ==
In 2013, SpaceX was testing reusable technologies both for its first-stage booster launch vehicle designs (with three test vehicles: Grasshopper, F9R Dev1, and F9R Dev2) – and for its new reusable SpaceX Dragon 2 space capsule (with a low-altitude test vehicle called DragonFly).

SpaceX has publicly disclosed a multi-element, incremental test program for booster stages that includes four aspects:

- low-altitude (less than 760 m/2,500 ft), low-velocity testing of its single-engine Grasshopper technology-demonstrator at its Texas test site
- low-altitude (less than 3,000 m/9,800 ft), low-velocity testing of a much larger, second-generation, three-engine test vehicle called F9R Dev1. The second generation vehicle includes extensible landing legs and will be tested at the Texas test site
- high-altitude, mid-velocity testing was planned but cancelled in favor of post-mission re-entry tests of first-stage boosters. It would have used F9R Dev2 at a SpaceX leased facility at Spaceport America in New Mexico.
- high-altitude (91 km/300,000 ft), very-high-velocity (approximately 2.0 km/s; 6,500 km/h; 4,100 mph; Mach 6) ballistic reentry, controlled-deceleration and controlled-descent tests of post-mission (spent) Falcon 9 booster stages following a subset of Falcon 9 launches that began in 2013.

Eight low-altitude booster flight tests were made by Grasshopper in 2012 and 2013. The first booster return controlled-descent test from high-altitude was made in September 2013, with a second test in April, a third test flight in July and a fourth test in September 2014. All four test flights to date were intended to be over-water, simulated landings. Five low-altitude booster flight tests of F9R Dev1 were flown during April–August 2014, before the vehicle self-destructed for safety reasons on the fifth flight.

=== Flight test vehicles ===
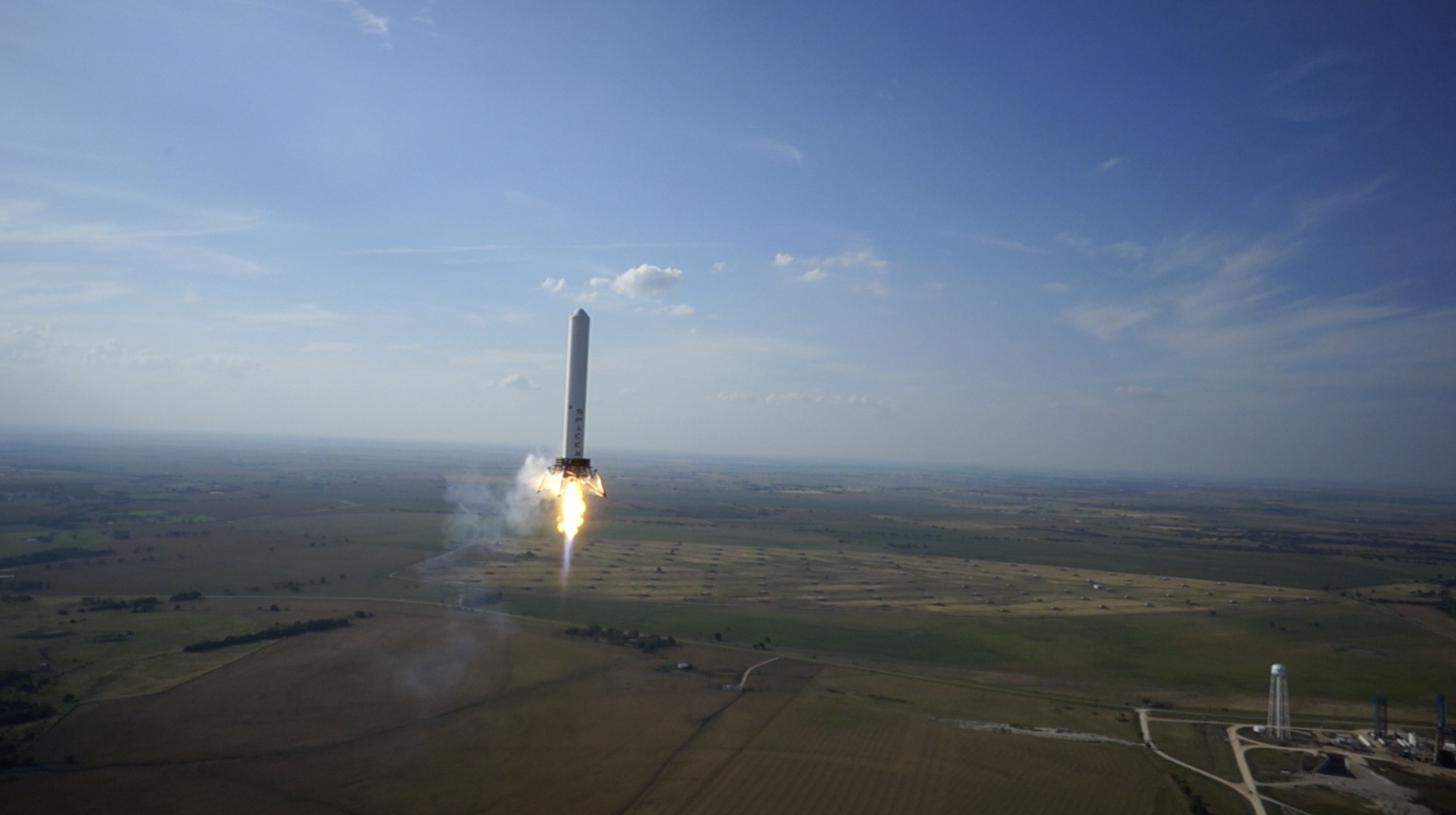
Grasshopper rocket, in 2013, performing a 325 meter flight followed by a soft propulsive landing in an attempt to develop technologies for a reusable launch vehicle

SpaceX used a set of experimental technology-demonstrator, suborbital reusable launch vehicles (RLV) to begin flight testing their reusable booster technologies in 2012. Two versions of the prototype reusable test rockets were built—the 106-foot (32 m) tall Grasshopper (formerly designated as Grasshopper v1.0) and the 160-foot (49 m) tall Falcon 9 Reusable Development Vehicle, or F9R Dev1—formerly known as Grasshopper v1.1—as well as a capsule prototype for testing propulsive landings of the Dragon crew and cargo capsule for the Falcon 9—DragonFly. Grasshopper was built in 2011–2012 for low-altitude, low-velocity hover testing that began in September 2012 and concluded in October 2013 after eight test flights. The second prototype vehicle design, F9R Dev1, was built on the much larger Falcon 9 v1.1 booster stage which was used to further extend the low-altitude flight testing envelope on a vehicle that better matched the actual flight hardware. It made five test flights in 2014. The low-altitude, low-speed flights of the test vehicle rockets and capsule were conducted at the SpaceX Rocket Test Facility in McGregor, Texas

SpaceX indicated in November 2018 that they considered testing a heavily modified Falcon 9 second stage that would look like a "mini-BFR Ship" and be used for atmospheric reentry testing of a number of technologies needed for the full-scale spaceship, including an ultra-light heat shield and high-Mach control surfaces, but two weeks later, Musk dismissed the approach in favor of using a full-diameter BFR instead.

==== Grasshopper ====
Grasshopper, the company's first VTVL test vehicle, consisted of a Falcon 9 v1.0 first-stage tank, a single Merlin-1D engine, and four permanently attached steel landing legs. It stood 106 feet (32 m) tall. SpaceX built a 0.5-acre (0.20 ha) concrete launch facility at its Rocket Development and Test Facility in McGregor, Texas to support the Grasshopper flight test program. Grasshopper was also known as Grasshopper version 1.0, or Grasshopper v1.0, prior to 2014 during the time the followon Grasshopper-class test vehicles were being built.

In addition to three test flights in 2012, five additional tests were successfully flown by the end of October 2013—including the fourth test overall in March 2013—in which Grasshopper doubled its highest leap to rise to 80.1 meters (263 ft) with a 34-second flight. In the seventh test, in August 2013, the vehicle flew to 250 meters (820 ft) during a 60-second flight and executed a 100-meter (330 ft) lateral maneuver before returning to the pad. Grasshopper made its eighth and final test flight on October 7, 2013, flying to 744 meters (2,441 ft) before making its eighth successful landing. The Grasshopper test vehicle is now retired.

==== Falcon 9 Reusable Development Vehicle ====
As early as October 2012, SpaceX discussed development of a second-generation Grasshopper test vehicle, which was to have lighter landing legs that fold up on the side of the rocket, a different engine bay, and would be nearly 50% longer than the first Grasshopper vehicle. In March 2013, SpaceX announced that the larger Grasshopper-class suborbital flight vehicle would be constructed out of the Falcon 9 v1.1 first-stage tank that was used for qualification testing at the SpaceX Rocket Development and Test Facility in early 2013. It was rebuilt as the F9R Dev1 with extensible landing legs. Five test flights occurred in 2014.

The second VTVL flight test vehicle—F9R Dev1, built on the much longer Falcon 9 v1.1 first-stage tank, with retractable landing legs—made its first test flight on April 17, 2014. F9R Dev1 was used for low-altitude test flights in the McGregor, Texas area—projected maximum altitude below 3,000 meters (10,000 ft)—with a total of five test flights, all made during 2014. This vehicle self-destructed as a safety measure during its fifth test flight on August 22, 2014.

By April 2014, a third flight test vehicle—F9R Dev2—was being built and was planned to be flown at the high-altitude test range available at Spaceport America in New Mexico where it was expected to be flown at altitudes up to 91,000 meters (300,000 ft)-plus. It was never flown as SpaceX moved the high-altitude testing program to its controlled-descent testing of used boosters following their use on a paid orbital launch and ascent.

==== DragonFly ====
DragonFly was a prototype test article for a propulsively landed version of the SpaceX Dragon capsule, a suborbital reusable launch vehicle (RLV), intended for low-altitude flight testing. As of May 2014 it was planned to undergo a test program in Texas at the McGregor Rocket Test Facility, during 2014–2015.

The DragonFly test vehicle is powered by eight SuperDraco engines, arranged in a redundant pattern to support fault-tolerance in the propulsion system design. SuperDracos use a storable propellant mixture of monomethyl hydrazine (MMH) fuel and nitrogen tetroxide oxidizer (NTO), the same propellants used in the smaller Draco thrusters used for attitude control and maneuvering on the first-generation Dragon spacecraft. While SuperDraco engines are capable of 73,000 newtons (16,400 lbf) of thrust, during use on the DragonFly flight test vehicle, each will be throttled to less than 68,170 newtons (15,325 lbf) to maintain vehicle stability.

A test flight program of thirty flights was proposed in 2013–2014, including two propulsive assist (parachutes plus thrusters) and two propulsive landing (no parachutes) on flights dropped from a helicopter at an altitude of approximately 10,000 feet (3,000 m). The other 26 test flights were projected to take off from a launch pad: eight to be propulsive assist hops (landing with parachutes plus thrusters) and 18 to be full propulsive hops, similar to the Grasshopper and F9R Dev booster stage test flights. As of 2014, the DragonFly test program was not expected to start until after the completion of the F9R Dev1 booster testing at the McGregor facility.

=== Falcon 9 booster post-mission flight tests ===
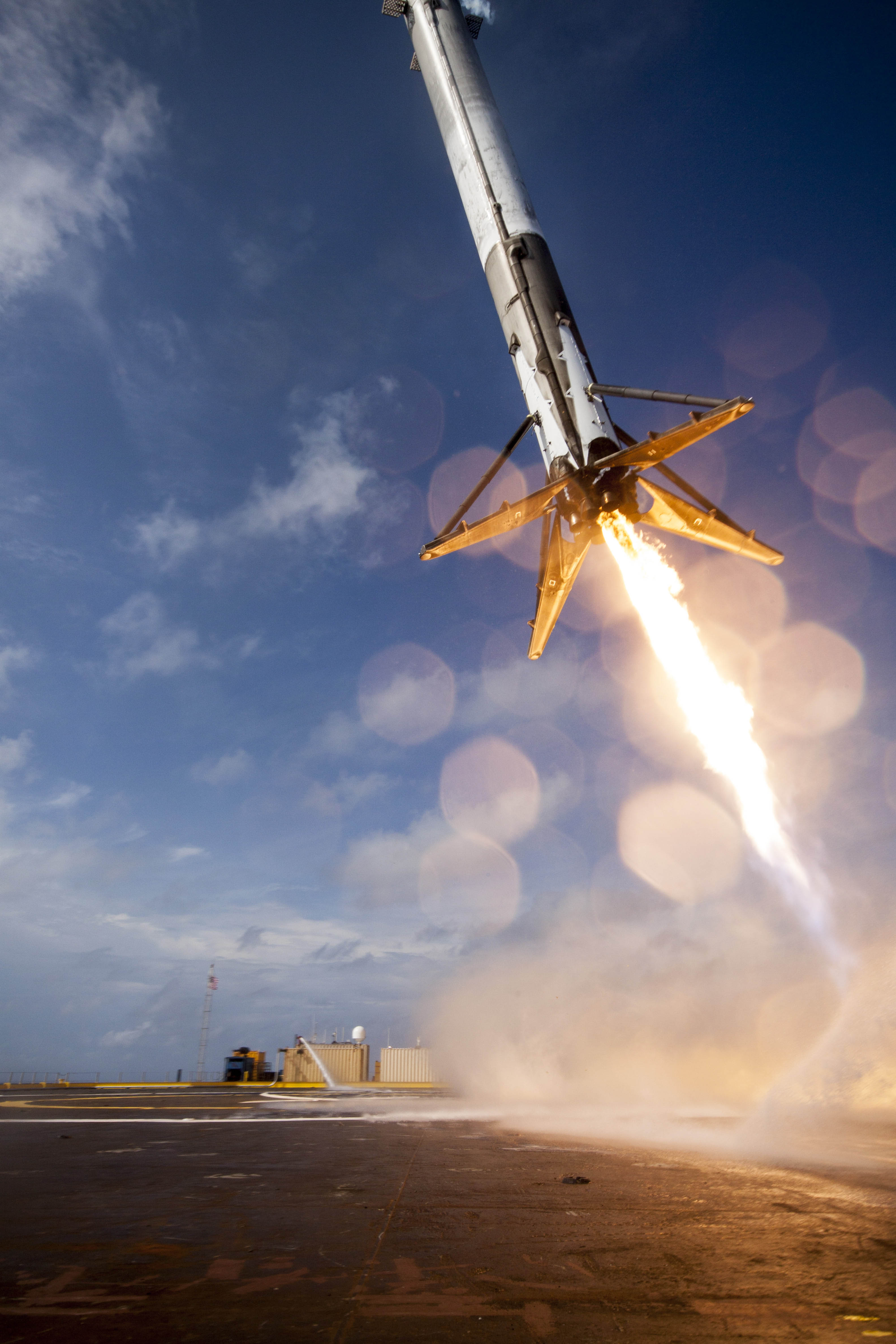
CRS-6 booster landing attempt

In an arrangement highly unusual for launch vehicles, SpaceX began in 2013 using some first stages of the Falcon 9 v1.1 rockets for propulsive-return controlled-descent flight tests after they completed the boost phase of an orbital flight. Since the advent of spaceflight in 1957, launch vehicle boosters would ordinarily just be discarded after setting their payloads on their way. The over-water tests started by SpaceX took place in the Pacific and Atlantic oceans south of Vandenberg Air Force Base (California) and east of Cape Canaveral Air Force Station (Florida). The first flight test occurred on September 29, 2013, after the second stage with the CASSIOPE and nanosat payloads separated from the booster. These descent and simulated landing tests continued over the next two years, with the second flight test taking place on April 18, 2014, two more tests in 2014, and four subsequent tests conducted in 2015. SpaceX continued to make iterative and incremental changes to the booster design, as well as the specific reusable technologies, descent profile and propellant margins, on some 2016–2018 Falcon 9 and Falcon Heavy flights to tweak the design and operational parameters. Many of these descent and landing tests were tested on active orbital spaceflight missions for SpaceX customers as the booster reentered the atmosphere and attempted recoverable landings.

==== Re-entry and controlled descent ====
Following analysis of the flight test data from the first booster-controlled descent in September 2013, SpaceX announced it had successfully tested a large amount of new technology on the flight, and that coupled with the technology advancements made on the Grasshopper low-altitude landing demonstrator, they were ready to test a full recovery of the booster stage. The first flight test was successful; SpaceX said it was "able to successfully transition from vacuum through hypersonic, through supersonic, through transonic speeds, and light the engines all the way and control the stage all the way through [the atmosphere]". Musk said, "the next attempt to recovery [sic] the Falcon 9 first stage will be on the fourth flight of the upgraded rocket. This would be [the] third commercial Dragon cargo flight to ISS. [International Space Station]"

This second flight test took place during the April 2014 Dragon flight to the ISS. SpaceX attached landing legs to the first stage, decelerated it over the ocean and attempted a simulated landing over the water, following the ignition of the second stage on the third cargo resupply mission contracted to NASA. The first stage was successfully slowed enough for a soft landing over the Atlantic Ocean. SpaceX announced in February 2014 the intent to continue the tests to land the first-stage booster in the ocean until precision control from hypersonic through subsonic regimes had been proven. Five additional controlled-descent tests were conducted in the remainder of 2014 through April 2015, including two attempts to land on a floating landing platform—a SpaceX-built Autonomous Spaceport Drone Ship—on the Atlantic Ocean east of the launch site, both of which brought the vehicle to the landing platform, but neither of which resulted in a successful landing.

==== First landing on ground pad ====
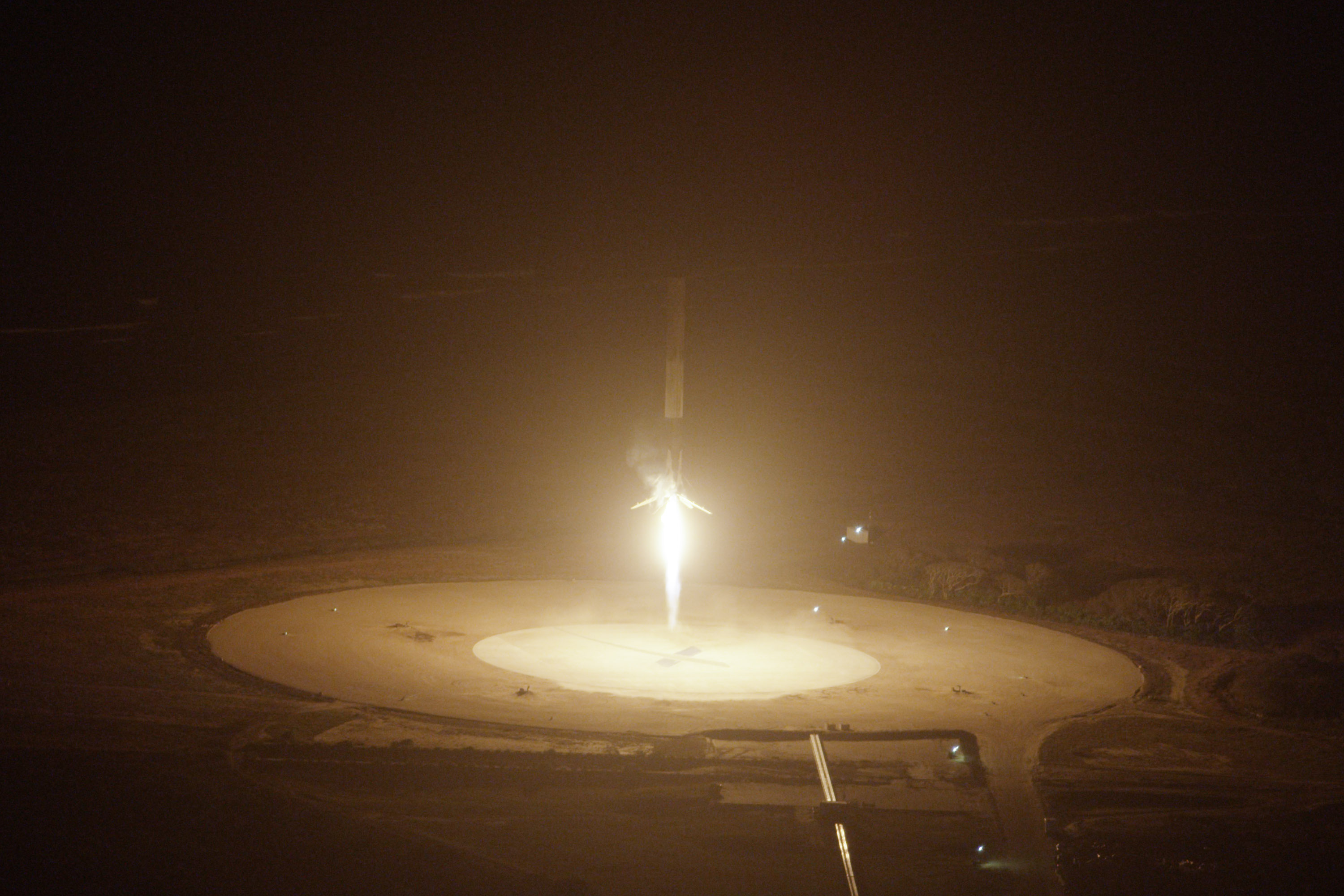
Falcon 9 Flight 20's first stage landing viewed from a helicopter, December 22, 2015

During the 2015 launch hiatus, SpaceX requested regulatory approval from the FAA to attempt returning their next flight to Cape Canaveral instead of targeting a floating platform in the ocean. The goal was to land the booster vertically at the leased Landing Zone 1 facility—the former Launch Complex 13 where SpaceX had recently built a large rocket landing pad. The FAA approved the safety plan for the ground landing on December 18, 2015. The first stage landed successfully on target at 20:38 local time on December 21 (01:38 UTC on December 22).

First stage booster B1019 never flew again after the flight. Rather, the rocket was moved a few miles north to the SpaceX hangar facilities at Launch pad 39A, was refurbished by SpaceX at the adjacent Kennedy Space Center, where it was inspected before being used on January 15, 2016, to conduct a static fire test on its original launchpad, Launch Complex 40. This test aimed to assess the health of the recovered booster and the capability of this rocket design to fly repeatedly in the future. The tests delivered good overall results except for one of the outer engines experiencing thrust fluctuations. Elon Musk reported that this may have been due to debris ingestion. The booster was then retired to the SpaceX facility in Hawthorne, California.

==== Landing attempts on drone ships ====
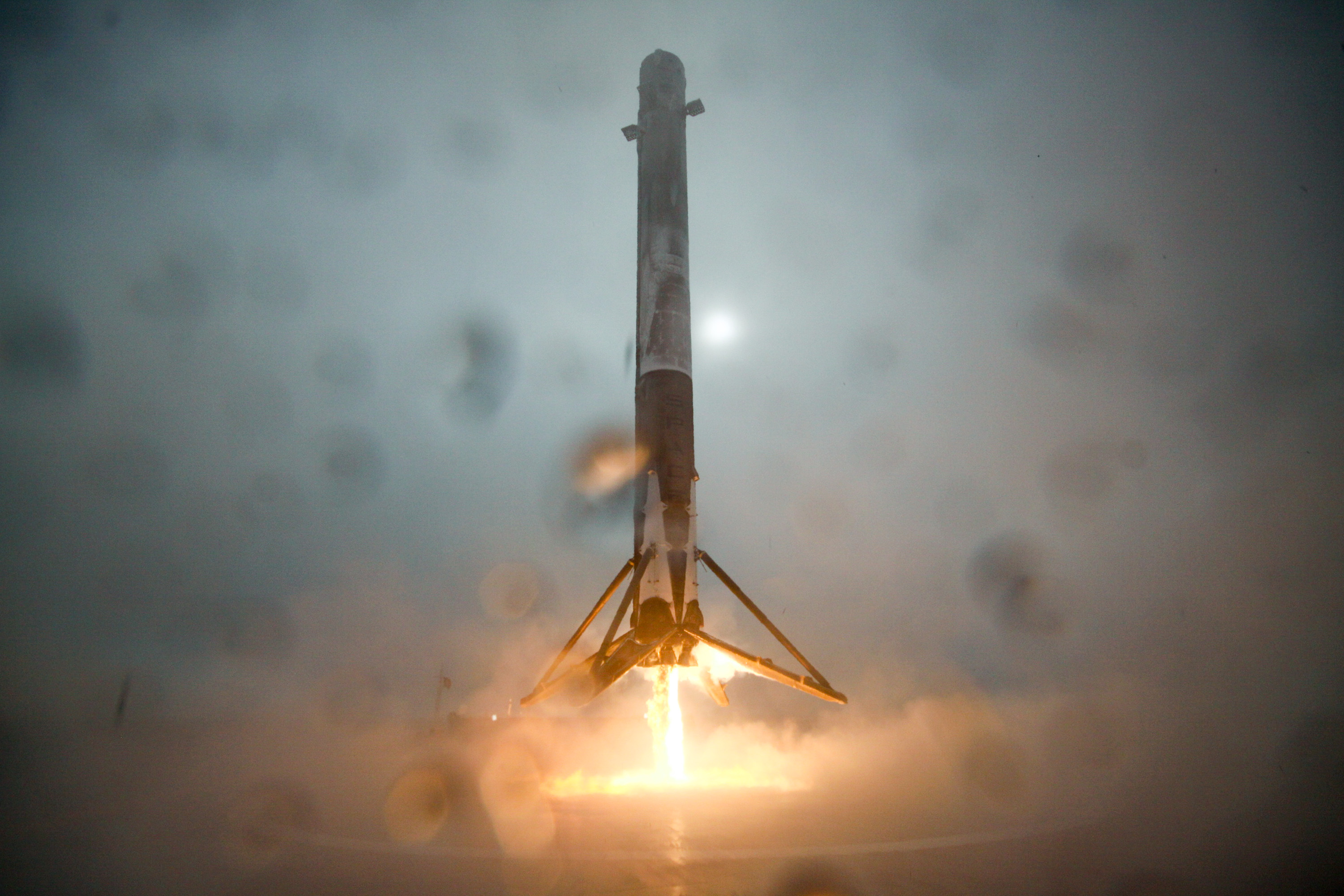
First stage of Falcon 9 Flight 21 descending over the floating landing platform, January 17, 2016, immediately prior to a soft touchdown followed by deflagration of the rocket after a landing leg failed to latch, causing the rocket to tip over.

Falcon 9 Flight 21 launched the Jason-3 satellite on January 17, 2016, and attempted to land on the floating platform Just Read the Instructions, located for the first time about 200 miles (320 km) out in the Pacific Ocean. Approximately 9 minutes into the flight, the live video feed from the drone ship went down due to the loss of its lock on the uplink satellite. The vehicle landed smoothly onto the vessel but one of the four landing legs failed to lock properly, reportedly due to ice from the heavy pre-launch fog preventing a lockout collet from latching. Consequently the booster fell over shortly after touchdown and was destroyed in a deflagration upon impact with the pad.

Flight 22 was carrying a heavy payload of 5,271 kilograms (12,000 lb) to geostationary transfer orbit (GTO). This was heavier than the previously advertised maximum lift capacity to GTO being made possible by going slightly subsynchronous. Following delays caused by failure of Flight 19, SpaceX agreed to provide extra thrust to the SES-9 satellite to take it supersynchronous. As a result of these factors, there was little propellant left to execute a full reentry and landing test with normal margins. Consequently the Falcon 9 first stage followed a ballistic trajectory after separation and re-entered the atmosphere at high velocity, making it less likely to land successfully. The atmospheric re-entry and controlled descent were successful despite the higher aerodynamical constraints on the first stage due to extra speed. However the rocket was moving too fast and was destroyed when it collided with the drone ship. SpaceX collected valuable data on the extended flight envelope required to recover boosters from GTO missions.

==== First landings at sea ====
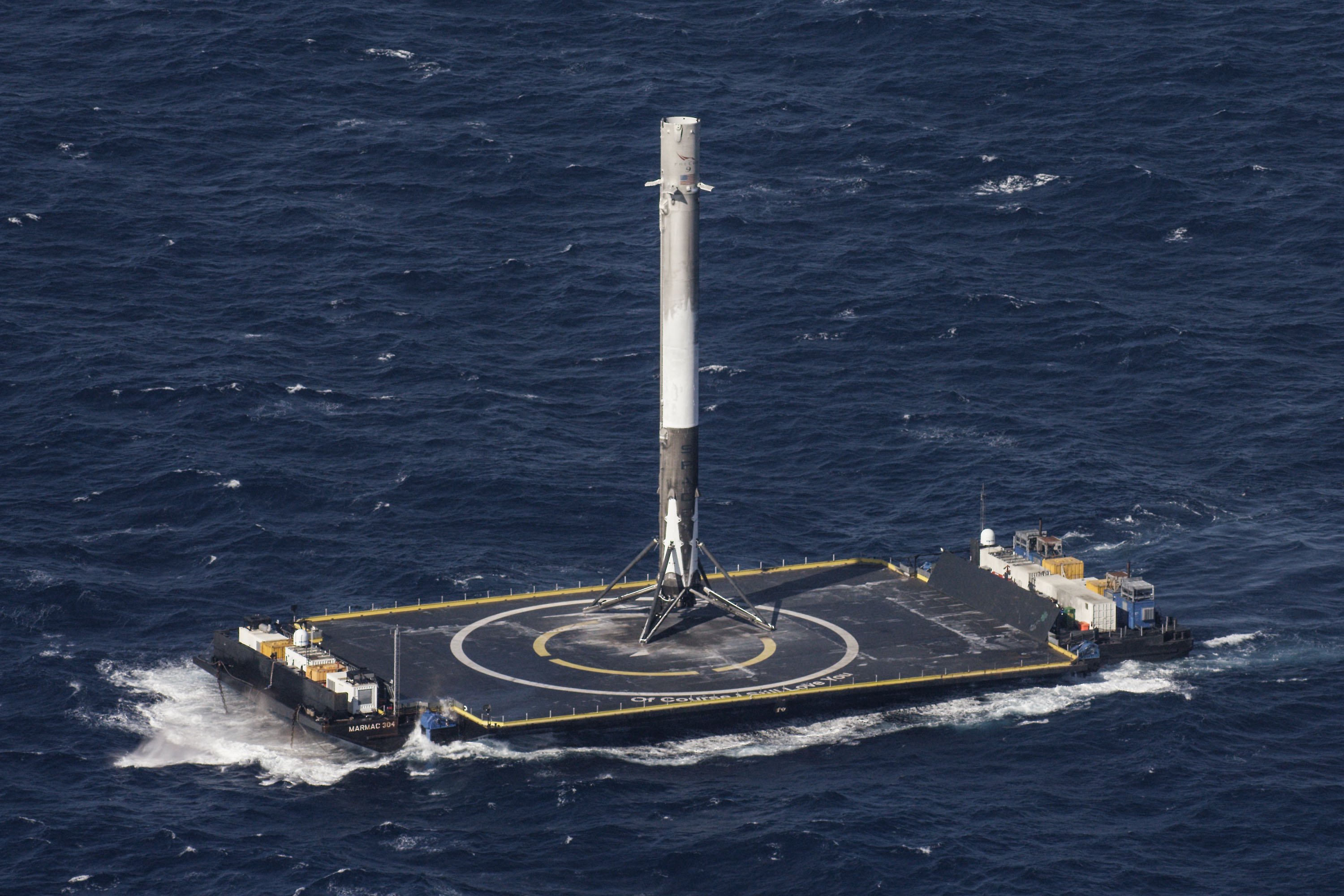
First stage of Falcon 9 Flight 23 landed on autonomous droneship

Starting in January 2015, SpaceX positioned stable floating platforms a few hundred miles off the coast along the rocket trajectory; those transformed barges were called autonomous spaceport drone ships. On April 8, 2016, Falcon 9 Flight 23, the third flight of the full-thrust version, delivered the SpaceX CRS-8 cargo on its way to the International Space Station while the first stage conducted a boostback and re-entry maneuver over the Atlantic ocean. Nine minutes after liftoff, the booster landed vertically on the drone ship Of Course I Still Love You, 300 km from the Florida coastline, achieving a long-sought-after milestone for the SpaceX reusability development program.

A second successful drone ship landing occurred on May 6, 2016, with the next flight which launched JCSAT-14 to GTO. This second landing at sea was more difficult than the previous one because the booster at separation was traveling about 8,350 km/h (5,190 mph) compared to 6,650 km/h (4,130 mph) on the CRS-8 launch to low Earth orbit. Pursuing their experiments to test the limits of the flight envelope, SpaceX opted for a shorter landing burn with three engines instead of the single-engine burns seen in earlier attempts; this approach consumes less fuel by leaving the stage in free fall as long as possible and decelerating more sharply, thereby minimizing the amount of energy expended to counter gravity. Elon Musk indicated this first stage may not be flown again instead being used as a life leader for ground tests to confirm others are good.

A third successful landing followed on 27 May, again following deceleration from the high speed required for a GTO launch. The landing crushed a "crush core" in one leg, leading to a notable tilt to the stage as it stood on the drone ship.

==== Routine procedure ====
Over the subsequent missions, landing of the first stage gradually became a routine procedure, and since January 2017 SpaceX ceased to refer to their landing attempts as "experimental". Low-energy missions to the ISS fly back to the launch site and land at LZ-1, whereas more demanding satellite missions land on drone ships a few hundred miles downrange. Occasional missions with heavy payloads, such as EchoStar 23, do not attempt to land, flying in expendable configuration without fins and legs.

During 2016 and 2017, SpaceX has recovered a number of first stages to both land and drone ships, helping them optimize the procedures needed to re-use the boosters rapidly. In January 2016 Elon Musk estimated the likelihood of success at 70 percent for all landing attempts in 2016, hopefully rising to 90 percent in 2017; he also cautioned that we should expect "a few more RUDs" (Rapid Unscheduled Disassembly, Musk's acronym to denote destruction of the vehicle on impact). Musk's prediction was vindicated, as 5 out of 8 flown boosters (63%) were recovered in 2016, and 14 out of 14 (100%) in 2017. Three GTO missions for heavy payloads (EchoStar 23 in March 2017, Inmarsat-5 F4 in May 2017 and Intelsat 35e in July 2017) were flown in an expendable configuration, not equipped for landing. One booster which could have been recovered was intentionally flown without legs and left to sink after a soft touchdown in the ocean (booster B1036 for the Iridium NEXT 31–40 mission in December 2017).

=== First-stage reuse ===
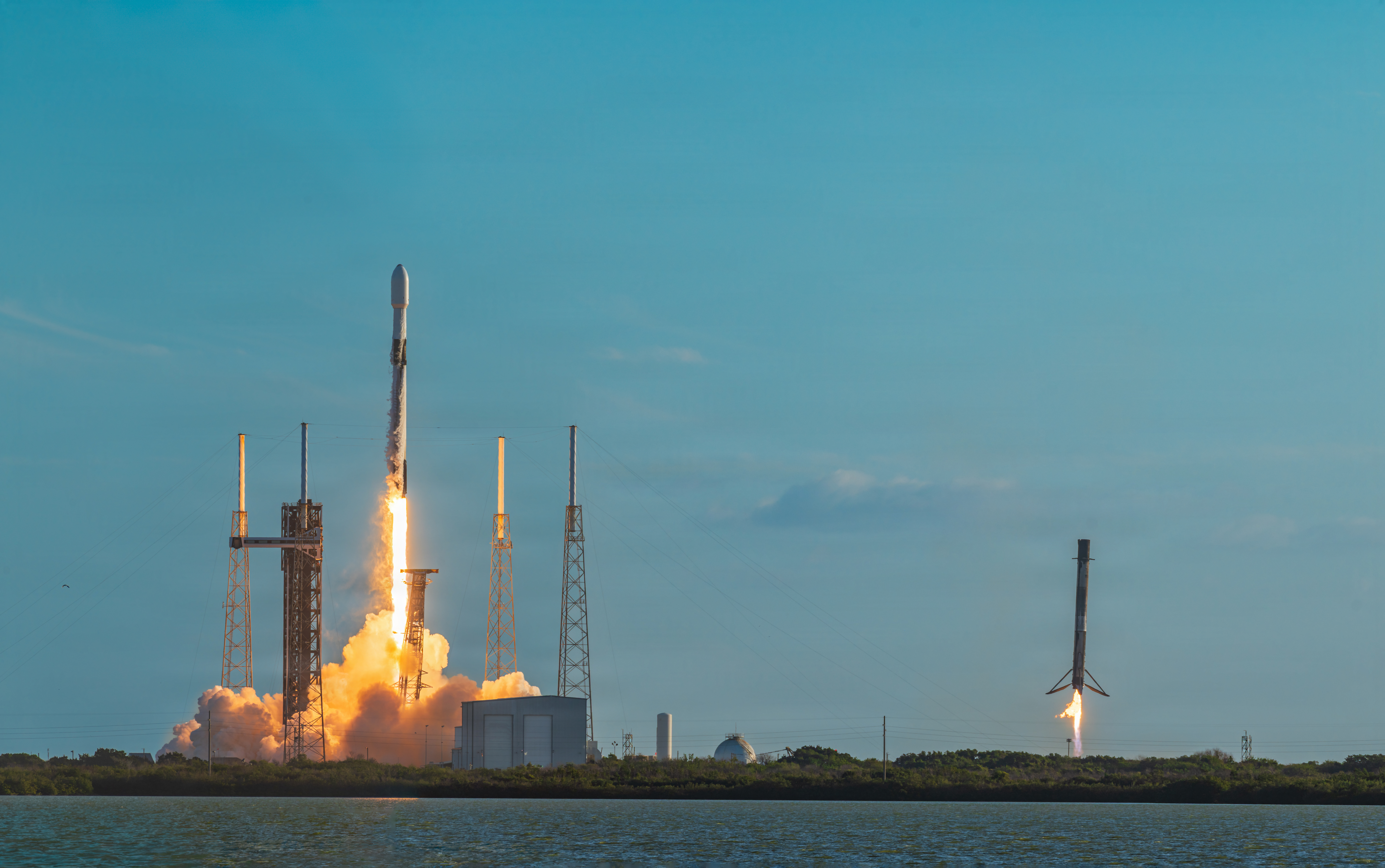
Composite image of NG-24 launch from SLC-40 and subsequent booster landing at LZ-40, capturing both events 8 minutes apart

As of 6 August 2018, SpaceX had recovered 21 first-stage boosters from previous missions, of which six were recovered twice, yielding a total 27 landings. In 2017, SpaceX flew a total of 5 missions out of 20 with re-used boosters (25%). In total, 14 boosters have been re-flown as of August 2018.

On July 28, 2016, the first stage from the JCSAT-2B mission was successfully test-fired for a full duration at the SpaceX McGregor facility. The first reuse attempt occurred on 30 March 2017 with the launch of SES-10, resulting in a successful flight and second landing of the B1021 first stage recovered from the CRS-8 mission of April 2016. Another reflight succeeded in June 2017 with BulgariaSat-1 riding the B1029 booster from the January 2017 Iridium NEXT mission. Booster B1031 flew the CRS-10 mission to the ISS in February 2017 and helped loft communications satellite SES-11 to geostationary orbit in October 2017. Boosters B1035 and B1036 were flown twice each for the same customer, B1035 for NASA missions CRS-11 and CRS-13 in June and December 2017, and B1036 for two batches of 10 Iridium NEXT satellites, also in June and December 2017. B1032 was re-used for GovSat-1 in January 2018 after NROL-76 in May 2017.

SpaceX spent four months refurbishing the first booster to be re-used, B1021, and launched it again after approximately one year. The second booster to be flown again, B1029, was refurbished in "only a couple of months" and re-launched after five months. Elon Musk has stated a goal to turn around a first stage within 24 hours. Musk remains convinced that this long-term goal can be met by SpaceX, but has not stated that the goal would be achieved with the Falcon 9 design.

Boosters B1019 and B1021 were retired and put on display. B1029 was also retired after the BulgariaSat-1 mission. B1023, B1025, B1031 and B1035 were recovered a second time, while B1032 and B1036 were deliberately sunk at sea after a soft ocean touchdown.

By mid-2019, having reflown any single booster only three times to date, SpaceX indicated that they plan to use a single booster at least five times by the end of 2019. No booster achieved this timeline, but B1048 flew four times and two more (B1046 and B1049) made a fourth flight in January 2020. In March 2020, SpaceX first flew a booster (B1048) for the fifth time.

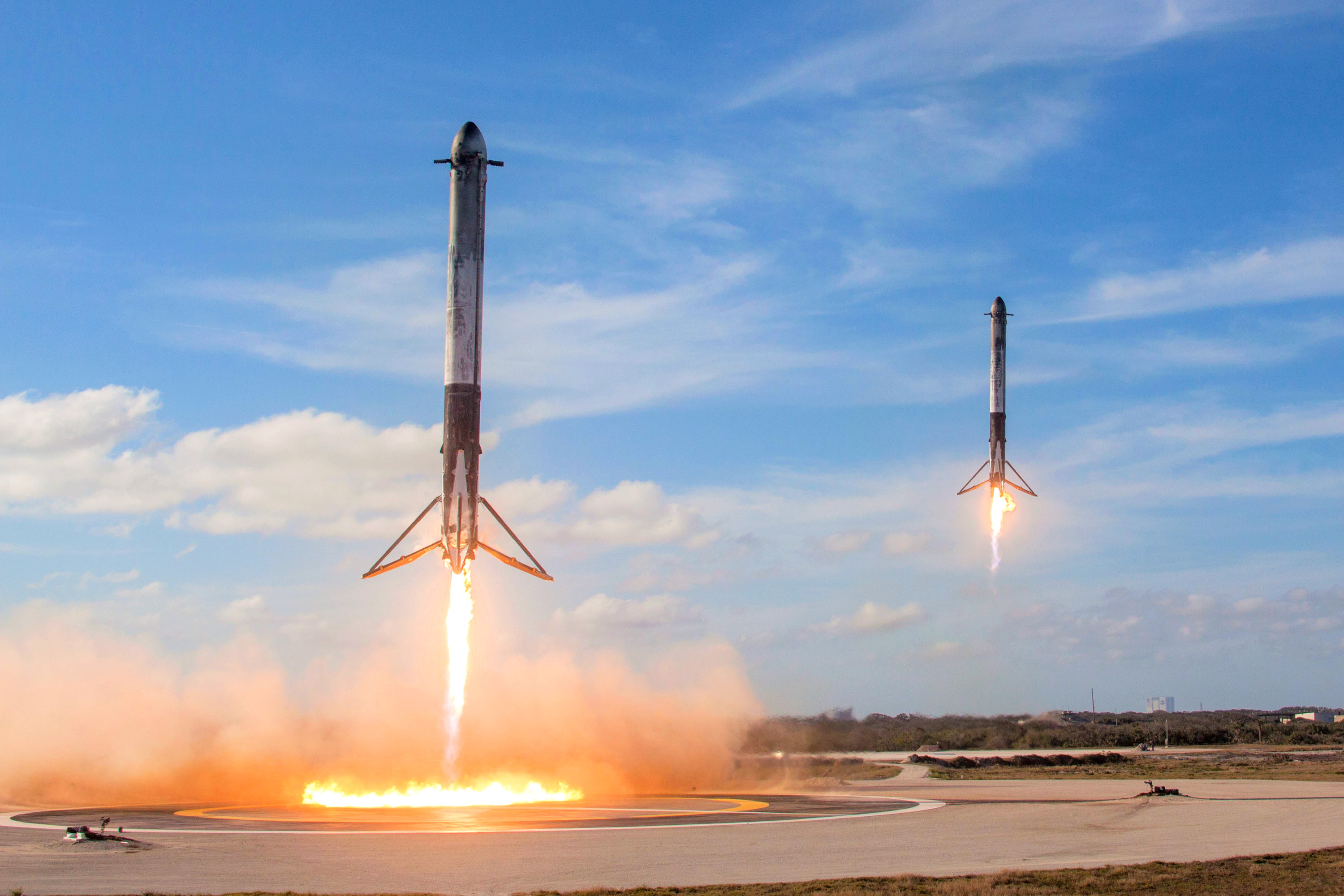
Falcon Heavy Side Boosters landing on LZ1 and LZ2 in 2018

==== Falcon Heavy reusability ====
The Falcon Heavy test flight had no contracted customer, and in order to limit the cost on such a flight, SpaceX targeted to have reused side-boosters. Boosters B1023 and B1025 that had been flown as a Falcon 9 configuration, were reconfigured and used as side boosters on the first flight of Falcon Heavy in February 2018, and then both landed side-by-side at almost the same time on the ground pads. Later Falcon Heavy flights used either new boosters, or side-boosters previously flown on a Falcon Heavy. SpaceX has been unable to recover the central core in any of the first three Falcon Heavy flights, but managed to recover all six side boosters.

==== Block 5 boosters ====
With a streak of 19 successful recovery attempts of the first stage from 2016 through to early 2018, SpaceX has focused on rapid reusability of first stage boosters. Block 3 and Block 4 proved economically feasible to be flown twice, as 11 such boosters have been reflown in 2017 and 2018. Block 5 has been designed with multiple reuses in mind, up to 10 reuses with minimal inspection and up to 100 uses with refurbishment. New aggressive reentry profiles were experimented with expendable Block 3 and Block 4 boosters in early 2018, to test out the limitations on the range of recoverable launch margins that are potential for future Block 5. On 9 May 2021, B1051 became the first booster to be launched and landed for the tenth time, achieving one of SpaceX's milestone goals for reuse. As of March 2026, the reuse record is 37 flights.

=== Fairing reuse ===
Payload fairings have traditionally been expendable, where they have either burned up in the atmosphere or were destroyed upon impacting the ocean. As early as mid-2015, Musk hinted that SpaceX might be working on fairing reusability, following the discovery of wreckage of an unidentified Falcon 9 launch vehicle section off the coast of The Bahamas, and was subsequently confirmed by SpaceX to be a component of a payload fairing that had washed ashore. By April 2016, SpaceX had publicly announced Falcon 9 fairing recovery as an objective. The cost of the fairing is about $6 million per launch, which accounts for approximately ten percent of the overall launch costs. Musk said in 2017: "Imagine if you had $6 million in cash in a pallet flying through the air, and it was going to smash into the ocean. Would you try to recover that? Yes, yes you would."

In March 2017, as part of the SES-10 mission, SpaceX for the first time performed a controlled landing of the payload fairing and successfully recovered a fairing half, aided by attitude-control thrusters and a steerable parachute, helping it glide towards a gentle touchdown on water. The company announced intent to land the fairings eventually on a dry flexible structure, jokingly described by Musk as a "floating bouncy-castle", with the aim of full fairing reuse. With successive tests and refinements on several flights, intact fairing recovery was stated as an objective for 2017, with reflight of a recovered fairing planned in 2018.

The "bouncy castle" meme was in fact a net strung between large arms of a fast platform supply vessel named Mr. Steven (now GO Ms. Tree). The recovery vessel is equipped with dynamic positioning systems, and was tested after the launch of the Paz satellite from Vandenberg Air Force Base in 2017. This mission was also the first to use a version 2 fairing, explicitly designed to "improve survivability for post-launch recovery attempts, and to be reusable on future missions". This recovery attempt was not fully successful; the fairing missed the boat by a few hundred meters but landed intact in the water before being recovered and taken back to port. As of August 2018, all four attempts by SpaceX to land a fairing on a recovery ship had failed, despite fitting Mr. Steven with larger nets before the July 2018 attempt.

In October 2018, at least two fairing recovery tests were performed, involving Mr. Steven and a helicopter, which would drop a fairing half from the height of about 3300 meters. The outcome of the tests was unclear.

In April 2019, during the second Falcon Heavy mission, recovery boat Go Searcher fished the fairing halves out of the sea and it was announced the fairings would be used on a Starlink mission. These fairings were reused in a Starlink mission on 11 November 2019.

In June 2019, following the third Falcon Heavy launch, the first successful fairing catch was made. Images posted to Twitter hours after launch showed one half of the fairing in the net of the recovery vessel GO Ms. Tree.

By late 2020, payload fairings were being regularly recovered by SpaceX, with SpaceX dispatching two custom-modified recovery ships—Ms. Tree and Ms. Chief—to collect the fairings on most launches from their Florida launch site. By this time, SpaceX was also regularly reflying recovered fairings on launches, usually on their own flights where Starlink satellites are the primary or only payload. As of August 2020 however, successful net landings were not yet routine, with less than half of the fairings of the previous three months being caught in the nets, but most still recovered after a soft landing in the ocean.

By April 2021, SpaceX had abandoned the experimental program to attempt recovery of dry payload fairings under parachute descent in a net on a fast ship. SpaceX decided to operationalize "wet recovery" of fairings on future Falcon 9 flights, having found that they can clean, refurbish, and reuse such fairings more economically. SpaceX released Miss Tree and Miss Chief from their contracts and purchased two ships for fairing recovery operations as well as for towing and supporting droneships on the US east coast. These two ships were named in honour of Demo-2 astronauts Doug Hurley and Bob Behnken as Doug and Bob. The earlier names of the ships Bob and Doug were Ella G and Ingrid respectively. Currently, Doug is operating at Port Canaveral while Bob is at Tampa, Florida, undergoing construction.

By 26 May 2021, SpaceX had launched 40 flights that reflew at least one previously-flown fairing half, and one fairing had flown on five different flights, having been recovered and cleaned four previous times. As of September 2026, SN168 is the oldest, most-flown (40 times; the most reflown rocket piece to space) passive fairing half. On the other hand, SN152 is the oldest active fairing half still in use, while SN155 is the most flown (40 flights) active fairing half. Fastest fairing turnaround time record was achieved by active fairing half, SN237, on its 9th flight, launching 9 days, 8 hours, and 21 minutes after the previous mission.

=== Second-stage reuse ===
Despite early public statements that SpaceX would endeavor to make the Falcon 9 second-stage reusable as well, by late 2014, they determined that the mass needed for a re-entry heat shield, landing engines, and other equipment to support recovery of the second stage as well as the diversion of development resources from other company objectives was at that time prohibitive, and indefinitely suspended their second-stage reusability plans for the Falcon rockets. However, in July 2017 they indicated that they might do experimental tests on recovering one or more second-stages in order to learn more about reusability to inform their Starship development process, and in May 2018 provided additional details about how they might carry out some of that testing.

The Starship is planned to replace all existing SpaceX launch and space vehicles after the mid-2020s: Falcon 9, Falcon Heavy and the Dragon spacecraft, aimed initially at the Earth-orbit launch market but with capability to support long-duration spaceflight in the cislunar and Mars mission environments. Both stages will be fully reusable. The integrated second-stage-with-spaceship design has not been used in previous launch vehicles.

=== Reuse of Dragon capsules ===
SpaceX's Dragon capsules have been gradually improved for reuse. Structural elements and internal components are being refurbished between flights, while the heat shield is replaced for each new mission. The last newly built Dragon cargo capsule first flew in July 2017; all subsequent ISS resupply missions were conducted with refurbished capsules, some capsules made a third flight. Dragon's trunk section cannot be reused, as it is designed to burn up in the atmosphere after completing its mission.

The SpaceX Dragon 2 capsule is reused as well. Initially it was planned to use new capsules for all crewed NASA missions but experience with the demonstration missions led to NASA and SpaceX agreeing on reuse starting from Crew-2.

== Operational flow ==
In the first year of successful stage return from the experimental test flights, SpaceX performed ad hoc and flight-specific evaluation and component testing on each successfully landed stage. Stages were processed and initially evaluated in either launch hangars, or for Cape Canaveral landings, in the new hangar SpaceX recently completed at Kennedy Space Center Launch Complex 39. Returned rocket parts have also been transported to SpaceX Hawthorne and SpaceX McGregor for engineering evaluation and testing.

In February 2017, after eight rocket cores had successfully landed—seven of them having launched from Cape Canaveral—SpaceX announced plans to expand their physical facilities to process and refurbish rockets. They will do so in both leased space and in a new building to be built in Port Canaveral, Florida, near the location where the Atlantic Autonomous Spaceport Drone Ship is berthed, and where stages that land on the east-coast droneship are now removed from the ship.

== Starship reusability development ==
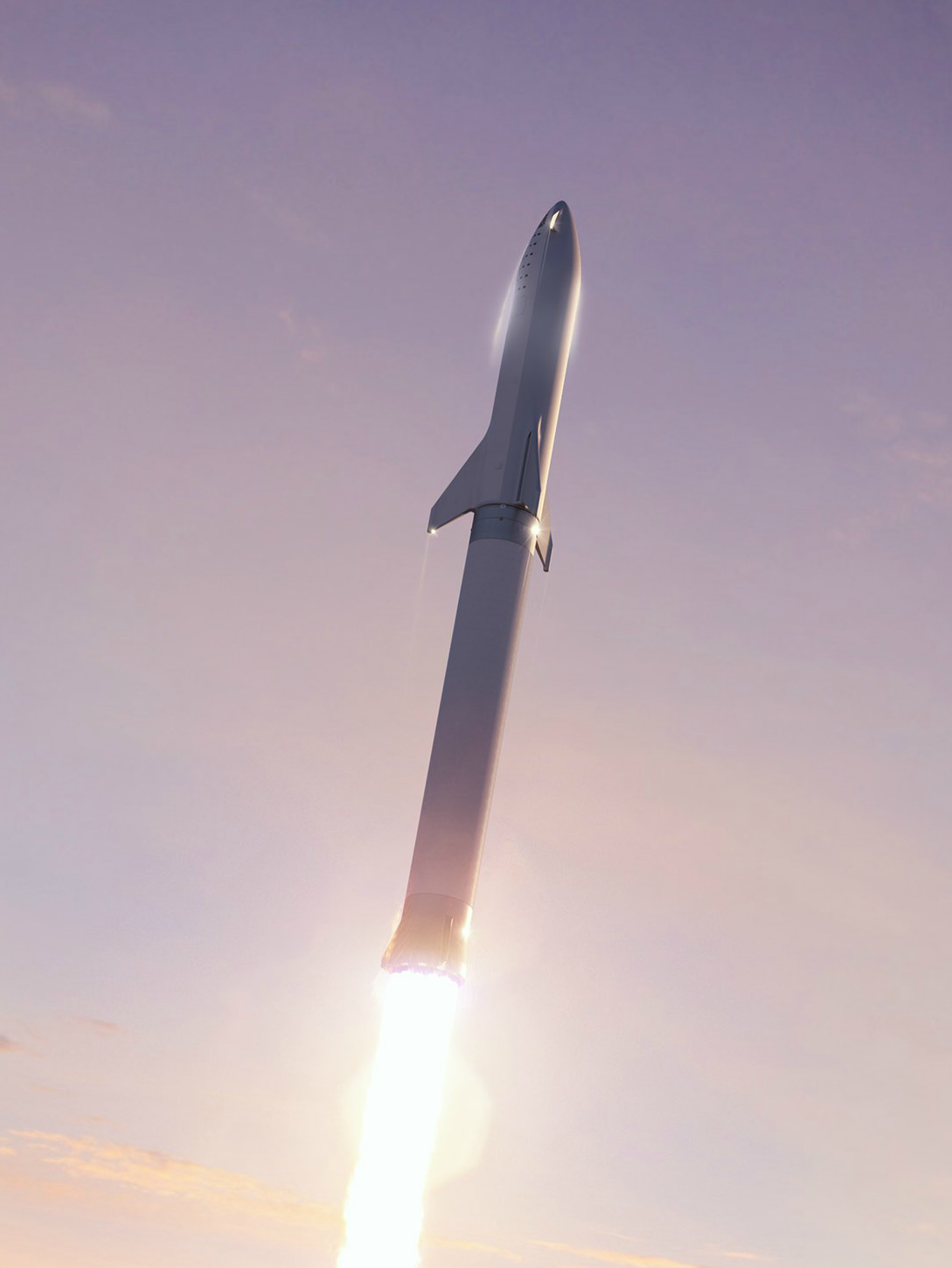
Artist depiction by SpaceX of Big Falcon Rocket in flight

The goal of the Starship launch system is to be a fully reusable orbital launch and reentry vehicle. The Starship launch system consists of two stages: a Super Heavy booster and a Starship spacecraft; both have a body made from SAE 304L stainless steel and are designed to hold liquid oxygen and liquid methane. Super Heavy and then Starship will boost the payload to orbital speed, after which both of them will land and can be used again. Starship can send up to 150 metric tons (330,000 lb) (with full reusability) to low Earth orbit; higher Earth and other orbits are accessible after being refueled by tanker Starships. Future planned Starship variants will be able to land on the Moon and Mars. Starship's design has influenced other launch vehicles, such as the Terran R's partial reusability capability.

=== Design history ===
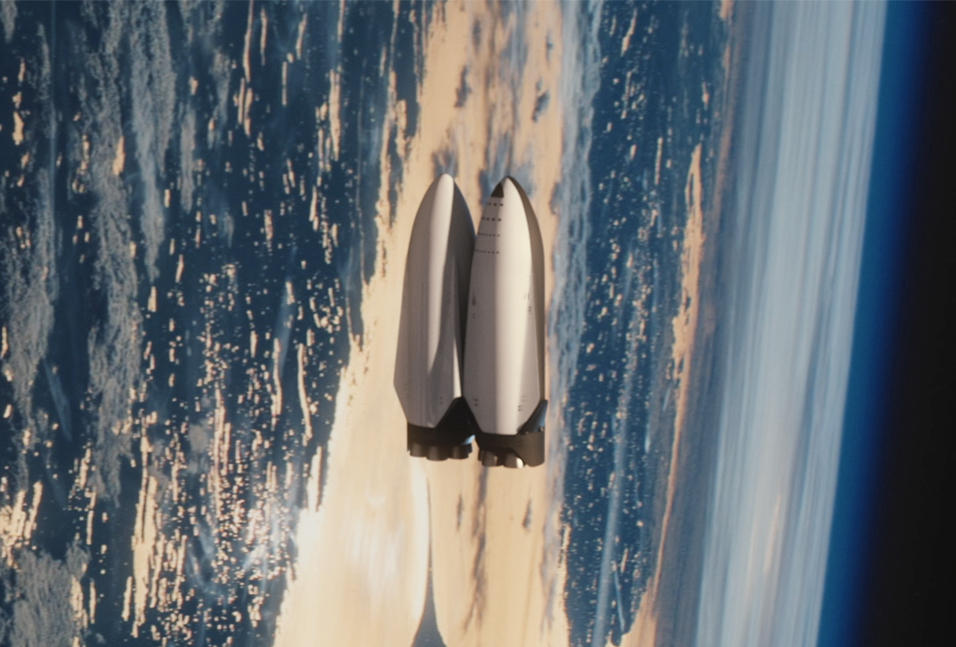
Artist conception of the refueling of a SpaceX Starship by a refueling tanker in Earth orbit (2016)

The first reference by SpaceX of a rocket concept with Starship lifting capabilities was in 2005. In a student conference, Musk briefly mentioned a theoretical heavy‑lift launch vehicle code-named BFR, later known as the Falcon XX. It would be powered by a larger version of the Merlin engine, called Merlin 2, and feature a lifting capability of 140 metric tons (310,000 lb) to low Earth orbit. In 2012, in a public discussion about a conceptual Mars colonization program, Musk described the Mars Colonial Transporter. He envisioned it as a reusable super heavy-lift launch vehicle that could deliver approximately 150 to 200 metric tons (330,000 to 440,000 lb) to low Earth orbit. The Mars Colonial Transporter might be powered by Raptor engines, consuming liquid methane and liquid oxygen.

In September 2016, at the 67th International Astronautical Congress, Musk announced the Interplanetary Transport System (ITS), a conceptual reusable rocket conceived to launch humans to Mars and other destinations in the Solar System. The ITS was to be 122 m (400 ft) tall, 12 m (39 ft) wide, and capable of lifting 300 metric tons (660,000 lb) to low Earth orbit. Both stages were to be made from carbon composites. The first stage or booster was to be powered by 42 Raptor engines, and the second stage by nine Raptors. Once refueled while in Earth orbit, the spacecraft could accelerate to Mars. When an Interplanetary Spaceship enters the atmosphere, it cools itself via transpiration and controls the spacecraft's descent by moving its delta wings and split flaps. At the following Congress, Musk announced a replacement rocket called the Big Falcon Rocket (BFR) or informally Big Fucking Rocket. The Big Falcon Rocket is 106 m (348 ft) tall and 9 m (30 ft) wide. In that conference, he talked about a possible suborbital transportation feature and termed it Earth to Earth.

In November 2018, the present names were first used: Super Heavy for the booster, Starship for the spacecraft, and Starship system or just Starship for the whole vehicle. Around that time, Musk announced a redesigned spacecraft concept with three aft flaps and two forward flaps. In January 2019, Musk announced that Starship would be made from stainless steel and stated that this might be stronger than an equivalent carbon composite in a wide range of temperatures. In March, Musk tweeted that SpaceX opted for a heat shield composed of hexagonal ceramic tiles instead of transpiration. In October, the Starship spacecraft's engine configuration was changed to three Raptors optimized for atmospheric pressure and three optimized for space. The number of rear fins was reduced from three to two and placed at the heat shield's edges.

=== Testing ===
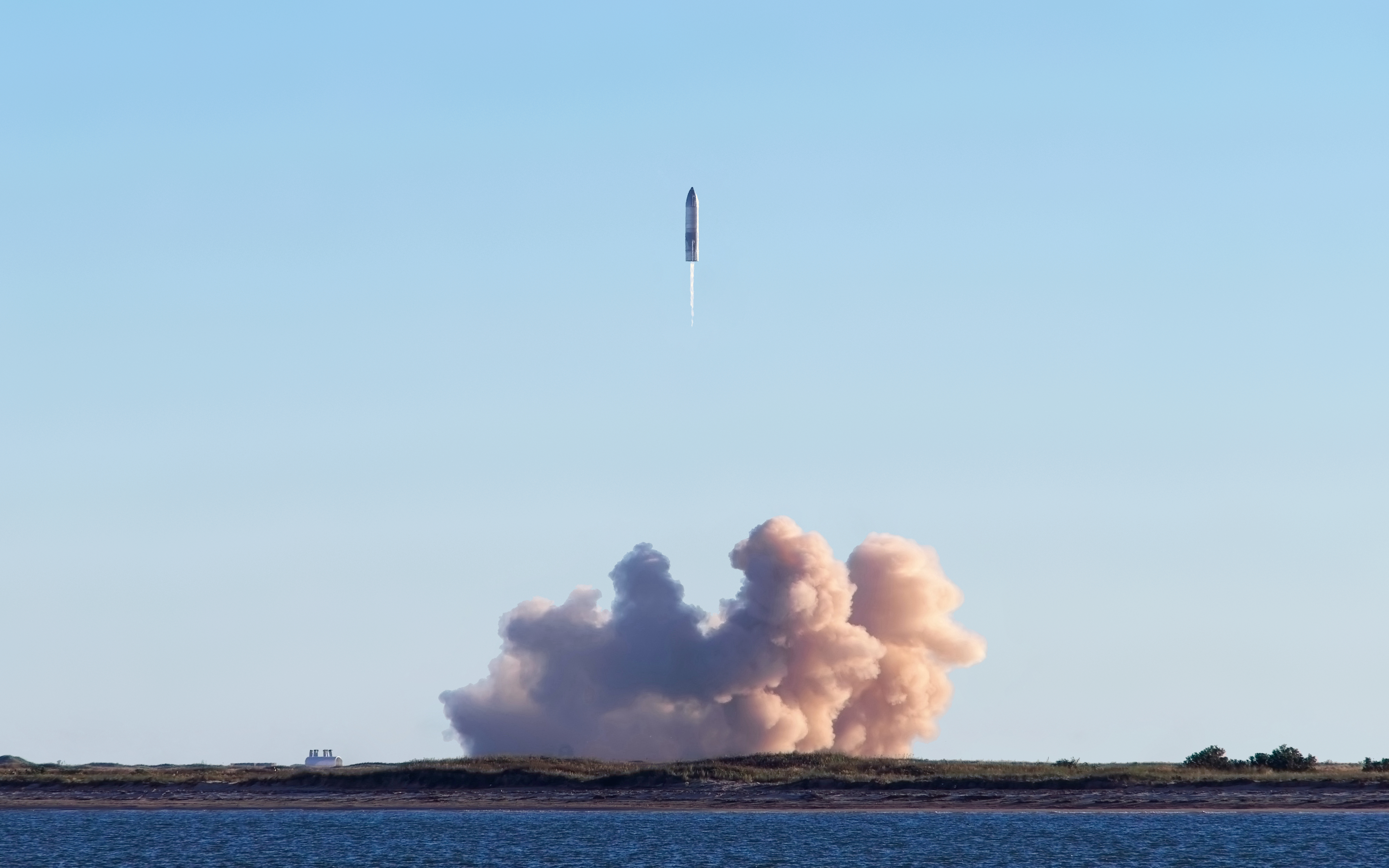
SN8 launch at the Boca Chica launch site, firing three Raptors

On 27 August 2019, a simplified test article named Starhopper hopped 150 m (490 ft) high. Unveiled in a SpaceX event in September 2019, Starship Mk1 (Mark 1) was the first full‑scale Starship test article to be built. The Mk2 in Florida was constructed five months later. Neither flew: Mk1 was destroyed during a cryogenic proof test and Mk2 was scrapped. In early 2020, SpaceX changed Mk3's name to SN1 (serial number 1). During a cryogenic proof test on 28 February 2021, a fault in SN1's bottom tank caused it to crumble. On 8 March 2020, SN2's stripped-down test tank completed its only cryogenic proof test. On 3 April 2020, during SN3's cryogenic proof test, a valve leaked the liquid nitrogen inside its lower tank, causing the vessel to depressurize and collapse. After SN4's fifth successful static fire test on 29 May 2020, the quick disconnect fuel line caused it to explode. On 15 June 2020, Musk tweeted that new prototypes would be made from SAE 304L instead of 301 stainless steel. On 4 August 2020, SN5 completed a 150 m (490 ft) hop using a single Raptor engine, the first full-scale test article to complete a flight test intact. On 24 August 2020, SN6 replicated SN5's flight path successfully. SN7 was not completed, but as of October 2021, its tanks were salvaged for various experiments.

SN8 was the first complete test article. In October and November 2020, SN8 underwent four static fire tests; the first, second, and fourth were successful, but the third caused an engine shutdown. According to Musk, the force from the engine destroyed parts of the launch pad sending some pieces of it into the engine. On 9 December 2020, SN8 performed the first flight by a Starship, reaching an altitude of 12.5 km (7.8 mi). During landing, its methane header tank did not provide sufficient fuel to the Raptor engines, reducing thrust from one engine. The test article exploded on impact. On 2 February 2021, SN9 flew 10 km (6.2 mi) high. While descending, one of its engines did not function and burst on landing at an angle. On 3 March 2021, SN10 repeated SN9's flight path, then hard landed and destroyed itself in an explosion 8 minutes later.

The first Super Heavy booster named BN1 (booster number 1) finished construction on 8 March 2021, but it had not received engines. On 30 March 2021, SN11 exploded in midair without a confirmed explanation because of the dense fog at the launch site. A possible explanation is that an engine might have burned the test article's avionics and could have caused a hard start on the engine's turbopump. After the launch, SpaceX skipped SN12, SN13, SN14, and BN2, and incorporated obsolete test articles' improvements to SN15 instead. On 5 May 2021, the test article flew the same flight path as previous test articles and soft landed successfully. On 20 July 2021, BN3 fired its engines for the only time. As of October 2021, SN15, SN16, and BN3 had been retired and put on display.

After the flight of SN15, SpaceX ended the suborbital flight campaign and tested prototypes on the ground for almost two years. Booster 3 performed a first static fire test in July 2021, later boosters performed static fire tests with an increasing number of engines. Stacking a ship on top of a booster was first tested in August 2021 with Ship 20 and Booster 4. In parallel, the orbital launch mount was upgraded to support a launch.

Booster 7 and Ship 24 launched for a first integrated flight test on 20 April 2023, planned to fly 3/4 of an orbit and reenter over the ocean near Hawaii. The rocket cleared the launch pad and flew for three minutes but several booster engines failed during the flight and the rocket eventually lost control before stage separation, reaching a maximum altitude of 39 km (24 mi). The flight termination system was triggered and a subsequent explosion destroyed the vehicle. The launch broke the concrete pad under the launch mount, resulting in SpaceX replacing it with a water-cooled steel plate for subsequent launches.

Booster 9 and Ship 25 launched on the second integrated flight test on 18 November 2023, which had an identical planned trajectory to the first flight. Unlike Booster 7, Booster 9 had no engine failures until the beginning of the boostback burn, when it exploded. Ship 25 reached a final velocity of over 15,000 mph before being destroyed by its flight termination system.

Booster 10 and Ship 28 were flown on Integrated Flight Test 3, on March 14, 2024. It had a different trajectory than the previous two launches, targeting a hard splashdown of the ship in the Indian Ocean. During ascent and boostback, there were no engine failures, though during the landing burn, all but one of B10s center engines failed. S28 had an aborted raptor relight attempt, and burned up during reentry.

On June 6, 2024, SpaceX launched Booster 11 and Ship 29 on the IFT-4 mission. After shutting off one engine shortly after liftoff, Starship continued on a trajectory similar to IFT-3, only without the attempted raptor relight. After performing its boostback burn and jettisoning the hot-staging ring, Super Heavy successfully reentered and landed, with SpaceX executive Bill Gerstenmaier saying that it landed within half a centimeter of accuracy. Starship continued to its planned orbit and began reentry around 40 minutes later. It demonstrated far better attitude control than Ship 28 but had plasma burn through its flaps during the more intense parts of reentry. Despite the significant damage to the flaps, which Starship relied on for aerodynamic control, a successful water landing was achieved, albeit 6 kilometers off target.

Booster 12 and Ship 30 launched on October 13, 2024. The booster kept all thirty-three engines lit until stage separation, before performing a successful boostback burn. The vehicle reentered, and was successfully caught by the launch tower. Ship 30 reached the desired trajectory, and retained attitude control until entry. It suffered minimal damage to the flaps during reentry, and achieved a successful landing burn on target.

Pictures of Starship test articles

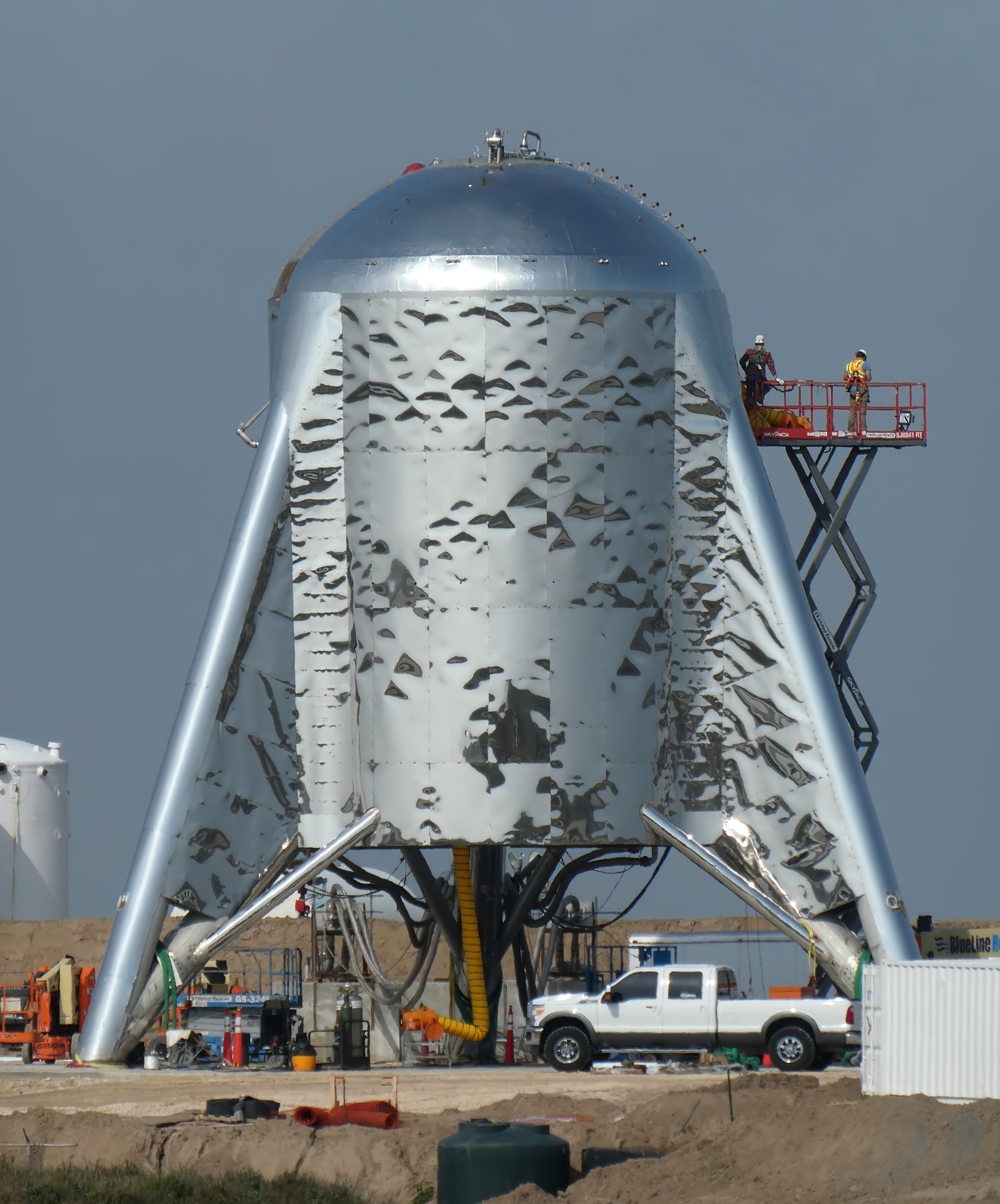
Starhopper in construction

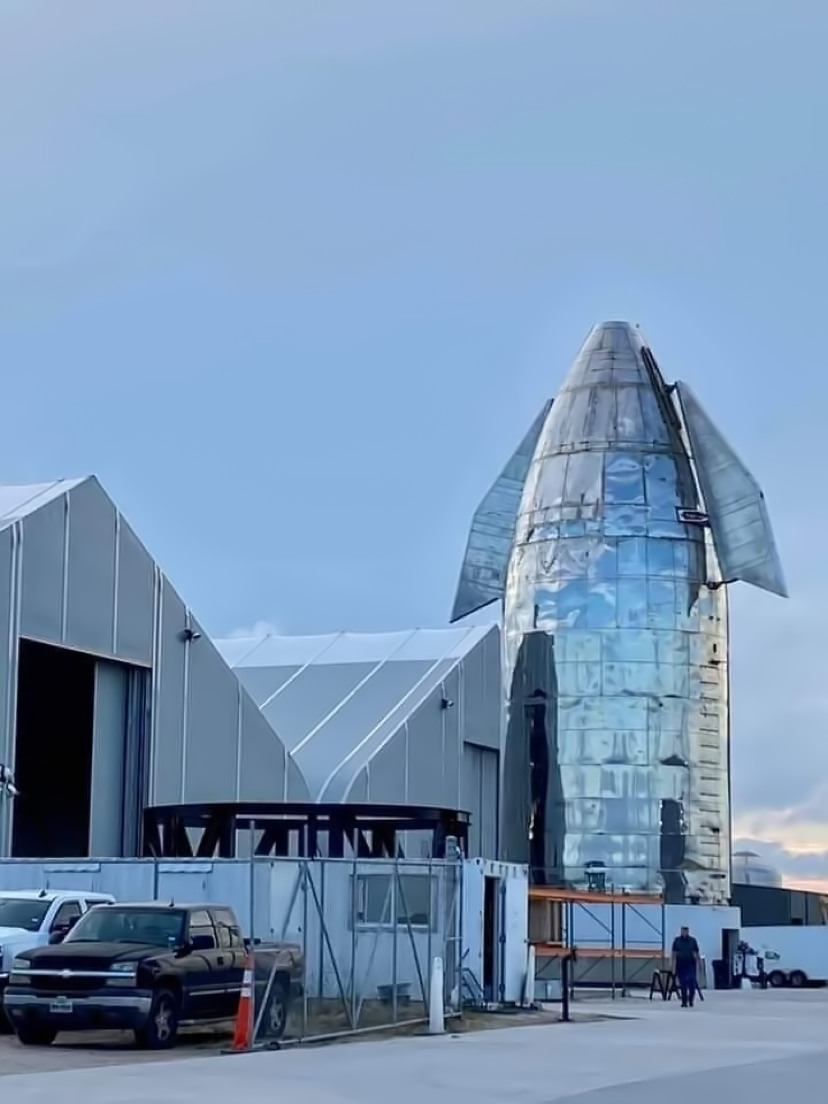
Starship Mk1's nose cone near construction tents

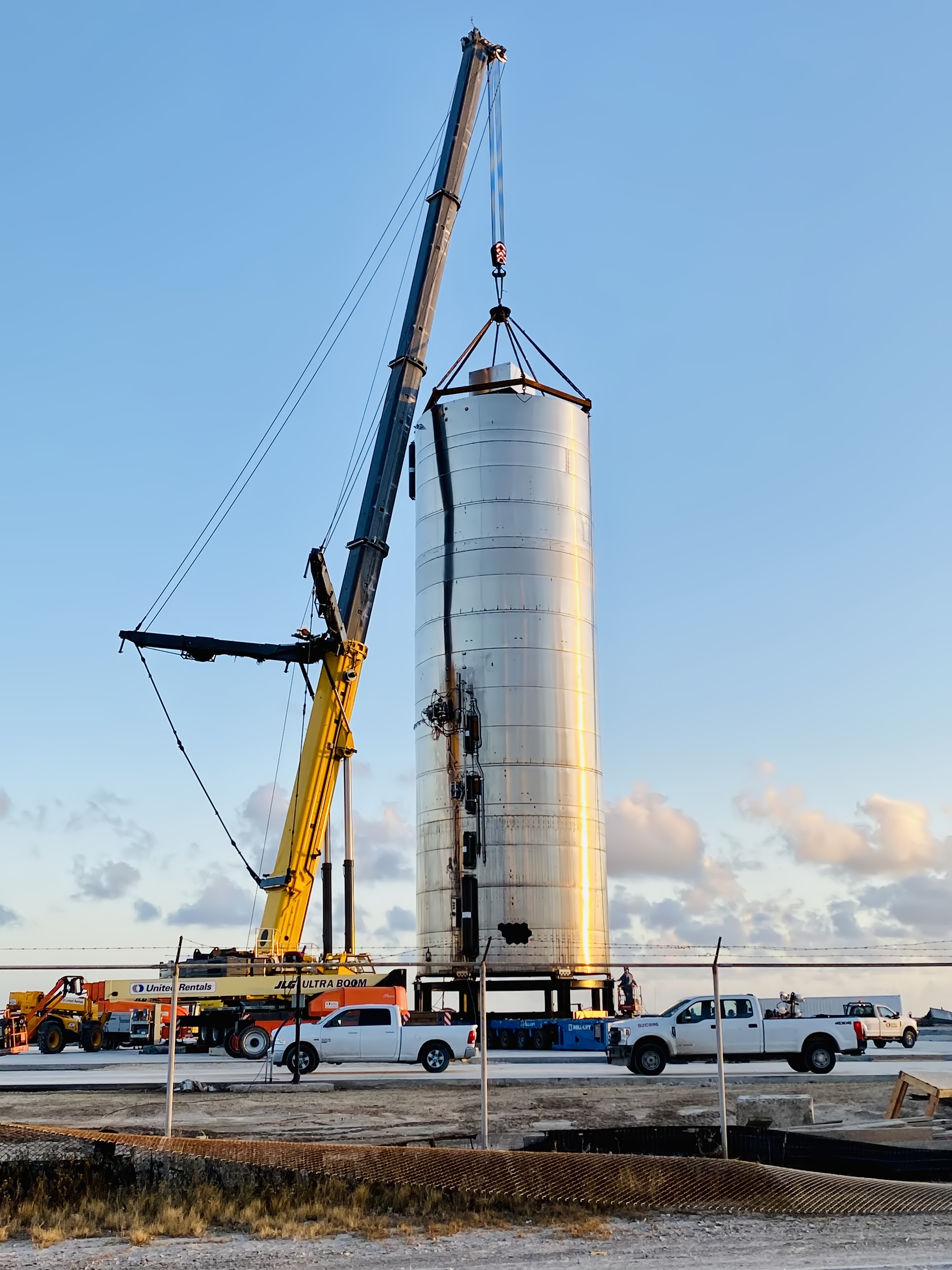
A crane lifting Starship SN5

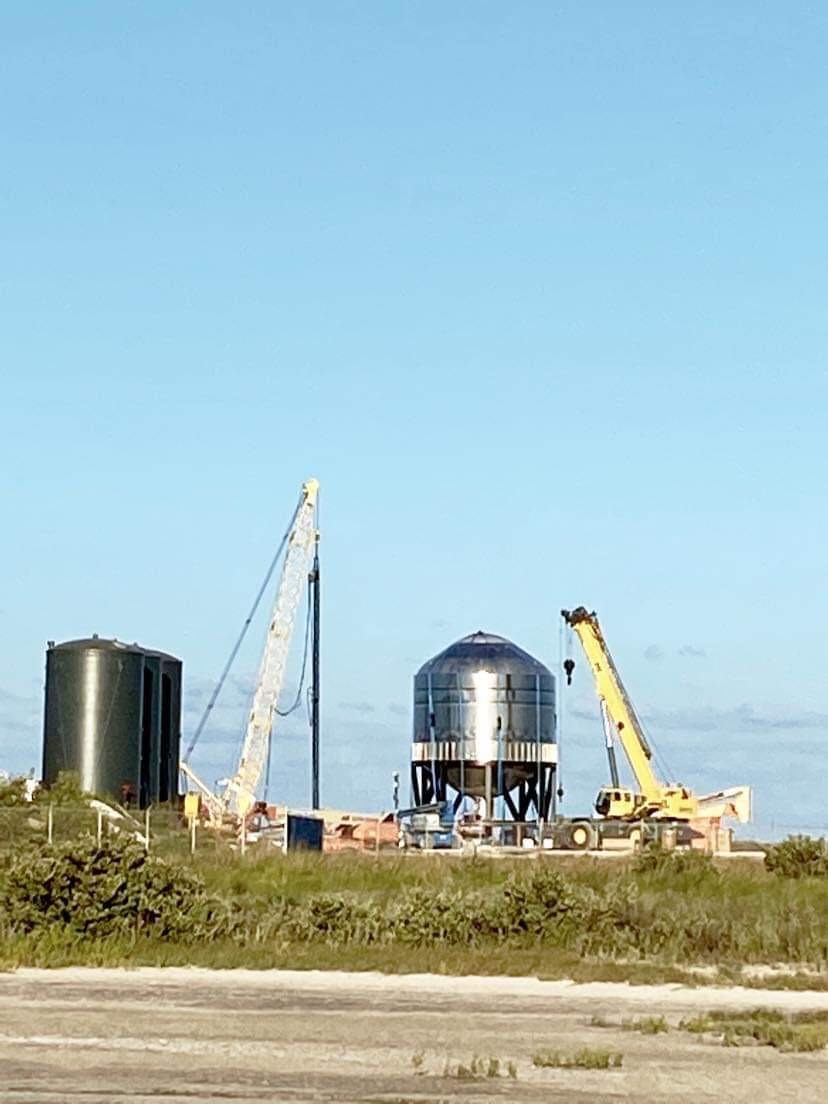
Starship SN7's tank

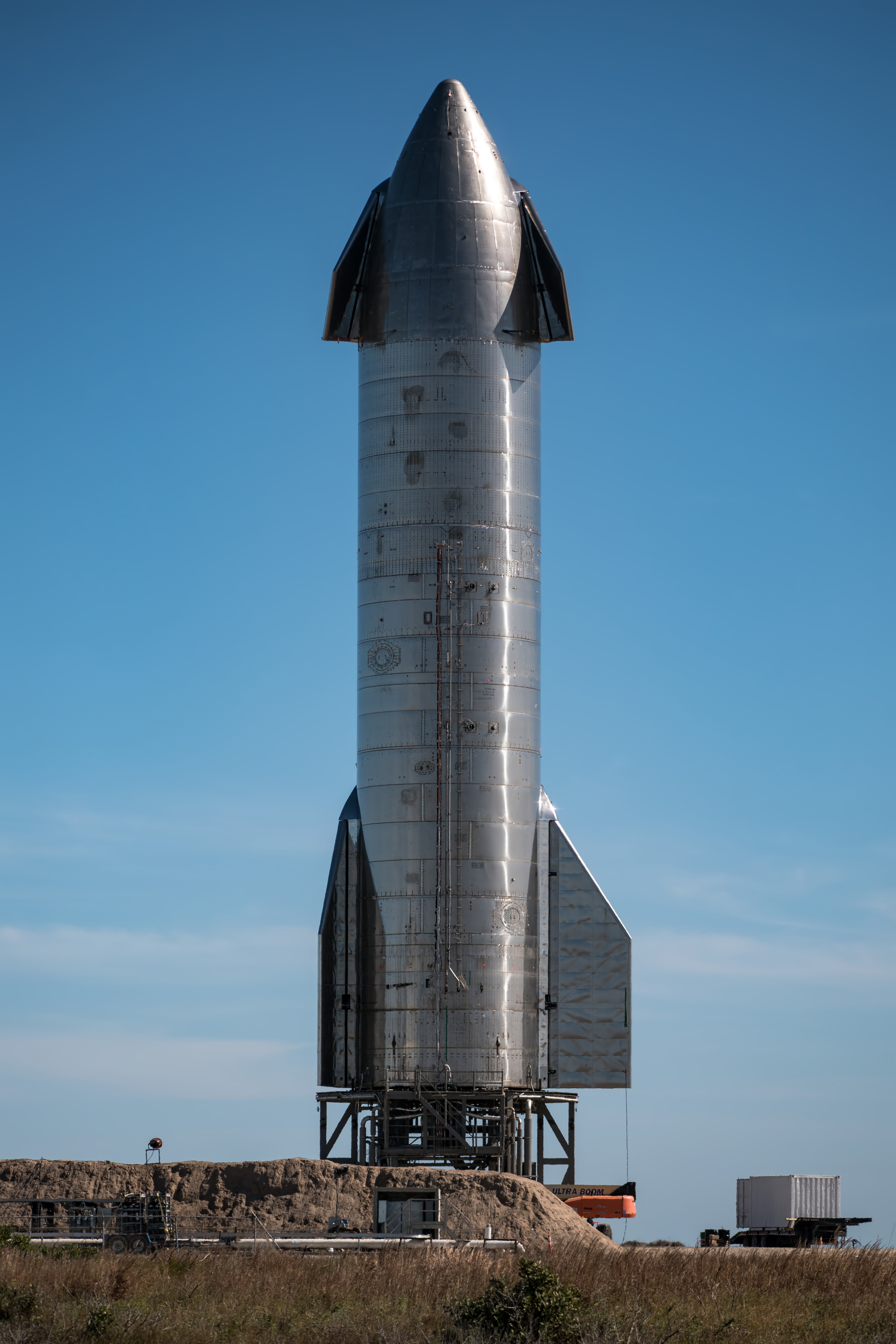
Starship SN9 on the launchpad

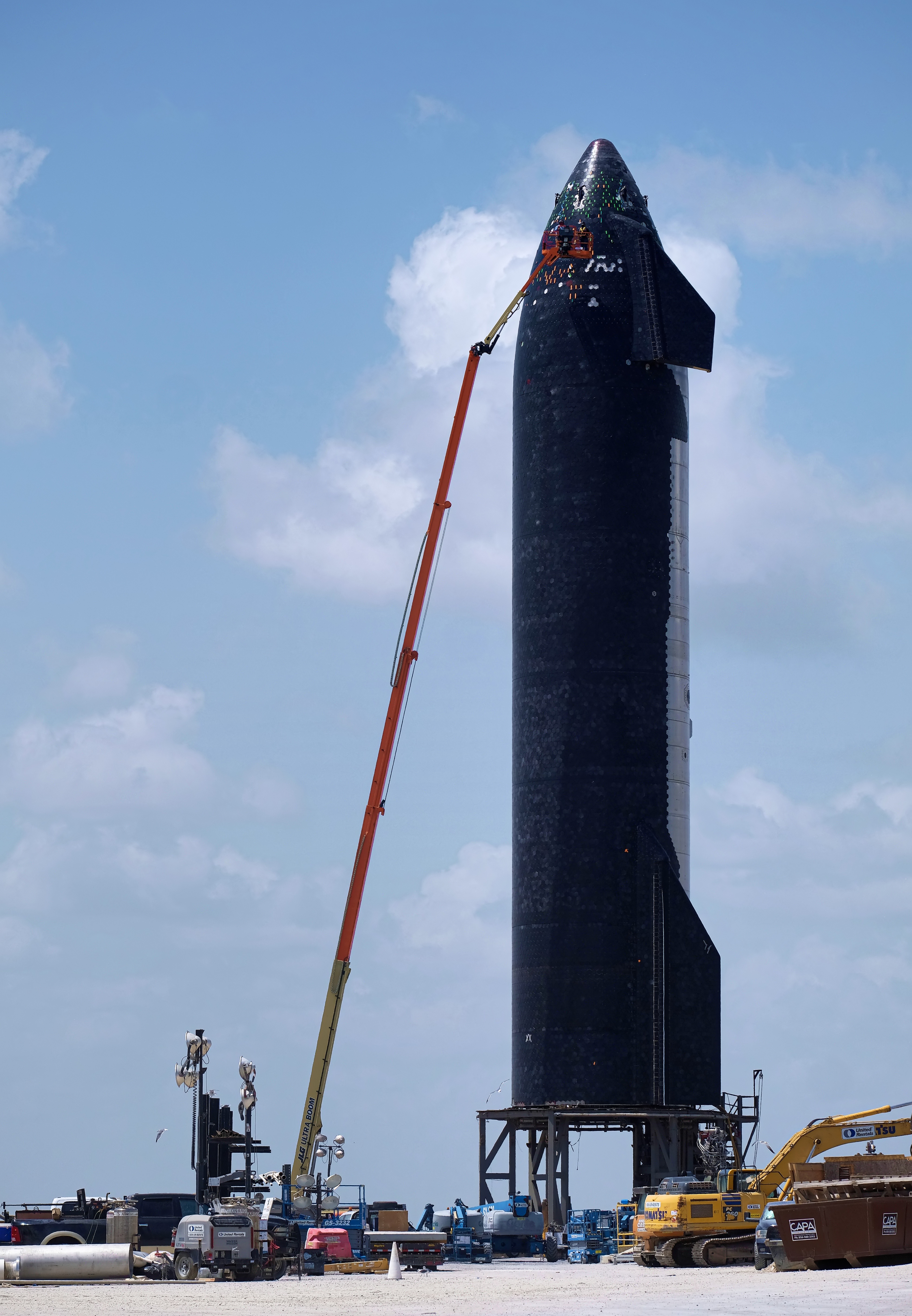
A worker examining Starship SN20's ceramic tiles

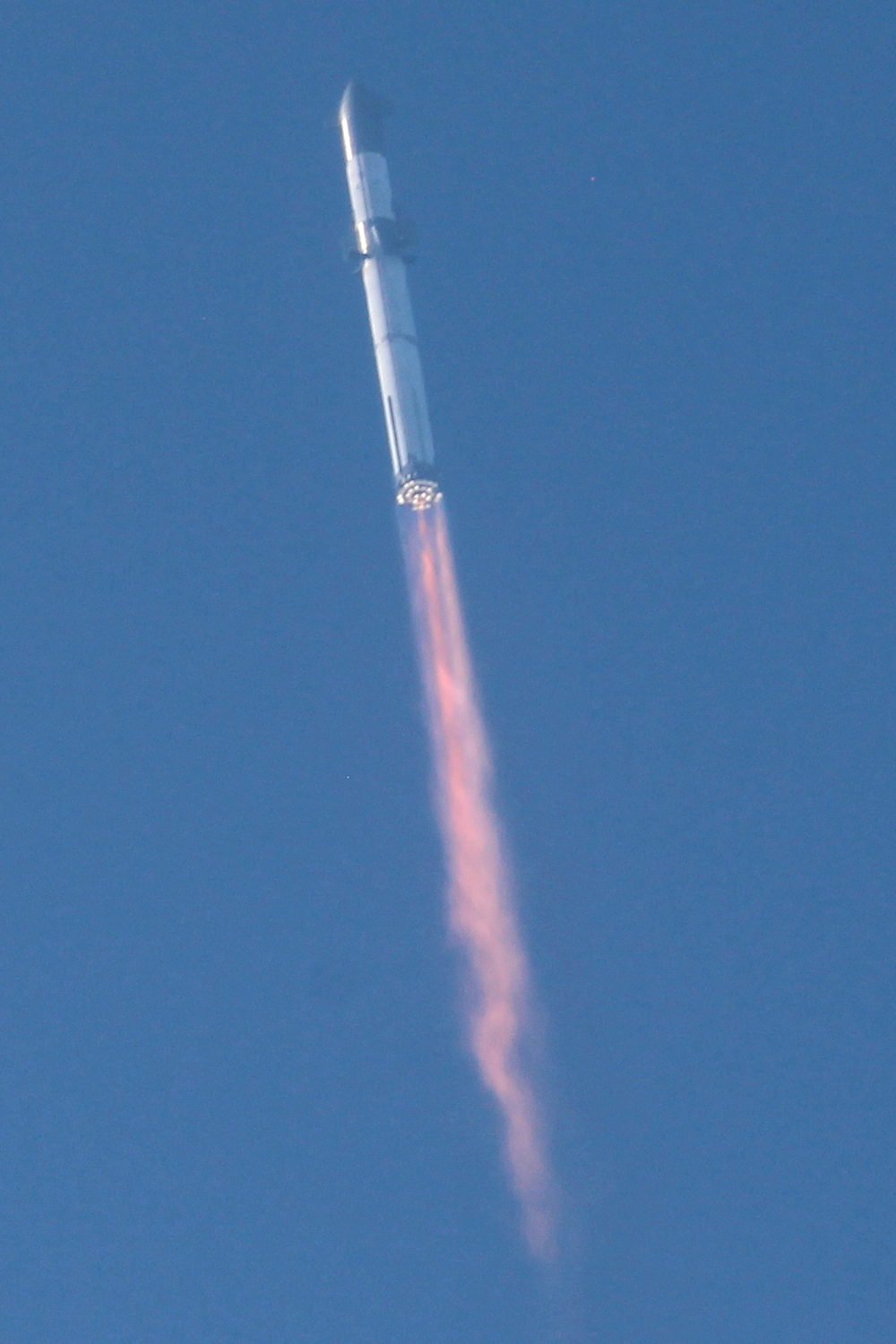
Booster 7 and Ship 24 in flight

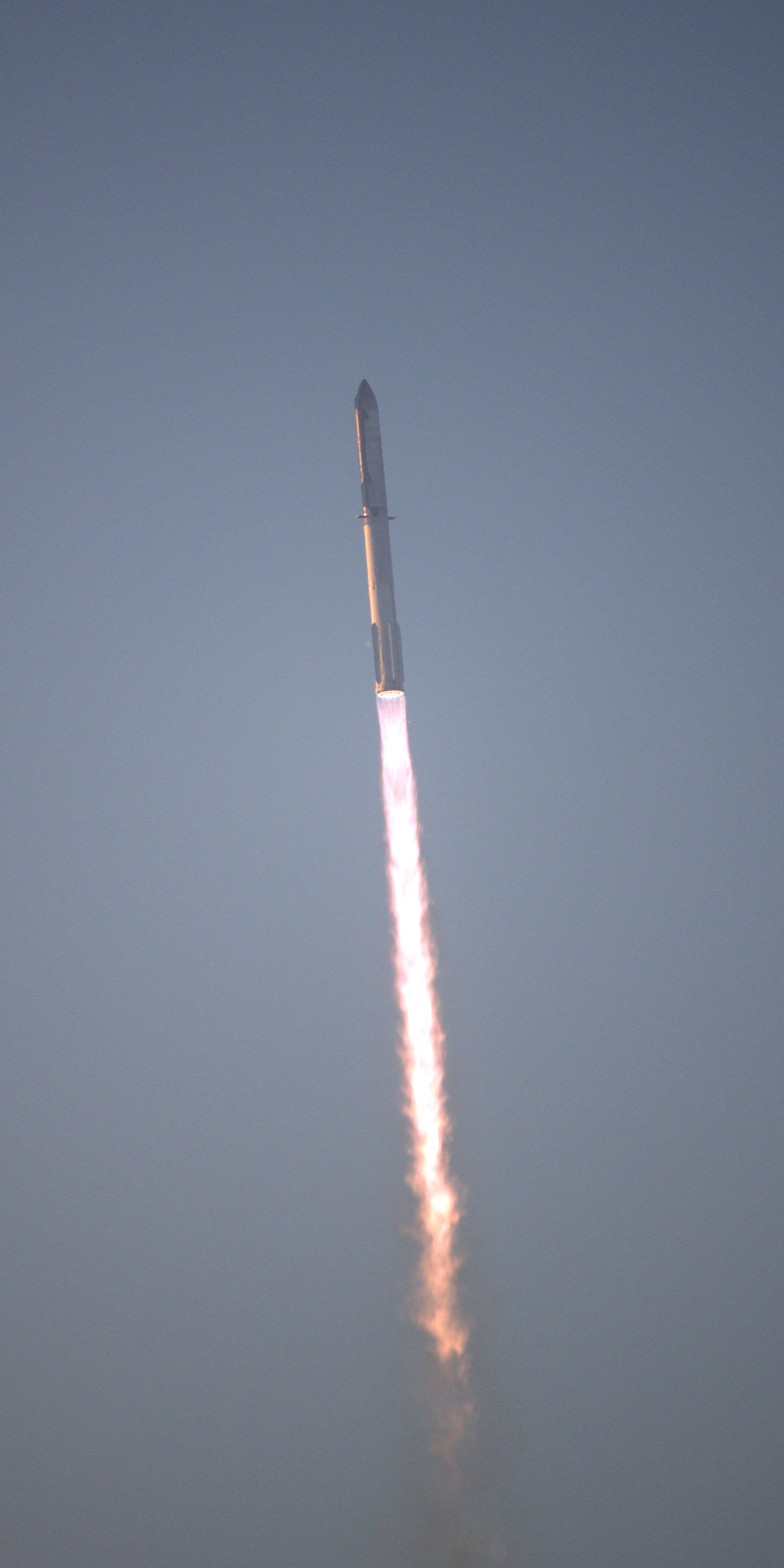
Ship 25 and Booster 9

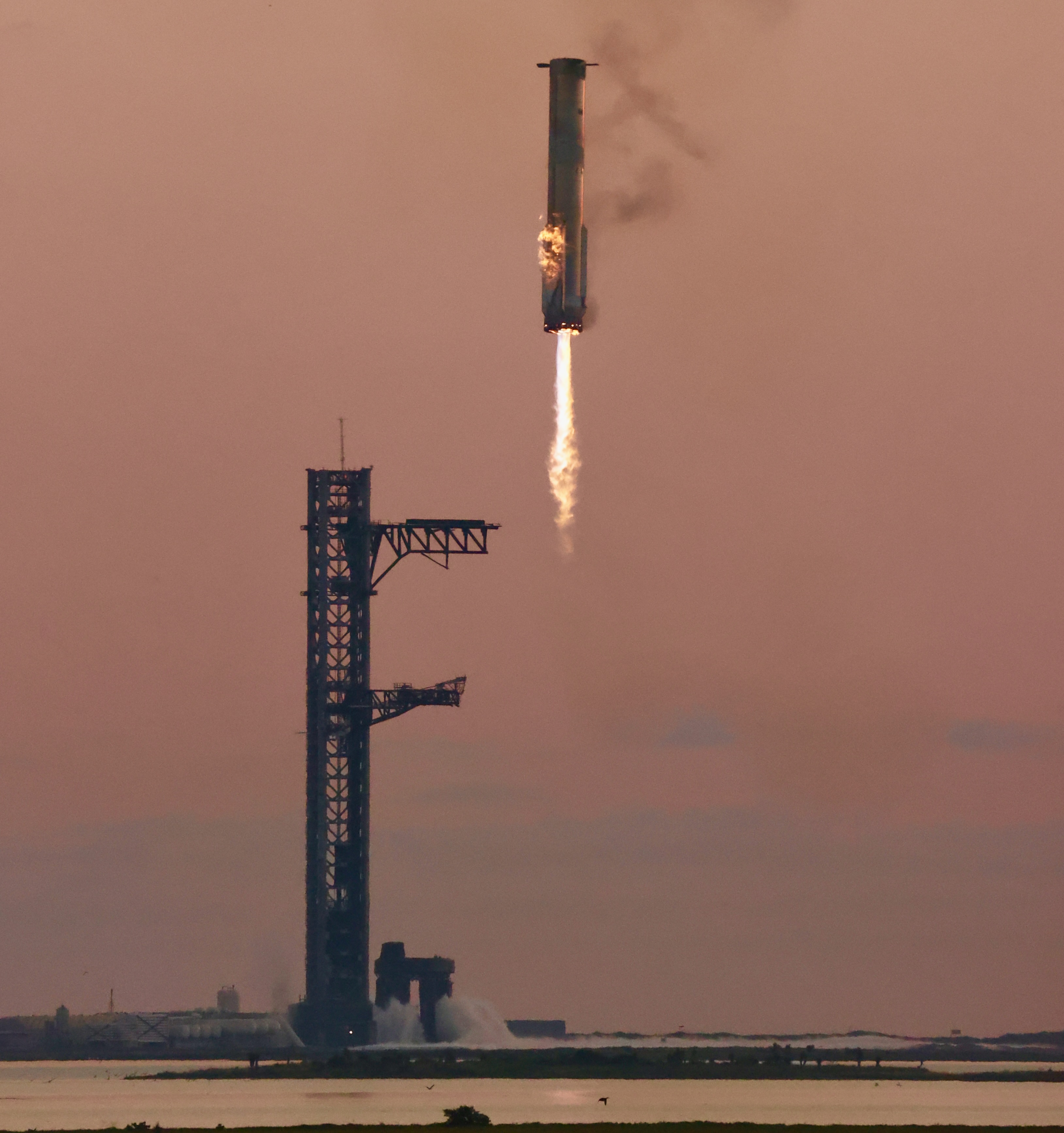
Booster 12 descending towards the launch tower

== See also ==
- New Shepard, a sub-orbital VTVL system
- Grasshopper
