= SpaceX fairing recovery program =

SpaceX fairing catching and wet recovery vessels

Ms. Tree
- Ms. Tree during its second successful catch of a fairing in 2019

History
- Name: Ms. Tree since June 2019; Mr. Steven 2014–2019
- Owner: Guice Offshore June 2019–present; SeaTran Marine 2014–2019
- Operator: Guice Offshore
- Builder: Gulf Craft
- Christened: November 2014
- Identification: Call sign: WDH8234; IMO number: 9744465; MMSI number: 338358000; USCG doc no. 1249191

General characteristics
- Type: Platform supply vessel
- Tonnage: 496 DWT; 96 GT; 65 NT
- Length: 205 ft (62 m)
- Beam: 34 ft (10 m)
- Draft: 5 ft (1.5 m)
- Depth: 13 ft (4.0 m)
- Installed power: 10,300 bhp (7,700 kW)
- Propulsion: 4 × Cat 3516C DH
- Speed: 32 knots (59 km/h; 37 mph)
- Capacity: 84 (maximum)

The SpaceX fairing recovery program was an experimental program by SpaceX, begun in 2017 in an effort to economically recover and reuse expended launch vehicle payload fairings from suborbital space. The experimental program became an operational program as, by late 2020, the company was routinely recovering fairings from many flights, and by 2021 were successfully refurbishing and reflying previously flown fairings on the majority of their satellite launches.

During the early years of the program, SpaceX attempted to catch the descending payload fairings, under parachute, in a very large net on a moving ship in the Atlantic Ocean east of the Space Coast of Florida. Two former platform supply vessels—Ms. Tree, formerly known as Mr. Steven, and its sister ship, Ms. Chief—were chartered by SpaceX and used 2018–2021 as experimental platforms for recovery of rocket fairings from Falcon 9 orbital launch trajectories. These fast ships were retrofitted with large nets intended to catch fairings—and prevent the fairings from making contact with seawater—as part of an iterative development program to create technology that will eventually allow rocket payload fairings to be economically reused and reflown. Ms. Tree was used for SpaceX Falcon 9 fairing recovery experiments on a number of occasions in 2018 and early 2019, while named Mr. Steven. Ms. Tree first successfully caught a fairing on 25 June 2019 during Falcon Heavy launch 3, which carried the DoD's STP-2 mission. This was the ship's first fairing recovery voyage after its renaming, change of ownership, and net upgrade. By 2020, the program reached operational status where fairings from most Falcon 9 satellite launches were recovered, either "in the net" or from the water, and for the first time, both fairing halves of a single flight were caught in the nets of two different ships. The final fairing that was successfully caught in a net was in October 2020. In early 2021, the nets were removed from the two fast ships and SpaceX ended the ship leases, with both ships returned to their owner.

SpaceX found that recovery of the fairings floating on the ocean surface was adequate to support economic reuse of payload fairings on subsequent Falcon 9 launches. After the end of the experimental "catch" recovery program, SpaceX entered an operational phase and as of April 2021 was using the contracted ships Shelia Bordelon and Hos Briarwood to recover parachute-descended payload fairings that reached the sea surface in good condition using ship mounted cranes.

In May 2021, SpaceX purchased and began converting two offshore supply ships named Ella G and Ingrid for towing and supporting droneships as well as fairing recovery operations on the east coast. They are registered to Falcon Landing LLC, a SpaceX-linked company that also owns Elon Musk's private jet. These two ships were renamed in honor of Demo-2 astronauts Doug Hurley and Bob Behnken as Doug and Bob respectively for their contribution to SpaceX's Crew Dragon development. Currently, both support ships Bob and Doug are operating out of Port Canaveral, Florida along with other SpaceX recovery assets. To ease the recovery of these fairings out of water, SpaceX bought two small fast boats in February 2022, Maverick and Goose, named for Top Gun characters Pete "Maverick" Mitchell (Tom Cruise) and Nick "Goose" Bradshaw (Anthony Edwards), for both of these multipurpose ships.

SpaceX performs some amount of cleaning and refurbishing before using the previously flown fairings on a subsequent flight. SpaceX has reflown fairing halves more than 300 times, with one being reflown for 36 times.

== History ==
Ms. Tree was originally built in 2014 for SeaTran as a platform supply vessel to support fast crew transport operations. The vessel was named Mr. Steven after Steven Miguez, the father of SeaTran CEO Blake J. Miguez.

The vessel subsequently was chartered by SpaceX in 2018 for an experimental program to provide surface marine "catch and recovery" operations for a test program attempting to bring the large 5.2 by 13.2 meters (17 ft × 43 ft) Falcon 9 launch vehicle satellite fairings—separated at high speed and high altitude—through atmospheric reentry and parachute descent to the ocean surface in a controlled way, and then recover them for evaluation and potential reuse. Since satellite fairings are traditionally expended into the ocean, the fairings used for these tests were somewhat modified test articles. As part of that effort, Mr. Steven was fitted in July 2018 with four large arms to support an elevated horizontal net, similar to a giant trampoline or trapeze net.

In July 2018, Mr. Steven was upgraded and refitted with a much larger net with an area of 3,700 m^{2} (0.91 acres), four times the original net size. The upgrade included replacing the original rigid arms and fitting four new arms, which are each supported and positioned by two extendable shock-absorbing booms. Each arm can be removed and disassembled into six subsections.

In June 2019, Mr. Steven was renamed Ms. Tree (a play on the word mystery), after being purchased by Guice Offshore (GO), a company with a long-standing contractual relationship to SpaceX as a provider of a variety of marine services.

On June 25, 2019, SpaceX successfully caught its first fairing half on Ms. Tree in the Atlantic Ocean off the Florida coast as part of the Falcon Heavy STP-2 mission.

On August 6, 2019, Ms. Tree was used to successfully catch another fairing half from a Falcon 9 that successfully launched Amos-17. SpaceX now had two complete fairing halves that have reentered from space and been recovered dry, without contacting the saltwater. Although a dry recovery is preferable to maintain a cleaner environment inside the fairing to protect future payloads, eventually SpaceX would drop it as a requirement.

In August 2019, SpaceX chartered the sister ship to Ms. Tree, the Ms. Chief (a play on the word mischief), as the second fairing catcher vessel so that it could be possible to retrieve both halves of the same fairing on a Falcon 9 launch. This second ship is also operated by Guice Offshore, and is therefore titled "GO Ms. Chief" on the ship sides. Ms. Chief was outfitted with a matching set of four wide arms and a catch net by October 2019, in preparation for dual simultaneous fairing recovery attempts.

On 11 November 2019, during the Starlink L1 mission both ships were sent to sea but were recalled due to rough seas so a recovery was not attempted.

On 16 December 2019, both ships were positioned in the Atlantic Ocean for a recovery attempt, but both ships narrowly missed catching the fairing halves.

On 29 January 2020, both ships were positioned for a recovery attempt for the Starlink 3 launch. Ms. Tree caught one fairing half, but Ms. Chief narrowly missed the other fairing half.

On 20 July 2020, both fairing halves were successfully caught for the first time by both ships during the Anasis-2 mission. The final payload fairing ever caught by SpaceX was in October 2020 on the Starlink v1.0 L13 mission. In February 2021, both ships were taken out of service to have their catching arms removed. On 6 April 2021, both ships departed Port Canaveral for the final time with a water salute.

SpaceX abandoned the experimental program to recover descending-under-parachute payload fairings dry, in a net on a fast ship, by April 2021. SpaceX has decided to do "wet recovery" of fairings on future Falcon 9 flights, having found that they can clean, refurbish, and reuse such fairings more economically, and so their subordinate company, Falcon Landing LLC purchased two ships to support wet recovery and droneship operations and named them Bob and Doug. Simultaneously with fairing recovery, they will also support booster towing and recovery missions along with their secondary fast boats, Maverick and Goose.

== Fairing reuse ==
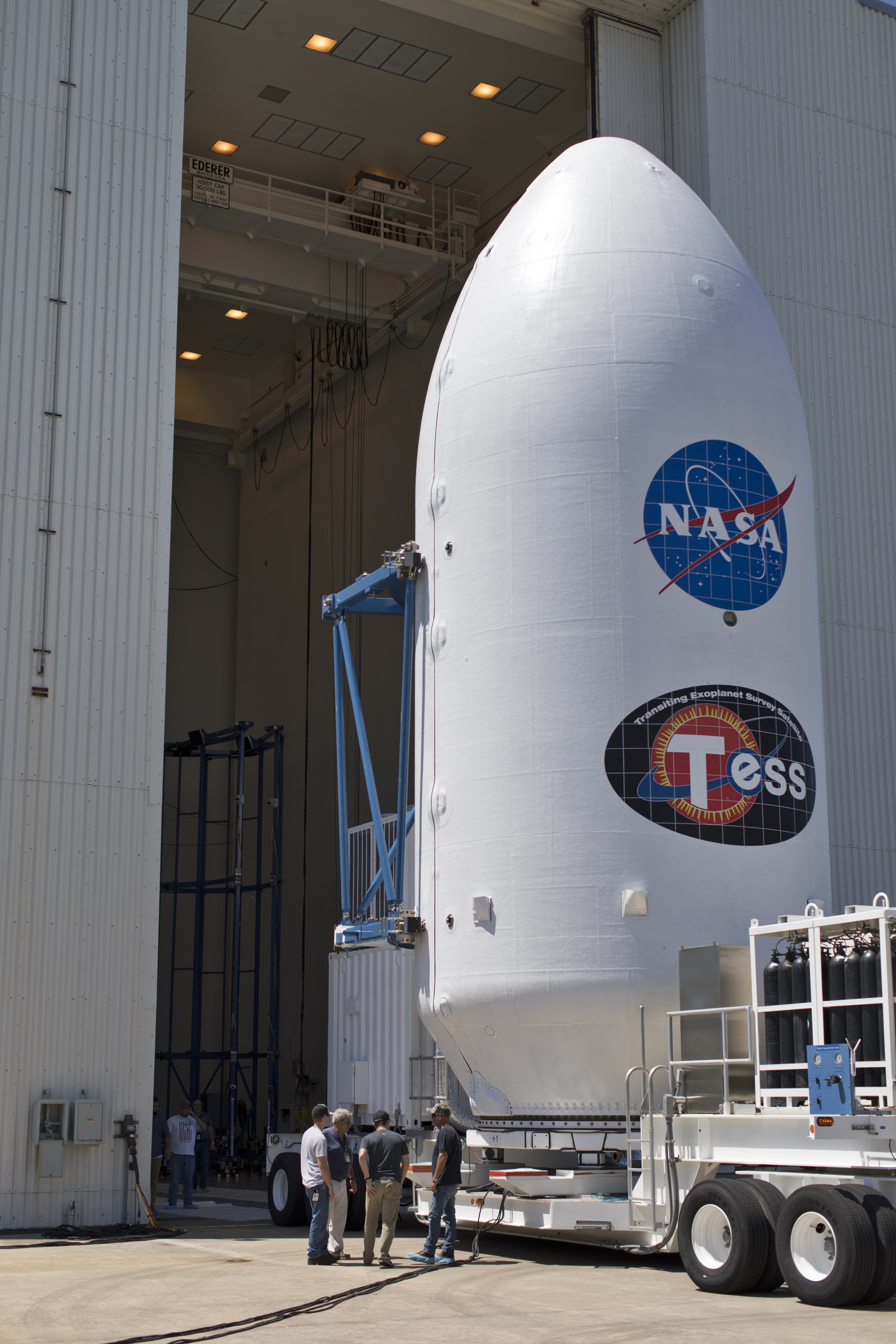
SpaceX payload fairing before the launch of TESS

During the first six decades of spaceflight, payload fairings were expended by atmospheric reentry and allowed to drop into the ocean as debris.

In 2018, SpaceX began flight test experiments with fairings descending from sub-orbital trajectories above the atmosphere on its Falcon 9 rockets.

As a part of the SES-10 mission in March 2017, SpaceX successfully performed a controlled landing of the payload fairing into the ocean for the first time. SpaceX was able to recover the fairing half from the water after it landed, aided by attitude-control thrusters and a steerable parachute, gently on water. At the SES-10 news conference, the company announced its intent to land the fairings on a dry flexible structure, jokingly described by Elon Musk as a "floating bouncy castle", with the goal of reusing the fairings. The cost of a fairing is about $6 million which accounts for 10 percent of overall Falcon 9 launch costs.

The "bouncy castle" idea led to SpaceX contracting for the fast vessel Mr. Steven which was subsequently modified to facilitate a large net being strung between long arms that extend considerably beyond the width of the ship. Mr. Steven was equipped with a dynamic positioning system and was first tested after the launch of the Paz satellite from Vandenberg Air Force Base in February 2018. The test was not fully successful because the fairing missed the boat by a few hundred meters but landed safely in the water before being recovered and taken back to port. All four attempts in the first half of 2018 to land a fairing on the recovery ship failed, despite fitting Mr. Steven with larger nets before the July 2018 attempt.

In October 2018, to practice recovery outside mission situations, SpaceX performed drop tests of a fairing half from a helicopter with Mr. Steven below. The outcome of the tests has not been publicly released.

On the ArabSat-6A mission on April 11, 2019, SpaceX used the recovery boats GO Searcher and GO Navigator to recover both fairing halves quickly after they landed in the sea; Musk declared the recovery successful and reused the fairings in a later Starlink mission. SpaceX used the same recovery method in May 2019 on another Starlink launch.

The first successful fairing catch was made as part of the STP-2 mission on 25 June 2019. The final payload fairing ever caught in a net was in October 2020 on the Starlink v1.0 L13 mission, and fairings began more frequently to be scooped out of the ocean.

By January 2021, SpaceX had modified the design of the fairing to better accommodate water recoveries. The ascent vents on the fairing halves were moved closer to the seam between the two fairing halves "so that water is less likely to enter the fairing through the holes when the halves are floating in the ocean." By April 2021, the company had publicly abandoned net recovery and switched to water recovery as an ordinary operational practice. As of October 27, 2026, SN168 is the oldest, most-flown (40 times; the most reflown rocket piece to space) passive fairing half. On the other hand, SN152 is the oldest active fairing half still in use, while SN155 is the most flown (40 flights) active fairing half. Fastest fairing turnaround time record was achieved by active fairing half, SN237, on its 9th flight, launching 9 days, 8 hours, and 21 minutes after the previous mission.

== See also ==
- Autonomous spaceport drone ship

== External references ==
- Rocket fairing falling from space, with catch by Ms. Tree. SpaceX video, 6 August 2019.
- SpaceX Fleet tribute video, following retirement of the two fairing catcher ships, 6 April 2021.
