= Kibō (ISS module) =

Japanese ISS module, used on ISS press conferences

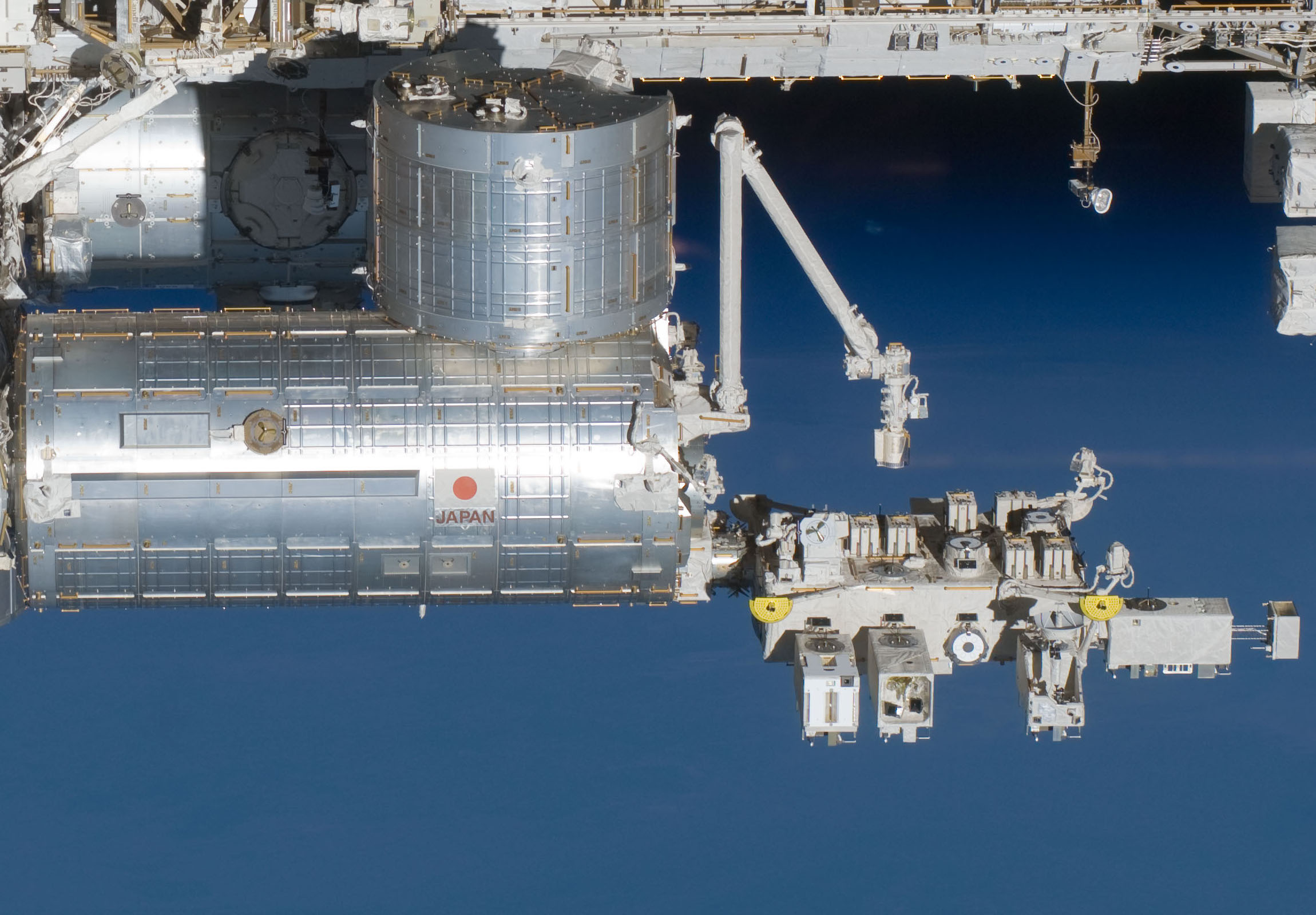
- Kibō showing its main pressurized module, logistics module, exposed facility, and robotic arm, as seen by Space Shuttle Endeavour on STS-134

Module statistics
- Part of: International Space Station
- Launch date: ELM-PS: 11 March 2008, 06:28:14 UTC; PM: 31 May 2008, 21:02:12 UTC; EF: 15 July 2009, 22:03 UTC
- Launch vehicle: Space Shuttle Endeavour and Discovery
- Berthed: 14 March 2008 (Harmony port)
- Mass: 24,200 kg (53,400 lb)
- Length: PM: 11.2 m (37 ft); ELM-PS: 4.2 m (14 ft)
- Diameter: 4.4 m (14 ft)

Configuration
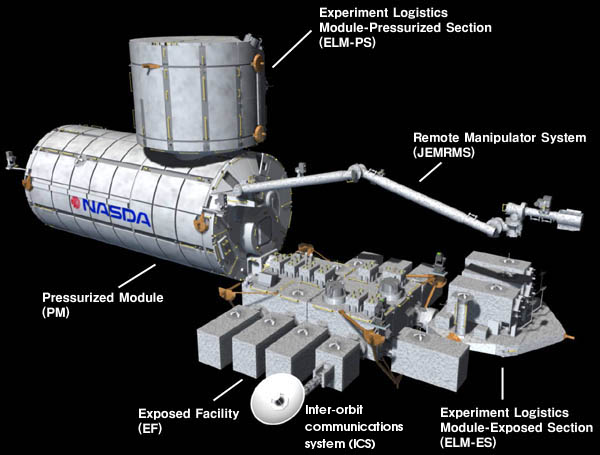

Kibō (Japanese: きぼう; lit. 'Hope'), also known as the Japanese Experiment Module (JEM), is a scientific research module for the International Space Station (ISS) that was developed in Japan by JAXA. It is the largest single ISS pressurized module by volume, attached to the Harmony module, and the second largest space station module ever, after Skylab's core. The first two components of the module were launched on Space Shuttle missions STS-123 and STS-124. The third and final components were launched on mission STS-127.

== Components ==
In initial configuration, Kibō consisted of six major elements:

- Pressurized Module (PM)
- Exposed Facility (EF)
- Experiment Logistics Module (ELM) Pressurized Section (ELM-PS)
- Experiment Logistics Module (ELM) Exposed Section (ELM-ES)
- Japanese Experiment Module remote manipulator system (JEMRMS)
- Inter-orbit communication system (ICS)

=== Pressurized Module ===
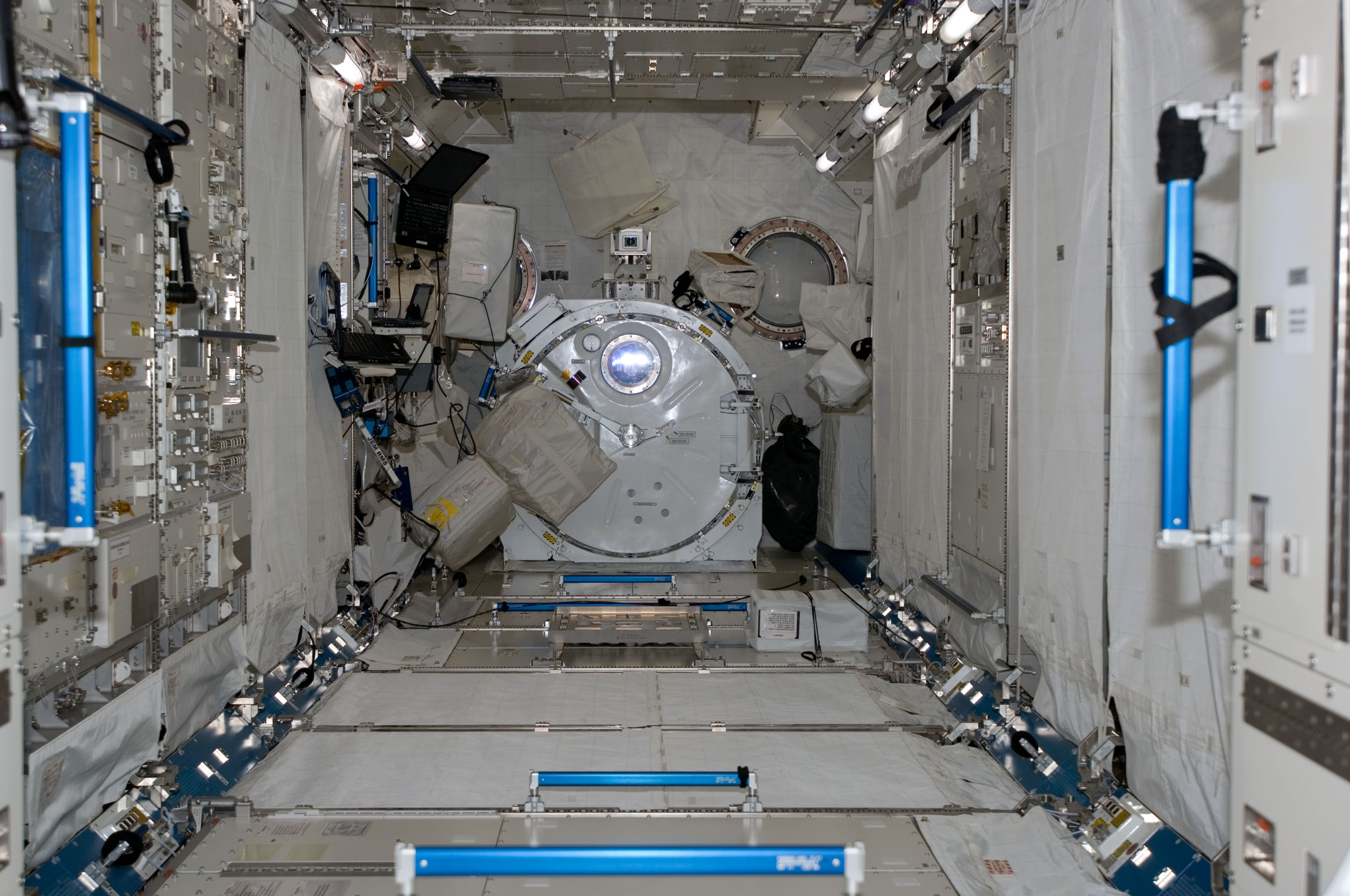
Interior of the pressurized module

The Pressurized Module (PM) is the core component connected to the port hatch of Harmony. It is cylindrical in shape and contains twenty-three International Standard Payload Racks (ISPRs), ten of which are dedicated to science experiments while the remaining thirteen are dedicated to Kibō's systems and storage. The racks are placed in a 6-6-6-5 format along the four walls of the module. The end of the PM has an airlock and two window hatches. The exposed facility, experiment logistics module, and remote manipulator system all connect to the PM. It is the location for many of the press conferences that take place on board the station.

=== Exposed facility ===
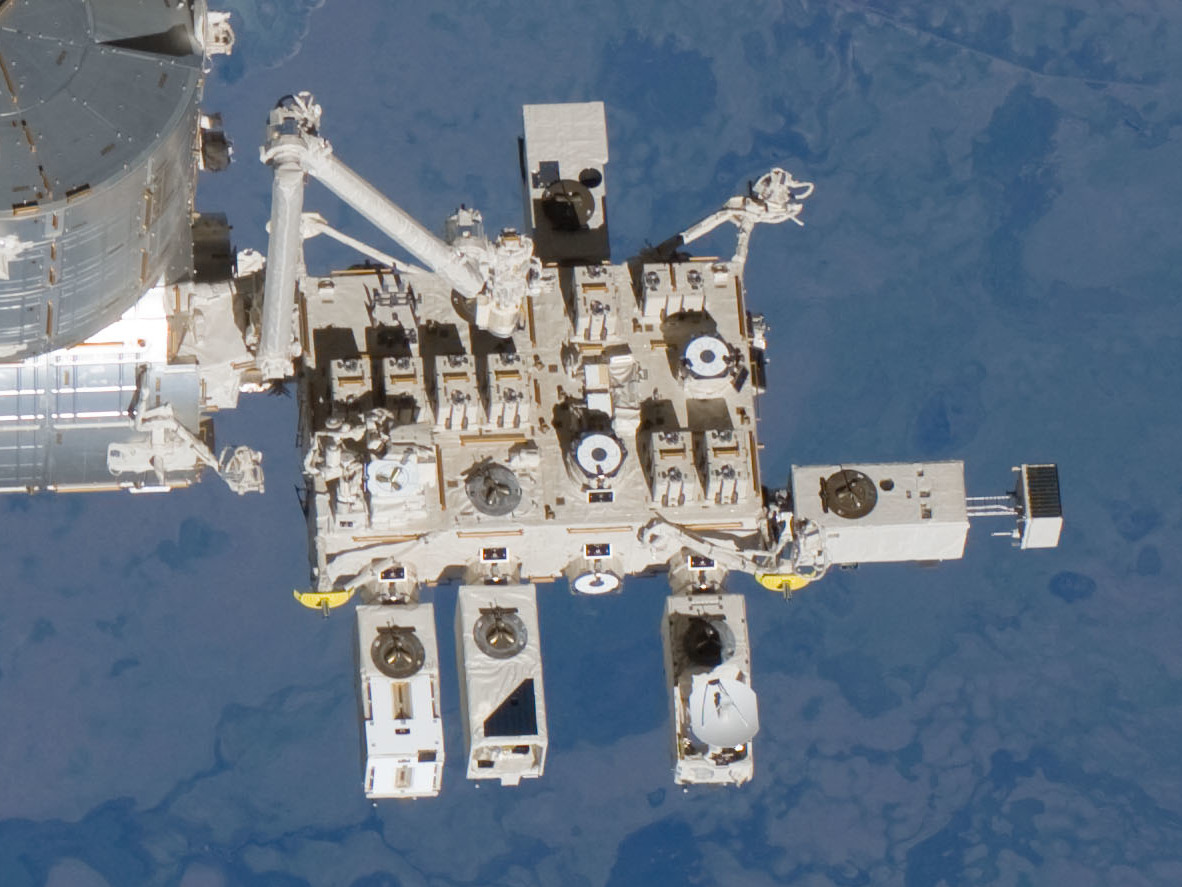
Exposed facility

The Exposed Facility (EF), also known as "Terrace", is located outside the port cone of the PM (which is equipped with an airlock). The EF has twelve Exposed Facility Unit (EFU) ports which attach to Payload Interface Unit (PIU) connectors on EF-equipment exchange units (EF-EEUs). All experiment payloads are fully exposed to the space environment. For proper functioning of these experiments, the payload requires an orbital replacement unit (ORU), consisting of the electrical power system (EPS), communications and tracking (CT), and the thermal control system (TCS). Of the twelve ORUs, eight are replaceable by the JEMRMS while the other four are EVA-replaceable.

=== Logistics module ===
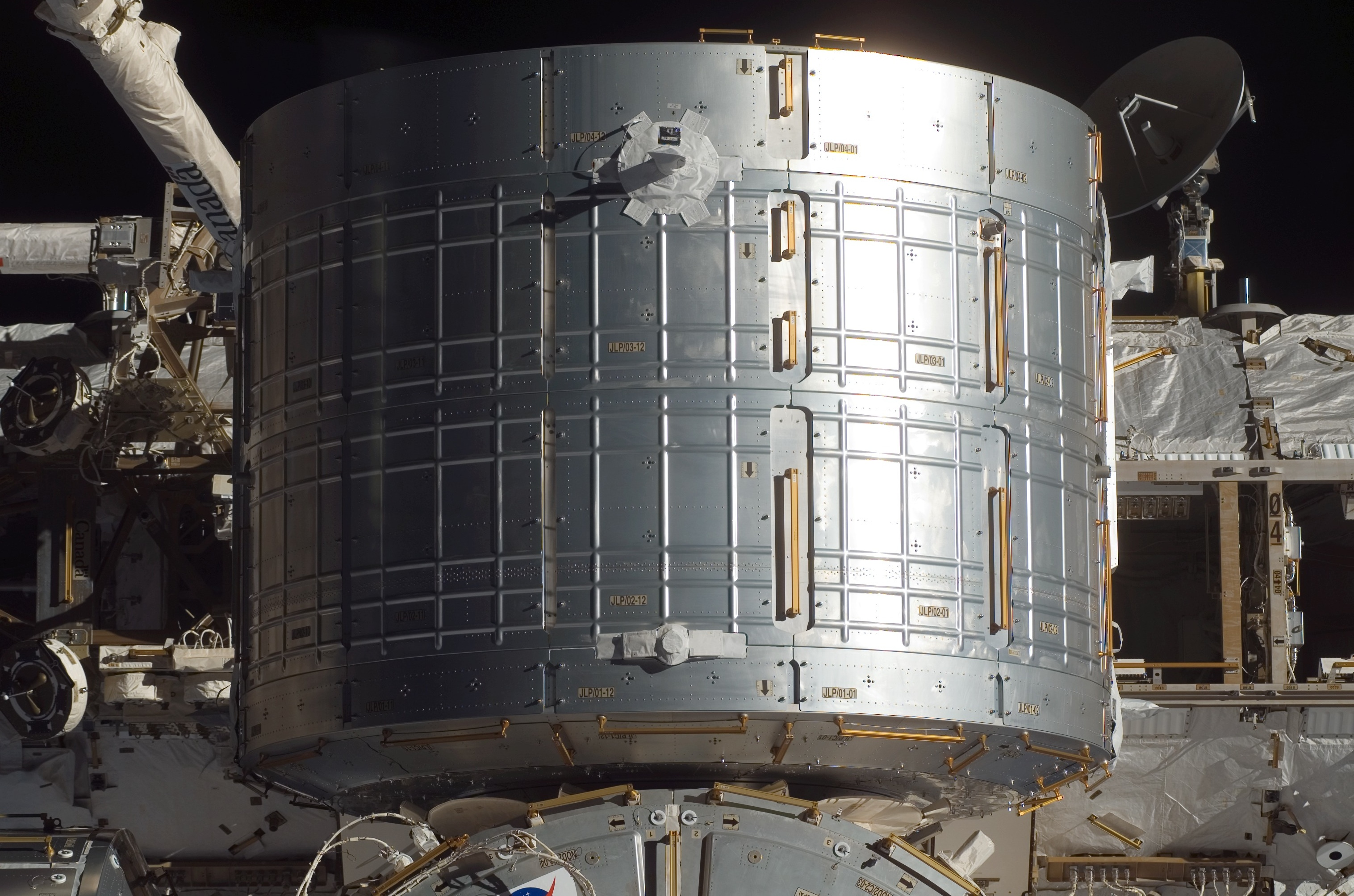
Experiment logistics module, pressurized section

The experiment logistics module (ELM) includes two sections:

- The pressurized section (ELM-PS), also called the JLP (Japanese logistics pressurized), is a pressurized addition to the PM. It is used as a storage facility, providing storage space for experiment payloads, samples and spare items.
- The unpressurized (external) section (ELM-ES) serves as a storage and transportation module. It was used to transfer external experiments with the Space Shuttle. It is not used after the retirement of the shuttle.

=== Remote manipulator system ===
The JEM remote manipulator system (JEMRMS) is a 10 m (33 ft) robotic arm, mounted at the port cone of the PM. It is used for servicing the EF and for moving equipment to and from the ELM. The JEMRMS control console was launched while inside the ELM-PS, and the main arm was launched with the PM. The small fine arm, which is 2 m (6 ft 7 in) long and attaches to the end effector of the main arm, was launched aboard HTV-1 on the maiden flight of the HTV spacecraft. Once HTV had docked, the small fine arm was assembled by the crew and deployed outside the airlock to test it. The JEMRMS grappled the arm and unfolded it to flex the joints before stowing it onto the EF. The free end of the JEMRMS is able to use the same type of grapple fixtures that the Canadarm2 uses.

=== Inter-orbit Communication System ===
Inter-orbit Communication System (ICS) consists of a rack of communication module in the Pressurized Module (ICS-PM) and the antenna module to be attached on the Exposed Facility (ICS-EF). It was used to communicate with the ground station via JAXA's communication technology demonstration satellite DRTS "Kodama". After the decommissioning of DRTS in August 2017, Kibō relies on the ISS's Ku band communication through NASA's TDRSS. ICS-EF was disposed by jettisoning into orbit in February 2020 and reentered on March 17, 2023 over Sacramento, California.

== Launch sequence ==
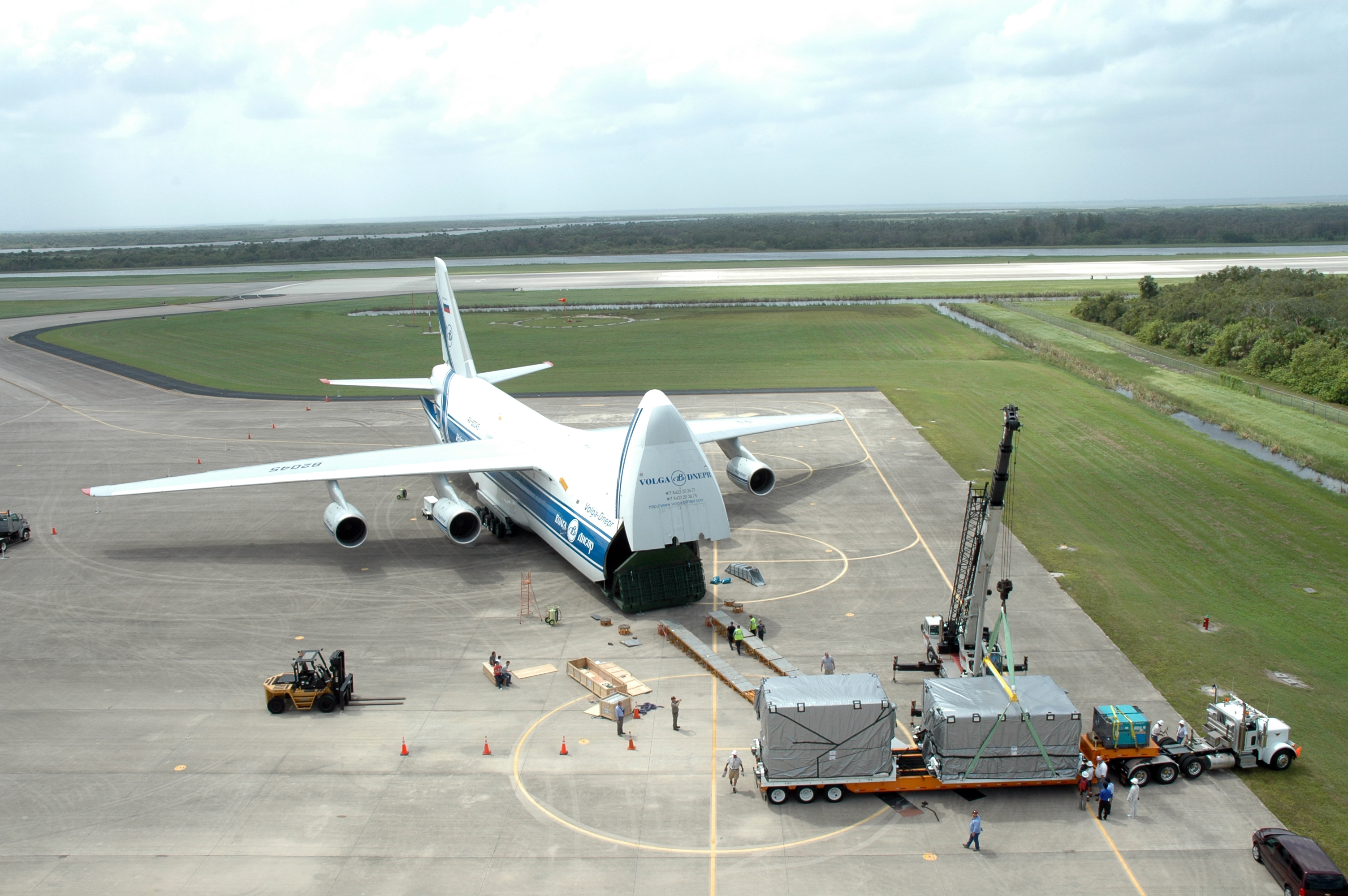
The EF and ELM-ES arriving at
the Kennedy Space Center

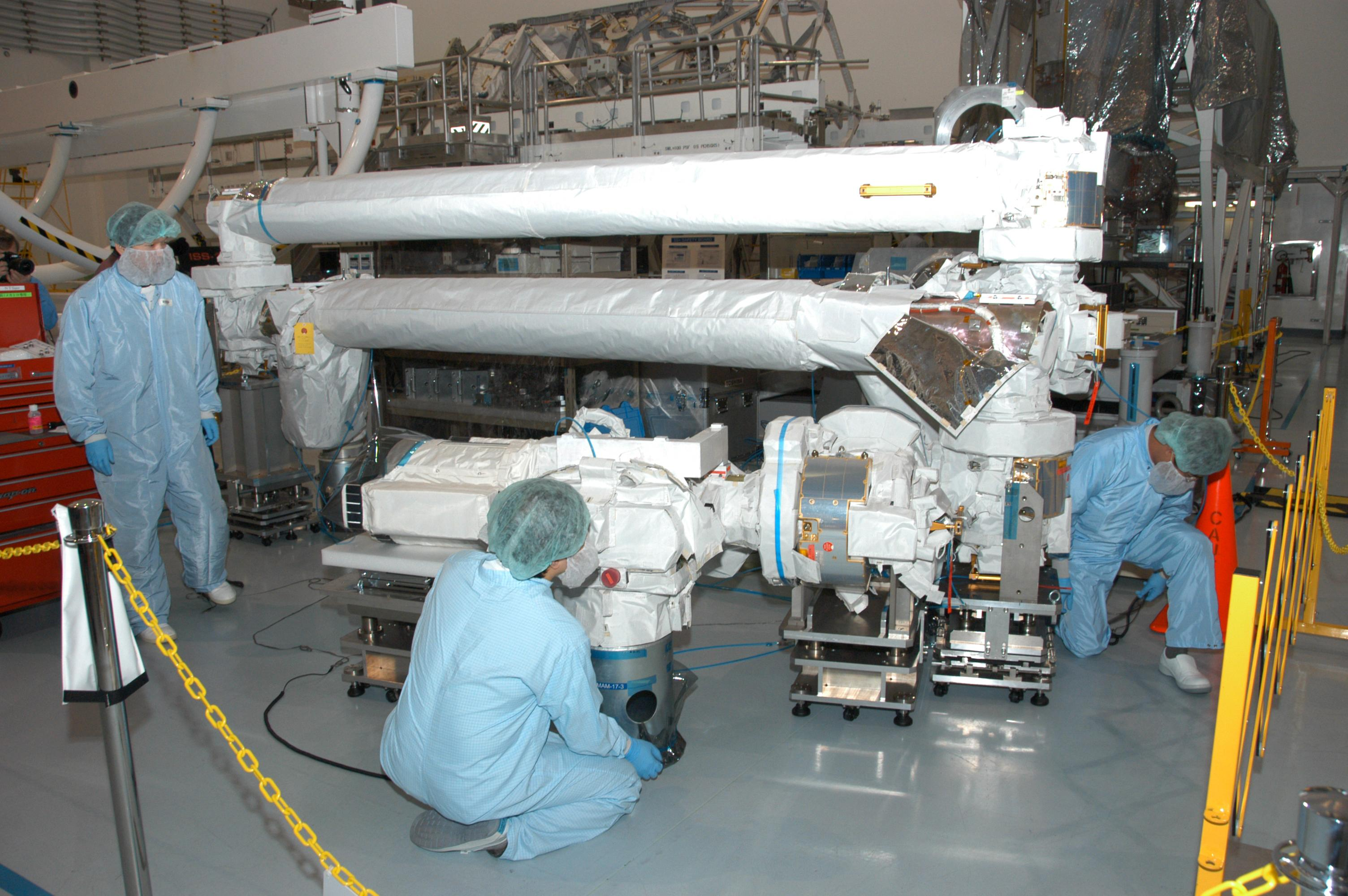
Technicians working on the remote manipulator system at KSC

NASA launched the JEM complex over three flights using the Space Shuttle. The shuttle had a large payload bay which carried the modules into orbit along with the crew. This is in contrast to the Russian modules, which are launched into orbit on multistage Proton rockets and then rendezvous and dock with the station automatically.

On 12 March 2007, the Experiment Logistics Module-Pressurized Section (ELM-PS) arrived at the Kennedy Space Center (KSC) from Japan. It was stored in the Space Station Processing Facility (SSPF) until launched into orbit aboard Endeavour on 11 March 2008 as part of the STS-123 mission.

On 30 May 2003, the Pressurized Module (PM), the main laboratory, arrived at KSC from Japan. It was stored at the SSPF until launched into orbit aboard Discovery on 31 May 2008 as part of the STS-124 mission. On 3 June 2008, the PM was attached to the Harmony module. At first the ELM-PS, the small cargo bay, was connected to a temporary location on Harmony and later, on 6 June 2008, was moved to its final berthing location on top (zenith) of the main laboratory.

The Exposed Facility (EF) and Experiment Logistics Module-External Section (ELM-ES) arrived at KSC on 24 September 2008. The two elements were launched on Endeavour on 15 July 2009 as part of the STS-127 mission. The ELM-ES was brought back to Earth at the end of the mission. The assembly of the EF was completed during the fifth spacewalk of the mission.

== Specifications ==
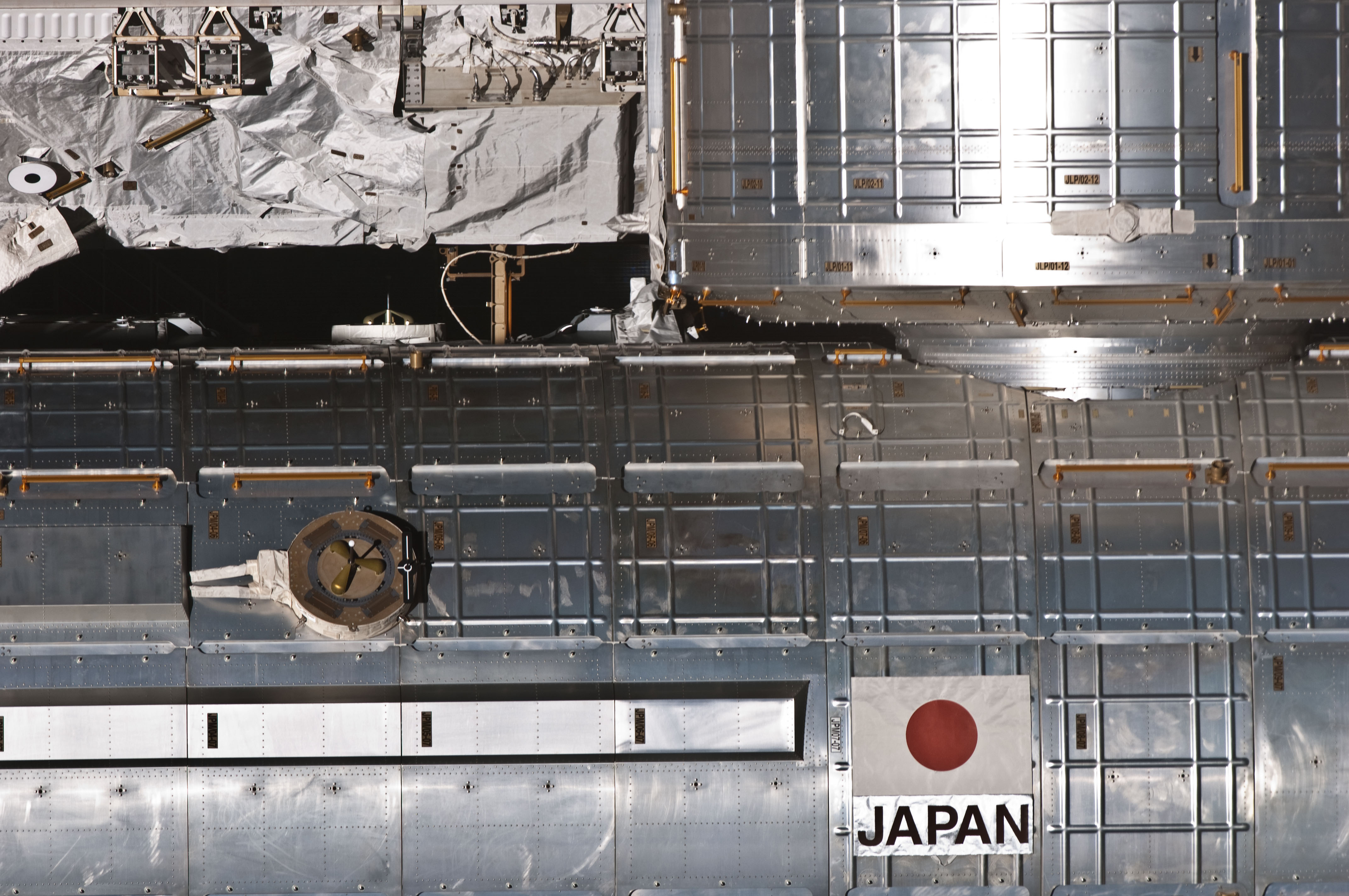
Close view of the exterior panels of the Pressurized Module and Logistics Module, during STS-132

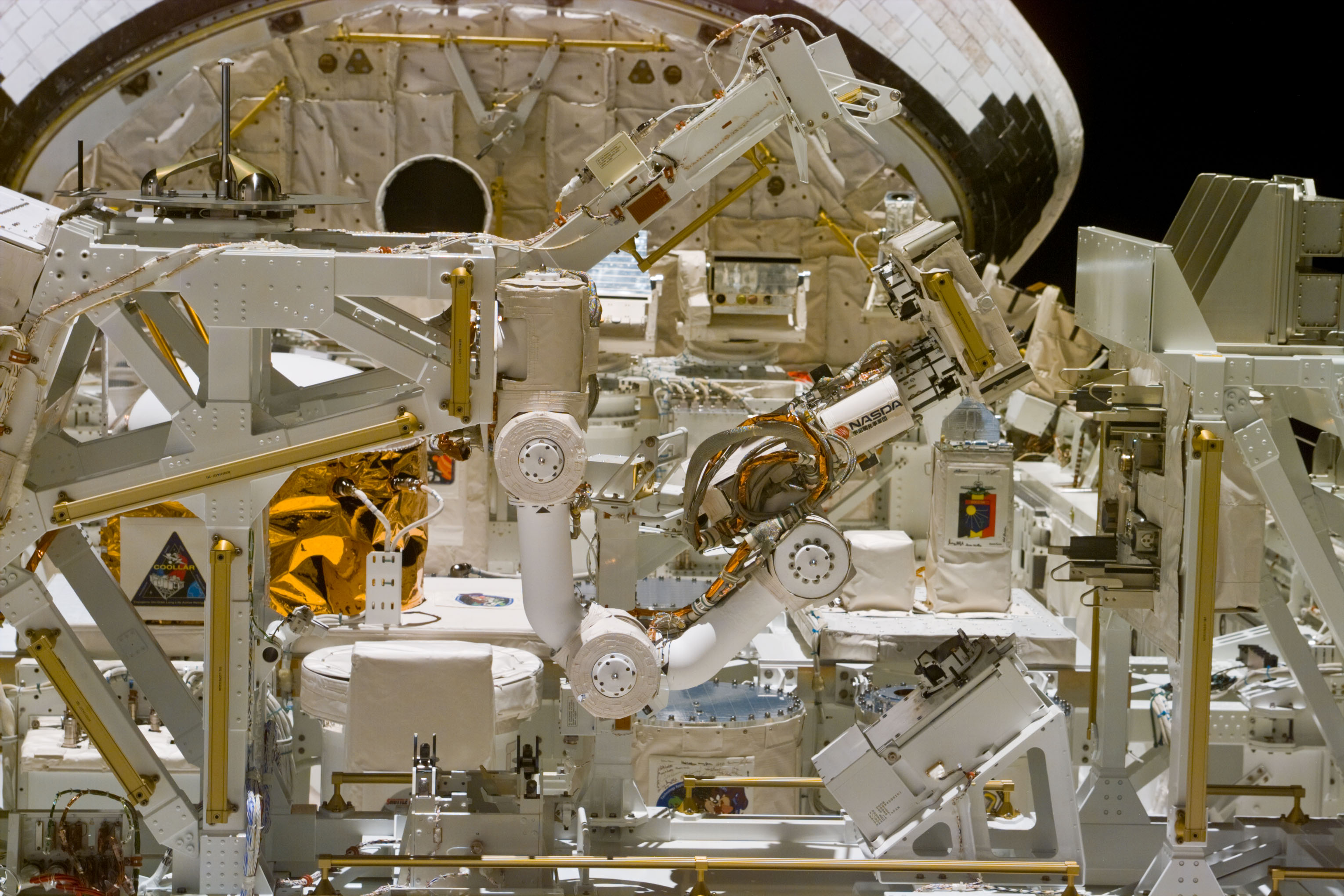
A prototype for the Small Fine Arm was tested during the STS-85 space shuttle mission in 1997.

Kibō is the largest single ISS module:

- Pressurized module
  - Length: 11.19 metres (36.7 ft)
  - Diameter: 4.39 metres (14.4 ft)
  - Mass: 15,900 kilograms (35,100 lb)
  - Launch Date: 31 May 2008
- Experiment logistics module - Pressurized Section
  - Length: 4.21 metres (13.8 ft)
  - Diameter: 4.39 metres (14.4 ft)
  - Mass: 8,386 kilograms (18,488 lb)
  - Launch Date: 11 March 2008

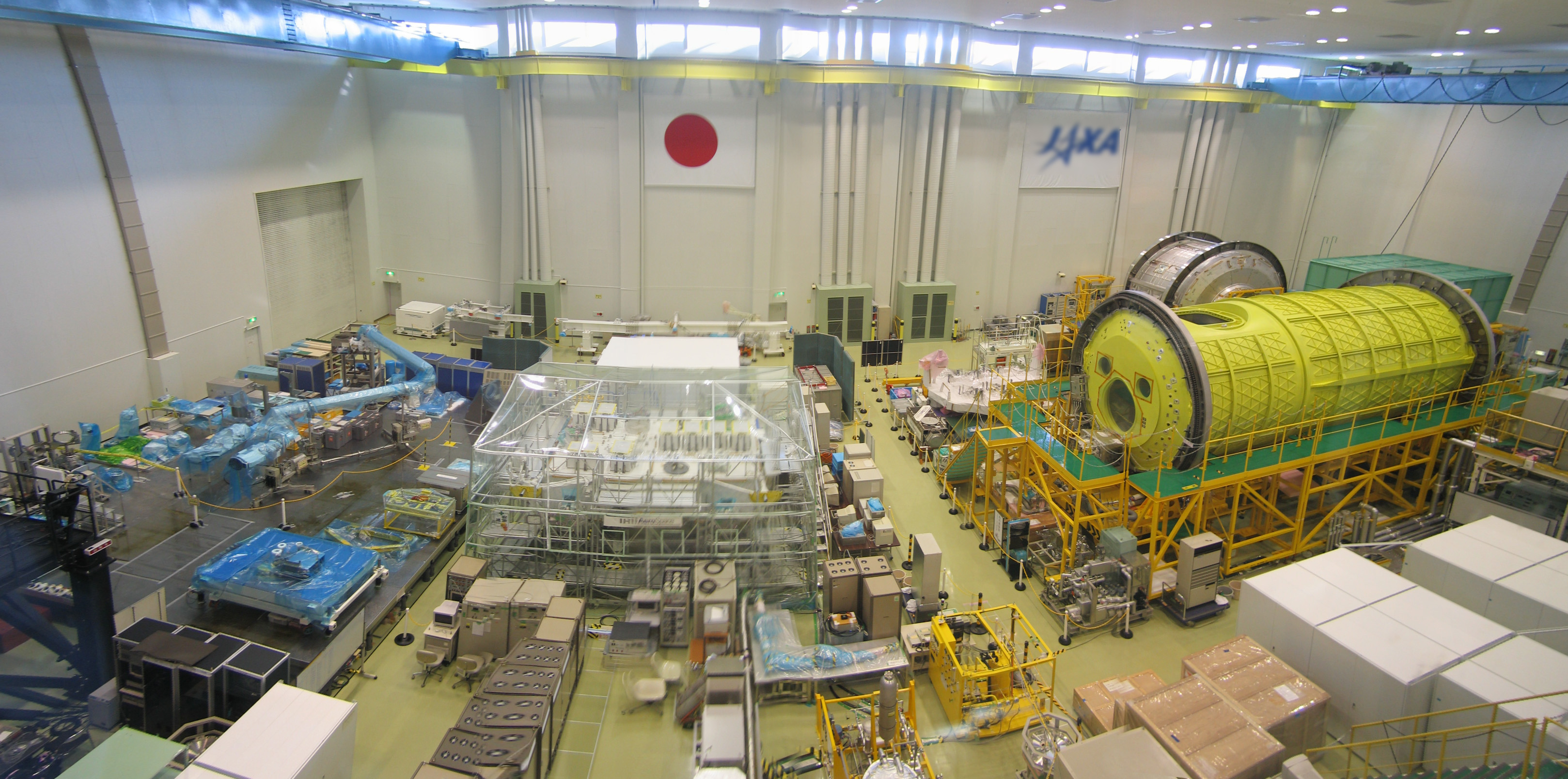
The JEM being manufactured

- Exposed Facility
  - Length: 4 metres (13 ft)
  - Diameter: 5.6 metres (18 ft)
  - Height: 5 metres (16 ft)
  - Mass: 4,000.685 kilograms (8,820.00 lb)
  - Launch Date: 15 July 2009
- Robotic Arm
  - Main Arm (MA)
    - Length: 10 metres (33 ft)
    - Mass: 780 kilograms (1,720 lb)
    - Handling Capacity: Max. 7000 kg (Payload size: 1.85m x 1.0m x 0.8m / weight: less than 500 kg)
  - Small Fine Arm (SFA)
    - Length: 2.2 metres (7 ft 3 in)
    - Mass: 190 kilograms (420 lb)
    - Handling Capacity: Max. 80kg with Compliance Control Mode, Max. 300kg without Compliance Control Mode(ORU size: 0.62 x 0.42 x 0.41m / weight: 80kg max)

The module and all its integrated accessories were manufactured at the Tsukuba Space Center in Japan. It is made from stainless steel, titanium, and aluminum.

== Experiments on Kibō ==
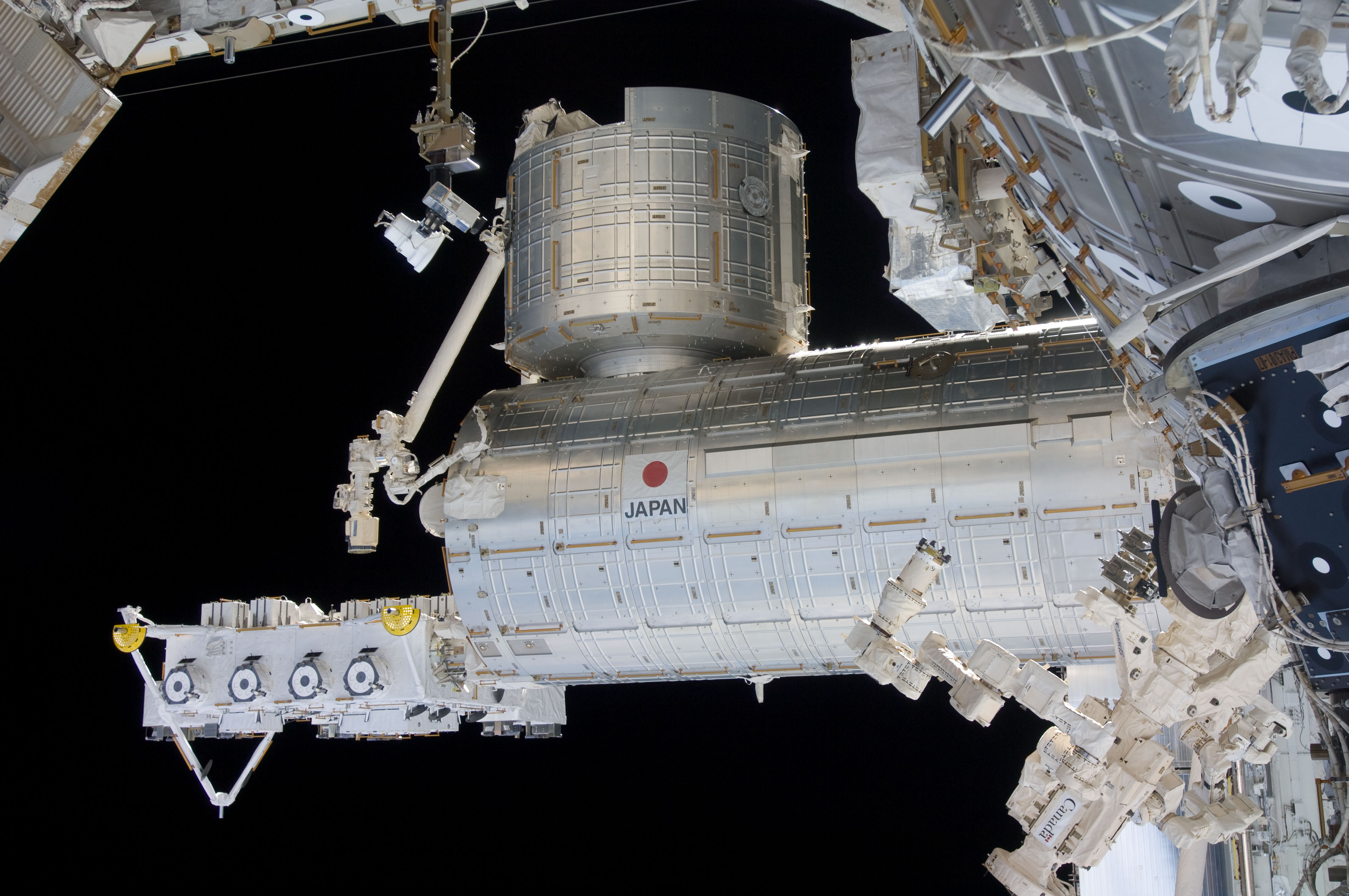
Looking forward at Kibō

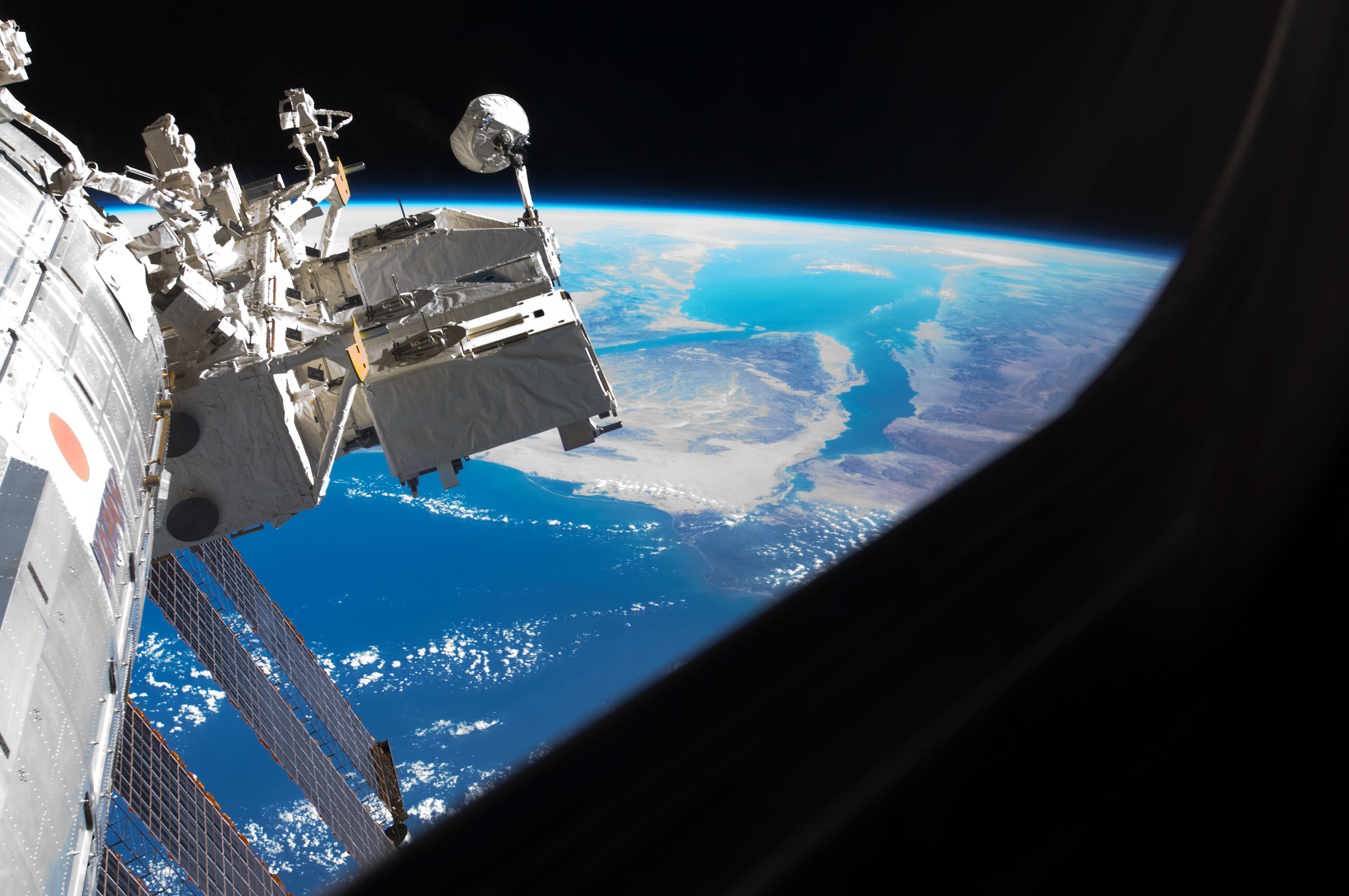
Looking alongside

=== Current external experiments ===
- MAXI – X-ray astronomy from 0.5 to 30 keV. Exposed Facility Slot 1.
- STP-H9-SWELL (Space Wireless Energy Laser Link), A test payload for Laser Communications a follow on to OPALS,Electric Propulsion Electrostatic Analyzer, A test device that will demonstrate re-boost using Ion Propulsion, Neutron Radiation Detection Instrument from NRL, Variable Voltage Ion Protection Experiment from NRL, ECLIPSE (Experiment for Characterizing the Lower Ionosphere and Production of Sporadic-E), Glowbug, cosmic ray detector built in conjunction with NASA, an experiment that will study cosmic rays for two years, SpaceCube Edge Node Intelligent Collaboration, an experiment built by NASA Goddard that will study microchips and artificial intelligence exposed to the vacuum of space, and SOHIP, a hyperspectral imager built by Livermore Labs that will study the atmosphere for two years. Exposed Facility Slot 7 port originally held HREP and GEDI which was relocated to Slot 6 and placed in hibernation. Moved to Slot 2 in September 2025.
- OCO-3 – Monitoring of carbon dioxide in the Earth's atmosphere using a flight spare from OCO-2. Relocated back to Slot 3 and placed in hibernation.
- NREP – Nanoracks External Platform, at Slot 4.
- i-SEEP – IVA-replaceable Small Exposed Experiment Platform (JAXA). Mounted to Exposed Facility Slot 5. It is a platform to support small-to-medium (less than 200 kg) payloads. Experiments on the i-SEEP platform are HDTV-EF2 (since 2017), GPSR/Wheel, SOLISS (since 2019 removed in 2023 and stowed), and SeCRETS .
- GEDI – Global Ecosystem Dynamics Investigation on ISS. Exposed Facility Slot 6 in hibernation until STP-H8 is removed and MOLI is installed. Port originally held ICS-EF and temporarily held CREAM until it was relocated to Slot 13 on the roof of the Logistics Module and placed in hibernation.
- STP Houston 8 Payload-COWVR and TEMPEST Launched on SpaceX CRS-24 in 2021. Exposed Facility Slot 2 port originally held CREAM which was moved to Slot 13 on the roof and stowed in hibernation. Moved to Slot 7 in September 2025.
- HISUI – Hyperspectral Imager Suite (METI) replacement for HREP which ended its mission in 2017. Exposed Facility Slot 8 port originally held MCE.
- CALET – CALorimetric Electron Telescope (JAXA), observation for high energy cosmic rays. Launched aboard Kounotori 5 (HTV-5). Mass: 2500 kg. Exposed Facility Slot 9 port originally held SEDA-AP.
- ECOSTRESS – Ecosystem Spaceborne Thermal Radiometer Experiment on Space Station. Exposed Facility Slot 10 port originally held the ELM-ES and the HTV Transfer Pallet.
- i-SEEP2 - IVA-replaceable Small Exposed Experiment Platform 2 Exposed Facility Slot 11.
- i-SEEP3B at Slot 12.
- CREAM – Cosmic Ray Energetics and Mass Experiment. Launched on SpaceX CRS-12 in 2017. Initially at Exposed Facility Slot 2. Moved to Slot 7 in 2021 and back to Slot 2 in 2023 to make room for STP Houston 9. Logistics Module Slot 13 in hibernation until STP-H9 is removed then it will go back to Slot 2.
- ExHAM 1 and 2 – External Facility Handrail Attach Mechanism (JAXA). Mounted to the deck on handrails in the forward and aft locations next to slots 7 and 10.

=== Former external experiments ===
Deorbited with Kounotori 5 (HTV-5):

- SMILES – Observes and monitors very weak sub-millimeter wave emission lines of trace gas molecules in the stratosphere.
- MCE – Multi-mission Consolidated Equipment (NASA).

Deorbited with SpaceX CRS-15:

- HREP – Hyperspectral Imager for the Coastal Ocean (HICO) and Remote Atmospheric and Ionospheric Detection System (RAIDS) experimental payload.

Deorbited with SpaceX CRS-17:

- CATS – Cloud-Aerosol Transport System (LiDAR, NASA). Originally held in Slot 5, will be replaced by MOLI.

Jettisoned into orbit by ISS robotic arm:

- SEDA-AP – Space Environment Data Acquisition equipment-Attached Payload. Measures neutrons, plasma, heavy ions, and high-energy light particles in the station's orbit.
- ICS-EF – Inter-orbit Communication System-Exposed Facility, Japanese communication system. Originally at the Exposed Facility Slot 7.
- ILLUMA-T – Laser communication payload. Originally at Exposed Facility Slot 3 port originally held SMILES and OCO 3.

=== Current internal experiments ===
Japanese:

- RYUTAI Rack 流体 (りゅうたい, ryūtai; fluid) – Fluid Physics Experiment Facility (FPEF), Solution Crystallization Observation Facility (SCOF), Protein Crystallization Research Facility (PCRF), Image Processing Unit (IPU)
- SAIBO Rack 細胞 (さいぼう, saibō; cell) – Cell Biology Experiment Facility (CBEF), Clean Bench (CB)
- KOBAIRO Rack 勾配炉 (こうばいろ, kōbairo) – Gradient Heating Furnace (GHF)
- MPSR-1 – Multi-Purpose Small payload Rack-1
- MPSR-2 – Multi-Purpose Small payload Rack-2, housing Electrostatic Levitating Furnace (ELF)

American:

- EXPRESS Rack 4 – Biotechnology Specimen Temperature Controller (BSTC), Gas Supply Module (GSM), Space Acceleration Measurement System-II (SAMS-II), Biotechnology Specimen Temperature Controller (BSTC), Nanoracks NanoLab
- EXPRESS Rack 5
- MELFI-1 – two −80° freezer racks
- Life Sciences Glovebox (LSG)
- Mochii – Spectroscopic Scanning Electron Microscope (SEM) National Laboratory Facility

=== Planned experiments ===
- MOLI – Multi-footprint Observation Lidar and Imager (JAXA) (external)
- JEM-EUSO (internal)

== Parts ==
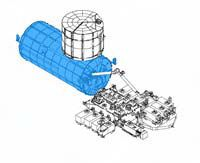
Pressurized Module

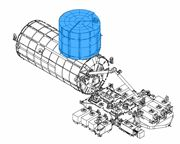
Experiment Logistics Module-Pressurized Section

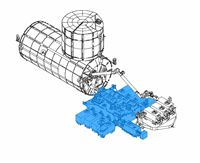
Exposed Facility

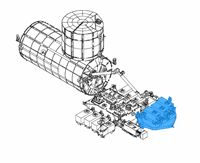
Experiment Logistics Module-Exposed Section

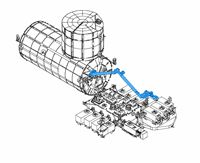
Remote Manipulator System

== See also ==
- Scientific research on the ISS
- Japan Manned Space Systems Corporation
- Japanese Space Station Module (Mitsui)
- Nanoracks CubeSat Deployer (NRCSD)
