= GASPACS =

CubeSat mission

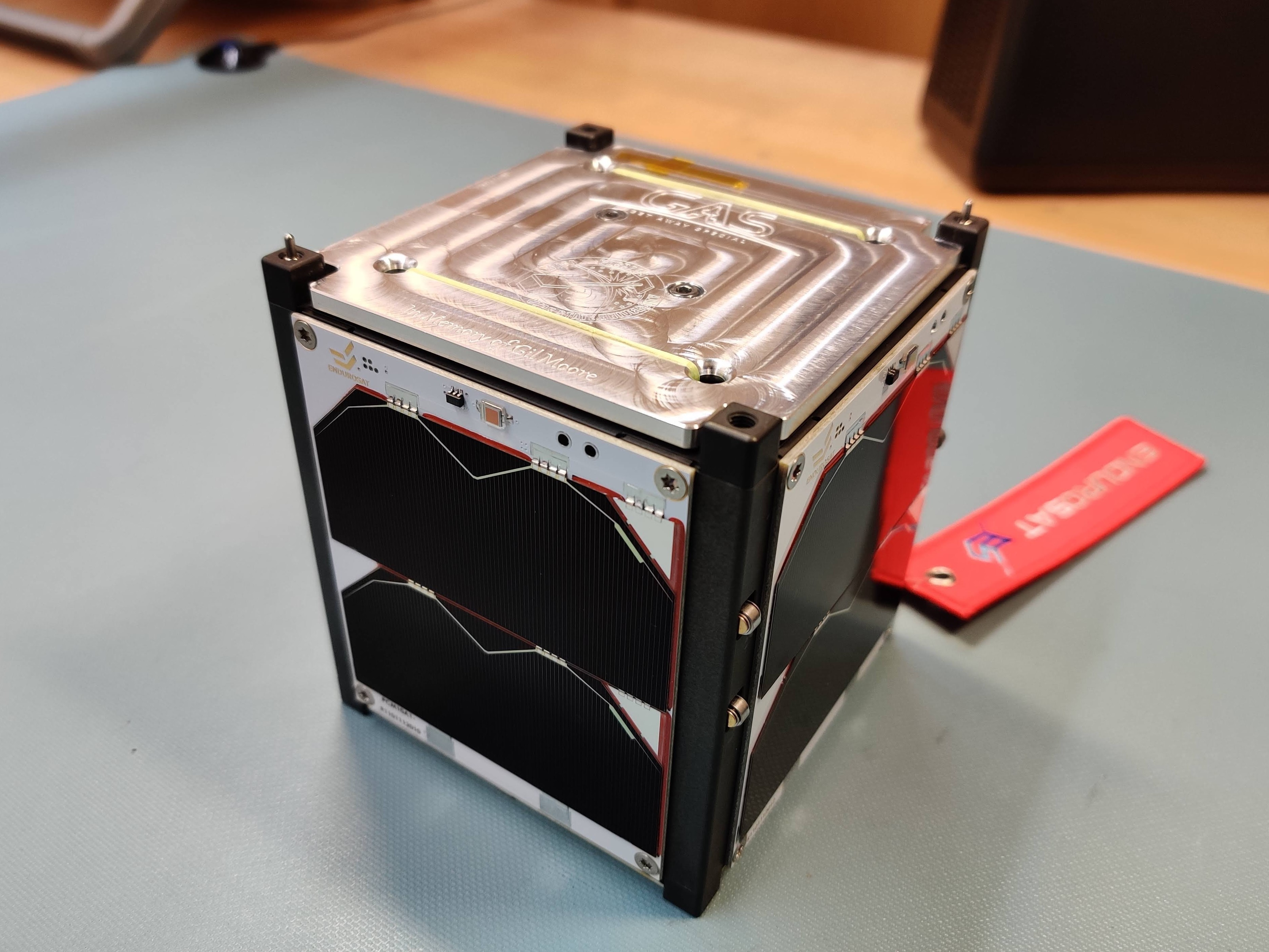
- The completed GASPACS CubeSat
- Mission type: Technology demonstration
- Operator: Utah State University Get Away Special Team
- COSPAR ID: 1998-067TB
- SATCAT no.: 51439
- Website: https://www.usu.edu/physics/gas/projects/gaspacs
- Mission duration: 4 months

Spacecraft properties
- Spacecraft type: 1U CubeSat
- Launch mass: 1.17 kilograms (2.6 lb)

Start of mission
- Launch date: December 21, 2021, 10:07 UTC
- Rocket: Falcon 9 B1069.1, Cargo Dragon C209-2
- Launch site: Kennedy Space Center Launch Complex 39A
- Contractor: NASA
- Deployed from: International Space Station
- Deployment date: January 26, 2022, 12:00 UTC

End of mission
- Last contact: May 21, 2022, 17:23 UTC
- Decay date: May 22, 2022

Orbital parameters
- Reference system: Geocentric orbit
- Regime: Low Earth orbit
- Periapsis altitude: 416 kilometres (258 mi)
- Apoapsis altitude: 428 kilometres (266 mi)
- Inclination: 51.6 degrees
- Period: 90.5 minutes

Payload
- Experimental AeroBoom

Transponders
- Frequency: 437.365 MHz

GASPACS (Get Away Special Passive Attitude Control Satellite) was a NASA sponsored 1U CubeSat developed entirely by undergraduate members of Utah State University's Get Away Special (GAS) team. The primary mission objective of GASPACS was to deploy a 1-meter inflatable aerodynamic boom to passively stabilize its attitude. GASPACS was the world's first CubeSat to be developed entirely by undergraduate students, and was also the world's first CubeSat to utilize a Raspberry Pi Zero as its flight computer.

== Overview ==
GASPACS was a 1U CubeSat, meaning it measured 10 centimeters by 10 centimeters by 10 centimeters (3.9 in). GASPACS's primary mission objective was to deploy and photograph a 1-meter (39 inches) inflatable aerodynamic boom. This custom first of its kind "AeroBoom" was designed by the undergraduate members of the USU GAS team. The AeroBoom was designed as an alternative to Gravity-gradient stabilization for spacecraft using passive attitude control in Low Earth orbit, or other active forms of attitude control such as magnetorquers or reaction wheels. The AeroBoom worked similarly to the feathers on an arrow. Molecules of air in the Earth's upper atmosphere struck the AeroBoom (drag force), causing a stabilizing torque. The secondary objective of GASPACS was to measure and analyze attitude behavior to verify the AeroBoom was providing passive attitude control.

GASPACS was selected and sponsored by NASA through the CubeSat Launch Initiative program in 2014. The CSLI contract provided launch services for GASPACS.

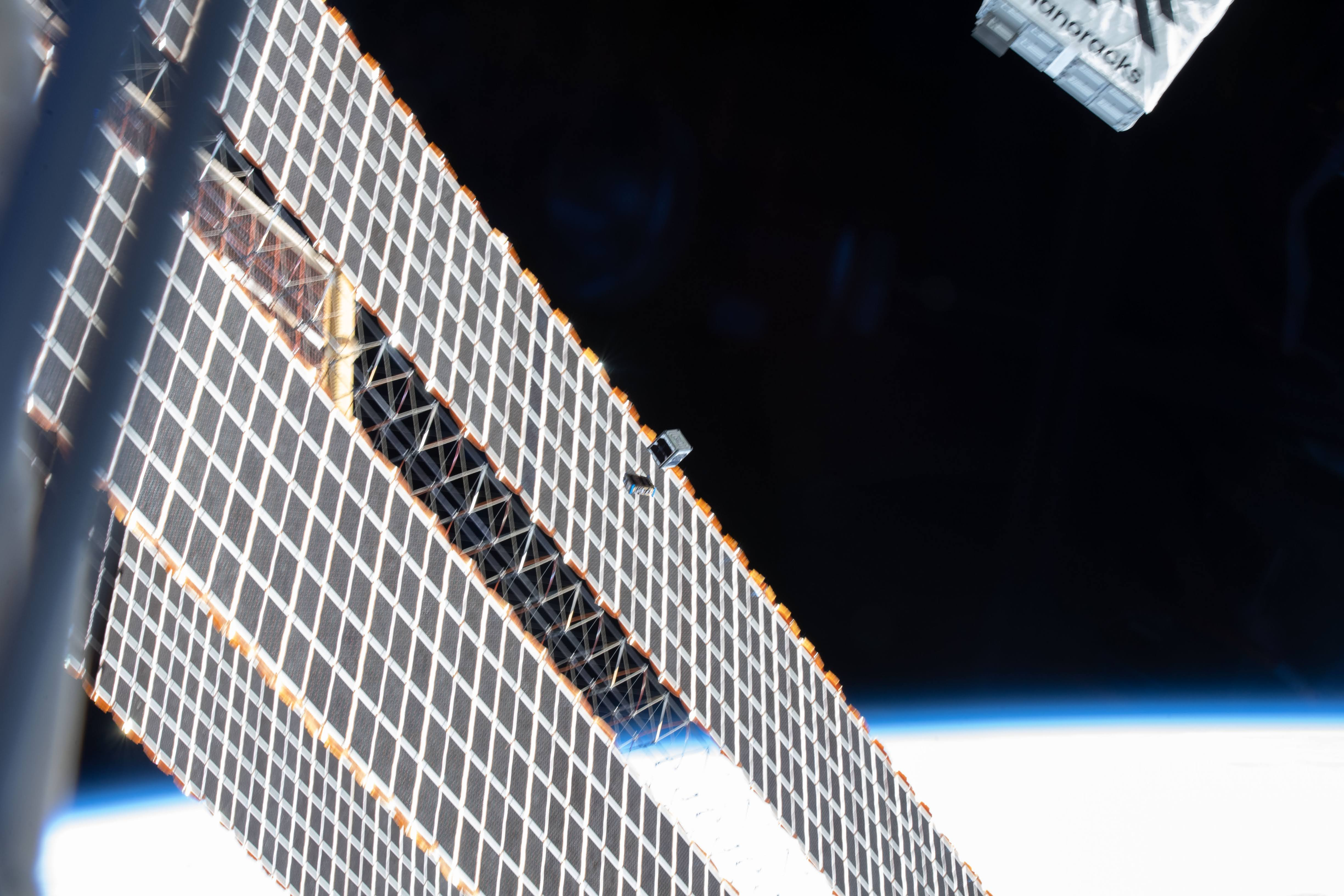
GASPACS moments after deployment from the International Space Station

GASPACS was delivered to Nanoracks on September 23, 2021. On December 21, 2021, GASPACS was launched to the International Space Station aboard SpaceX CRS-24, as part of NASA mission ELaNa 38. One month later, on January 26, 2022, GASPACS was deployed from the ISS via a Nanoracks CubeSat Deployer by U.S. astronauts Raja Chari and Thomas Marshburn.

NASA requires all CubeSats deployed from the ISS to wait a minimum of 30 minutes after deployment to begin booting up and starting their mission. After this required lapse of time, GASPACS autonomously booted up and deployed its antennas. 47 minutes after deployment a ground station in Tokyo, Japan recorded the first successful observation of GASPACS's beacons. These beacons included an AX.25 identifier, as well as an audio beacon. The audio beacon consisted of the satellite's N7GAS callsign in Morse code, followed by a digitalized rendition of "The Scotsman'', USU's spirit song.

18 hours after deployment from the ISS, GASPACS passed over the mission control ground station located on USU's campus and transmitted a photograph of the satellite's inflated boom, confirming primary mission success. In the weeks following deployment, several sections of attitude data from the onboard accelerometer were downlinked, confirming the effectiveness of the AeroBoom mechanism.

== GASPACS construction ==
GASPACS was constructed utilizing the following components:

=== Raspberry Pi Zero W ===
GASPACS was the world's first CubeSat to use a Raspberry Pi as its flight computer. The Pi was responsible for running all onboard computing, running the Python scripts developed by the team. A secondary mission of the satellite was to test the viability of cheap commercial microcontrollers such as the Raspberry Pi.

=== Raspberry Pi Camera Module 2 ===
The Pi Camera was used to confirm successful deployment of the AeroBoom. 18 hours after deployment, GASPACS transmitted the first photograph taken by the camera, confirming the successful deployment of the boom. GASPACS has taken several additional photographs, many including Earth in the background.

=== Custom Interface Board ===
The USU GAS team designed their own custom printed circuit board. This 3 level PCB held all of the major electrical components. Sensors include an accelerometer, magnetometer, and a UV sensor. The PCB also included a DF Robot Beetle. This Beetle acted as a watchdog to ensure the Raspberry Pi functioned properly. The Beetle monitored the Pi at 0.25 Hz to detect malfunctions due to radiation. In the case of a malfunction, the Beetle automatically turned the Pi off, and then back on. This process was designed to revert any upsets due to radiation back to normal. Another component included on the interface board was a custom burn wire mechanism used to deploy the AeroBoom.

=== EnduroSat components ===
GASPACS incorporated many EnduroSat components in its bus. The EnduroSat electrical power system included a battery, and was charged by solar panels, which included Sun sensors and temperature sensors. GASPACS also contained an EnduroSat transceiver and antenna for communications, and their 1U structure.

=== AeroBoom payload ===
GASPACS's payload was the AeroBoom. The AeroBoom consisted of a layer of Polyvinylidene fluoride plastic, pressurized with 2.2 psia of air. This tube was encased in a sleeve of braided fiberglass. The outermost layer of the AeroBoom was a final sleeve of Fluorinated ethylene propylene plastic. The air inside the AeroBoom pressurized upon reaching the vacuum of space, and was held inside of a custom designed AeroBoom box by fishing line until AeroBoom deployment. To deploy its AeroBoom, GASPACS ran a current through its Nichrome burn wire circuit. The Nichrome heated up, burning through the fishing line, releasing the AeroBoom.

== Mission status ==
The North American Aerospace Defense Command designated GASPACS as NORAD ID 51439.

Three days after deployment, on January 29, 2022, GASPACS faced a major setback when power was lost on the Y-channel. This caused a significant reduction in the available power. GASPACS entered a perpetual charge cycle, charging up for approximately six hours on its remaining solar panels before reaching the power required to turn back on. Once booted up, GASPACS would stay powered on for approximately an hour before shutting off due to low power, and repeating the cycle. This continuous power cycle greatly reduced the quantity of data GASPACS was able to transmit to Earth.

On May 6, 2022, loss of the Z-channel was confirmed. This once again drastically reduced GASPACS's available power. Despite this, GASPACS continued to power on when possible, and ground operators were able to receive several packets of telemetry data, photo data, and AX.25 beacons.

The satellite decayed from orbit on 22 May 2022.
