= SpaceX CRS-24 =

2021 American resupply spaceflight to the ISS

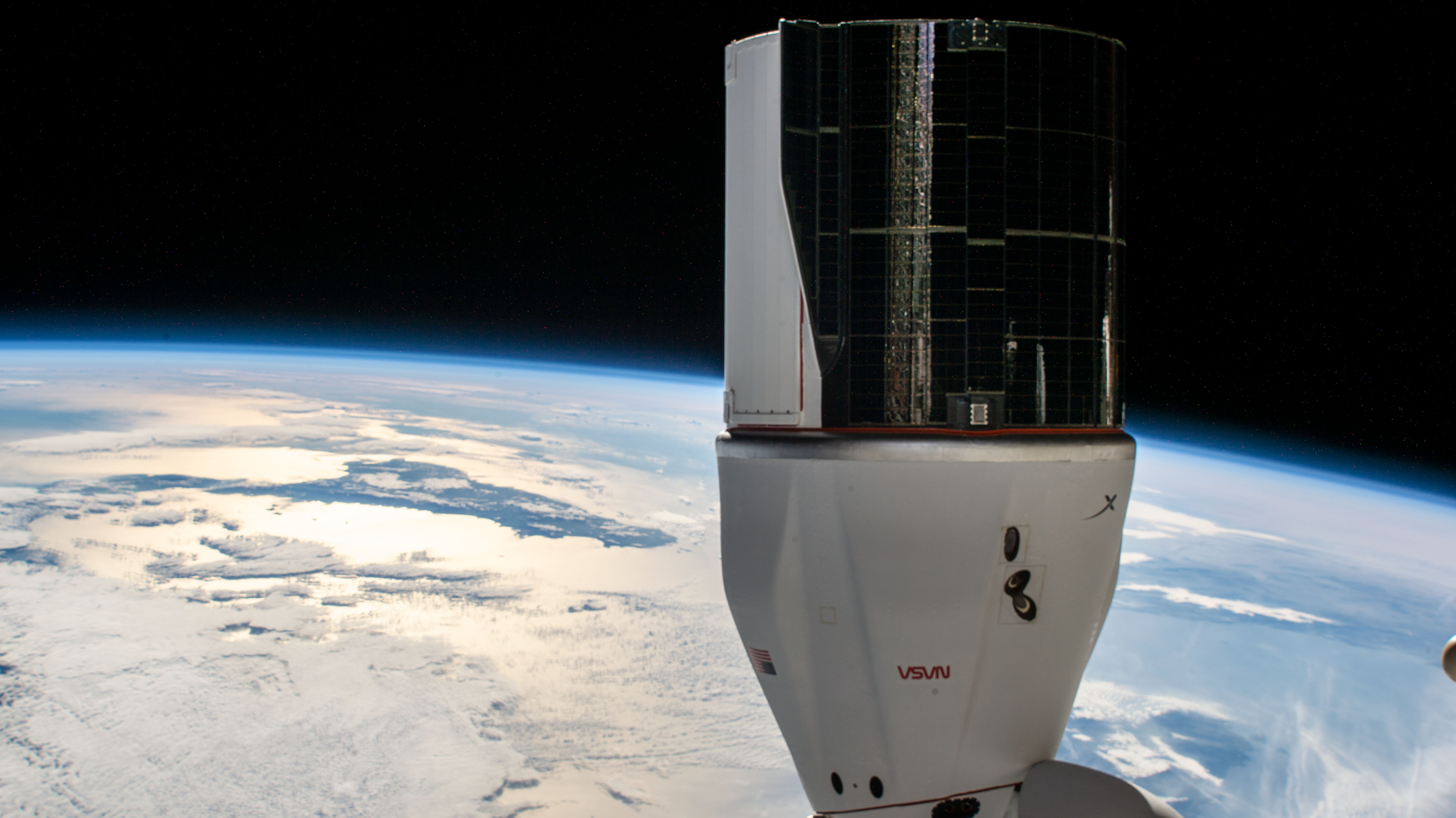
- CRS-24 mission docked to ISS
- Names: SpX-24
- Mission type: ISS resupply
- Operator: SpaceX
- COSPAR ID: 2021-127A
- SATCAT no.: 50318
- Mission duration: 34 days, 10 hours, 57 minutes

Spacecraft properties
- Spacecraft: Cargo Dragon C209
- Spacecraft type: Cargo Dragon
- Manufacturer: SpaceX
- Launch mass: 6,000 kg (13,000 lb)
- Payload mass: 2,989 kg (6,590 lb)
- Dimensions: 8.1 m (27 ft) (height); 4 m (13 ft) (diameter)

Start of mission
- Launch date: 21 December 2021, 10:07:08 UTC
- Rocket: Falcon 9 Block 5 B1069-1
- Launch site: Kennedy Space Center, LC-39A

End of mission
- Recovered by: MV GO Searcher
- Landing date: 24 January 2022, 21:05 UTC
- Landing site: Gulf of Mexico

Orbital parameters
- Reference system: Geocentric orbit
- Regime: Low Earth orbit
- Inclination: 51.66°

Docking with International Space Station
- Docking port: Harmony zenith
- Docking date: 22 December 2021, 08:41 UTC
- Undocking date: 23 January 2022, 15:40 UTC
- Time docked: 32 days, 6 hours, 59 minutes (achieved)

Cargo
- Mass: 2,989 kg (6,590 lb)
- Pressurised: 2,081 kg (4,588 lb)
- Unpressurised: 908 kg (2,002 lb)
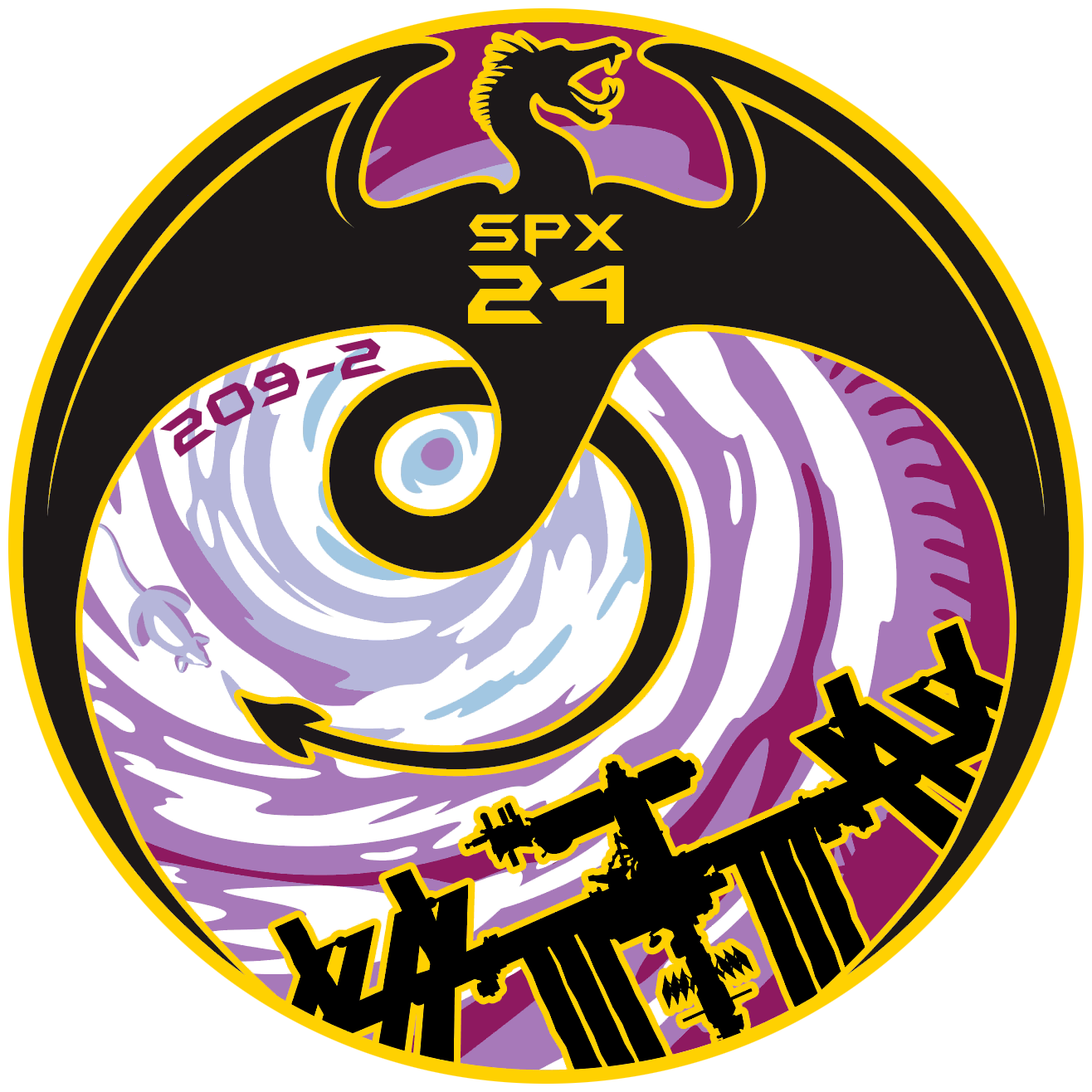
- SpaceX CRS-24 mission patch Commercial Resupply Services Cargo Dragon flights

SpaceX CRS-24, also known as SpX-24, was a Commercial Resupply Service mission to the International Space Station launched on 21 December 2021, at 10:07:08 UTC. The mission is contracted by NASA and is flown by SpaceX using a Cargo Dragon. This is the fourth flight for SpaceX under NASA's CRS Phase 2 contract awarded in January 2016.

== Cargo Dragon ==
SpaceX plans to reuse the Cargo Dragons up to five times. The Cargo Dragon is launched without SuperDraco abort engines, without seats, cockpit controls and the life support system required to sustain astronauts in space. The new Cargo Dragon capsules under the NASA CRS Phase 2 contract will land east of Florida in the Atlantic Ocean.

== Payload ==
NASA contracted for the CRS-24 mission from SpaceX and therefore determines the primary payload, date of launch, and orbital parameters for the Cargo Dragon C209. (This effectively determined C209'a turnaround time, which broke the shortness record for reusable orbital spacecraft, at 164.3 days.) Two educational microcontrollers (Astro Pi and Calliope mini) are also being delivered as part of the payload of this mission.

SpaceX CRS-24 carries over 2,989 kg (6,590 lb) of science experiments, instruments, supplies, hardware, and Christmas presents up to the ISS and the crew of Expedition 66.

- Crew supplies: 386 kg (851 lb)
- Science investigations: 1,119 kg (2,467 lb)
- Spacewalk equipment: 182 kg (401 lb)
- Vehicle hardware: 328 kg (723 lb)
- Computer resources: 33 kg (73 lb)

=== ANITA-2 ===
ANITA-2 is a trace gas monitoring system developed by OHB and SINTEF under contract of ESA.

=== STP-H7 ===
A technology demonstration mission which consists of the following payloads:

- CASPR (Configurable Autonomous Sensor Processing Research), including a 8U binocular camera iSIM-90 optics mounted atop a gimbal-actuated platform.
- GARI-1 (GAGG Radiation Instrument)
- Falcon Neuro
- LASSO (Local Area Space Surveillance Observations)
- OSVW (Ocean Surface Vector Winds)
- PIANO (Phenomenology Imager and Nighttime Observer)

=== STP-H8 ===
A technology demonstration mission which consists of the microwave radiometers COWVR and TEMPEST.

== Research experiments ==
The following research experiments were flown on SpaceX CRS-24:

- BioPrint FirstAid - Bioprinting uses viable cells and biological molecules to print tissue structures.
- CASIS PCG 20 - Improving delivery of cancer drugs monoclonal antibodies, used to treat a wide range of human diseases, do not dissolve easily in liquid and so typically must be given intravenously in a clinic setting. CASIS PCG 20 continues work on crystallizing a monoclonal antibody developed by Merck Research Laboratories, pembrolizumab. It is the active ingredient in Keytruda®, a drug that targets multiple cancers. Scientists analyze these crystals to learn more about the structure and behavior of the component to create drug formulations that can be administered at a doctor's office or even at home.
- Host-Pathogen - Scientists have observed that spaceflight sometimes increases the virulence of potentially harmful microbes and reduces human immune function, increasing the risk for infectious disease. Results could help assess the potential risk infectious microbes may pose and may support countermeasures' development. This could improve care for those with compromised immune systems on Earth.
- Multi-Variable Platform (MVP) Plant-01 - Multi Variable Platform (MVP) Plant-01 profiles and monitors the development of the shoots and roots of plants in microgravity. Plants could serve as a vital part of human life support systems for long-duration spaceflight and habitation of the Moon and Mars. But spacegrown plants experience stress from various factors, and recent studies indicate changes in plant gene expression in response to those stressors. Improved understanding of these changes could enable the design of plants that are better suited for growth in spaceflight environments.
- Procter & Gamble (P&G) Telescience Investigation of Detergent Experiments (PGTIDE) - Astronauts on the Space Station wear an item of clothing several times, then replace it with new clothes delivered on resupply missions. Limited cargo capacity makes this a challenge, and resupply is not an option for longer missions such as to the Moon and Mars. In a collaboration with NASA, Procter & Gamble has developed Tide Infinity, a fully degradable detergent specifically for use in space. Once proven in space, Tide plans to use the new cleaning methods and detergent to advance sustainable, low-resource-use laundry solutions on Earth.
- Turbine Superalloy Casting Module (SCM) - Turbine Superalloy Casting Module (SCM) tests a commercial manufacturing device that processes heat-resistant alloy parts in microgravity. Alloys are materials made up of at least two different chemical elements, one of which is a metal.
- Student Payload Opportunity with Citizen Science (SPOCS) - Students enrolled in institutions of higher learning can design and build microgravity experiments as part of NASA's Student Payload Opportunity with Citizen Science (SPOCS). As part of their experiment, selected teams involve students in grades K through 12 as citizen scientists. Citizen science allows individuals who are not professional scientists to contribute to real-world research. The NASA STEM on Station project is funding experiments flying on this SpaceX resupply mission, including a study on antibiotic resistance in microgravity from Columbia University and one on how microgravity affects bacteria-resistant polymers from the University of Idaho.

European Space Agency (ESA) research and activities:

- ESA's Cytoskeleton experiment, a biological study, aimed at determining the changing function of RhoGTPases when in vitro cell cultures are exposed to weightlessness. The Cytoskeleton experiment will learn about the events that are happening inside a mammalian cell when exposed to weightlessness.[]

Rodent Research-18 Astronauts can experience eye problems after returning from space, along with headaches and blurred vision. Rodent Research-18 investigates how spaceflight affects visual function, examining changes in the vascular system of the retina and the ways specific cells interact. A better understanding of the process and biological mechanisms behind these effects could support development of more effective countermeasures. This mission will specifically test metalloporphyrin, an antioxidant that may protect against the irreversible oxidative damage observed in eye structure and function during and after spaceflight. This investigation could also lead to new therapies for neurovascular-related eye diseases and retinal degeneration in people on Earth.

== ISS hardware ==
The following ISS hardware is launched on SpaceX CRS-24:

Launch:

- Compact Ocean Wind Vector Radiometer (COWVR) - This instrument will launch in the trunk of Dragon and measure the direction and speed of winds at the ocean surface.
- Temporal Experiment for Storms and Tropical Systems (TEMPEST) - This instrument will launch in the trunk of Dragon and will investigate atmospheric humidity.
- Hydrogen Sensor - Critical environmental control and life support system hardware that monitors for the presence of excess hydrogen in generated oxygen, which helps inform NASA of warnings signs with the oxygen generator system's cell stack.
- Advanced Resistive Exercise Device (ARED) Knowledge Reaper Asset in a Kinetic Network (KRAKN) Electronics Box - This electronics box will upgrade the advanced resistive exercise device's legacy instrumentation box and will be utilized on-orbit by the crew members to support their exercise needs.
- Remote Power Control Module (RPCM) Type V Internal - Planned to replace a degraded unit currently installed, this RPCM Type V Internal supports the overall Electronic Power System by distributing power capabilities across the ISS.
- Fridge - Following a failure of an on-orbit Fridge unit, this spare Fridge will provide the required cold stowage facility capability on-orbit to support multiple investigations during Expeditions 66 and 67.
- EXPRESS Flowmeters - These critical spares measure the flow rates and provide a signal to command corresponding control valves for the EXPRESS (Expedite the Processing of Experiments to the Space Station) racks on-orbit, providing necessary capabilities to payload investigations.
- Rodent Research Hardware - Rodents, habitats, transporters, and support hardware required for the rodent-specific research mission during the SpX-24 duration.

Return:

- Hydrogen Dome - As one of the critical components of the Oxygen Generation System (OGS), this Hydrogen Dome unit was removed and replaced in October 2021 following a period of observed end of life characteristics. This unit is returning for test, teardown, and evaluation and refurbishment to support future demand on-orbit.
- Urine Processing Assembly Distillation Assembly - Critical environmental control and life support system orbital replacement unit used for urine distillation and processing on orbit. This hardware is returning for evaluation and refurbishment to support future spares demand and future on-orbit exploration objectives.
- Avionics Air Assembly Fan - With plans to return to ground for TT&E and refurbishment, this critical high-speed fan was previously installed in the Node 3 Water Process Assembly (WPA) rack.
- Total Organic Carbon Analyzer - Hardware designed to assess the total organic carbon levels in recovered water on board the ISS. This unit is returning to the ground for refurbishment after seven years of continuous operations.
- CO_{2}/Relative Humidity Sample Containers - Upgraded shuttle-era grab sample container technology that has been modified to collect payload samples and support critical exploration development objectives with thermal amine and four-bed carbon dioxide removal technology demonstrations.
- Rodent Research Transporters - Transporters returning following their usage to support the rodent investigation during the SpaceX CRS-24 mission duration. These refurbished transporters will support near-term demand for upcoming rodent missions.

== CubeSats ==
Five CubeSats were planned for deployment on this mission and on 26 January 2022 the Japanese Remote Manipulator System RMS arm extracted Nanoracks NRCSD-22 from the Kibō airlock; NRCSD-22 then ejected five cubesats (ELaNa 38):

- DAILI (Daily Atmospheric and Ionospheric Limb Imager) - The Aerospace Corporation, El Segundo, California
- FEES2 (Flexible Experimental Embedded Satellite 2)
- GASPACS (Get Away Special Passive Attitude Control Satellite) - Utah State University, Logan, Utah
- PATCOOL (Passive Thermal Coating Observatory Operating in Low-Earth Orbit) - NASA, Kennedy Space Center, Florida and the University of Florida
- TARGIT (Tethering and Ranging mission of the Georgia Institute of Technology) - Atlanta, Georgia

== Return ==
One of the four parachutes' deployment lagged behind the others. The same issue was observed during SpaceX Crew-2.

== Gallery ==
SpaceX CRS-24
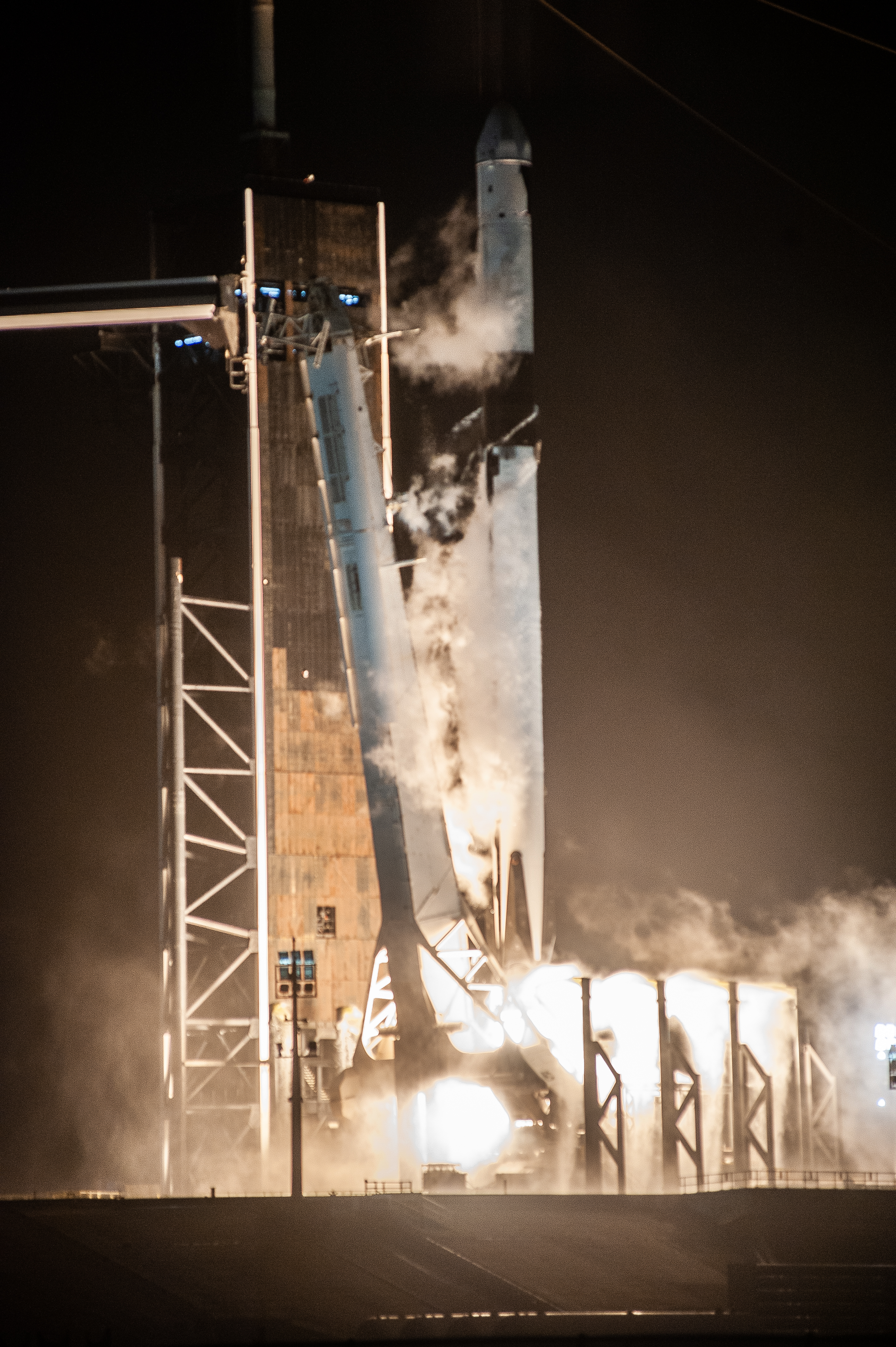
Launch of CRS-24

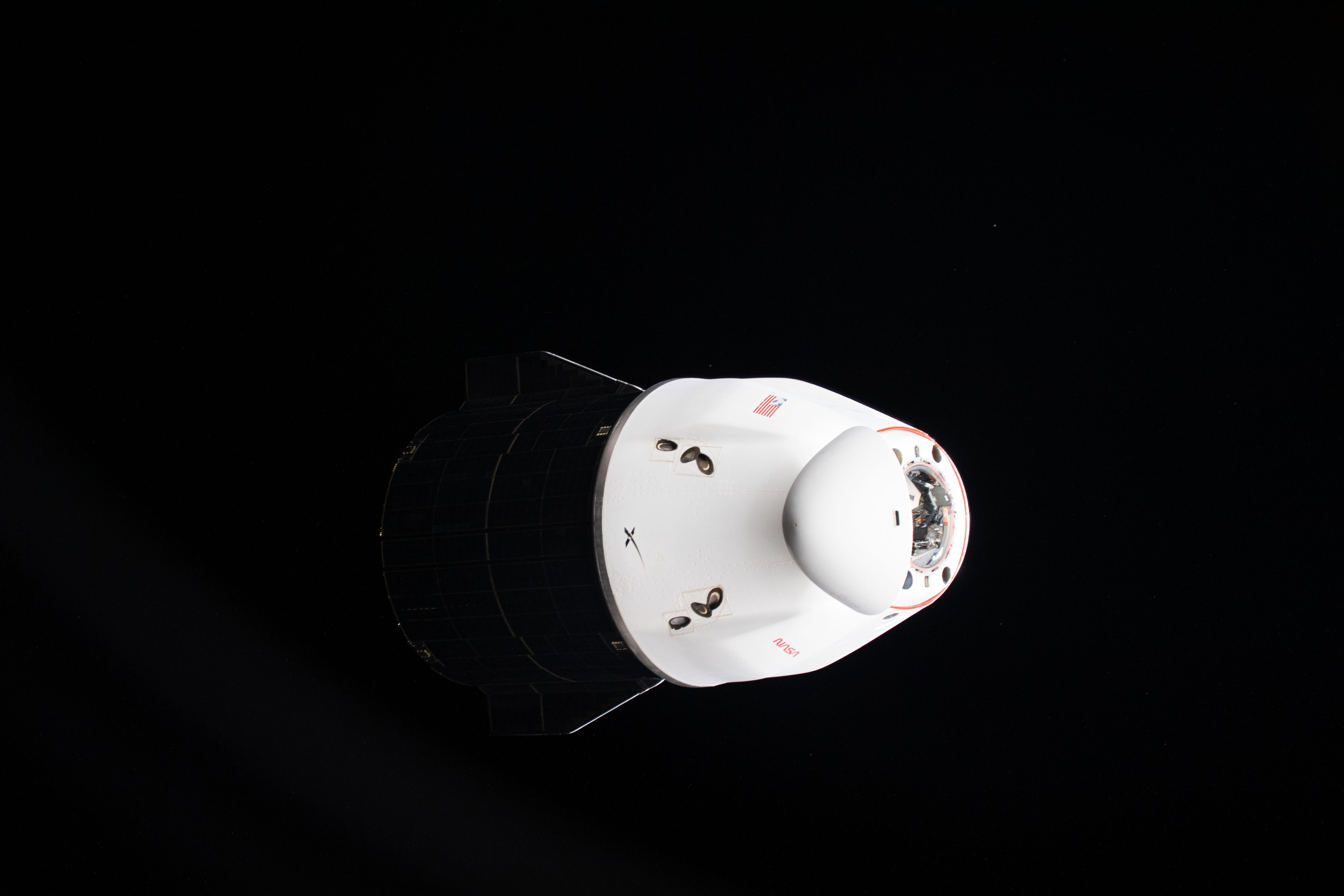
Cargo Dragon approaching the ISS

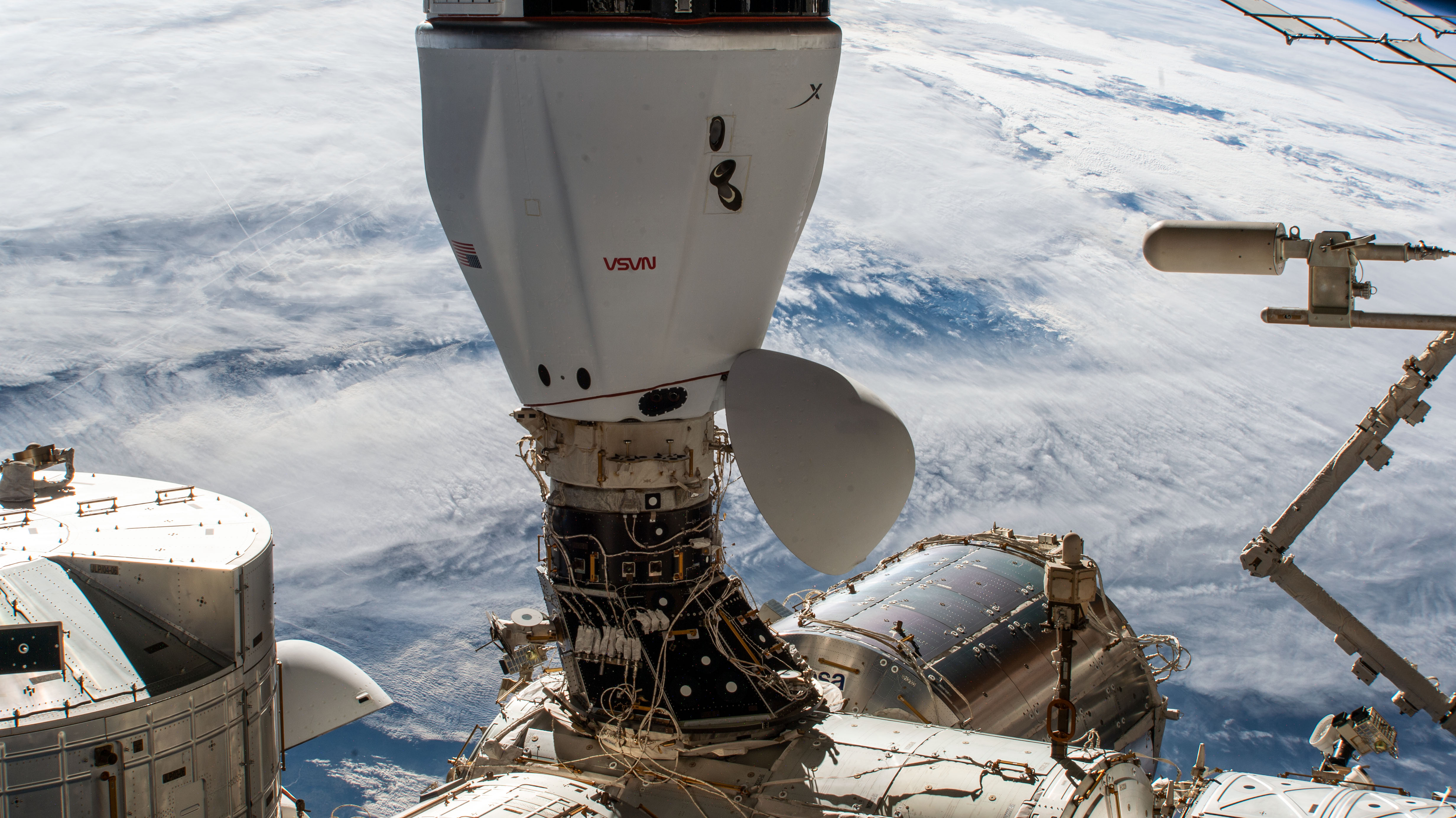
Cargo Dragon docked to the ISS

== See also ==
- Uncrewed spaceflights to the International Space Station
