= Analysing Interferometer for Ambient Air =

Instrument on ISS

Analysing Interferometer for Ambient Air (ANITA) is a trace gas monitoring system for the International Space Station (ISS). Monitoring air quality on ISS helps provide adequate life support for the crew. ANITA is developed by OHB and SINTEF under contract of ESA.

== Working principle ==
ANITA is based on Fourier-Transform-Infrared-Spectroscopy FTIR. Each measured gas absorbs light in a certain frequency, these spectral lines are analysed and a gas concentration is calculated.

== Development ==
ANITA-1 was operating from Sept 2007 until Aug 2008 on board the ISS. It weighed >55kg which was distributed in 2 Middeck Locker Inserts and a Laptop. Power consumption was approx. 150W. It was able to measure more than 32 trace gases on board the ISS.

ANITA-2 launched on SpaceX CRS-24 in Dec. 2021. It has been significantly reduced in size (1 Middeck Locker Insert) and mass (<38kg). The total power consumption is approx. 80W. It features WiFi Connection and a Touch Screen for a more versatile use. Compared to ANITA-1 it has a significantly increased (~factor 4) Signal to Noise Ratio allowing lower detection limits. ANITA-2 is calibrated to detect 37 gases, mostly with a detection limit well below 1ppm. ANITA-2 was installed in an Express Rack inside the Destiny Lab by Matthias Maurer January 5, 2022. ANITA-2 is running nearly continuously on board the ISS since March 2022 and is monitoring the gas environment.

== Usage ==
Using ANITA-1 Freon 218 was able to be detected on board the ISS, which was probably leaking from a Russian cooling loop.
