= Mochii =

Miniature scanning electron microscope

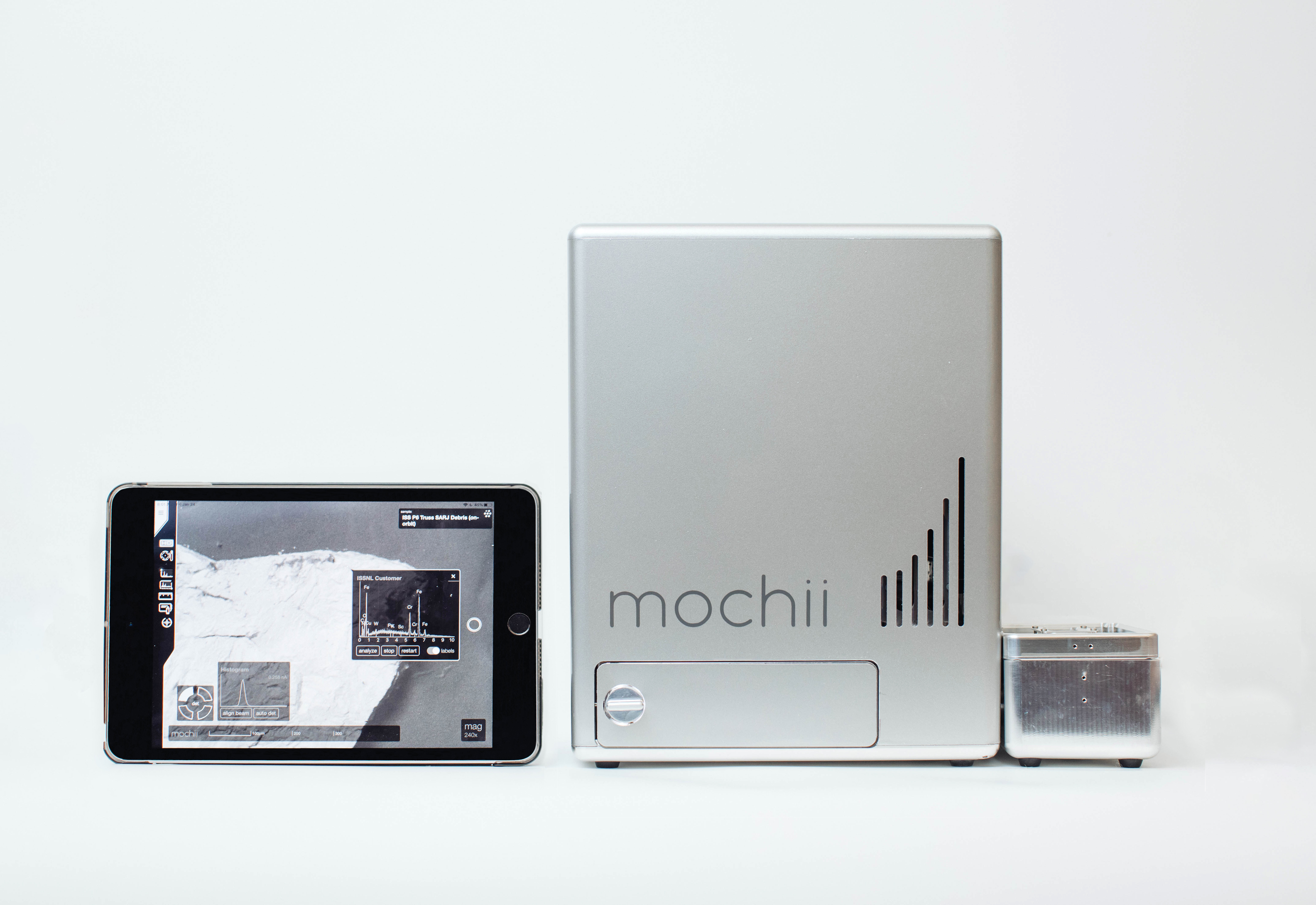
- Developer: Voxa
- Type: Scanning electron microscope
- Dimensions: 210 mm × 210 mm × 265 mm
- Website: Official website

Mochii is a miniature scanning electron microscope made by Seattle-based startup company Voxa. The Mochii has the same capabilities as a conventional SEM, such as usage in materials science for research purposes, microchip and semiconductor quality control, and medicine. Mochii users are able to operate the microscope using an IOS app.

== History ==
Development of what ended up being the Mochii began in 2012. The goal of the Mochii was to take scanning electron microscopes, conventionally large, expensive, and unwieldy tools, and shrink them down in order to decrease cost and increase portability.

In 2015, Voxa began collaborating with NASA who saw the potential of taking the Mochii to space. In the last few years, NASA has provided upwards of $450,000 for the development of the Mochii. The Mochii had to confront issues unique to space-based operation such as "errant fluid behavior, residual gravity gradients, cosmic rays, and safety of flight".

In 2018, the Mochii won the Microscopy Today Innovation Award, an industry award given for inventions that make microscopy more efficient and powerful.

In June 2019, the Mochii participated in the 23rd NEEMO (NASA Extreme Environment Mission Operations) mission.

On February 15, 2020, the Mochii launched on the Cygnus cargo spacecraft, headed to the ISS. Voxa's microscope is supposed to help with on-site imaging at the ISS, this eliminates the need for sending the sample back down to Earth which has the issues of cost, time, and potential sample damage.

== Specifications ==
The Mochii measures 21 cm × 21 cm × 26.5 cm and weighs around 6 pounds. The SEM's stage measures 2 cm × 2 cm × 1.5 cm. The Mochii has a swap-able optical cartridge that eliminates the need for in-person servicing. The cartridge has a source potential of 10 kV, a 5000x magnification, a backscatter array detector, and auto-calibration. The microscope is capable of EDS, a technique which analyzes the energy spectrum of a sample in order to find out the abundance of certain elements. The Mochii comes outfitted with an app that runs on Apple devices that run IOS 8 or higher.
