= SpaceX CRS-12 =

2017 American resupply spaceflight to the ISS

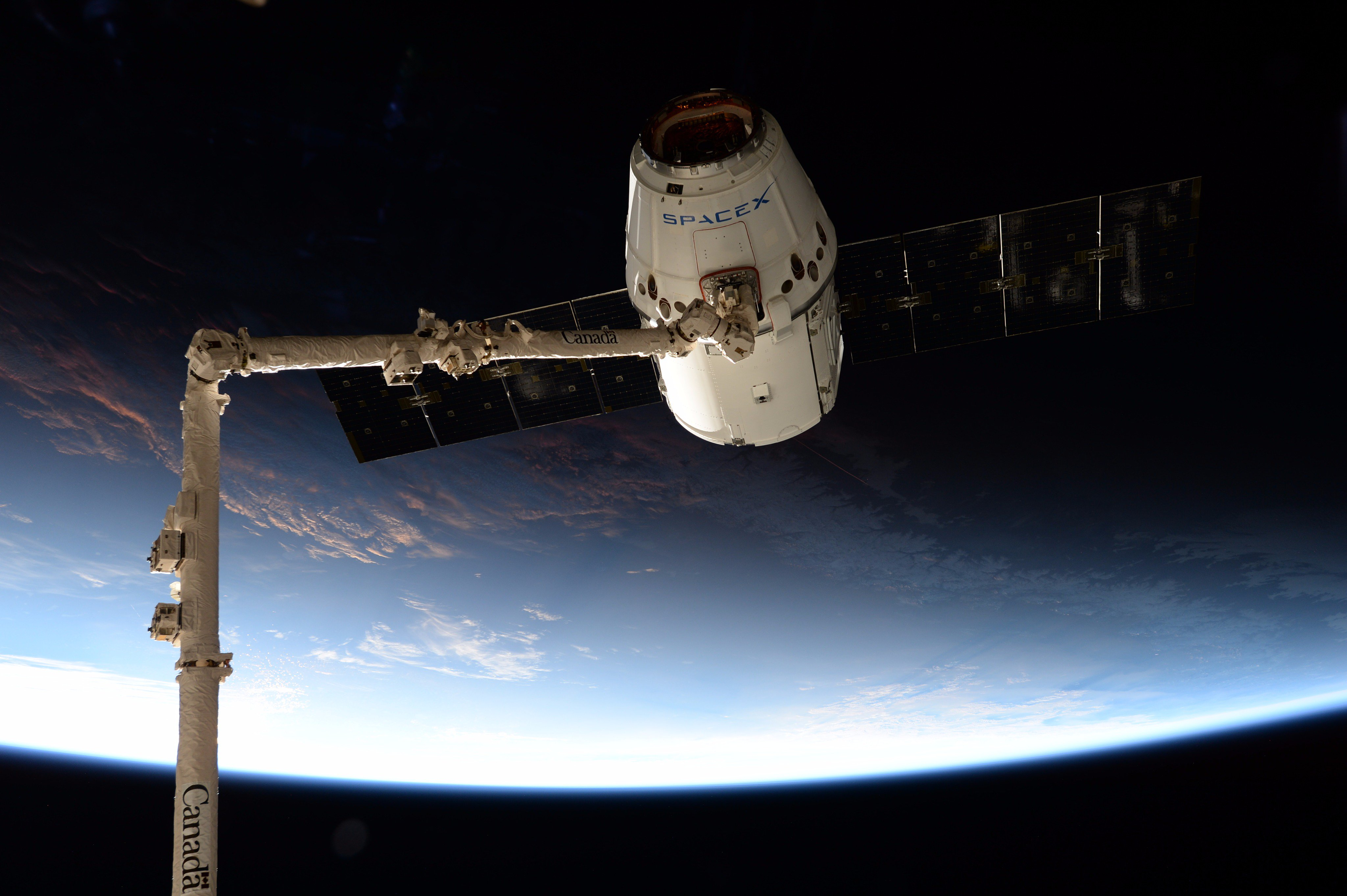
- The CRS-12 Dragon spacecraft grappled by Canadarm2
- Names: SpX-12
- Mission type: ISS resupply
- Operator: SpaceX
- COSPAR ID: 2017-045A
- SATCAT no.: 42904
- Mission duration: 33 days, 21 hours, 42 minutes

Spacecraft properties
- Spacecraft: Dragon 1 C113
- Spacecraft type: Dragon 1
- Manufacturer: SpaceX
- Dry mass: 4,200 kg (9,300 lb)
- Dimensions: Height: 6.1 m (20 ft); Diameter: 3.7 m (12 ft)

Start of mission
- Launch date: 14 August 2017, 16:31:37 UTC
- Rocket: Falcon 9 Full Thrust Block 4 (B1039)
- Launch site: Kennedy Space Center, LC-39A
- Contractor: SpaceX

End of mission
- Landing date: 17 September 2017, 14:14 UTC
- Landing site: Pacific Ocean

Orbital parameters
- Reference system: Geocentric
- Regime: Low Earth
- Inclination: 51.6°

Berthing at ISS
- Berthing port: Harmony nadir
- RMS capture: 16 August 2017, 10:52 UTC
- Berthing date: 16 August 2017, 13:07 UTC
- Unberthing date: 16 September 2017
- RMS release: 17 September 2017, 08:40 UTC
- Time berthed: 31 days

Cargo
- Mass: 2,910 kg (6,415 lb)
- Pressurised: 1,652 kg (3,642 lb)
- Unpressurised: 1,258 kg (2,773 lb)
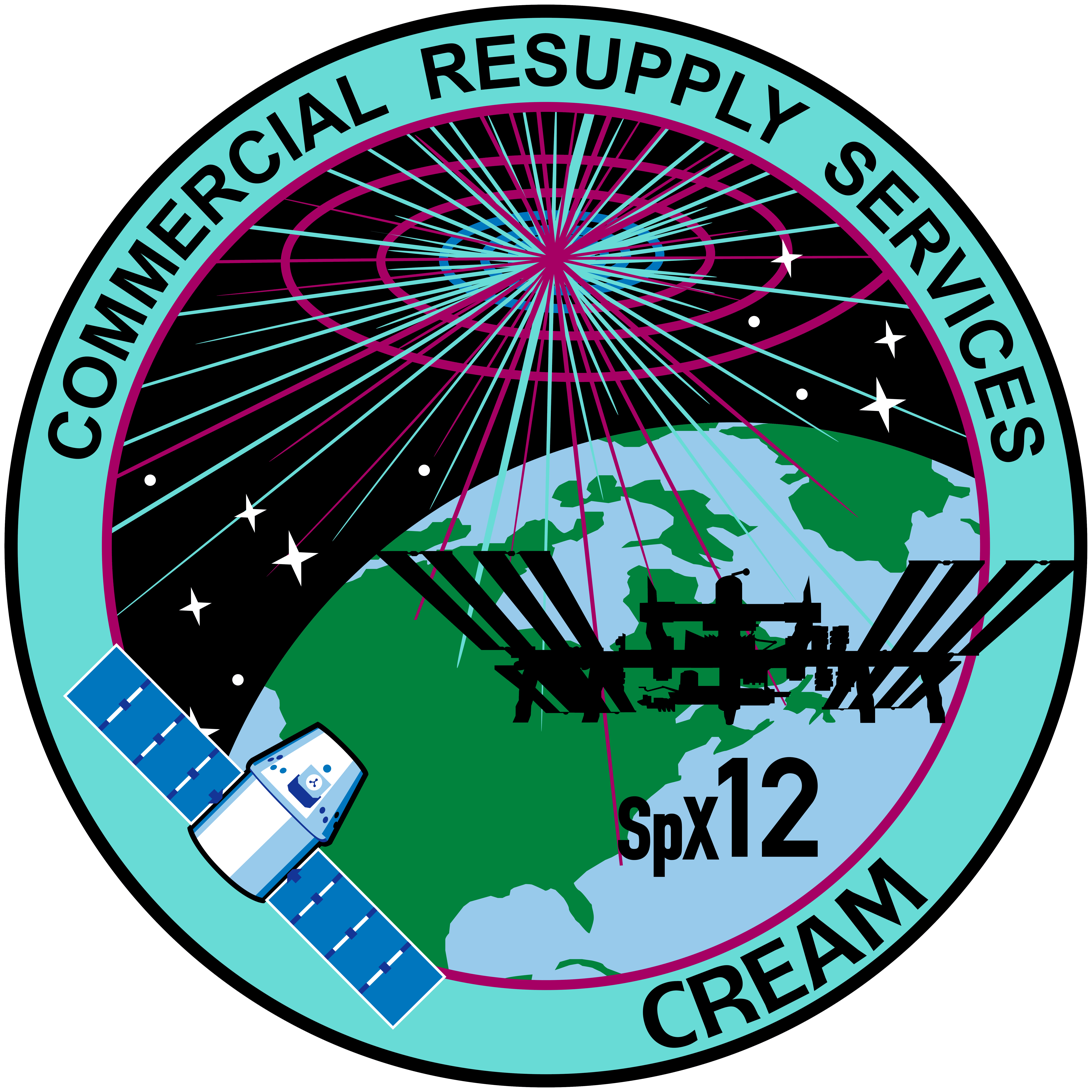
- NASA SpX-12 mission patch Commercial Resupply Services Cargo Dragon

SpaceX CRS-12, also known as SpX-12, was a Commercial Resupply Services mission to the International Space Station launched on 14 August 2017. The mission was contracted by NASA and was flown by SpaceX using a new Dragon capsule. The Falcon 9 rocket's reusable first stage performed a controlled landing on Landing Zone 1 (LZ1) at Cape Canaveral Air Force Station. After delivering more than 2,900 kilograms (6,400 lb) of cargo, the Dragon spacecraft returned to Earth on 17 September 2017.

== Mission overview ==
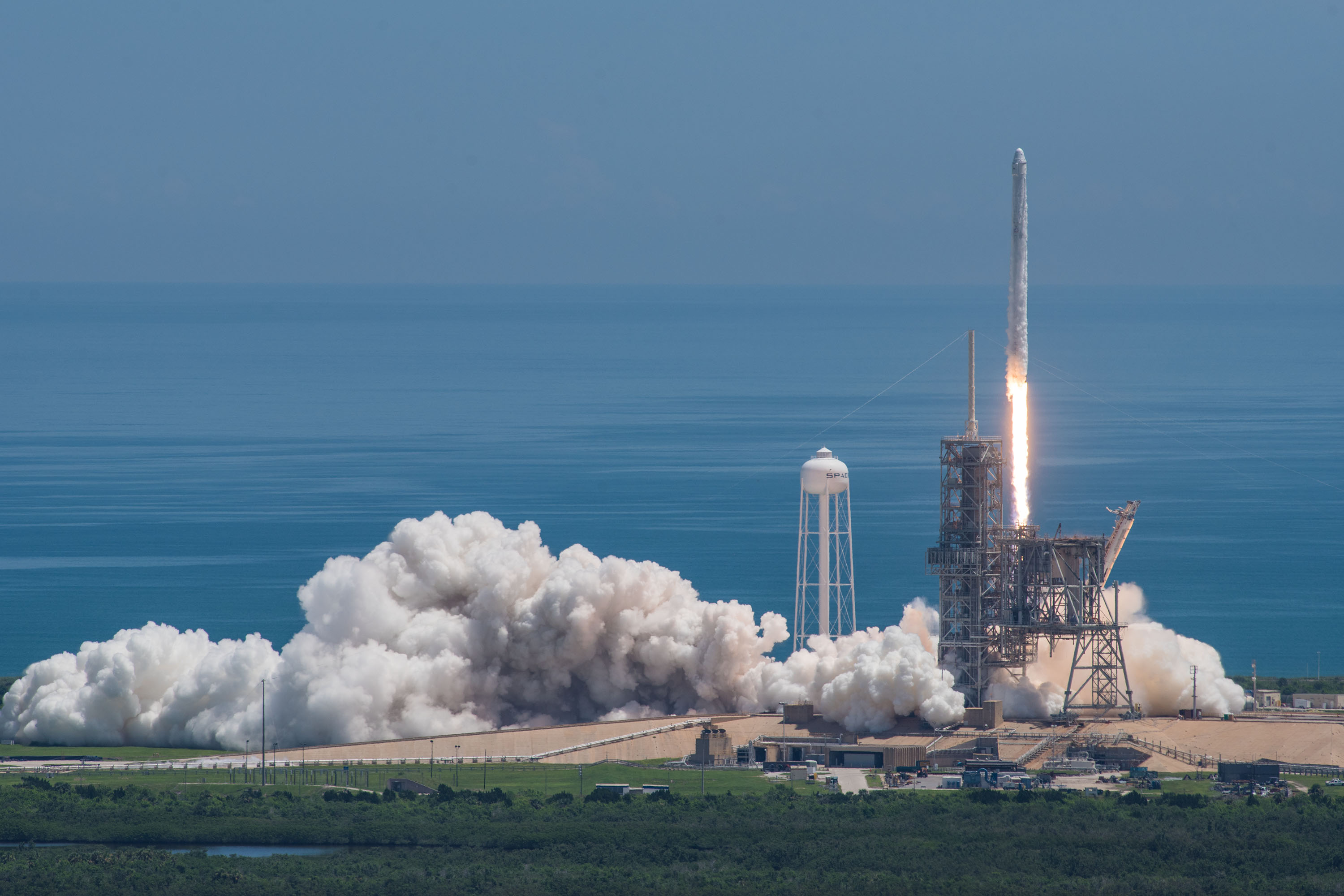
Launch of the CRS-12 mission

CRS-12 is the last of the original order of twelve missions awarded to SpaceX under the CRS contract. Originally scheduled for December 2016, the flight was delayed multiple times to August 2017. Launch occurred on 14 August 2017 at 16:31:37 UTC from Kennedy Space Center's Launch Complex 39A aboard a SpaceX Falcon 9 rocket. After Dragon rendezvoused with the ISS on 16 August 2017, the station's Canadarm2 grappled the spacecraft at 10:52 UTC. It was then berthed to the Harmony module at 13:07 UTC.

Having been at the ISS for a month, the CRS-12 Dragon capsule was unberthed in the late hours of 16 September 2017 and was released by the Canadarm2 on 17 September at 08:40 UTC. After performing separation burns to take it out of the vicinity of the ISS, the Dragon performed a deorbit burn to enable atmospheric reentry. The spacecraft successfully landed in the Pacific Ocean at 14:14 UTC, returning approximately 1,700 kilograms (3,800 lb) of experiments and equipment to Earth.

== Payload ==
NASA has contracted for the CRS-12 mission from SpaceX and therefore determines the primary payload, date/time of launch, and orbital parameters for the Dragon space capsule. CRS-12 carried a total of 2,910 kg (6,415 lb) of material into orbit. This included 1,652 kg (3,642 lb) of pressurised cargo with packaging bound for the International Space Station, and 1,258 kg (2,773 lb) of unpressurised cargo composed of the CREAM instrument, to be mounted externally to the ISS.

The following is a breakdown of cargo bound for the ISS:

- Science investigations: 916 kg (2,019 lb)
- Crew supplies: 220 kg (485 lb)
- Vehicle hardware: 339 kg (747 lb)
- Spacewalk equipment: 30 kg (66 lb)
- Computer resources: 53 kg (117 lb)
- External payloads:
  - Cosmic-Ray Energetics and Mass (CREAM): 1,258 kg (2,773 lb)

== Gallery ==
SpaceX CRS-12
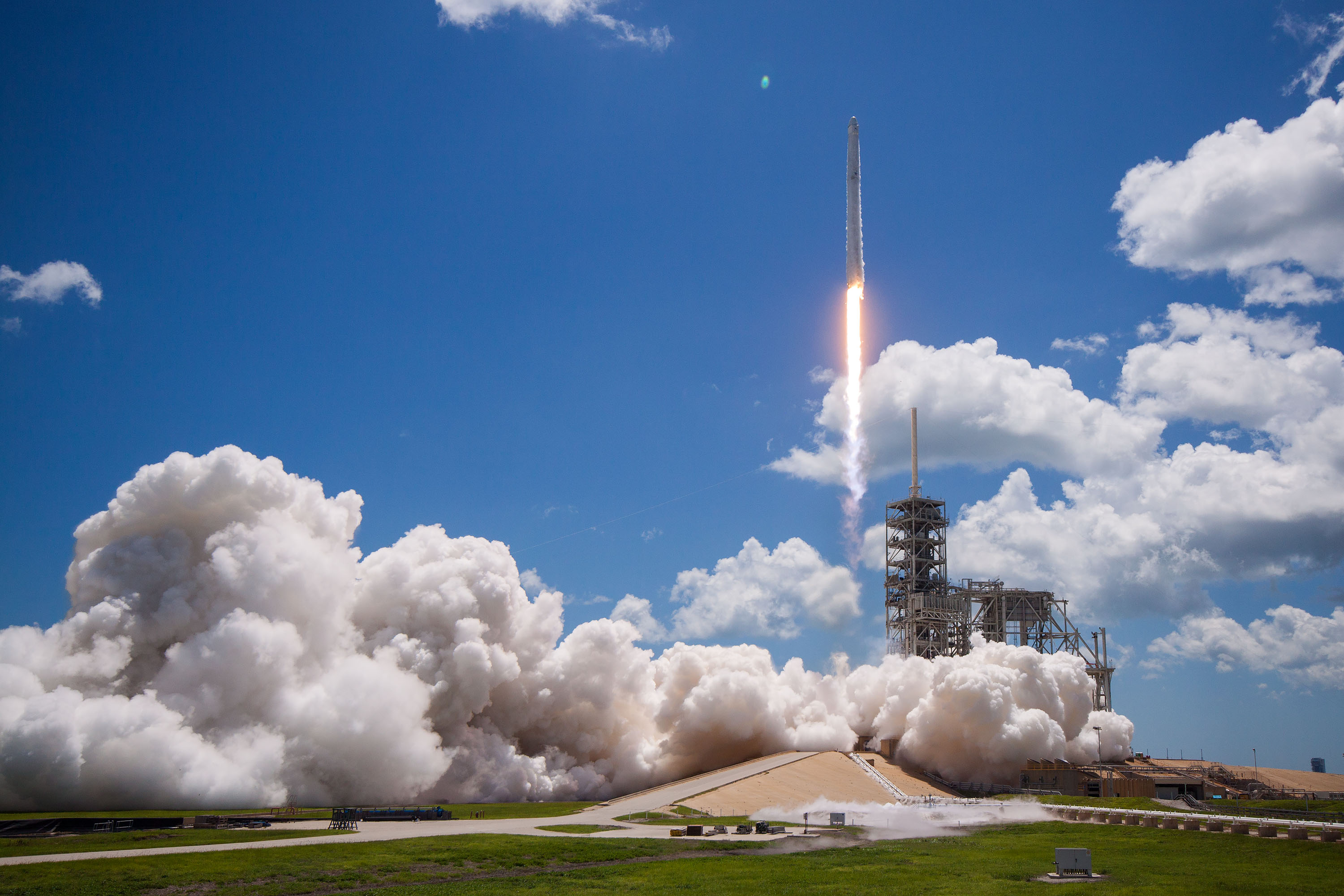
Launch of CRS-12

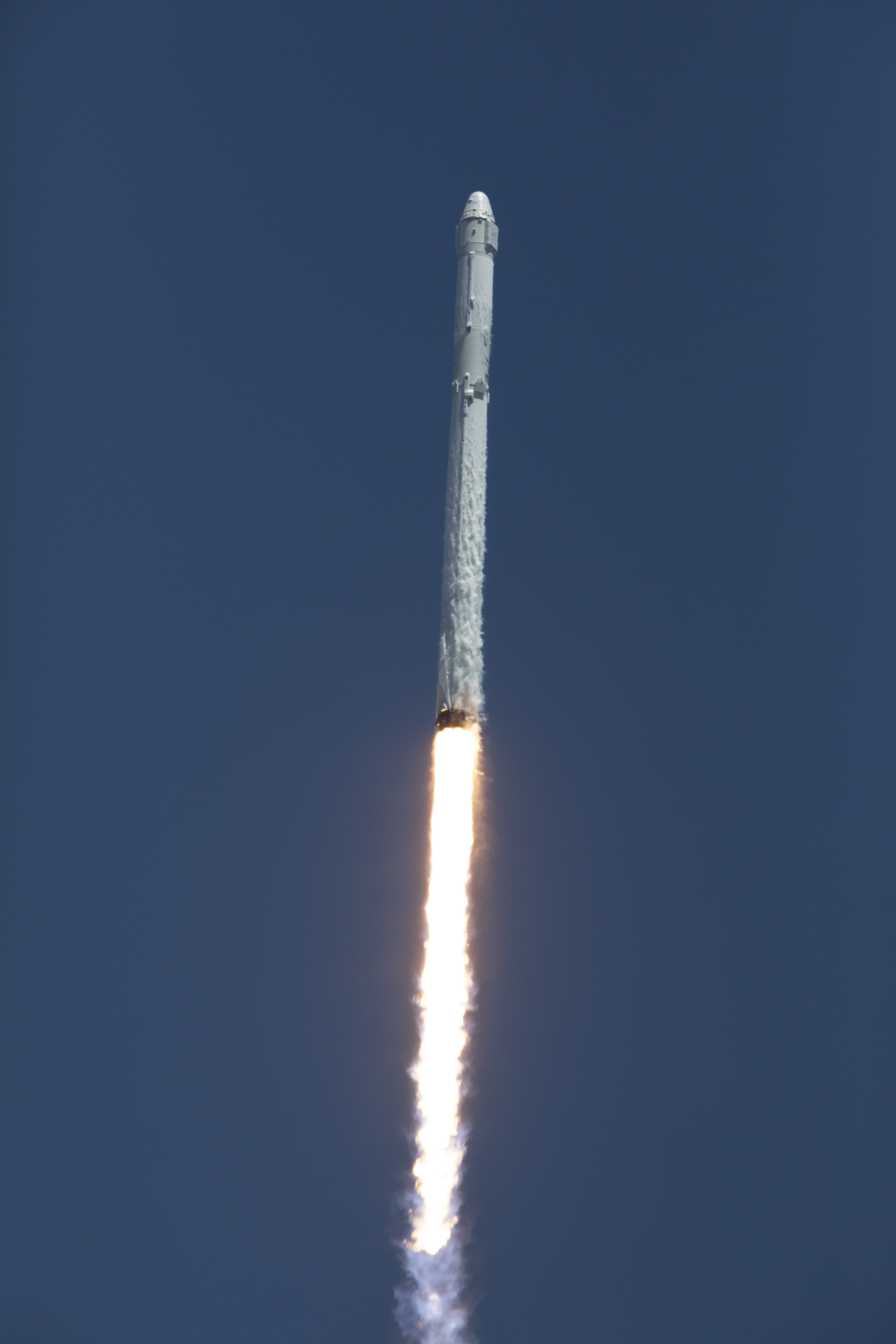
Falcon 9 ascending with CRS-12

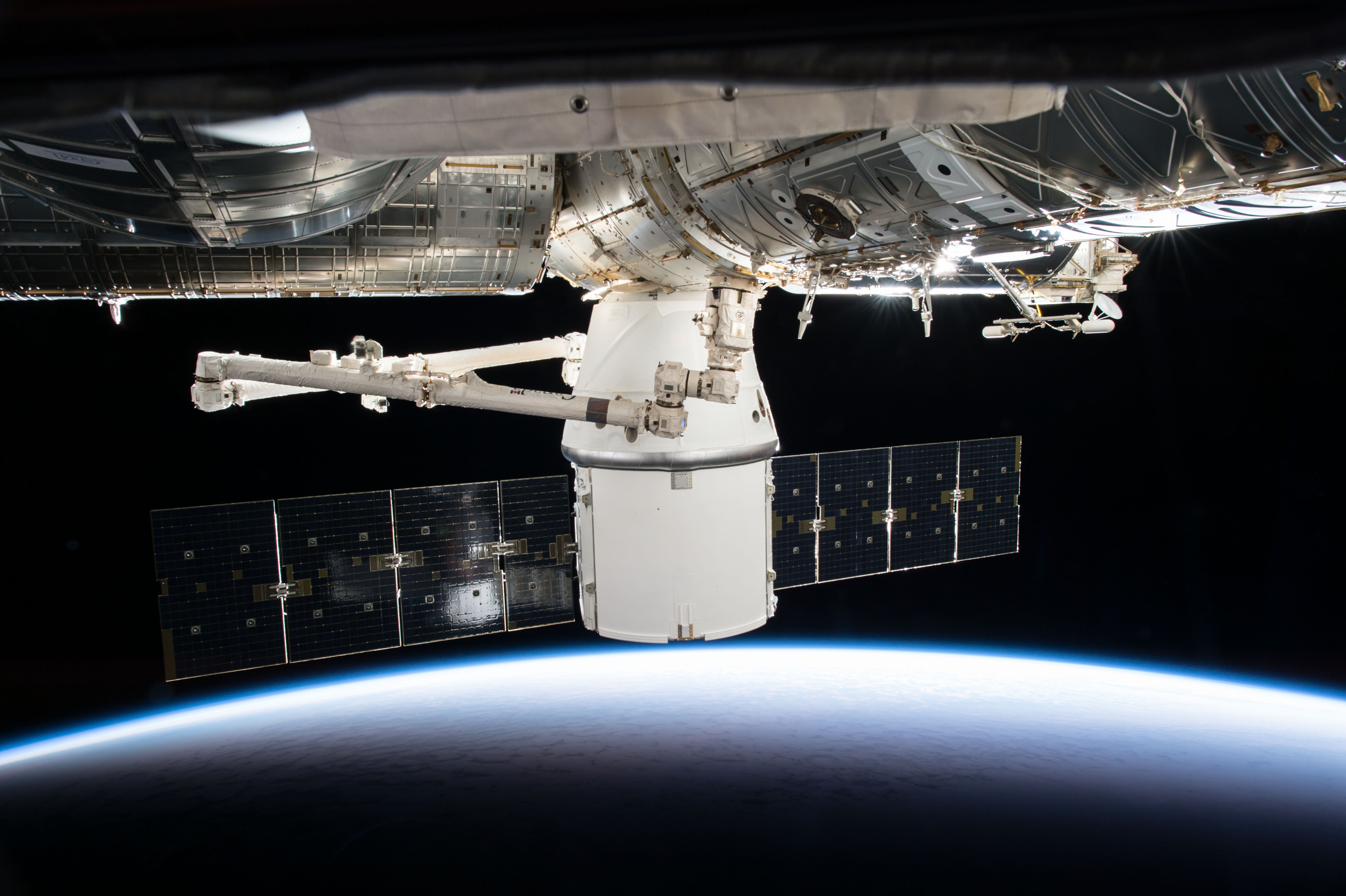
Dragon docked to the ISS

== See also ==
- Uncrewed spaceflights to the International Space Station
- List of Falcon 9 and Falcon Heavy launches
- 2017 in spaceflight
