= Cosmic Ray Energetics and Mass Experiment =

Experiment to determine the composition of cosmic rays

Cosmic Ray Energetics and Mass (CREAM) is an experiment to determine the composition of cosmic rays up to the 10^{15} eV (also known as the "knee prospect") in the cosmic ray spectrum.

It has been hypothesized that the knee prospect of the cosmic ray spectrum can be explained by the theoretical maximum energy that a supernova can accelerate particles to according to Fermi acceleration. The measurements are accomplished using a timing-based charge detector and transition radiation detector sent to an altitude of at least 34 km (21 mi) with aid of a high-altitude balloon.

After launching from McMurdo Station in Antarctica, the balloon will stay aloft for 60–100 days gathering data on charges and energies of the unimpeded cosmic rays that strike the detectors.

== Expected outcomes ==
One of the advantages of this type of experiment is that it is possible to identify the original particle that would have caused the air shower detected by ground-based detectors. Maximum detectable energy level is determined by duration of the flight and size of the detector; a difficult barrier to get around for experiments of this type. An accurate measurement of the composition of cosmic rays is necessary in order to understand the origins of the cosmic rays found above the "knee" at 10^{15} eV. To date, the CREAM balloon experiments have accumulated a total of 161 days of exposure, longer than any other single balloon-borne experiment.

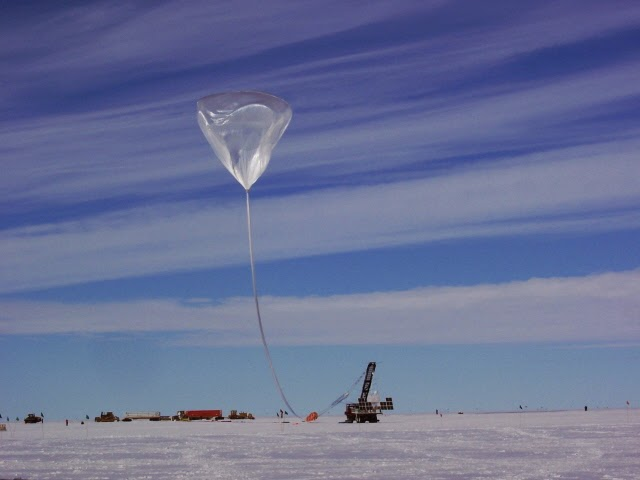
CREAM III takes flight in Antarctica

== Experimental goals ==
- Can the "knee" be explained by maximum acceleration due to supernovae?
- Have the composition of cosmic rays changed over time?
- Are multiple mechanisms responsible for the production of cosmic rays?

== Construction ==
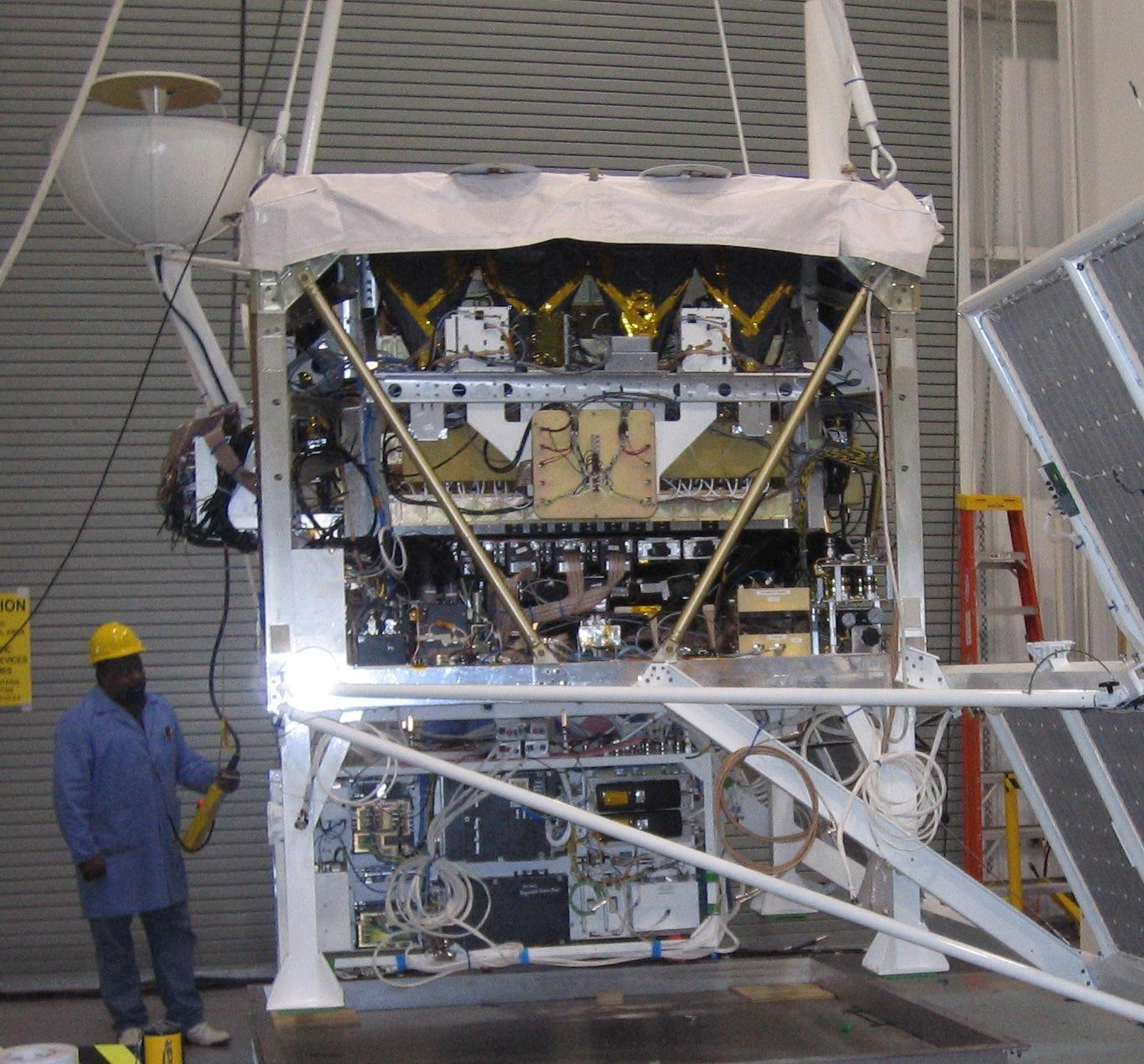
Instrumentation of CREAM II.

In order to answer these questions, it is of particular interest to investigate cosmic rays in the 10^{12} to 10^{15} eV region due to several theories predicting a change in elemental composition just below the knee. To determine the elemental spectrum of cosmic rays, CREAM uses a silicon charge detector, timing charge detector, and scintillating fiber hodoscopes to detect the charge of incident particles up to that of iron (Z = 26). Energies are measured with a transition radiation detector (TRD), along with an ionization calorimeter. Because all detectors are in close proximity of each other, it is a prime concern to minimize the interaction between showers produced in the calorimeter, and the charge-measuring instruments. To dampen this effect, CREAM uses a larger number of pixels with a smaller area, along with a very fast readout time to differentiate between events caused by the primary particle and events caused by back-scattering from the calorimeter.

The relatively low density of the TRD allows for a larger detector geometry to detect particles with a lower flux. By measuring the Lorentz factor γ, combined with knowledge of the particle's charge, it is possible to calibrate the detector with various cosmic rays of charge ±1 (electrons, pions, muons, etc.). Because of the relatively low geomagnetic cutoff energy for cosmic rays near the South Pole, a cherenkov detector is placed between modules of the TRD to act as a veto for these low-energy particles.

For power, the system includes batteries for energy storage, along with a solar array rated to sustain the mission for 100 days. Altogether, the instrument is expected to draw only 380 watts from a 28-volt supply, thanks to a very careful choice of energy-efficient electronics. In near-vacuum conditions, significant precautions must be taken against coronal discharges between unshielded electronics operating at as low as 100 volts. This is mitigated by encasing all relevant electronics in a lightweight dielectric compound, such as plaster.

The instrument must be able to operate in a wide range of temperatures, as the high albedo of Antarctica can cause very high temperatures, while periods of darkness will result in very low temperatures.

Excluding the ballast, total weight of the instrument must not exceed 5,500 pounds (2,500 kg) to reach the desired altitude. Retrieval is done by separating the instrument from the balloon after a sufficient amount of exposure, and a parachute opens to somewhat slow the descent of the instrument. Although the experiment is designed to meet the structural requirements of the Columbia Scientific Balloon Facility, it is inevitable that some damage will be incurred to replaceable parts of the instrument. The main priority is data retrieval; all other systems are considered secondary at this point.

== CREAM Flights ==
CREAM Flights (Launch history)
Year	Start Date (UTC)	End Date (UTC)	Flight	Reference
2004	December 16, 2004	January 27, 2005	CREAM I	
2005	December 15, 2005	January 13, 2006	CREAM II	
2007	December 18, 2007	January 17, 2008	CREAM III	
2008	December 18, 2008	January 7, 2009	CREAM IV	
2009	December 1, 2009	January 8, 2010	CREAM V	
2010	December 21, 2010	December 26, 2010	CREAM VI	
2016	November 28, 2016		BACCUS	
2017	August 13, 2017	February 2019	ISS-CREAM	

=== ISS-CREAM ===
Pronounced "ice-cream", ISS-CREAM is the next generation version of the CREAM balloon experiments that was sent to the International Space Station on August 14, 2017, with the CRS-12 mission, and will be installed permanently to the station. Located at an altitude of 410 km, 10 times higher than previous balloon flights, ISS-CREAM will be able to take data almost non-stop during its three-year mission. Because of the extreme altitude, there is no atmosphere for incident particles to scatter off of before reaching the detector. It was expected that this ISS-based mission will gather an order of magnitude more data than the CREAM balloon experiments.

Following the project management woes, ISS-CREAM was switched off in February 2019.

== Funding ==
CREAM experiments are currently being funded by NASA.

== Collaborators ==
The current CREAM collaboration team includes members from

- University of Maryland
- Pennsylvania State University
- Sungkyunkwan University
- National Autonomous University of Mexico
- Laboratoire de Physique Subatomique et de Cosmologie of Grenoble, France
- Kyungpook National University
- Goddard Space Flight Center
- Wallops Flight Facility and
- Northern Kentucky University

== See also ==
- Cosmic Ray System (Cosmic ray experiment on the Voyagers)
