= Falcon 9 first-stage landing tests =

Proofs of the SpaceX booster's reusability

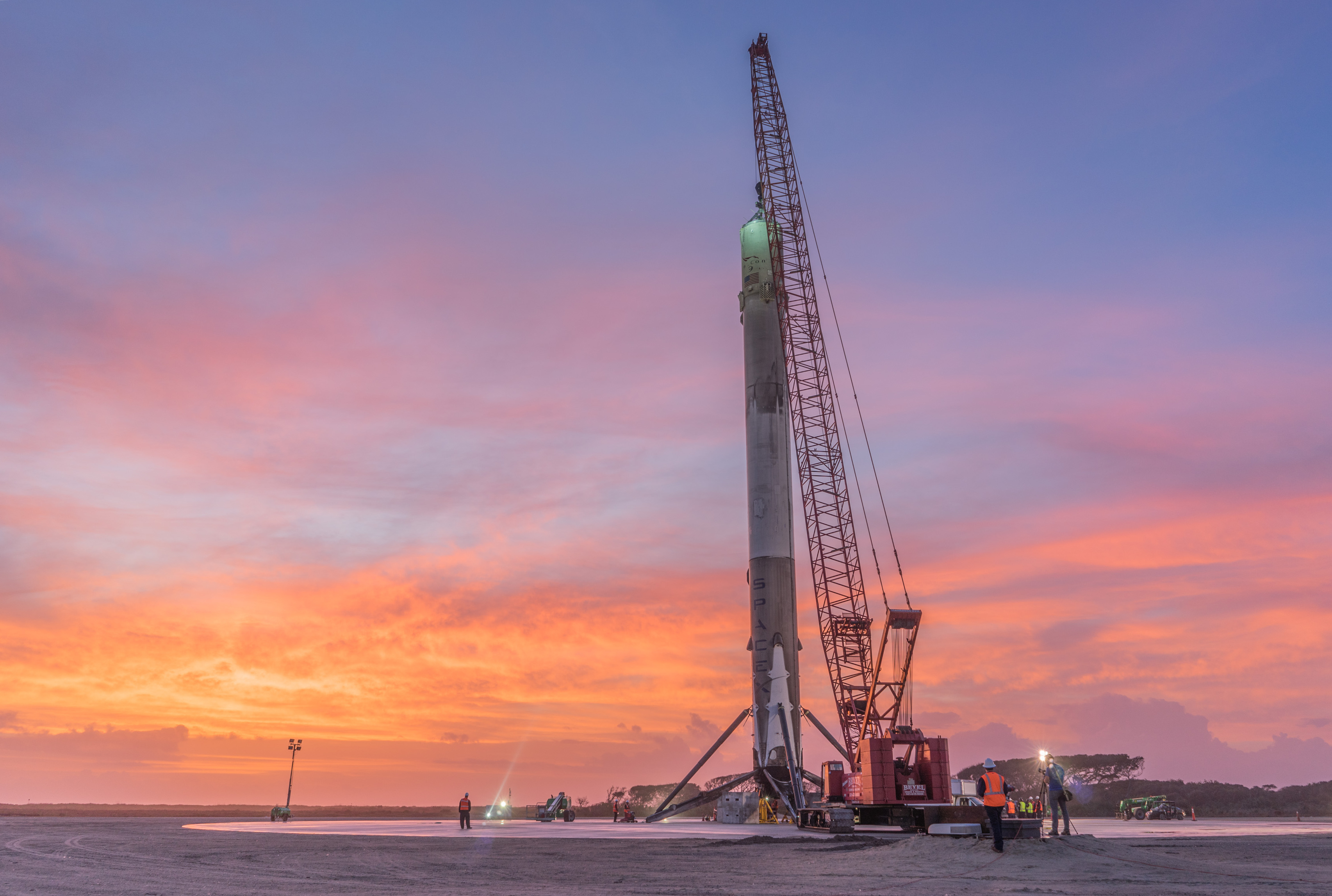
The first stage of Falcon 9 flight 20 successfully landed for the first time on a ground pad at Landing Zone 1, Cape Canaveral Air Force Station, after propelling 11 Orbcomm OG2 satellites to orbit.

The Falcon 9 first-stage landing tests were a series of controlled-descent flight tests conducted by SpaceX between 2013 and 2016. Since 2017, the first stage of Falcon 9 rockets are routinely landed if the performance requirements of the launch allow.

The program's objective was to reliably execute controlled re-entry, descent and landing (EDL) of the Falcon 9 first stage into Earth's atmosphere after the stage completes the boost phase of an orbital spaceflight. The first tests aimed to touch down vertically in the ocean at zero velocity. Later tests attempted to land the rocket precisely on an autonomous spaceport drone ship (a barge commissioned by SpaceX to provide a stable landing surface at sea) or at Landing Zone 1 (LZ-1), a concrete pad at Cape Canaveral. The first ground landing at LZ-1 succeeded in December 2015, and the first landing at sea on a drone ship in April 2016. The second landed booster, B1021, was the first to fly again in March 2017, and was recovered a second time.

== Landings of Falcon 9 first-stage boosters ==
- Ground-pad failure
- Drone-ship failure
- Ocean test failure (Note: Controlled descent; ocean touchdown control failed; no recovery)
- Parachute test failure (Note: Passive reentry failed before parachute deployment)
- Ground-pad success
- Drone-ship success
- Ocean test success (Note: Controlled descent; soft vertical ocean touchdown; no recovery)
- No attempt

== Overview ==
The first landing test occurred in September 2013 on the sixth flight of a Falcon 9 and maiden launch of the v1.1 rocket version. From 2013 to 2016, sixteen test flights were conducted, six of which achieved a soft landing and recovery of the booster:

- flight 20 (Orbcomm OG2 M2) safely touching down on the LZ-1 ground pad upon first attempt in December 2015;
- flight 23 (CRS-8) achieving a stable landing at sea in the Atlantic on the drone ship Of Course I Still Love You in April 2016 after four previous attempts ended in destruction of the booster upon impact;
- flights 24 (JCSAT-14) and 25 (Thaicom 8) returning at higher speed from GTO missions at sea on a drone ship in May 2016;
- flight 27 (CRS-9) returning to LZ-1 in July 2016;
- flight 28 (JCSAT-16) landing on a drone ship in August 2016.

Since the January 2017 return to flight, SpaceX has stopped referring to landing attempts as "experimental", indicating that they have become a routine procedure (see Iridium-1 and CRS-10 press kits of 2017, compared with CRS-9 and JCSAT-16 of 2016). By 2017, 14 routine landings had been performed (100% success) and three missions were launched in expendable configuration, not attempting to land.

The first-stage descent tests were part of the larger SpaceX reusable launch system development program, which included a large amount of new technology development activities and earlier low-altitude test flights at the SpaceX facility in McGregor, Texas in preparation for the high-altitude high-velocity testing of landing test phase of the program. The overall objective of the program is to privately develop reusable rockets using vertical-landing technology so as to substantially reduce the cost of space access.

Traditionally, the first stages of orbital carrier rockets have been discarded in the ocean once the ascent was complete. Achieving routine recovery and reuse of the launch vehicles could substantially reduce the cost of access to space.

== History ==
From the beginning, Elon Musk wanted the first stage of SpaceX launch vehicles to be recoverable, and all Falcon 1 launches and the first two Falcon 9 launches had parachutes. However the boosters burned up on reentry, before the parachutes even deployed. After seeing the success of Masten Space Systems Xombie in-air relight and vertical landing, SpaceX began evaluating this technique for use on Falcon 9. Experimental prototypes were built and flown during 2012 to 2014 to test the idea of propulsive landings and to gain experience.

SpaceX first announced in March 2013, that it would instrument and equip subsequent Falcon 9 first stages as controlled-descent test vehicles, able to propulsively decelerate to a soft touchdown over the water surface. The company expected to begin these flight tests in 2013, with an attempt to return the vehicle to the launch site for a powered landing no earlier than mid-2014.

In the event, SpaceX performed its first controlled-descent test flight in 2013 but continued the over-water testing well into 2015. Following analysis of telemetry data from the first controlled descent in September 2013, SpaceX announced that a large amount of new technology passed their real-life test objectives, and that coupled with the technology advancements made on the Grasshopper prototype, they were now ready to test the full EDL process to recover the first stage. The rocket was "able to successfully transition from vacuum through hypersonic, through supersonic, through transonic, light the engines all the way and control the stage all the way through [the atmosphere]".

This second EDL test took place during the third cargo resupply mission for NASA in April 2014. SpaceX attached landing legs to the first stage, decelerated the stage through atmospheric re-entry and attempted a simulated landing over water, following the separation of the second stage carrying the Dragon capsule to the ISS. The first stage was slowed down sufficiently to perform a soft touchdown over the Atlantic Ocean. SpaceX announced in February 2014 that they intended to continue over-water tests of the first stage until mastering precision control of the vehicle from hypersonic speed all the way through subsonic regimes.

Subsequent tests, starting with the CRS-5 mission in January 2015, attempted to land the first stage on an autonomous spaceport drone ship stationed off the Florida coastline or in the Pacific Ocean depending on launch site. The ships were used for six landing attempts, two of which succeeded in April and May 2016. Meanwhile, the first attempt to land on solid ground at Cape Canaveral occurred on December 21, 2015, and succeeded.

== Post-mission test plan ==
Thermal imaging of the controlled-descent test from stage separation onward, on Falcon 9 flight 13, September 21, 2014. Footage shows the first stage maneuvering out of the second stage plume; coasting near peak altitude of approximately 140 km (87 mi); performing a boost-back burn to limit downrange distance; controlled ballistic descent; and reentry burn from approximately 70 km (43 mi) to 40 km (25 mi) altitude. The landing burn is not visible, as clouds obscured the infrared imaging at low altitude.

The post-mission Falcon 9 test plan for the earliest flight tests called for the first stage to perform a retro-propulsion burn in the upper atmosphere to slow it and put it on a descent ballistic trajectory to its target landing location, followed by a second burn in the lower atmosphere before the first stage reached the water. SpaceX announced in March 2013 that it intended to conduct such tests on Falcon 9 v1.1 launch vehicles and would "continue doing such tests until they can do a return to the launch site and a powered landing". The company said it expected several failures before it could land the vehicle successfully.

In detailed information disclosed in the Falcon 9 flight 6 launch license for the CASSIOPE mission, SpaceX said it would fire three of the nine Merlin 1D engines initially to slow the horizontal velocity of the rocket and begin the attempt at a controlled descent. Then, shortly before hitting the ocean, one engine would be relighted in an attempt to reduce speed so that the stage could be recovered. As of September 2013, SpaceX said the experiment had approximately a ten percent chance of success.

SpaceX did not perform controlled-descent tests on all Falcon 9 v1.1 flights, as payloads going to GTO did not leave enough fuel margin. In September 2013, SpaceX announced that the CRS-3 mission of April 2014 (fourth flight of Falcon 9 v1.1) would be the second test of the descent test profile.

Whereas the early tests restarted the engines only twice, by the fourth flight test, in September 2014, SpaceX was reigniting the engines three times to accomplish its EDL test objectives (although only three of the nine engines were used): a boost-back burn, a reentry burn, and a landing burn. The boost-back burn limits downrange translation of the used stage; the reentry burn (from approximately 70 to 40 km (43 to 25 mi) altitude) is used to control the descent and deceleration profile at atmospheric interface; and the landing burn completes the deceleration from terminal velocity to zero at the landing surface.

== Test flights ==
=== Ocean touchdown attempts ===
==== Flight 6 ====
The first propulsive reentry, descent, and ocean-surface touchdown test occurred on September 29, 2013, on Falcon 9 flight 6, the maiden launch of the Falcon 9 rocket, version v1.1. After the three-minute boost phase and separation of the second stage with the CASSIOPE and nanosat payloads, the rocket's first stage was reoriented backwards and three of the nine Merlin 1D engines were reignited at high altitude to initiate a deceleration and controlled descent trajectory to the surface of the ocean. The first phase of the test "worked well and the first stage re-entered safely". However, the stage began to roll because of aerodynamic forces during the atmospheric descent and the roll rate exceeded the capabilities of the first stage attitude control system (ACS) to null it. The fuel in the tanks "centrifuged" to the outside of the tank and the single engine involved in the low-altitude deceleration maneuver shut down. SpaceX was able to retrieve some first-stage debris from the ocean. The company did not expect to recover the first stage on this flight, nor on the first several powered-descent tests, as predicted in their March 2013 announcement.

This first experimental descent was considered successful, achieving substantial test milestones and collecting engineering data, despite losing the stage into the ocean. SpaceX tested a large amount of new technology on this flight, and, combining those results with the advances made on the Grasshopper demonstrator, the company believed it had "all the pieces of the puzzle".

==== Flight 9 ====
The second test of controlled-descent hardware and software on the first stage occurred on April 8, 2014, and became the first successful controlled ocean soft touchdown of a liquid-rocket-engine orbital first stage. The first stage included landing legs for the first time which were extended to simulate a landing upon touchdown, and the test used more powerful gaseous Nitrogen control thrusters to control the aerodynamic-induced rotation that had occurred on the first test flight. The first stage successfully approached the water surface with no spin and at zero vertical velocity, as designed.

During the second test, the first stage was traveling at a velocity of Mach 10 (10,200 km/h; 6,320 mph) at an altitude of 80 kilometers (260,000 ft) at the time of the high-altitude turn-around maneuver, followed by ignition of three of the nine main engines for the initial deceleration and placement onto its descent trajectory. The "first stage executed a good re-entry burn and was able to stabilize itself on the way down. ... [The] landing in [the] Atlantic [ocean] was good! ... Flight computers continued transmitting [telemetry data] for eight seconds after reaching the water" and stopped only after the first stage went horizontal.

The major modifications for the second first stage controlled-descent test flight included changes to both the reentry burn and the landing burn as well as adding increased attitude control system (ACS) capabilities.

SpaceX had projected a low probability of stage recovery following the flight test due to complexity of the test sequence and the large number of steps that would need to be performed. The company was careful to label the entire flight test as "an experiment". In a press conference at the National Press Club on April 25, Elon Musk said that the first stage achieved a soft touchdown on the ocean but due to rough seas, the stage was destroyed.

==== Flight 10 ====
The third test flight of a returned first stage was July 14, 2014, on Falcon 9 flight 10. Whereas the previous test reached a target landing area some hundreds of kilometers off the Florida coast, this flight aimed for a boost-back trajectory that would attempt the ocean touchdown much nearer the coast, and closer to the original launch location at Cape Canaveral. Following the third controlled-descent test flight, SpaceX expressed confidence in their ability to successfully land in the future on a "floating launch pad or back at the launch site and refly the rocket with no required refurbishment."

Following the first stage loft of the second stage and payload on its orbital trajectory, SpaceX conducted a successful flight test on the spent first stage. The first stage successfully decelerated from hypersonic speed in the upper atmosphere, made a successful reentry, landing burn, and deployment of its landing legs, and touched down on the ocean surface. The first stage was not recovered for analysis as the hull integrity was breached, either upon touchdown or on the subsequent "tip over and body slam". Results of the post-landing analysis showed that the hull integrity was lost as the 46-metre (150 ft)-tall first stage fell horizontally, as planned, onto the ocean surface following the landing.

==== Flight 13 ====
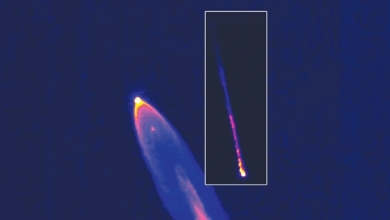
Infrared thermal imagery of Falcon 9 SpaceX CRS-4 launch. The larger image was captured shortly after second stage separation from the first stage: the top of the first stage appears as a dim dot below the larger plume. In the inset, the restarted first stage engines power the stage.

The fourth test flight of a returned first stage, with a planned ocean touchdown, occurred on Falcon 9 flight 13 which was launched on September 21, 2014. The first stage flew a profile approaching a zero-velocity at zero-altitude simulated landing on the sea surface. SpaceX made no attempt to recover the first stage, since earlier tests had confirmed that the 14-story tall first stage would not survive the tip-over event into the sea. The booster did run out of liquid oxygen.

One month later, detailed thermal imaging infrared sensor data and video were released of the controlled-descent test. The data was collected by NASA in a joint arrangement with SpaceX as part of research on retropropulsive deceleration technologies in order to develop new approaches to Mars atmospheric entry. A key problem with propulsive techniques is handling the fluid flow problems and attitude control of the descent vehicle during the supersonic retropropulsion phase of the entry and deceleration. All phases of the night-time flight test on the first stage were successfully imaged except for the final landing burn, as that occurred below the clouds where the IR data was not visible. The research team is particularly interested in the 70–40-kilometer (43–25 mi) altitude range of the SpaceX "reentry burn" on the Falcon 9 Earth-entry tests as this is the "powered flight through the Mars-relevant retropulsion regime" that models Mars entry and descent conditions.

==== Flight 15 ====
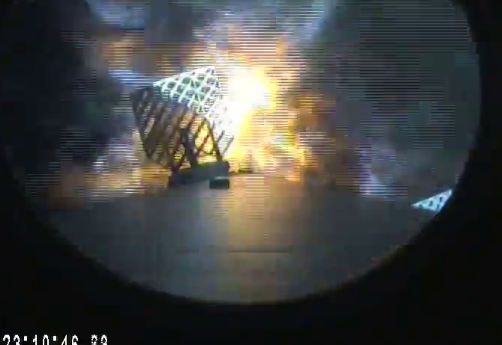
Falcon 9 flight 15 first stage re-entry with grid fins; onboard camera view

SpaceX had planned to make the sixth controlled-descent test flight and second landing attempt on their drone ship no earlier than February 11, 2015. Landing a returning rocket at sea would have been a "potentially historic rocket launch and landing", as such a feat "was unheard of" five years earlier.

According to regulatory paperwork filed in 2014, SpaceX plans called for the sixth test flight to occur on a late January 2015 launch attempt. However, after the completion of the fifth test flight, and with some damage being incurred by the drone ship in the botched landing, it was not clear whether the sixth test would still be feasible only a few weeks later. This issue was resolved within days of the ship's return to Jacksonville, and by January 15, SpaceX was unambiguous about its plans to attempt a landing of the first stage following the boost phase of the Deep Space Climate Observatory mission.

However, in a statement by SpaceX, the drone ship was in conditions "with waves reaching up to three stories in height crashing over the decks". Additionally, one of the four thrusters that keep the barge in a constant position had malfunctioned, making station-keeping difficult. For these reasons, the post-launch flight test did not involve the barge, but instead attempted a soft touchdown over water.

The test was successful, and the first stage of the Falcon 9 landed "nicely vertical" with an accuracy of 10 meters from the target location in the ocean.

Therefore, this test represented the fifth ocean touchdown, and the sixth overall Falcon 9 first stage controlled-descent test.

==== Flight 46 and 48 ====
Flight 46 and 48 were both boosters on their second flight that were not recovered due to the older Block 3 design only being capable of two flights. Instead of having an uncontrolled descent, SpaceX softly landed both boosters in the water to test high energy landing techniques without the risk of damaging a drone ship. On flight 48, the booster survived landing and stayed intact after tipping over. Unplanned recovery was discussed but the booster broke up before it could be attempted.

=== Landing attempts ===
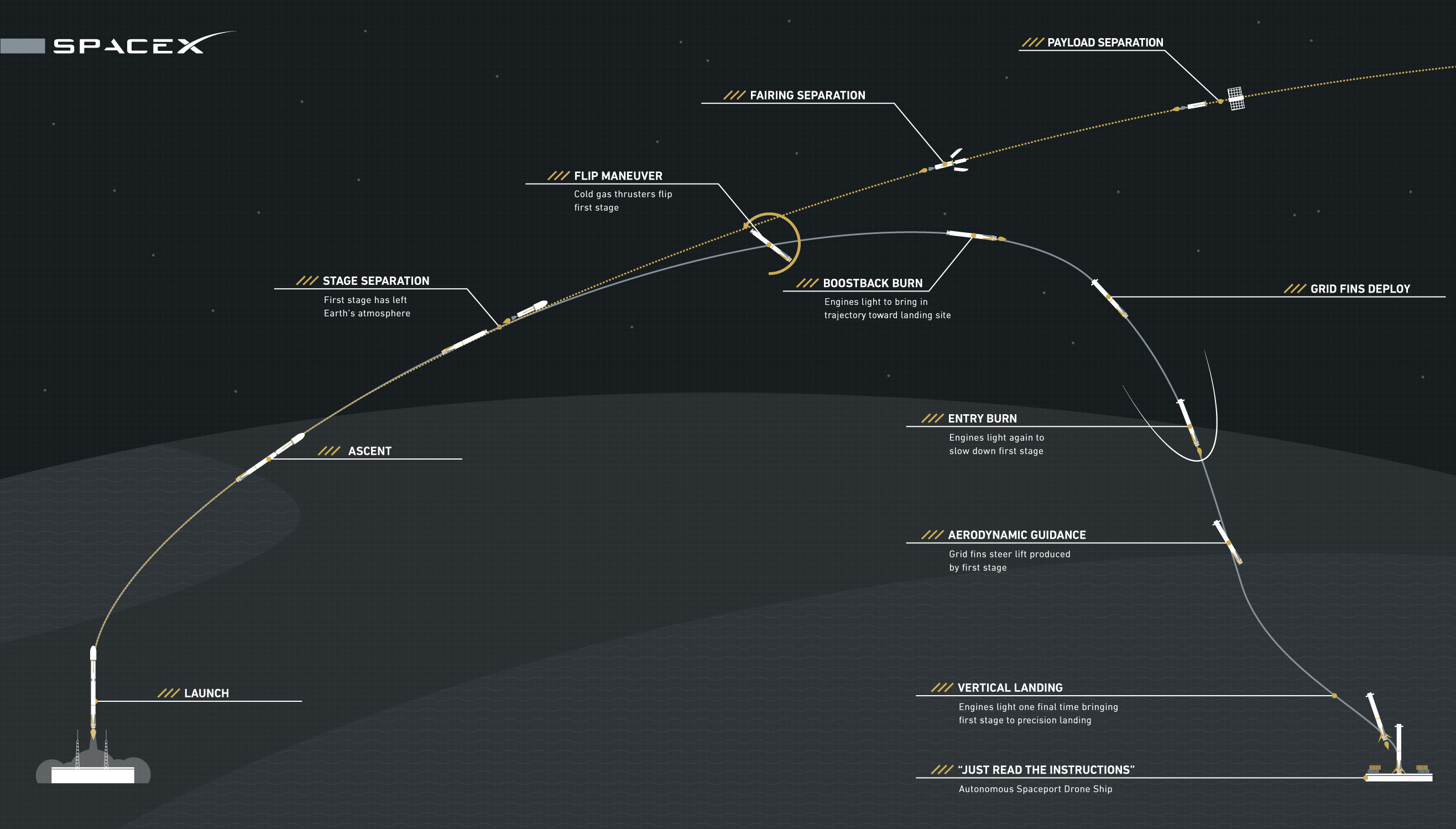
Depiction of Falcon 9 landing trajectory in floating-platform recovery tests

As of 28 January 2023, SpaceX has attempted 178 landings of a first stage on a solid surface, 167 of which have succeeded (93.8%), with 139 out of 144 (96.5%) for the Falcon 9 Block 5 version.

In July 2014, SpaceX announced that the fifth and sixth controlled-descent test flights would attempt to land on a solid surface, merging the lessons from the high-altitude envelope expansion of the first four controlled-descent flights over water with the low-altitude lessons of the F9R Dev1 testing in Texas. At that time, the "solid surface" was not further described, and was later revealed to be a seafaring barge dubbed an autonomous spaceport drone ship.

Many of the test objectives were achieved on the first attempt, including bringing the stage to the specific location of the floating platform and collecting a large amount of test data with the first use of grid fin control surfaces for more precise reentry positioning. However the touchdown on the corner of the barge was a hard landing and most of the rocket body fell into the ocean and sank; SpaceX published a short clip of the crash. It would take four more attempts to achieve the first barge landing at sea on flight 23. Meanwhile, ground landing succeeded on the first attempt with flight 20 on December 21, 2015.

In October 2014, SpaceX clarified that the "solid surface" would be a floating platform constructed from a barge in Louisiana, and confirmed that they would attempt to land the first stage of the fourteenth Falcon 9 flight on the platform. For the landing to succeed, the 18 m (60 ft)-wide span of the rocket landing legs must not only land within the 52 m (170 ft)-wide barge deck, but would need to also deal with ocean swell and GPS errors. In late November, SpaceX revealed that the landing barge would be capable of autonomous operation and would not need to be anchored or moored; it was hence called an autonomous spaceport drone ship. As of January 2015 three of these ships had been built, two of which were operational.

==== Flight 14 ====
This fifth controlled-descent test flight was anticipated by the specialized press as a historic core return attempt. It incorporated for the first time in an orbital mission the grid fin aerodynamic control surfaces that had previously been tested only during a low-altitude, low-speed test with the F9R Dev1 prototype vehicle in early 2014. The addition of grid fins, with continuation of the control authority obtained from gimbaling the engines as on previous test flights, was projected to improve the landing accuracy to 10 m (33 ft), a thousand-fold improvement over the four previous test flights which landed within 10 km (6.2 mi) of their target coordinates. Prior to the flight, SpaceX projected that the likelihood of success on the first try was 50 percent or less.

The first test flight for this new hardware occurred on January 10, 2015, on the CRS-5 mission for NASA. The controlled-descent flight started approximately three minutes after launch, following the second stage separation event, when the first stage was approximately 80 km (50 mi) high and moving at a velocity of Mach 10 (10,000 km/h; 6,300 mph).

The SpaceX webcast indicated that the boostback burn and reentry burns for the descending first stage occurred, and that the descending rocket then went "below the horizon," as expected, which eliminated the live telemetry signal, so that the retropropulsive landing attempt was not shown live. Shortly thereafter, SpaceX released information that the rocket did get to the drone ship as planned, but "landed hard ... Ship itself is fine. Some of the support equipment on the deck will need to be replaced." Musk later elaborated that the rocket's flight-control surfaces had exhausted their supply of hydraulic fluid prior to impact. Musk posted photos of the impact while talking to John Carmack on Twitter. SpaceX later released a video of the impact on Vine.

==== Flight 17 ====
A seventh test flight of the first stage controlled-descent profile occurred on April 14, 2015, on Falcon 9 flight 17, which carried CRS-6 to the International Space Station. This was SpaceX's second attempt to land on a floating platform. The first stage was fitted with grid fins and landing legs to facilitate the post-mission test.

An early report from Elon Musk suggested that the first stage made a hard landing on the drone ship. Musk later clarified that the bipropellant valve was stuck, and therefore the control system could not react rapidly enough for a successful landing. On April 15, SpaceX released a video of the terminal phase of the descent, the landing, the tip over, and the resulting deflagration as the stage broke up on the deck of the ASDS.

==== Flight 20: first landing on ground pad ====
The first attempt to land the first stage of Falcon 9 on a ground pad near the launch site occurred on flight 20, the maiden flight of the Falcon 9 Full Thrust version, on the evening of December 21, 2015. The landing was successful and the first stage was recovered. This was the first time in history that a rocket first stage returned to Earth after propelling an orbital launch mission and achieved a controlled vertical landing.

SpaceX applied to the Federal Aviation Administration (FAA) US regulatory authority to perform its eighth booster controlled-descent test culminating with a landing attempt at the Landing Zone 1 facility (formerly Launch Complex 13) that SpaceX had recently built at Cape Canaveral Air Force Station. The FAA cleared SpaceX to attempt this landing after assessing that it would inflict minimal damage on the environment. Additionally, NASA planned to close the NASA Causeway near the launch and landing site and significantly increase the size of exclusion zones during the launch and landing attempt. Both options to attempt landing on the ground pad or on the drone ship at sea remained open until the day of the launch. The final decision to return the booster to Cape Canaveral was made based on a number of factors, including weather at the potential landing sites.

Flight 20 took off at 20:29 EST on December 21, 2015 (01:29 UTC on December 22, 2015). About 9 minutes and 45 seconds later, the first stage landed vertically on the pad.

SpaceX did not fly the Falcon 9 flight 20 first stage again. Rather, the rocket was inspected and moved back to the launch pad a few miles north to perform a static fire test. After the hot fire test, the vehicle was evaluated in detail by SpaceX to assess capabilities for reflight of the launch vehicle design after future landings.

On December 31, SpaceX announced that no damage had been found on the stage and that it was ready to fire again. On January 15, 2016, SpaceX conducted the static fire test on the recovered booster and reported a good overall outcome, except for some thrust fluctuations in one of the outer engines (engine 9). Elon Musk reported that this may have been due to debris ingestion.

This booster has been on display outside of SpaceX headquarters in Hawthorne, California since August 20, 2016.

==== Flight 21 ====
Flight 21, the final launch of a Falcon 9 v1.1, carried the Jason 3 payload. At one point this was the first possible opportunity for an attempt to land the first stage on land, but the launches were reordered following the loss of Falcon 9 flight 19 in June 2015. Jason-3 was successfully launched on January 17, 2016, and while the first stage managed to slow down towards a soft landing, the lockout collet on one of the landing legs did not latch correctly, which caused the rocket to fall over and explode after touching down. Elon Musk noted that ice buildup on the collet from the high-humidity launch conditions may have led to the failure of the latch.

==== Flight 22 ====
On March 4, 2016, Falcon 9 flight 22 launched the 5,271 kg (11,620 lb) heavy SES-9 communications satellite, the rocket's largest payload yet targeting a highly-energetic geosynchronous transfer orbit (GTO). Consequently, the Falcon 9 first stage followed a ballistic trajectory after separation and re-entered the atmosphere at high velocity with very little fuel to mitigate potential aerodynamic damage.

Therefore, SpaceX did not expect to successfully land its Falcon 9 booster on its sea barge, the Of Course I Still Love You, positioned in the Atlantic Ocean. Elon Musk confirmed in a tweet that the landing attempt had failed.

==== Flight 23: first landing on a drone ship ====
On April 8, 2016, Falcon 9 flight 23, the third flight of the full-thrust version, delivered the SpaceX CRS-8 cargo on its way to the International Space Station while the first stage conducted a boostback and re-entry maneuver over the Atlantic Ocean. Nine minutes after liftoff, the booster landed vertically on the drone ship Of Course I Still Love You, 300 km (190 mi) from the Florida coastline, achieving a long-sought-after milestone for the SpaceX reusability development program.

This stage, serial number B1021, was refurbished and flown again in March 2017 for the SES-10 mission, setting another milestone in the development of reusable rockets.

==== Flight 24: first return from GTO mission ====
On May 6, 2016, Falcon 9 flight 24 delivered the JCSAT-14 satellite on a geostationary transfer orbit (GTO) while the first stage conducted a re-entry burn under ballistic conditions without prior boostback. Following the controlled descent through the atmosphere, the booster executed a short landing burn as it approached the drone ship Of Course I Still Love You, and succeeded in landing vertically. This second landing at sea was more difficult than the previous one because the booster at separation was traveling about 8,350 km/h (5,190 mph) compared to 6,650 km/h (4,130 mph) on the CRS-8 launch to low Earth orbit. Pursuing their experiments to test the limits of the flight envelope, SpaceX opted for a shorter landing burn with three engines instead of the single-engine burns seen in earlier attempts; this approach consumes less fuel by leaving the stage in free fall as long as possible and decelerating more sharply, thereby minimizing the amount of energy expended to counter gravity. Elon Musk indicated this first stage may not be flown again and will instead be used as a life leader for ground tests to confirm future first stage rockets are good.

==== Flight 25 ====
On May 27, 2016, Falcon 9 flight 25 delivered THAICOM 8 to a supersynchronous transfer orbit; despite high re-entry speed, the first stage again landed successfully on the SpaceX drone ship. The landing crushed a "crush core" in one leg, leading to a notable tilt to the stage as it stood on the drone ship.

==== Flight 26 ====
On June 15, 2016, Falcon 9 flight 26 successfully delivered the Eutelsat 117W B and ABS 2A satellites into GTO. The first stage conducted a re-entry burn and successfully deployed its grid fins, before attempting a landing on the barge. The landing failed in its final moments due to low thrust on one of the first stage engines, caused by the exhaustion of its liquid oxygen fuel supply. That caused the engines to shut down early while the first stage was just above the drone's deck, causing a landing failure.

==== Flight 27 ====
In the early hours of July 18, 2016, Falcon 9 flight 27, carrying the Dragon spacecraft for the CRS-9 mission was followed by a successful landing of the first stage at Landing Zone 1, Cape Canaveral.

==== Flight 28 ====
On August 14, 2016, the Falcon 9 flight 28 successfully propelled the Japanese JCSAT-16 telecommunications satellite to a geosynchronous transfer orbit. The first stage re-entered the atmosphere and landed vertically on the Of Course I Still Love You drone ship that was located in the Atlantic Ocean.

== Transition to routine reuse ==
SpaceX continued to return a number of first stages in both ground and sea landings to clarify the procedures needed to re-use flown boosters. The company had hoped to begin offering pre-flown Falcon 9 rocket stages commercially by the end of 2016, but the first re-used booster eventually took off on March 30, 2017, with the SES-10 mission. The booster performed well and was recovered a second time.

In January 2016, Musk evaluated the likelihood of success to approximately 70 percent for landing attempts in 2016, hopefully rising to 90 percent in 2017; he also cautioned that the company expected "a few more RUDs", referring to the term Rapid Unscheduled Disassembly, a humorous euphemism for destruction of the vehicle. Musk's prediction were close to the actual numbers, as five out of eight flown boosters (63%) were recovered in 2016, and 14 out of 14 (100%) in 2017. Three GTO missions for heavy payloads were flown in an expendable configuration, not equipped for landing. Five boosters were flown a second time in 2017, marking the beginning of routine reuse of boosters. In 2018 and 2019, more than half of the missions were flown with reused boosters, by 2021 over 90% of the flights reused boosters from previous flights.

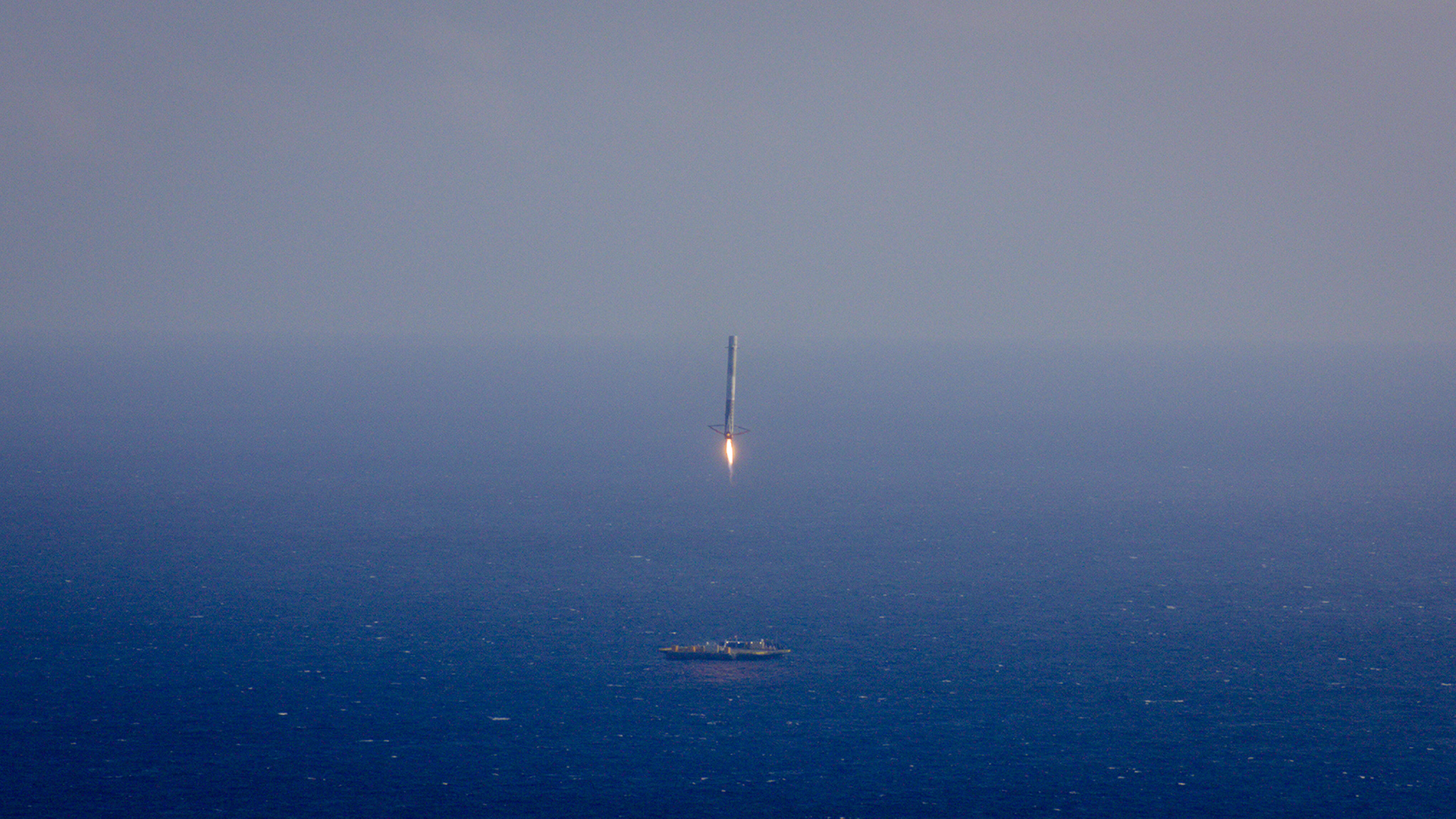
Falcon 9 first-stage attempts landing on the Autonomous spaceport drone ship, the landing legs are in the midst of deploying

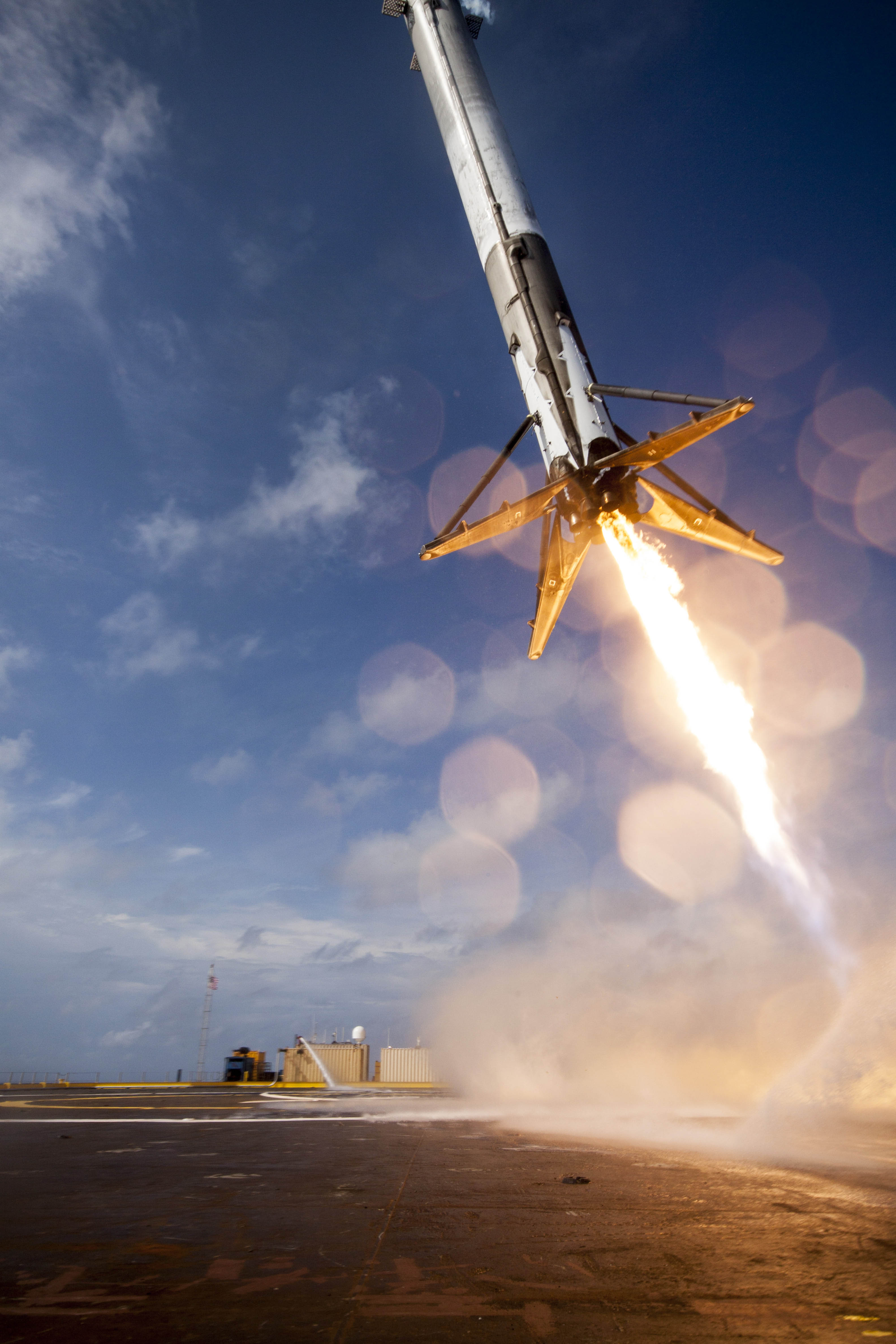
Falcon 9 Flight 17's first-stage attempting a controlled landing on the drone ship following the successful launch of CRS-6

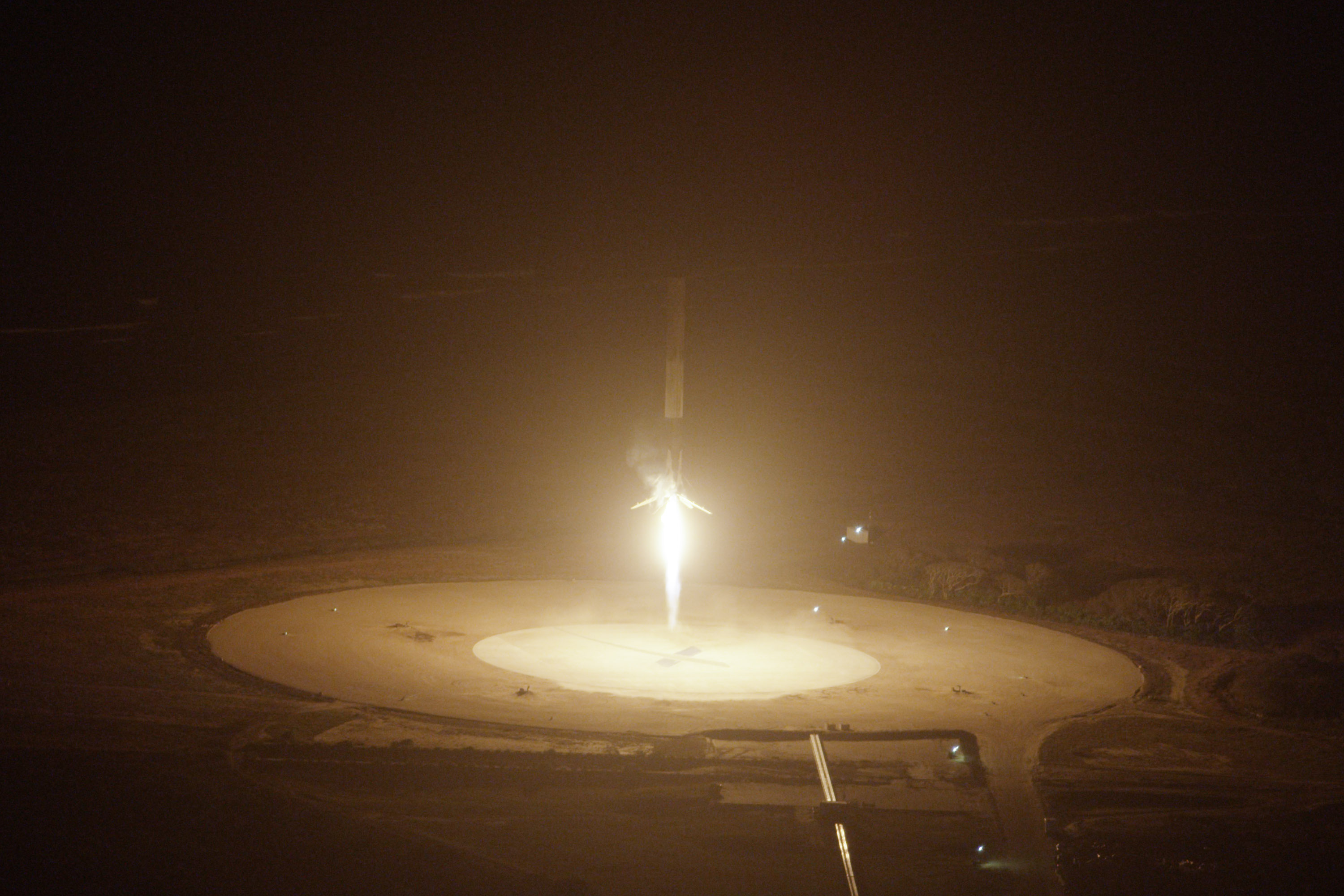
Falcon 9 flight 20's first-stage moments before touchdown on Landing Zone 1

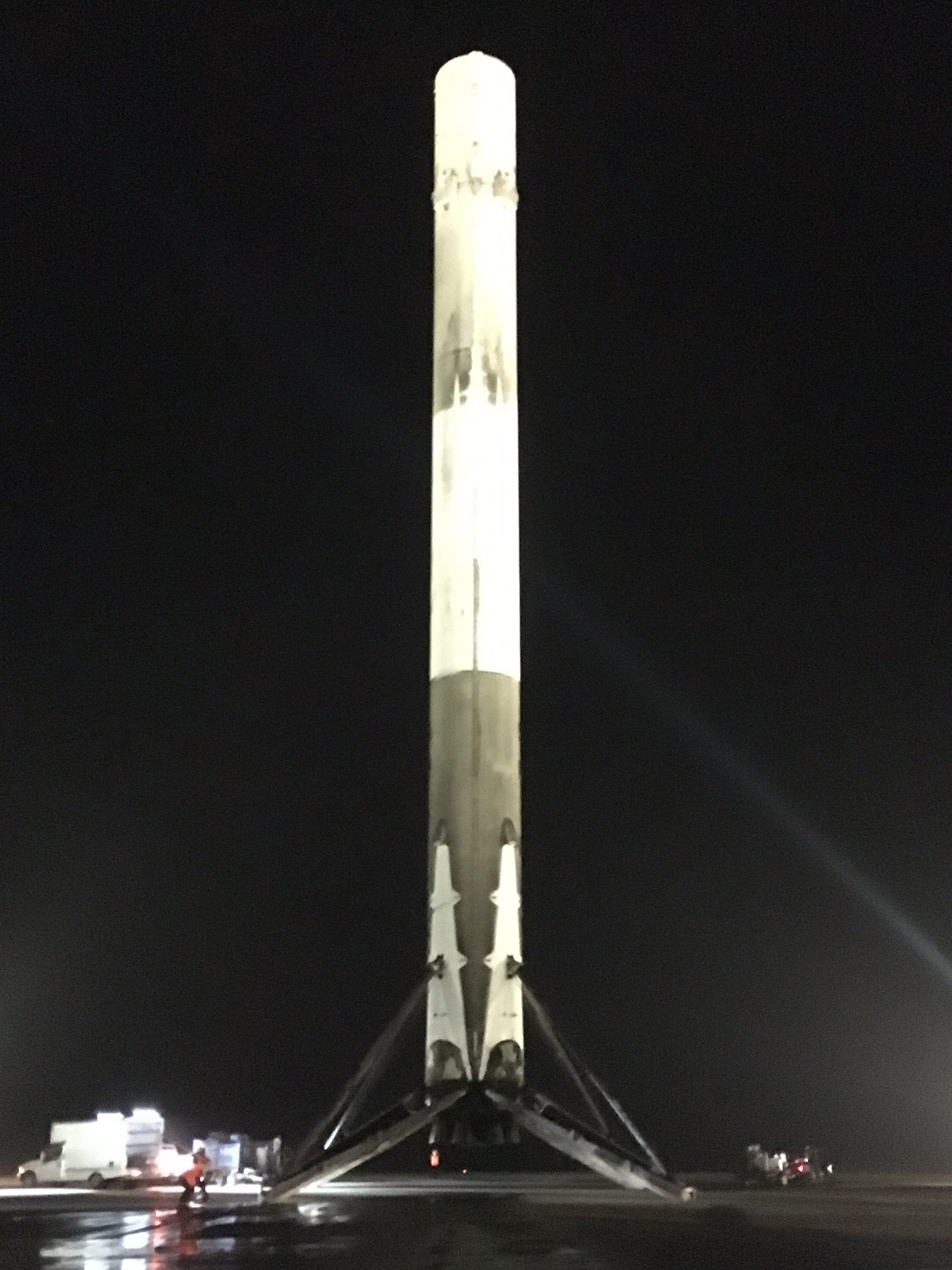
Falcon 9 flight 20's first-stage after landing

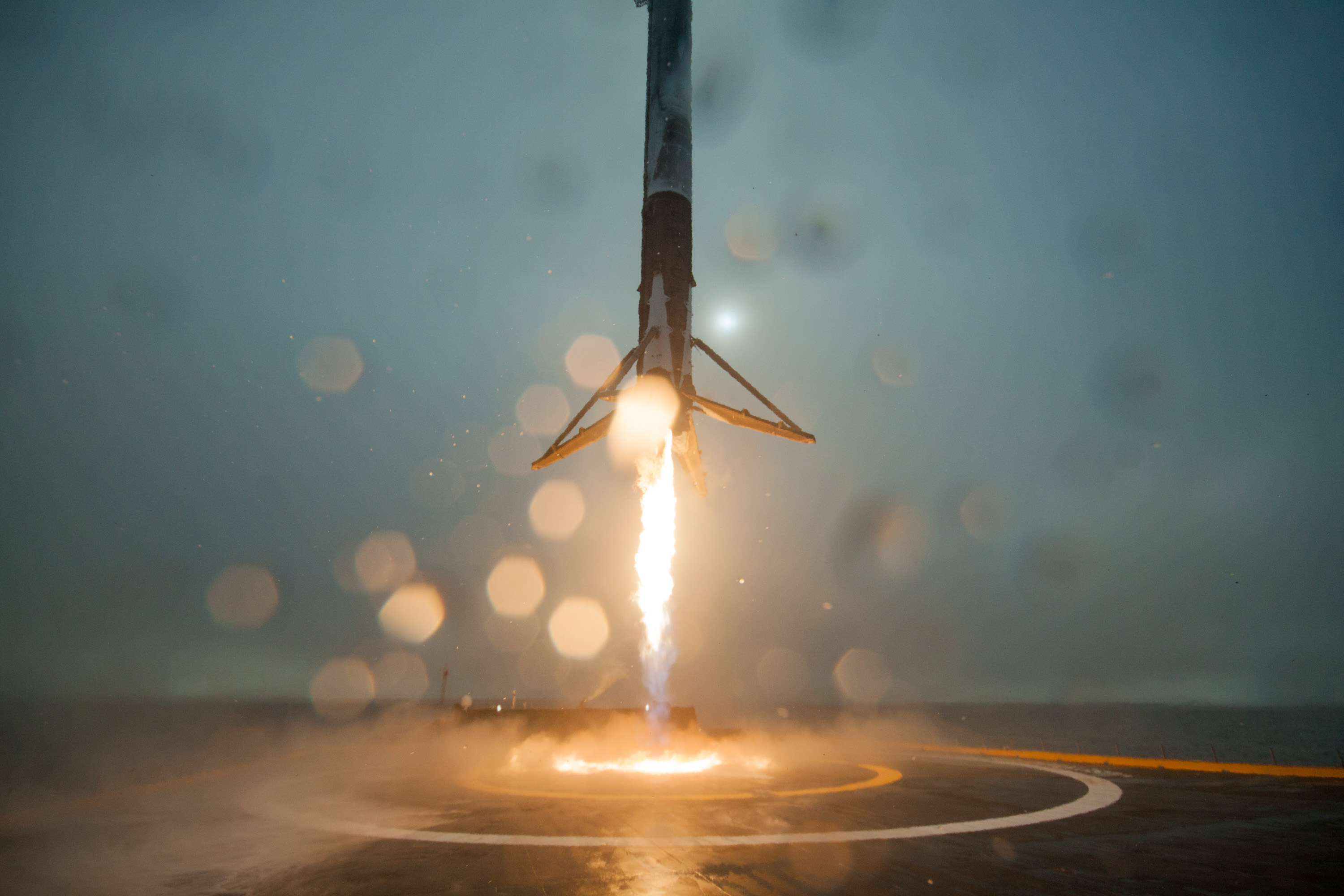
Falcon 9 flight 21's landing approach before it soft-landed and tipped over due to a leg lock failure

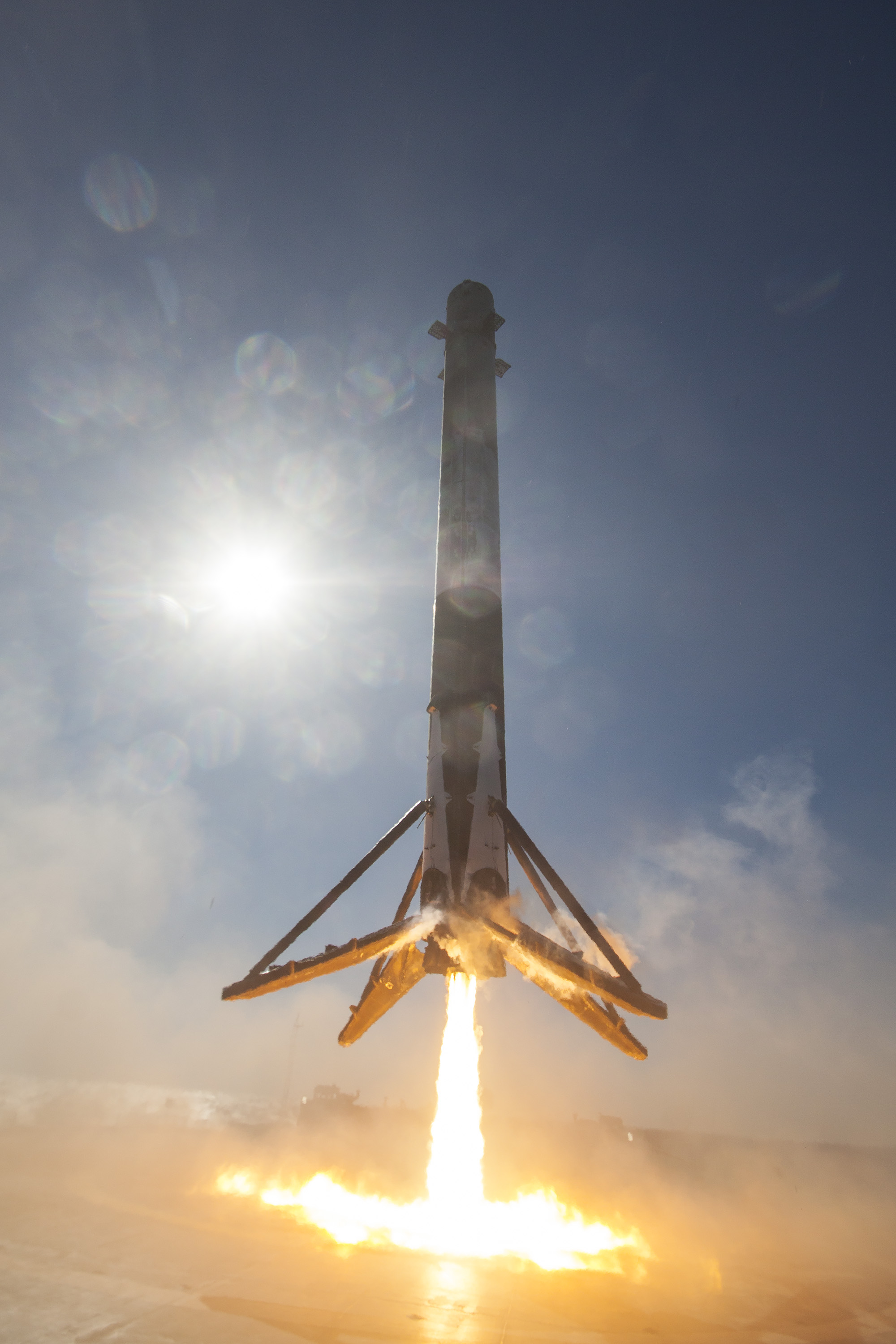
Falcon 9 flight 23's first-stage was the first successful landing on the drone ship

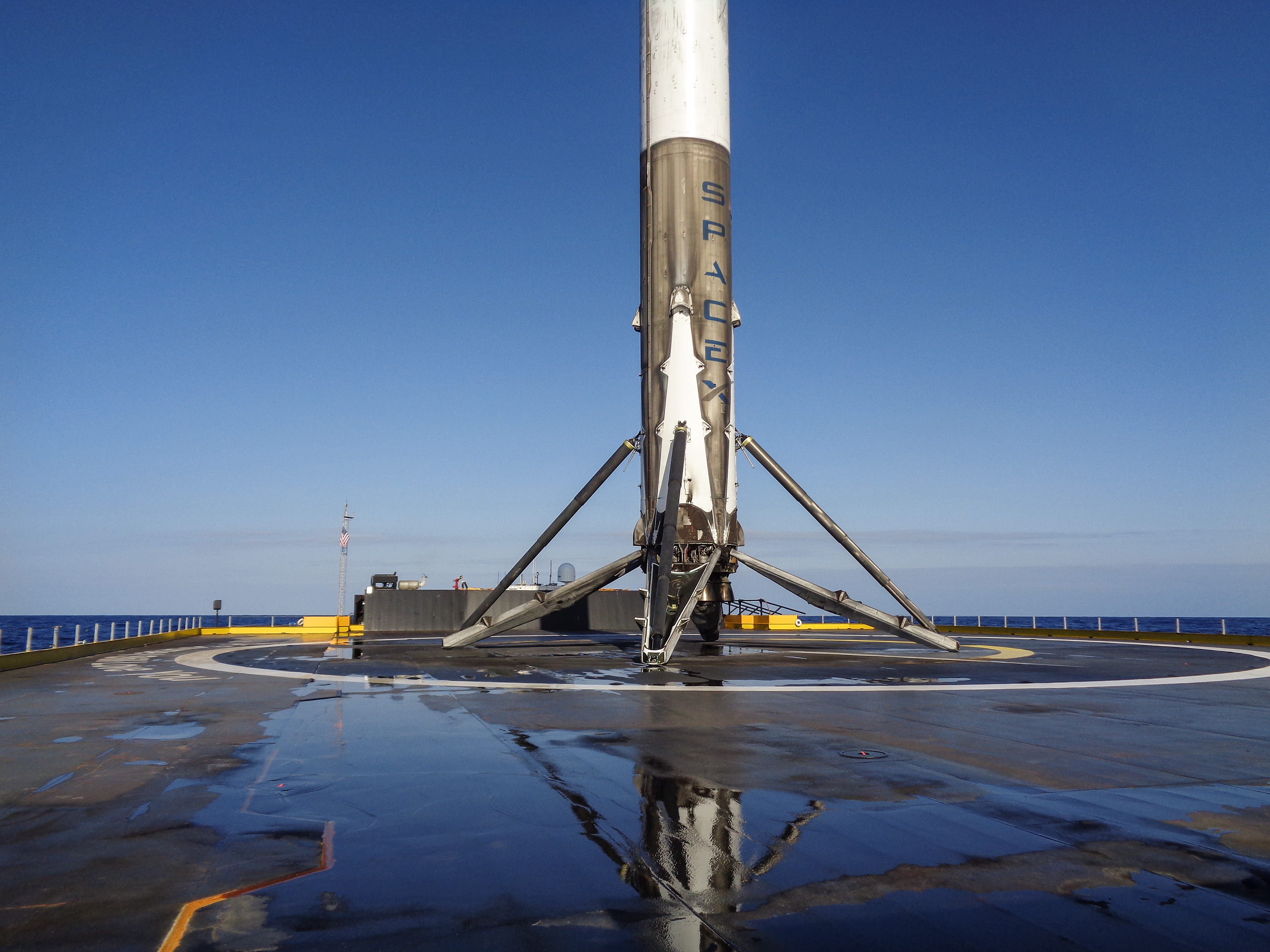
Falcon 9 flight 24's first stage on the drone ship

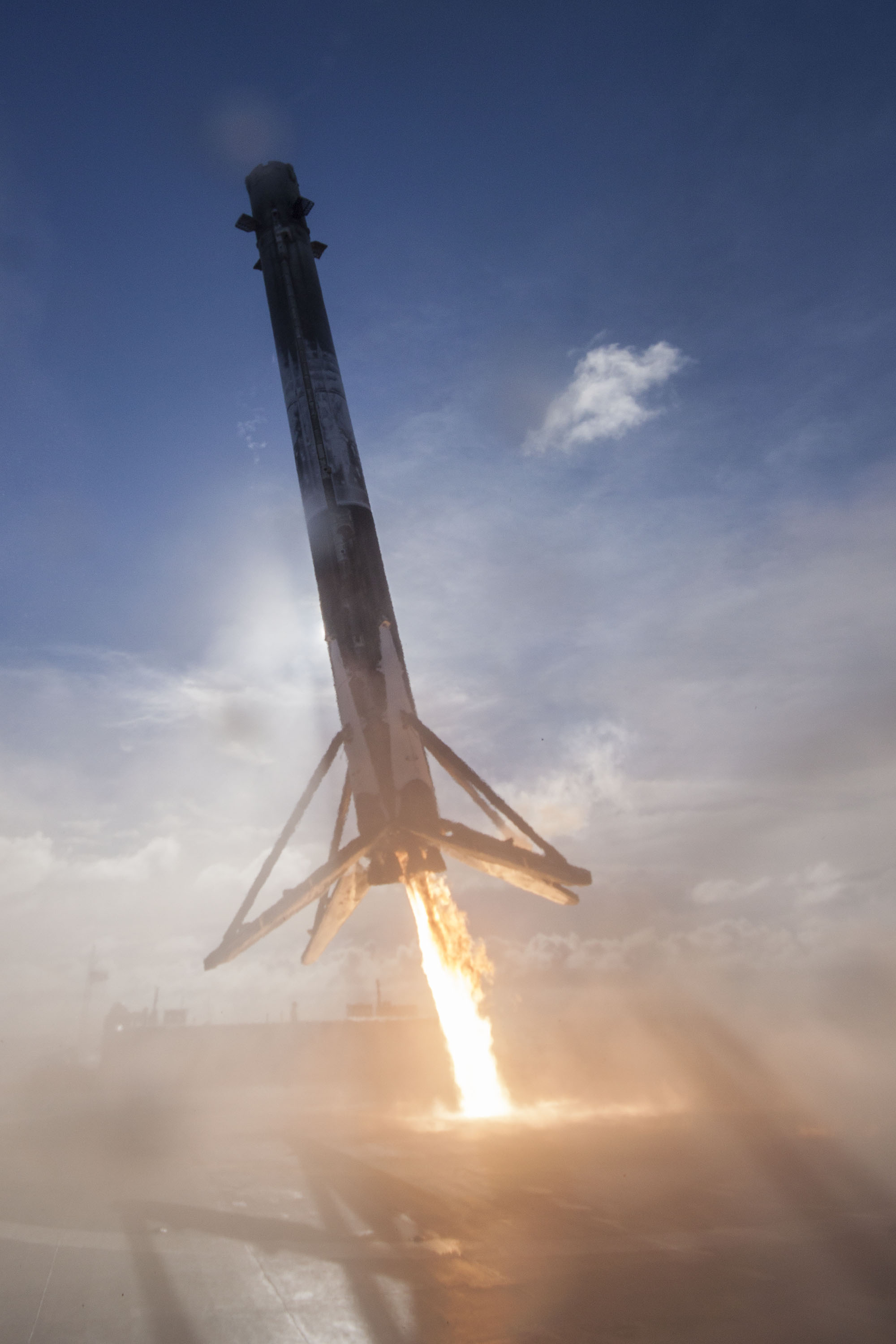
Falcon 9 flight 25 first-stage approached the drone ship with a tilt

== See also ==
- SpaceX reusable launch system development program
- List of Falcon 9 and Falcon Heavy launches
- List of Falcon 9 first-stage boosters
