= SpaceX CRS-3 =

2014 American resupply spaceflight to the ISS

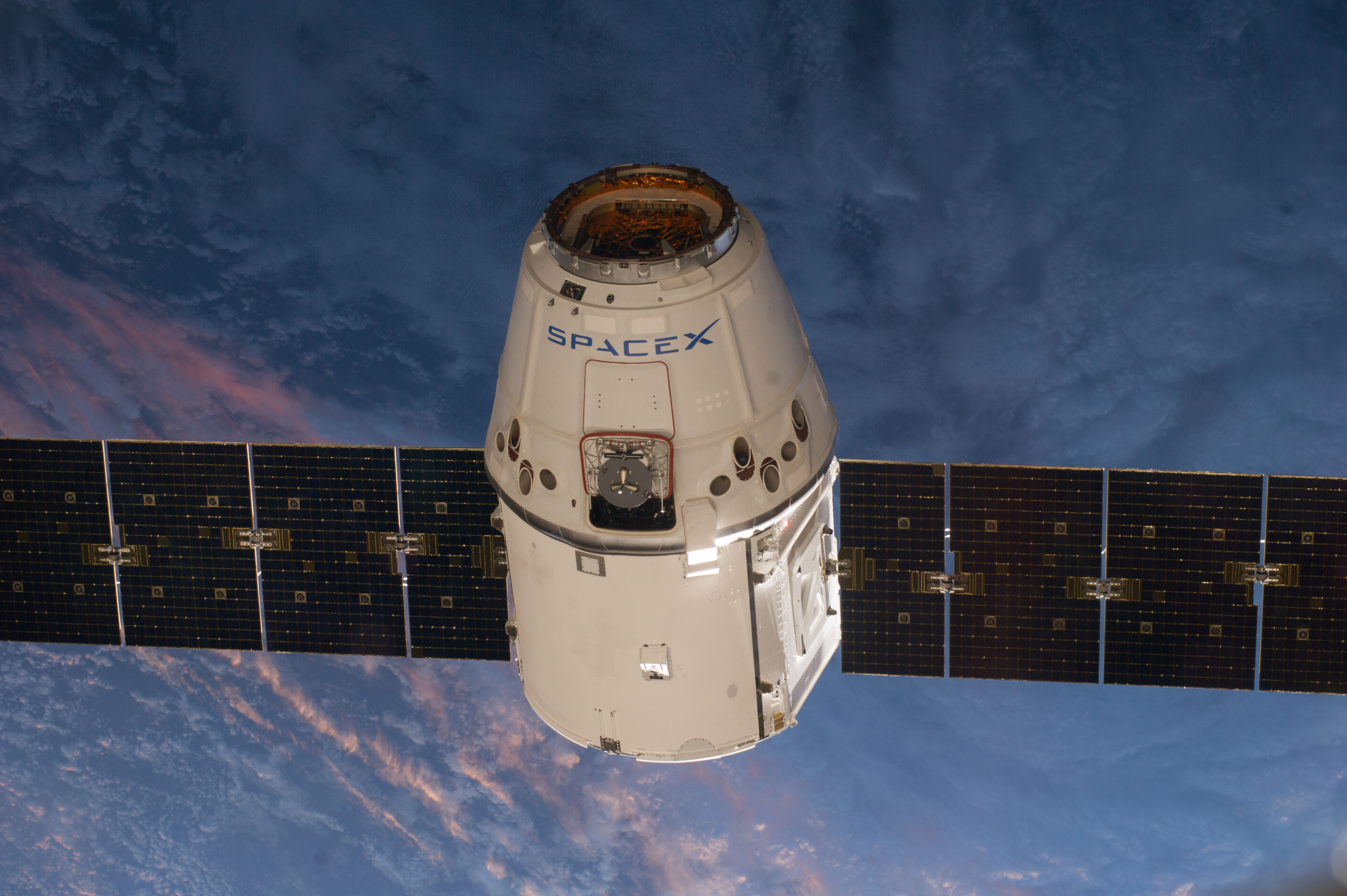
- SpaceX CRS-3 Dragon spacecraft approaching ISS on 20 April 2014
- Names: SpX-3
- Mission type: ISS resupply
- Operator: SpaceX
- COSPAR ID: 2014-022A
- SATCAT no.: 39680
- Mission duration: 29 days, 23 hours, 38 minutes

Spacecraft properties
- Spacecraft: Dragon 1 C105
- Spacecraft type: Dragon 1
- Manufacturer: SpaceX
- Launch mass: 6,000 kg (13,000 lb)
- Dimensions: Height: 8.1 m (27 ft); Diameter: 4 m (13 ft)

Start of mission
- Launch date: 18 April 2014, 19:25:21 UTC
- Rocket: Falcon 9 v1.1 (B1006)
- Launch site: Cape Canaveral, SLC-40

End of mission
- Disposal: Recovered
- Landing date: 18 May 2014, 19:05 UTC
- Landing site: Pacific Ocean

Orbital parameters
- Reference system: Geocentric orbit
- Regime: Low Earth orbit
- Inclination: 51.65°

Berthing at International Space Station
- Berthing port: Harmony nadir
- RMS capture: 20 April 2014, 11:14 UTC
- Berthing date: 20 April 2014, 14:06 UTC
- Unberthing date: 18 May 2014, 11:55 UTC
- RMS release: 18 May 2014, 13:26 UTC
- Time berthed: 27 days, 21 hours, 49 minutes

Cargo
- Mass: 2,089 kg (4,605 lb)
- Pressurised: 1,518 kg (3,347 lb)
- Unpressurised: 571 kg (1,259 lb)
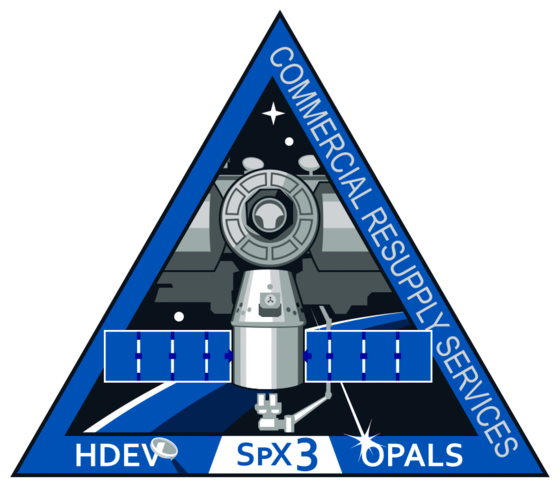
- NASA SpX-3 mission patch Commercial Resupply Services Cargo Dragon

SpaceX CRS-3, also known as SpX-3, was a Commercial Resupply Service mission to the International Space Station (ISS), contracted to NASA, which was launched on 18 April 2014. It was the fifth flight for SpaceX's uncrewed Dragon cargo spacecraft and the third SpaceX operational mission contracted to NASA under a Commercial Resupply Services (CRS-1) contract.

This was the first launch of a Dragon capsule on the Falcon 9 v1.1 launch vehicle, as previous launches used the smaller v1.0 configuration. It was also the first time the F9 v1.1 has flown without a payload fairing, and the first experimental flight test of an ocean landing of the first stage on a NASA/Dragon mission.

The Falcon 9 with CRS-3 on board launched on time at 19:25 UTC on 18 April 2014, and was grappled on 20 April at 11:14 UTC by Expedition 39 commander Koichi Wakata. The spacecraft was berthed to the ISS from 14:06 UTC on that day to 11:55 UTC on 18 May 2014. CRS-3 then successfully de-orbited and splashed down in the Pacific Ocean off the coast of California at 19:05 UTC on 18 May 2014.

== Launch schedule history ==
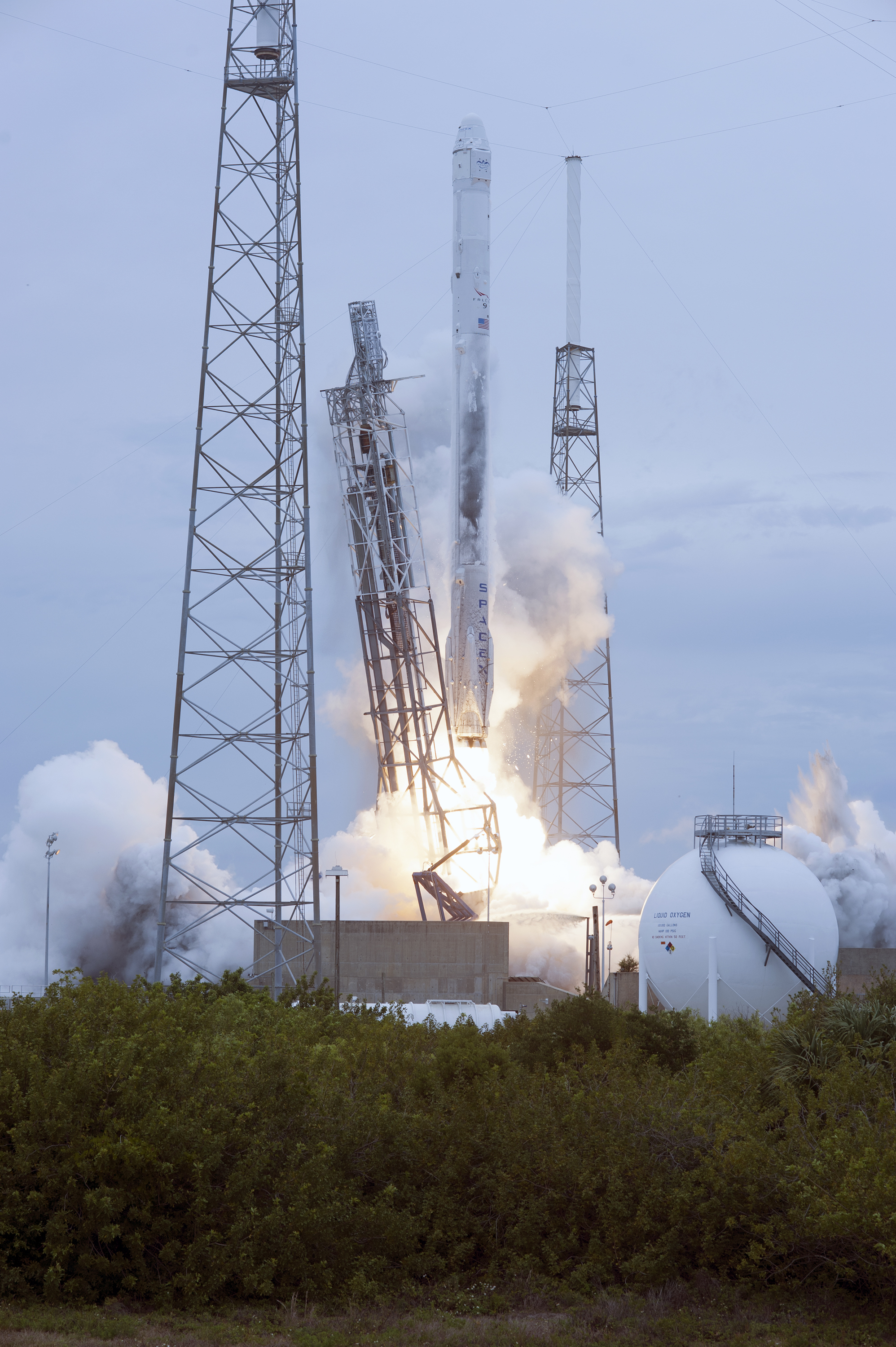
Launch of SpaceX CRS-3 from Cape Canaveral on 18 April 2014.

The launch was notionally scheduled by NASA, as of November 2012, to be no earlier than 30 September 2013, with berthing to the station occurring three days later on 2 October 2013. By March 2013, the launch was scheduled by NASA for no earlier than 28 November 2013, with berthing to the station occurring three days later on 1 December 2013. By August 2013, the launch date had been moved to no earlier than 15 January 2014, but by October 2013 it was moved to 11 February 2014. As of 23 January 2014, the launch was rescheduled again to 1 March 2014, and then rescheduled to 16 March 2014 in early February 2014. The several delays — from the nominal December 2013 date that had been in place since early 2013 — have been mostly due to limited berthing windows in the ISS Visiting Vehicle schedule, and delays to both Orbital Sciences Corporation's Cygnus and SpaceX's Dragon resulted from the December 2013 cooling issue on the ISS which required several spacewalks to mitigate.

On 12 March 2014, the launch was rescheduled to 30 March or 2 April 2014, for a variety of reasons including data buffering issues, working some issues with the Eastern Range, some operational issues with the new Dragon design, and some contamination of the impact shielding blanket. SpaceX ultimately decided to move forward and use the shielding blanket with the minor contamination problems, believing it would not impact the optical payloads being carried in the Dragon trunk. On 26 March 2014, a further delay was announced related to a fire at one of the radar facilities on the Eastern Range. There is mandatory radar coverage for any launches from Cape Canaveral, and the fire forced a delay until that section of the launch trajectory could be covered, possibly by alternative means that would have telemetry communication capability to the Air Force facility responsible for launch safety.

By 4 April 2014, the Eastern Range radars were repaired and back online to support launches, and the CRS-3 launch was slated for no earlier than 14 April 2014 with a backup date of 18 April 2014, contingent upon a United Launch Alliance (ULA) Atlas V flight scheduled for as early as 10 April 2014. On 11 April 2014, the International Space Station (ISS) suffered a failure of an external computer known as a Multiplexer/Demultiplexer (MDM), which required a spacewalk on 22 April 2014 to replace in order to restore vital redundancy to the station. Despite the challenges, the CRS-3 mission – which could have been impacted by the MDM failure – was still on for 14 April 2014, with ISS berthing scheduled to take place two days later on 16 April 2014. However, during the launch attempt on 14 April 2014, a primary helium supply valve used in the stage separation system failed a pre-launch diagnostic test approximately one hour prior to the scheduled launch, so the SpaceX launch manager scrubbed the mission. In ground tests following the scrub, the redundant backup helium supply valve tested okay so the mission would likely have succeeded; however, it is SpaceX policy to not launch with any known anomalies.

The launch was immediately rescheduled for no earlier than the backup date, 18 April 2014. That date was confirmed two days later, following replacement of the defective valve, but also noted that weather constraints may prevent the launch on 18 April 2014 from occurring at the instantaneous launch window of 19:25 UTC. If that launch had been scrubbed, the next launch window would have been 19 April 2014 at 19:02 UTC.

On 18 April 2014 at 19:25:21 UTC, the vehicle was successfully launched. Hours prior to the launch, a liquid oxygen leak in the ground support equipment was detected; SpaceX engineers applied water from the fire suppression system, which froze on contact with the liquid oxygen and plugged the leak. Excess water pooled in the flame trench and dramatically surged upwards as the engines ignited, covering the rocket with grime and soot. Despite the unusual event, the rocket was unlikely to have been in any danger.

== Primary payload and downmass ==
NASA has contracted for the CRS-3 mission from SpaceX and therefore determines the primary payload, date/time of launch, and orbital parameters for the Dragon space capsule.

Among other NASA cargo, including repair parts for the ISS, the SpaceX CRS-3 mission carried a large number of experiments to the space station, including:

- High Definition Earth Viewing cameras (HDEV) – four commercial HD video cameras which will film the Earth from multiple different angles from the vantage. The experiment will help NASA determine what cameras work best in the harsh environment of space
- Optical Payload for Lasercomm Science (OPALS) will demonstrate high-bandwidth space to ground laser communications
- T-Cell Activation in Space (TCAS) – studying how "deficiencies in the human immune system are affected by a microgravity environment"
- Vegetable Production System (Veggie) – to enable the growth of lettuce (Lactuca sativa) aboard the outpost for scientific research, air purification and ultimately human consumption Veg-01 hardware validation test includes a plant growth chamber in which the lettuce is grown in bellows-type pillows using LED lighting
- a pair of legs for the Robonaut 2 prototype which has been aboard the space station since its launch on STS-133 in 2011
- Project MERCCURI, a project examining the microbial diversity of the built environment on earth and on the International Space Station

The 1,600 kg (3,500 lb) of downmass cargo from the mission was returned to the Port of Long Beach via marine vessel on 20 May 2014, two days after splashdown. Time-sensitive cargo are unloaded in California and flown to NASA receiving locations. The remainder of the cargo will be unloaded and transferred to NASA at the SpaceX McGregor test facility in Texas, where the Dragon capsule will be fully decommissioned and defueled. Water was found inside the Dragon capsule but preliminary checks indicated that no scientific equipment had been damaged. The source of the water has not been confirmed and will be investigated during the decommissioning of the capsule.

== Secondary payloads ==
In addition to the primary payload, a Dragon cargo capsule resupply space transport mission to the ISS for NASA, SpaceX deployed five secondary payload CubeSats on the CRS-3 Falcon 9 mission. The CubeSats are part of the ELaNa-V mission partially funded under NASA "Educational Launch of Nanosatellites" program. These spacecraft were released from four Poly Picosatellite Orbital Deployers (PPODs) attached to the second stage of the Falcon 9 following the separation of the Dragon from the second stage:

- ALL-STAR/THEIA, the Agile Low-cost Laboratory for Space Technology Acceleration and Research is equipped with the Telescopic High-definition Earth Imaging Apparatus (THEIA) camera, it is being used to return color images of the Earth. It is also the first flight a new nanosat satellite bus intended to serve as a platform for future university payloads. ALL-STAR is a three-unit CubeSat built by the University of Colorado Boulder however its primary mission is to test the underlying spacecraft platform for future missions and to provide experience of designing, building and operating a satellite to the university's students. ALL-STAR is a 3U CubeSat from the Colorado Space Grant Consortium (CoSGC)
- the KickSat CubeSat, which was developed by Cornell University and funded through a campaign on the KickStarter website, was intended to deploy a constellation of 104 cracker-sized femtosatellites called "Sprites", or "ChipSats". Each Sprite is a 3.2 cm (1.3 in) square which includes miniaturised solar cells, a gyroscope, magnetometer and a radio system for communication KickSat failed to deploy the Sprites, and reentered the atmosphere on 14 May 2014.
- PhoneSat-2.5, a 1U CubeSat built by NASA Ames Research Center
- SporeSat, a 3U CubeSat built by NASA Ames Research Center and Purdue University that will perform experiments on plant cell gravity sensing
- TestSat-Lite, a 2U CubeSat from Taylor University
- HEART-FLIES, a 1.5U CubeSat from NASA Ames Research Center and Space Florida Consortium

== Launch vehicle ==
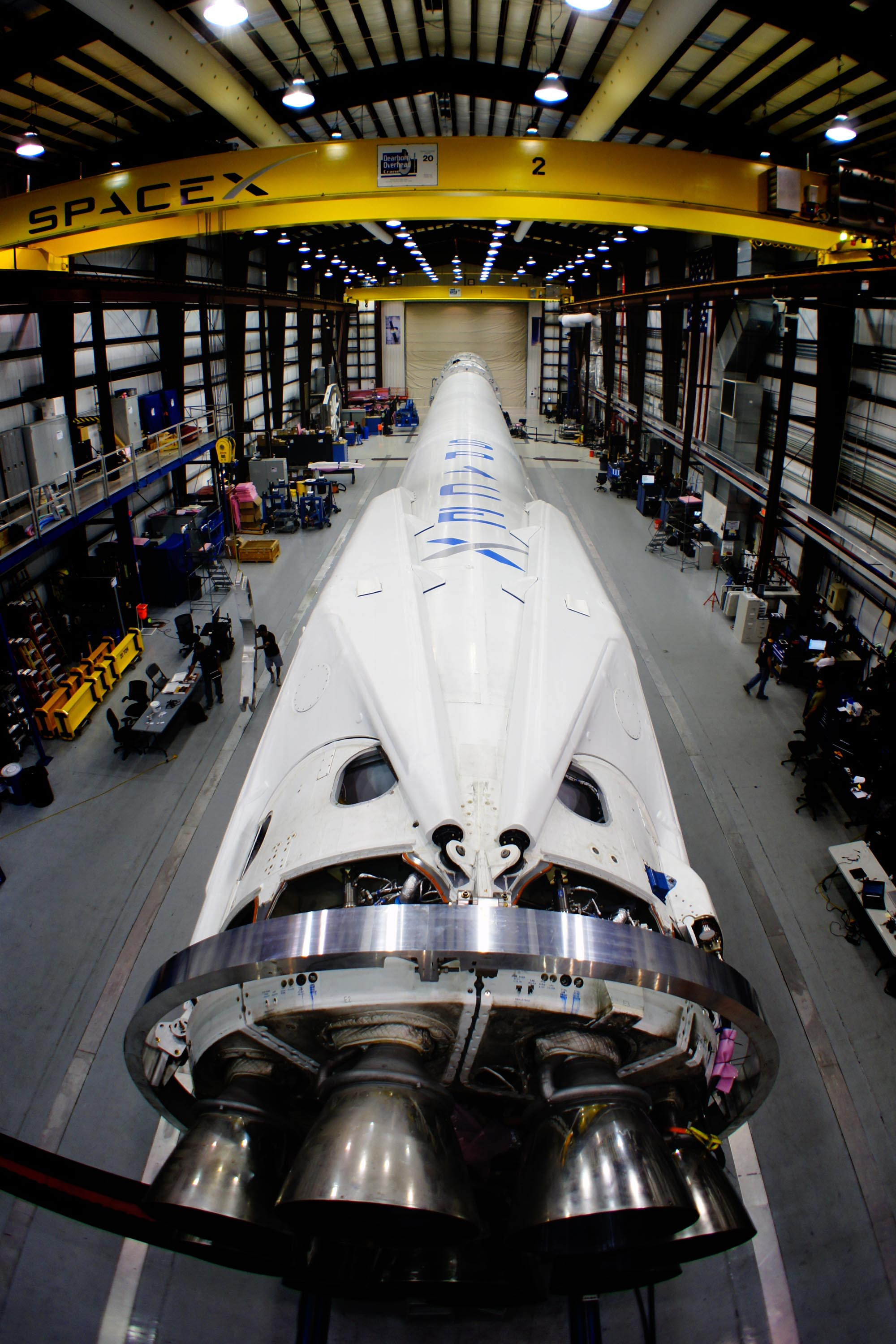
Falcon 9 ahead of CRS-3 with landing legs visible

The CRS-3 mission was the fourth launch of the v1.1 version of the Falcon 9, and the second on which the first-stage booster was used after the mission for a booster descent and landing flight test.

=== Post-mission launch vehicle testing ===
In an arrangement unusual for launch vehicles, the first-stage of the SpaceX Falcon 9 launch vehicle conducted a propulsive-return over-water test after the second stage with the Dragon CRS-3 payload separated from the booster. This was the second high-altitude post-mission test of this type, after the first test on Falcon 9 Flight 6 in September 2013.

During the 18 April 2014 test, the CRS-3 booster became the first successful controlled ocean soft touchdown of a liquid-rocket-engine orbital booster. The booster included landing legs for the first time which were extended for the simulated "landing", and the test utilized more powerful gaseous nitrogen control thrusters than had been used in the previous test to better control aerodynamic-induced rotation. The booster stage successfully approached the water surface with no spin and at zero vertical velocity, as designed. The SpaceX team was able to receive video from cameras placed on the first-stage booster during soft landing test, as well as vehicle telemetry recorded by aircraft, but swells of 4.6–6.1 m (15–20 ft) were reported in the anticipated recovery area. The first stage successfully hovered over the ocean surface, but heavy waves destroyed the stage before boats were able to retrieve it.

== Gallery ==
SpaceX CRS-3
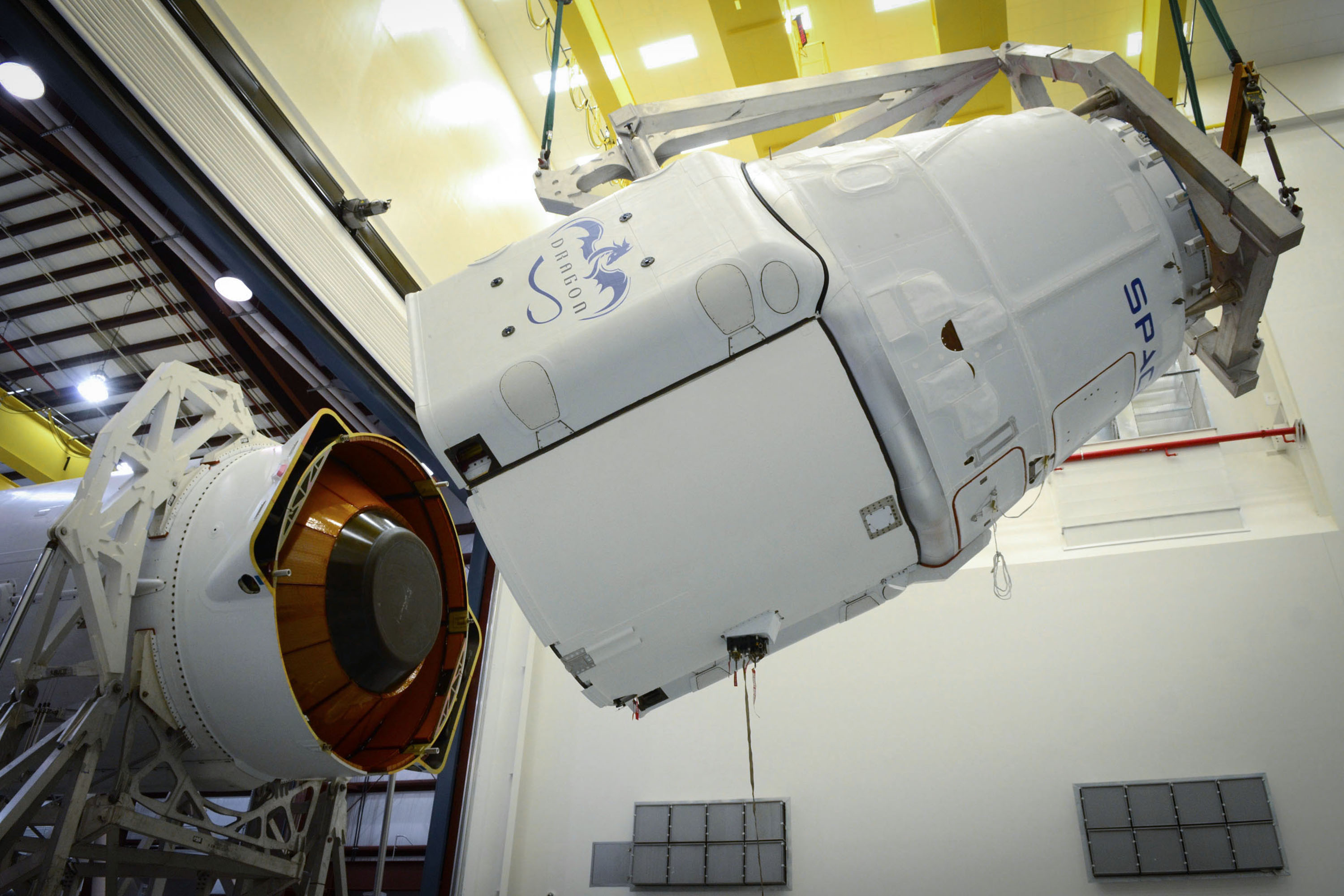
Dragon being mated to Falcon 9

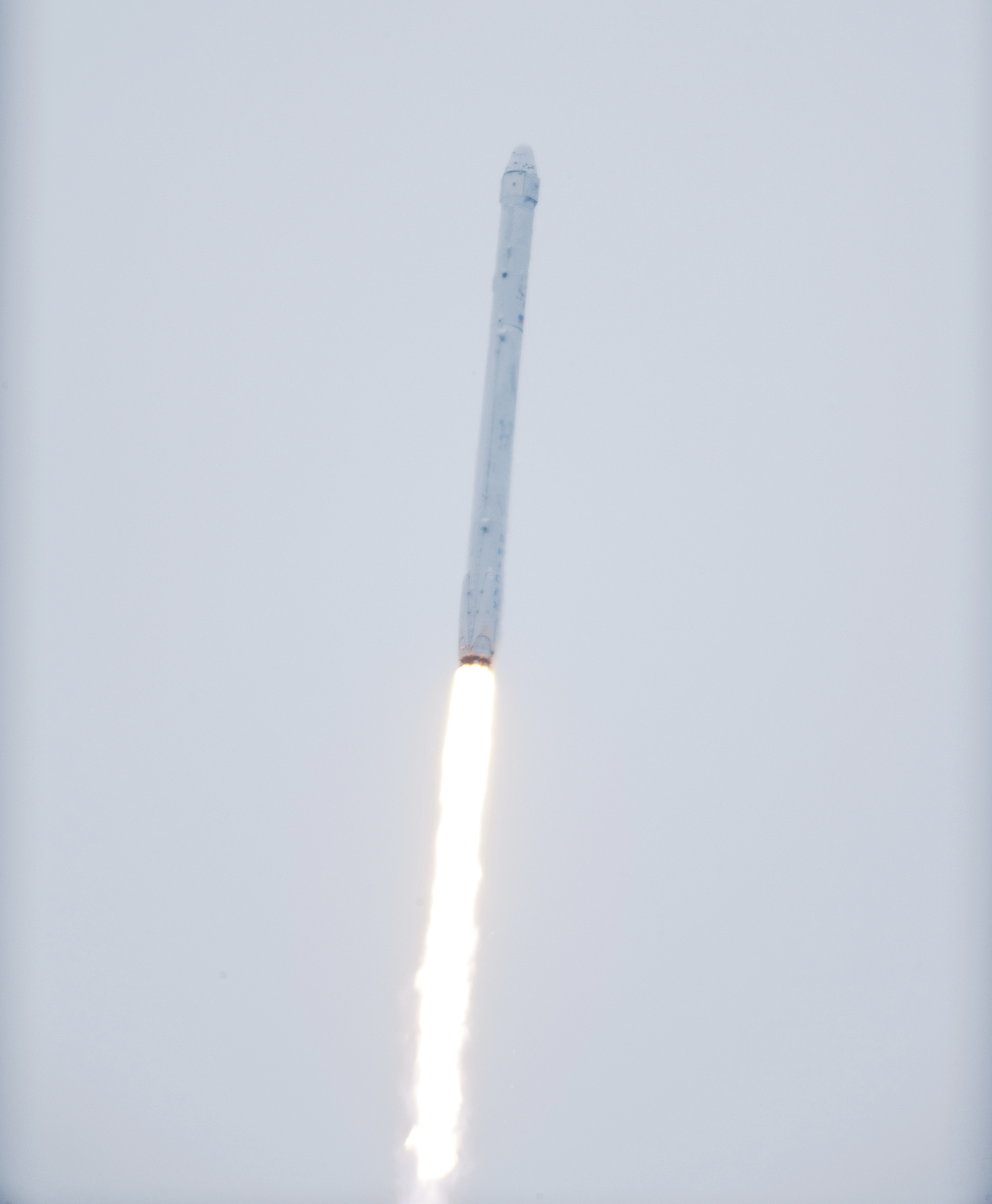
Launch of CRS-3

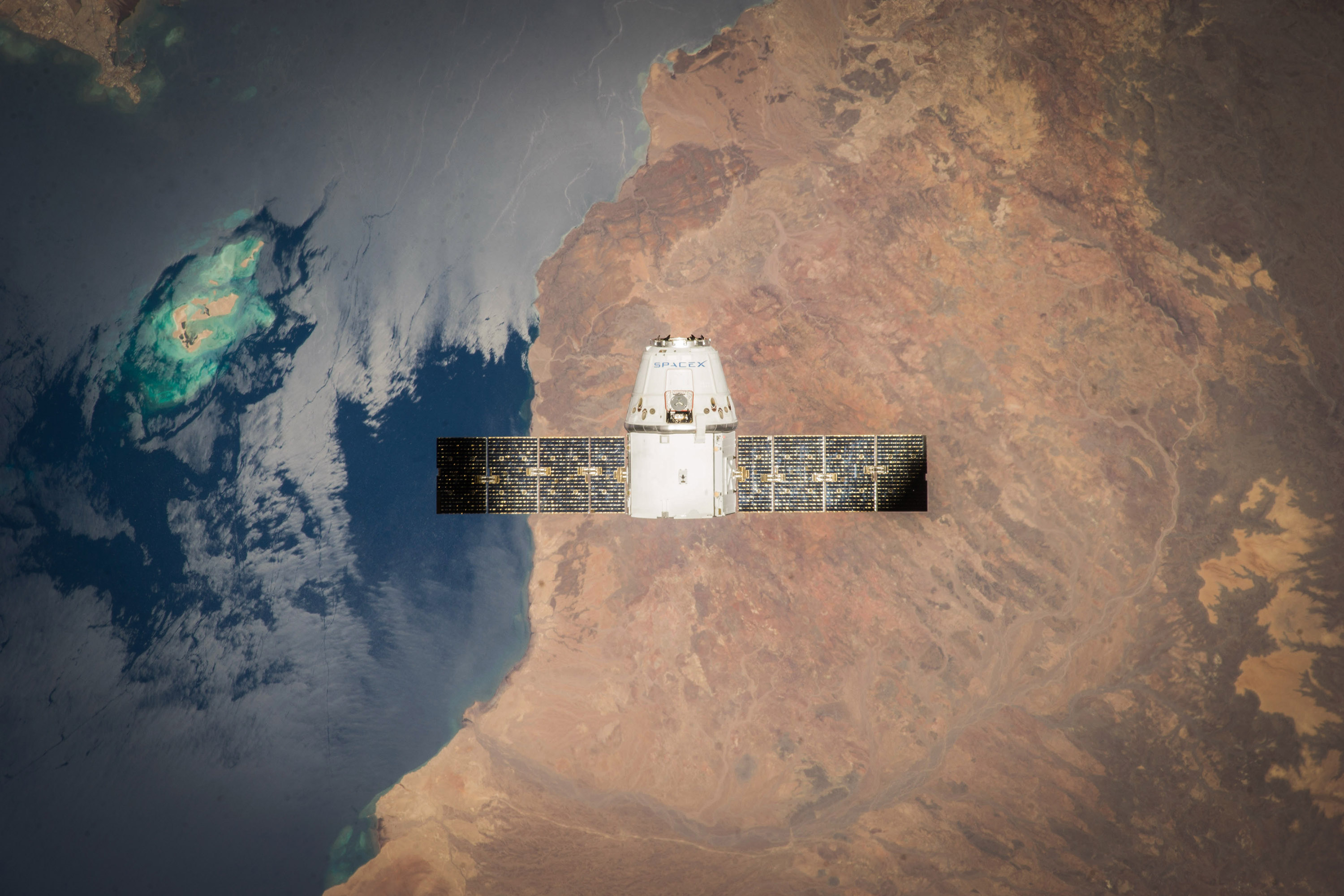
Dragon approaching the ISS

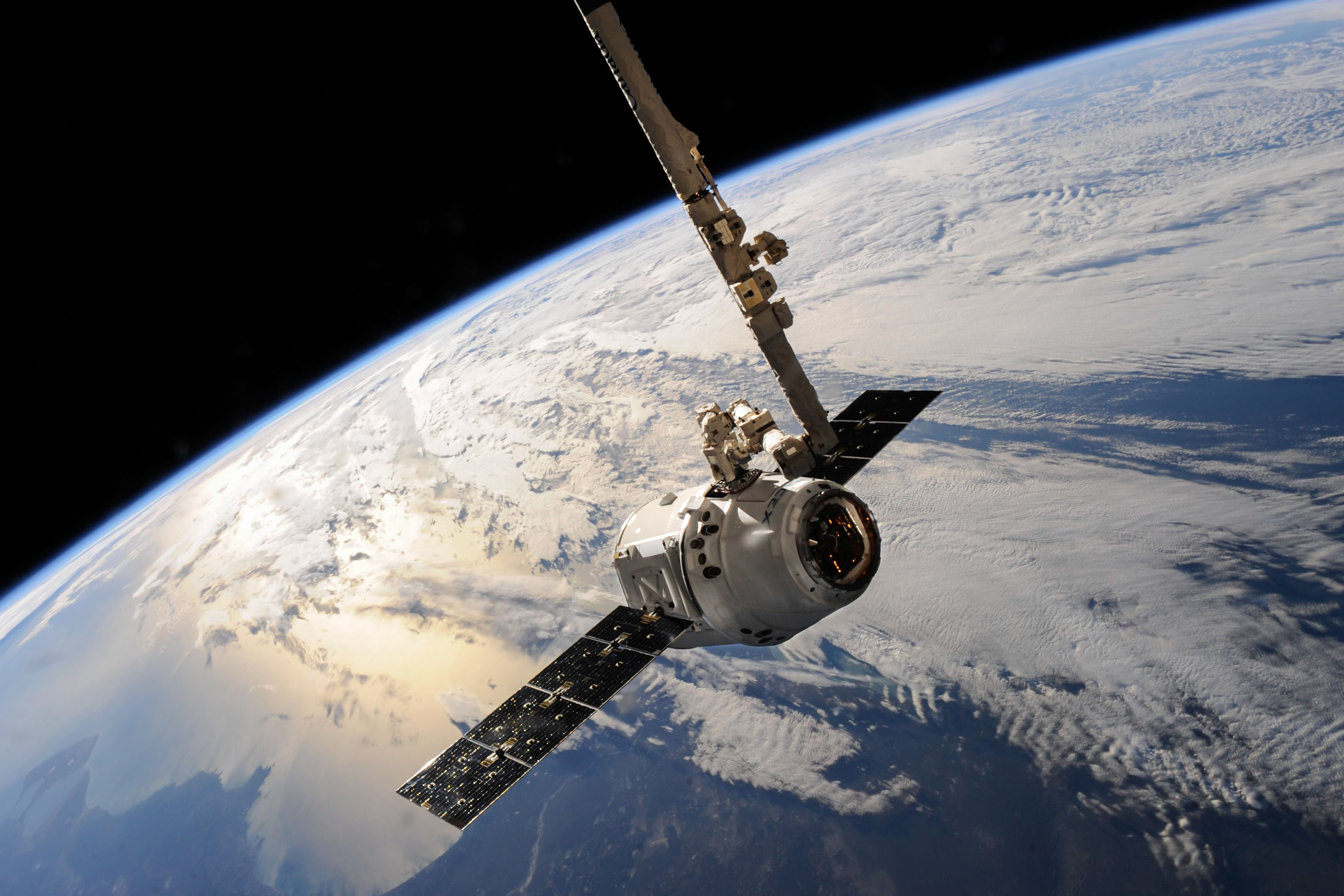
Dragon grappled by the ISS

== See also ==
- List of Falcon 9 launches
