= SpaceX CRS-5 =

2015 American resupply spaceflight to the ISS

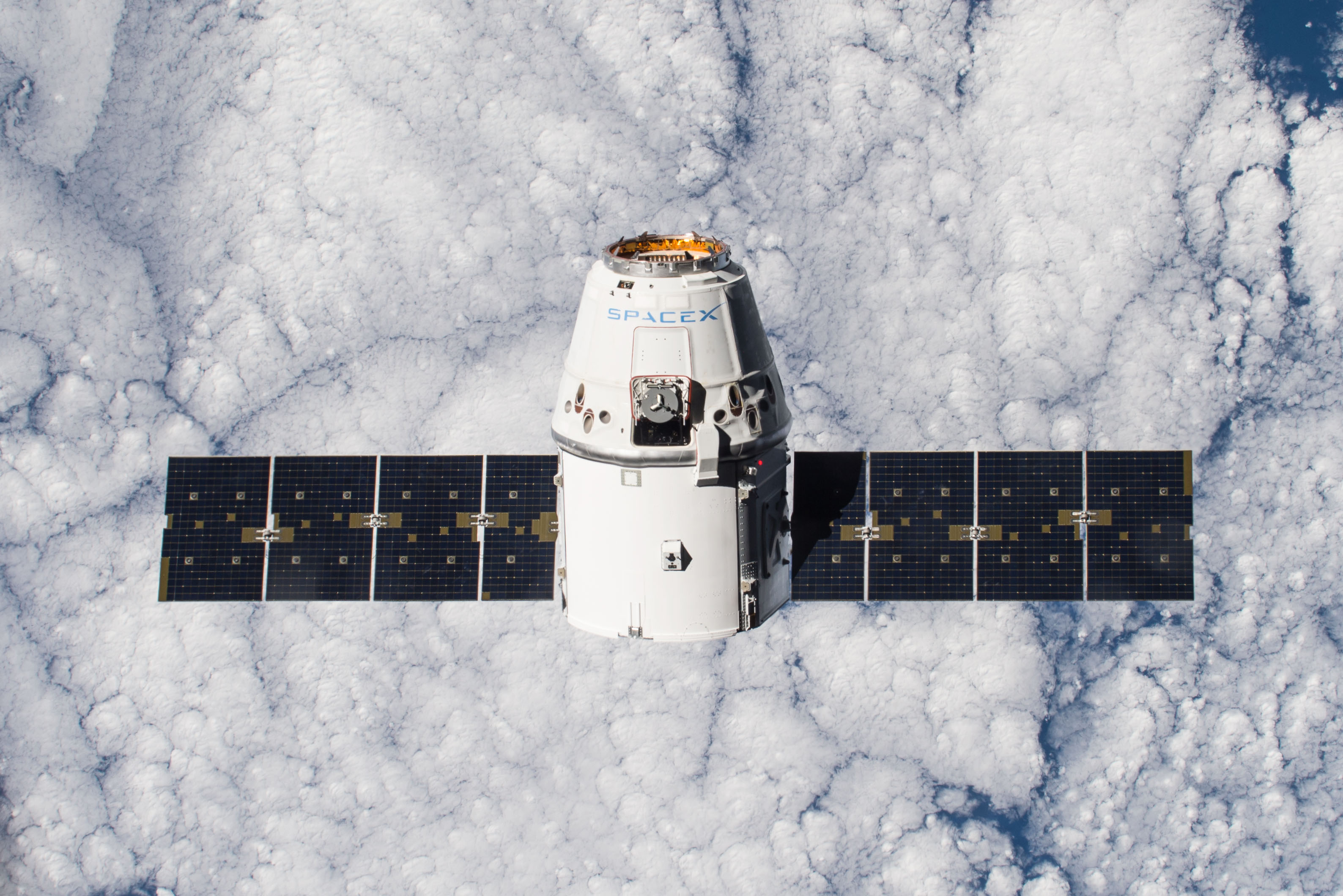
- CRS-5 Dragon on approach to the ISS
- Names: SpX-5
- Mission type: ISS resupply
- Operator: SpaceX
- COSPAR ID: 2015-001A
- SATCAT no.: 40370
- Mission duration: 31 days, 14 hours, 56 minutes

Spacecraft properties
- Spacecraft: Dragon 1 C107
- Spacecraft type: Dragon 1
- Manufacturer: SpaceX
- Launch mass: 6,000 kg (13,000 lb)

Start of mission
- Launch date: 10 January 2015, 09:47:10 UTC
- Rocket: Falcon 9 v1.1 (B1012)
- Launch site: Cape Canaveral, SLC-40

End of mission
- Disposal: Recovered
- Landing date: 11 February 2015, 00:44 UTC
- Landing site: Atlantic Ocean

Orbital parameters
- Reference system: Geocentric orbit
- Regime: Low Earth orbit
- Inclination: 51.65°

Berthing at ISS
- Berthing port: Harmony nadir
- RMS capture: 12 January 2015, 10:54 UTC
- Berthing date: 12 January 2015, 13:54 UTC
- Unberthing date: 10 February 2015, 17:11 UTC
- RMS release: 10 February 2015, 19:10 UTC
- Time berthed: 29 days, 3 hours, 17 minutes

Cargo
- Mass: 2,317 kg (5,108 lb)
- Pressurised: 1,823 kg (4,019 lb)
- Unpressurised: 494 kg (1,089 lb)
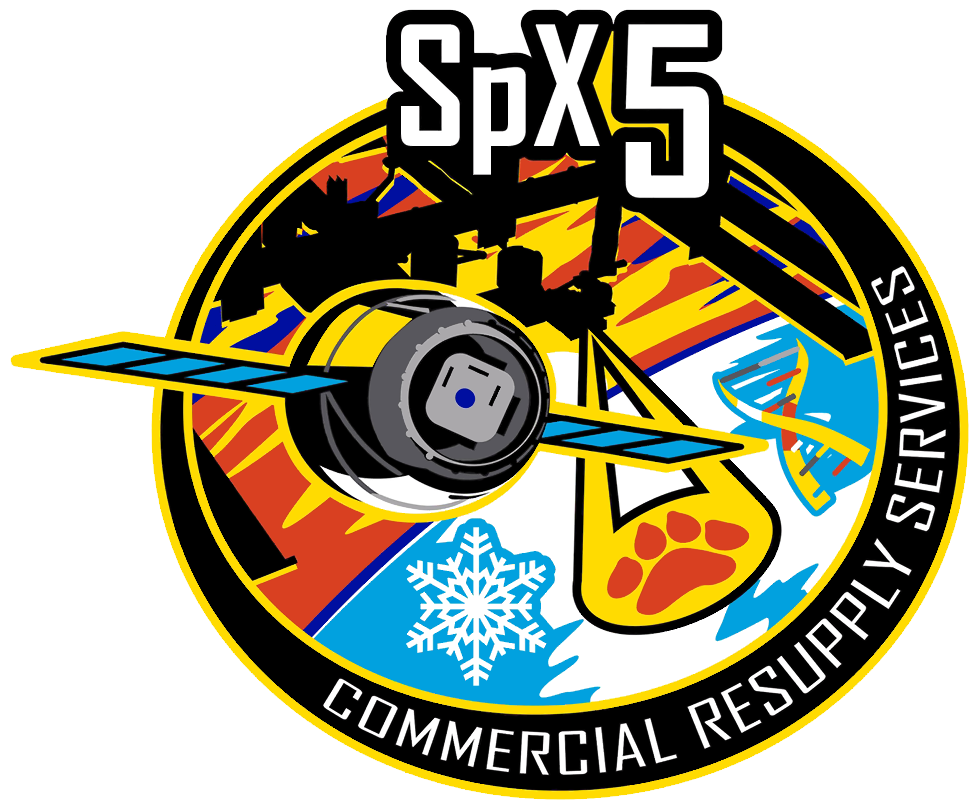
- NASA SpX-5 mission patch Commercial Resupply Services Cargo Dragon

SpaceX CRS-5, also known as SpX-5, was a Commercial Resupply Service mission to the International Space Station (ISS), conducted by SpaceX for NASA, and was launched on 10 January 2015 and ended on 11 February 2015. It was the seventh flight for SpaceX's uncrewed Dragon cargo spacecraft and the fifth SpaceX operational mission contracted to NASA under an ISS resupply services contract.

== Launch history ==
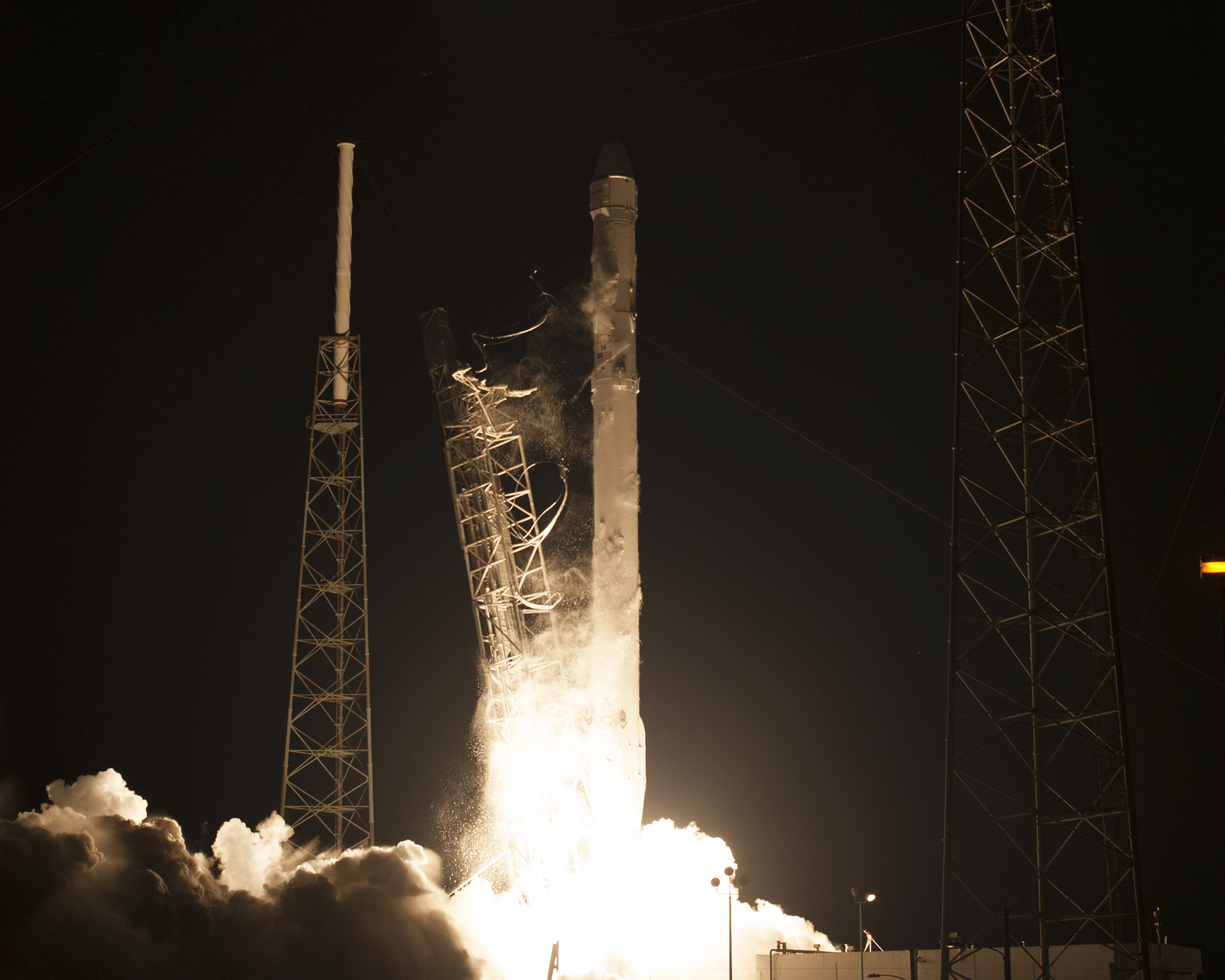
Launch of the Falcon 9 launch vehicle carrying CRS-5

By July 2014, the launch was scheduled by NASA for December 2014, with docking to the station projected to occur two days after launch. Originally scheduled for a 16 December 2014 launch, the mission was changed to 19 December 2014, in order to give SpaceX more preparation time for a successful launch. The launch was postponed again to 6 January 2015, in order to allow more tests before committing to a firm launch date.

On 6 January 2015, the launch attempt was placed on hold at 1 minute 21 seconds prior to scheduled lift-off after a member of the launch team noticed actuator drift on one of two thrust vector control systems of the Falcon 9 second stage engine. As this launch had an instantaneous launch window, meaning no delays are possible in the launch sequence, the flight was postponed to 9 January 2015. On 7 January 2015, the flight was rescheduled for 10 January 2015.

The Falcon 9 launch vehicle carrying the CRS-5 Dragon spacecraft successfully launched on 10 January 2015 at 09:47:10 UTC. Dragon reached the station on 12 January 2015. It was grappled by the Mobile Servicing System (Canadarm2) at 10:54 UTC and berthed to the Harmony module at 13:56 UTC.

== Primary payload ==
The Dragon spacecraft for CRS-5 carried 2,317 kg (5,108 lb) of cargo to the ISS. Included in this was 490 kg (1,080 lb) of provisions and equipment for the crew, 717 kg (1,581 lb) of station hardware, 577 kg (1,272 lb) of science equipment and experiments, and the 494 kg (1,089 lb) Cloud Aerosol Transport System (CATS).

CATS is a LIDAR remote sensing instrument designed to measure the location, composition and distribution of pollution, dust, smoke, aerosols and other particulates in the atmosphere. CATS is to be installed on the Kibō module external facility and is expected to run for at least six months, and up to three years.

Upon completion of its stay, Dragon was loaded with 1,332 kg (2,937 lb) of outgoing cargo, returning it back to Earth.

== Post-launch flight test ==
In an unprecedented test flight, SpaceX attempted to return the first stage of the Falcon 9 through the atmosphere and land it on a 90 m × 50 m (300 ft × 160 ft) floating platform called the autonomous spaceport drone ship. In October 2014, SpaceX had revealed that the ship was being built for SpaceX in Louisiana, and by mid-December 2014, the ship was docked in Jacksonville, Florida, ready to go to sea to support the test flight landing attempt.

=== Results of first landing attempt ===
SpaceX attempted a landing on the drone ship on 10 January 2015. Many of the test objectives were achieved, including precision control of the first stage's descent to land on the platform at a specific point in the south Atlantic Ocean and a large amount of test data was obtained from the first use of grid fin control surfaces used for more precise reentry positioning. However, the first stage was destroyed due to a hard landing. Musk said that one of the possible problems was the grid fins running out of hydraulic fluid.

The SpaceX webcast indicated that the boostback burn and re-entry burns for the descending first stage occurred, and that the descending then went "below the horizon", as expected, which eliminated the live telemetry signal. Shortly thereafter, SpaceX released information that the first stage did get to the drone spaceport ship as planned, but "landed hard ... Ship itself is fine. Some of the support equipment on the deck will need to be replaced". SpaceX made a video of the landing attempt available on Vine.

== Gallery ==
SpaceX CRS-5
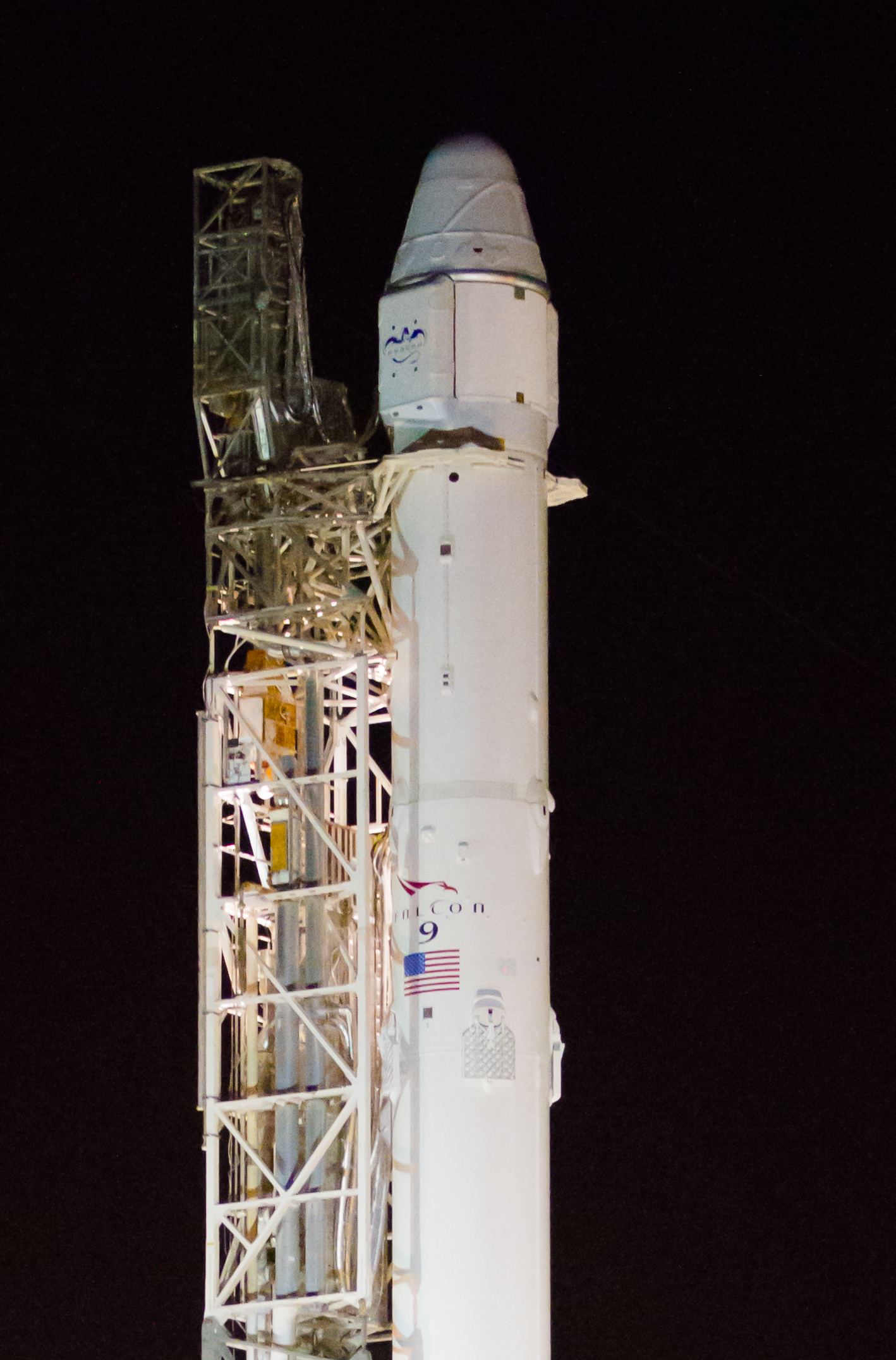
CRS-5 on the pad

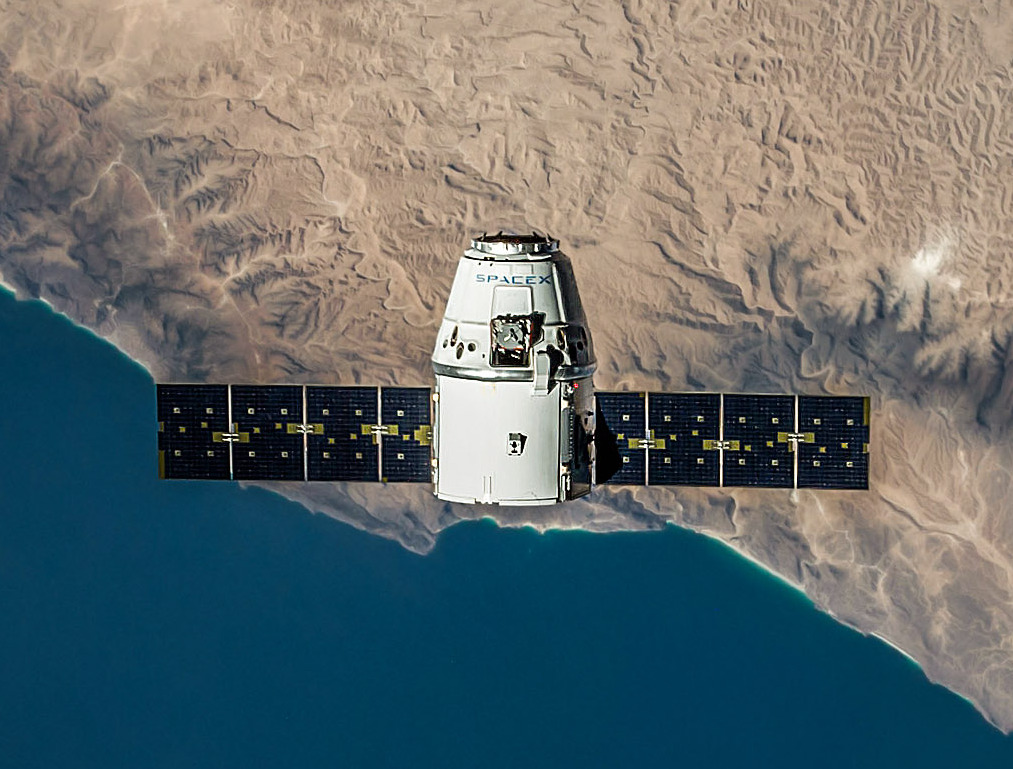
CRS-5 approaching the ISS

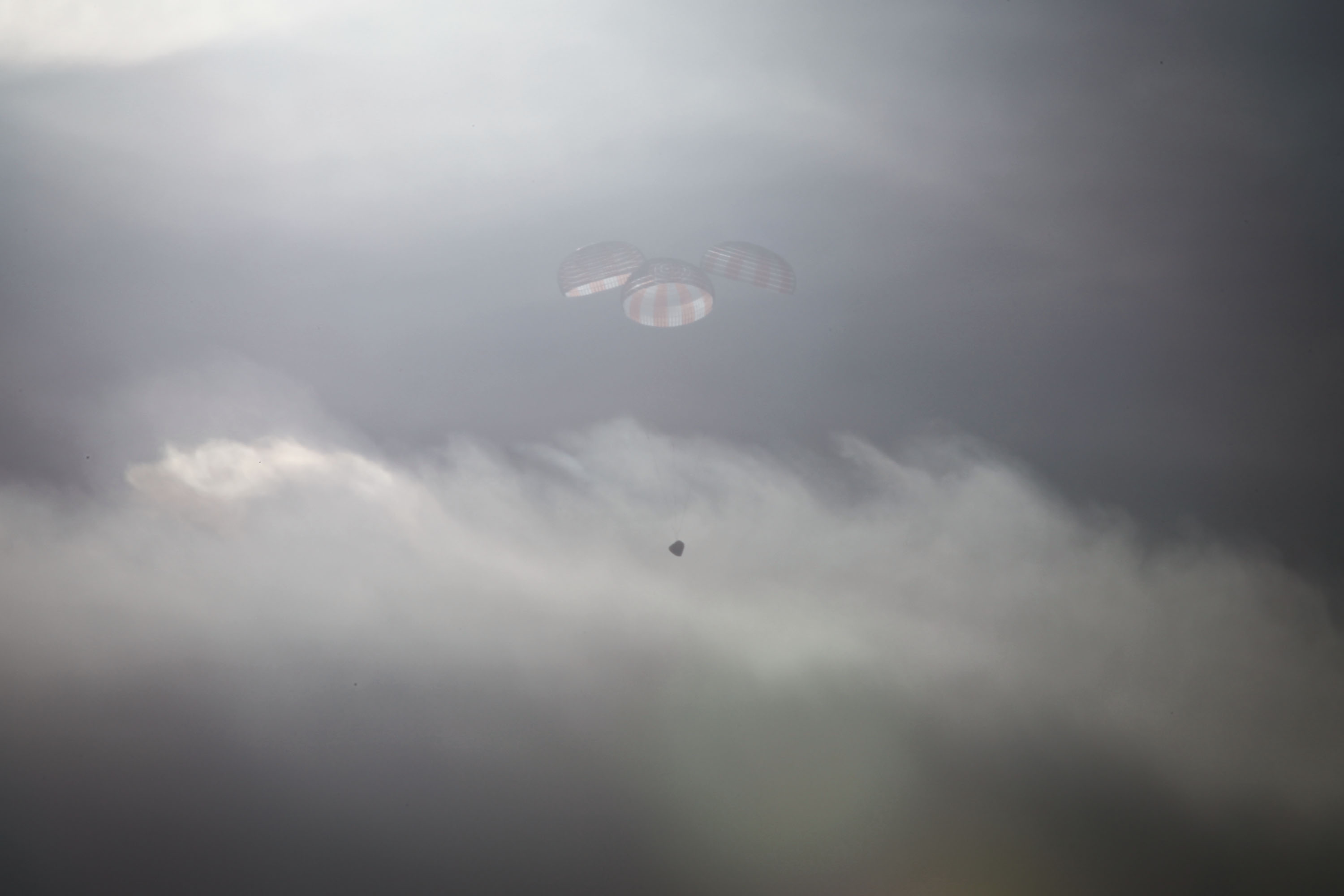
Dragon descending under parachute

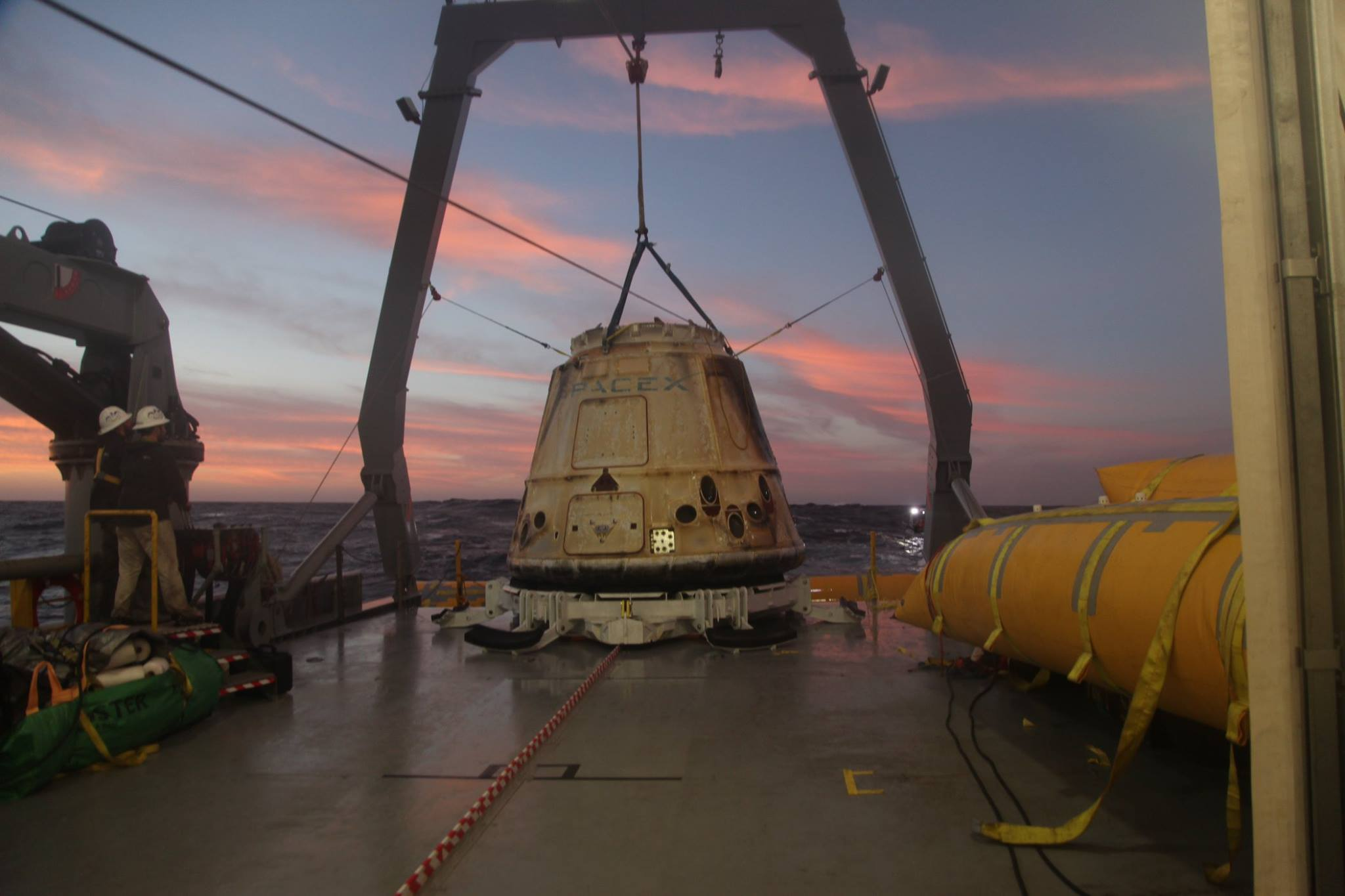
Dragon after recovery

== See also ==
- List of Falcon 9 launches
