= Cloud Aerosol Transport System =

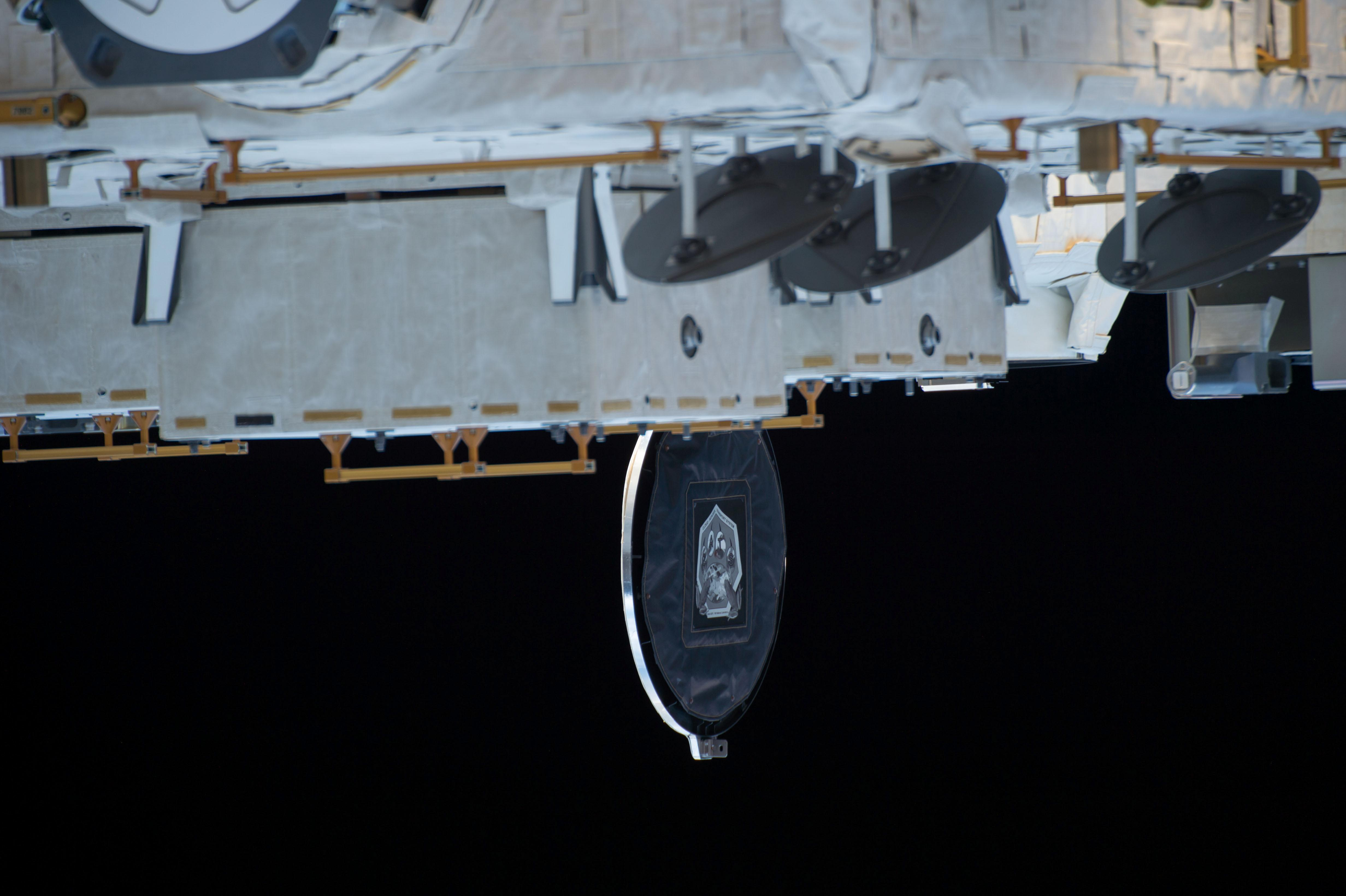
Cloud Aerosol Transport System with its door open

The Cloud Aerosol Transport System (CATS) was a light detection and ranging remote sensing instrument designed to measure the location, composition and distribution of pollution, dust, smoke, aerosols and other particulates in the atmosphere. CATS was installed on the Kibo module of the International Space Station and was expected to run for at least six months, and up to three years.

It was launched in January 2015 aboard the SpaceX CRS-5 resupply mission. CATS used a laser operating at three wavelengths (1064, 532, and 355 nm) to determine cloud layer height, thickness, and depth. Some of the applications of the data gathered will be to develop and refine climate models as well as providing insight for future examinations of the atmospheres of Mars, Jupiter, and other extraterrestrial atmospheres.

On October 31, 2017, CATS suffered a power failure and the main aperture door was left open. Because the door must remain closed when the instrument is on the light side of the Earth in the Sun on the pass after the failure the primary mirror was pointed towards the Sun and the optics were fried. On June 14, 2018 during a spacewalk Andrew J. Feustel succeeded in closing the aperture door and tied it shut with wire ties. CATS was disposed of on SpaceX CRS-17 when it was replaced by OCO-3.
