= Falcon 9 flight 26 =

- Official insignia for the mission

Falcon 9 Full Thrust launch
- Launch: June 15, 2016, 14:29 UTC
- Operator: SpaceX
- Pad: Cape Canaveral SLC-40
- Payload: ABS-2A; Eutelsat 117 West B
- Outcome: Partial success

Components
- First stage: B1024

Falcon launches

Falcon 9 flight 26 was the 26th Falcon 9 space launch by SpaceX, which launched both ABS's ABS-2A and Eutelsat's Eutelsat 117 West B (formerly Satmex 9) to geostationary transfer orbit, that occurred on 15 June 2016 at 14:29 UTC (10:29am local time).

After the launch, the first stage of the Falcon 9 experienced a hard landing and failed to land successfully on the deck of the droneship Of Course I Still Love You in the Atlantic Ocean. The landing failed due to low thrust on one of the three engines during the landing burn; as the rocket stage was about to land on the deck, the engines ran out of oxidizer.

== See also ==
- Flight 26's first-stage landing test
- List of Falcon 9 launches
