= Common Berthing Mechanism =

Berthing mechanism used to connect ISS modules

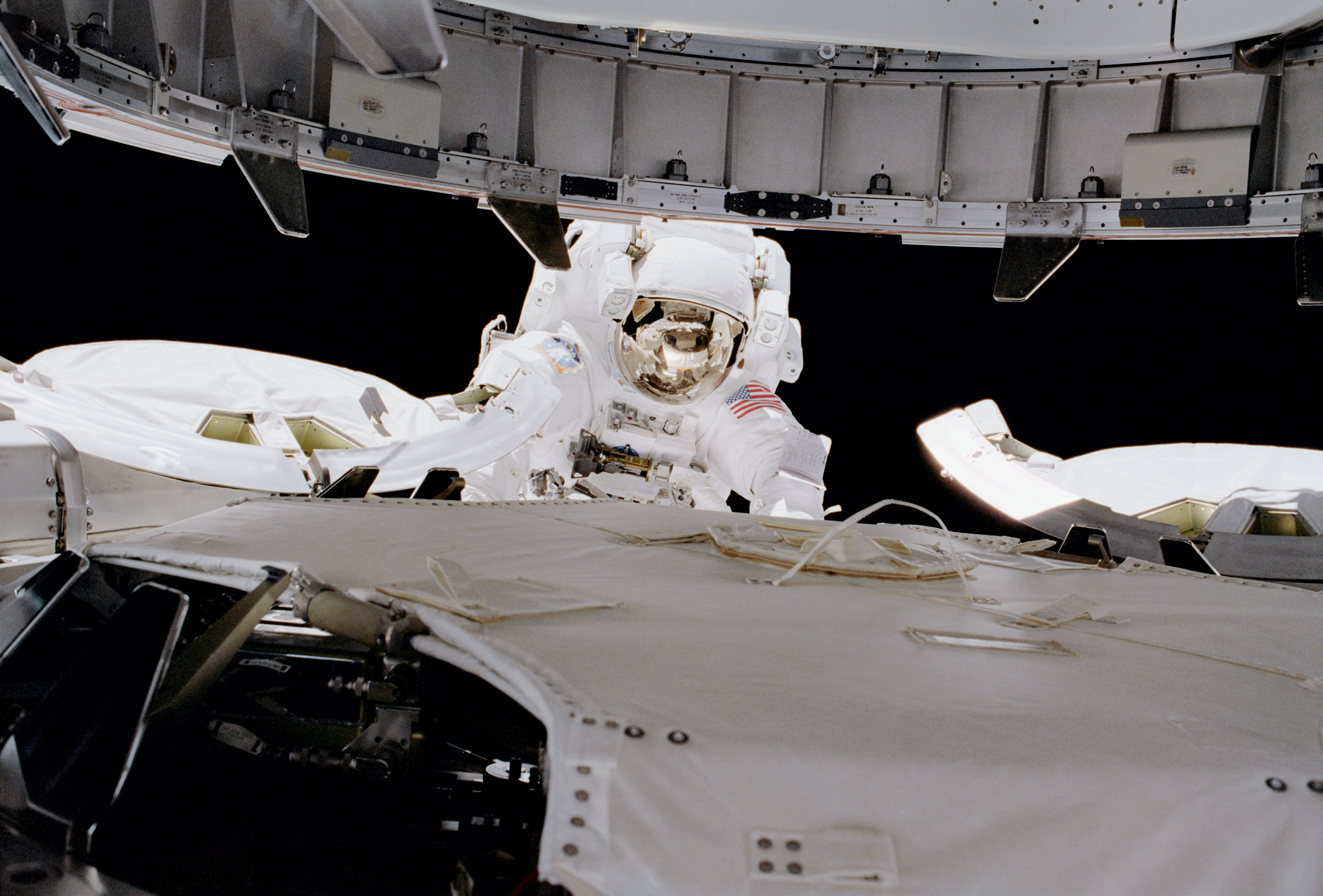
- STS-92 MS Wisoff peers between CBMs.
- Type: Non-androgynous berthing mechanism
- Developer: NASA; Boeing
- Length: ~16 in (0.4 m)
- Diameter: ~71 in (1.8 m)
- First use: 11 October 2000

Active CBM (Type I)
- Mass: 540 lb (240 kg) (specified)

Active CBM (Type II)
- Mass: 685 lb (311 kg) (specified)

Passive CBM
- Mass: 440 lb (200 kg) (specified)

The Common Berthing Mechanism (CBM) connects habitable elements in the US Orbital Segment (USOS) of the International Space Station (ISS). The CBM has two distinct sides that, once mated, form a cylindrical vestibule between modules. The vestibule is about 16 inches (0.4 m) long and 6 feet (1.8 m) across. At least one end of the vestibule is often limited in diameter by a smaller bulkhead penetration.

The elements are maneuvered to the berthing-ready position by a Remote Manipulator System (RMS). Latches and bolts on the active CBM (ACBM) side pull fittings and floating nuts on the passive CBM (PCBM) side to align and join the two.

After the vestibule is pressurized, crew members clear a passage between modules by removing some CBM components. Utility connectors are installed between facing bulkheads, with a closeout panel to cover them. The resulting tunnel can be used as a loading bay, admitting large payloads from visiting cargo spacecraft that would not fit through a typical personnel passageway.

== Design overview ==
All CBM types feature an aluminum ring that is bolted onto the pressure shell during fabrication of the parent module. The bolted joint compresses two concentric o-ring seals: one is silicone (for better temperature performance), and the other is fluorocarbon (for better resistance to scrubbing). A mated pair of rings is primary structure for life-critical pressure loads, so the rings and seals were engineered to the same standards as the module shells. If the primary seals deteriorate, they can be augmented by secondary seals that were designed and qualified as part of the CBM. The secondary seals can be installed as an intravehicular activity (IVA).

Most of the vestibule's volume is reserved for crew passage, and a closeout is typically installed around the perimeter of the hatch as a boundary for the passageway. In most locations, volume is reserved for utility connections outboard of the closeout. The set of utilities is specific to each pair of mated modules.

Major CBM Types

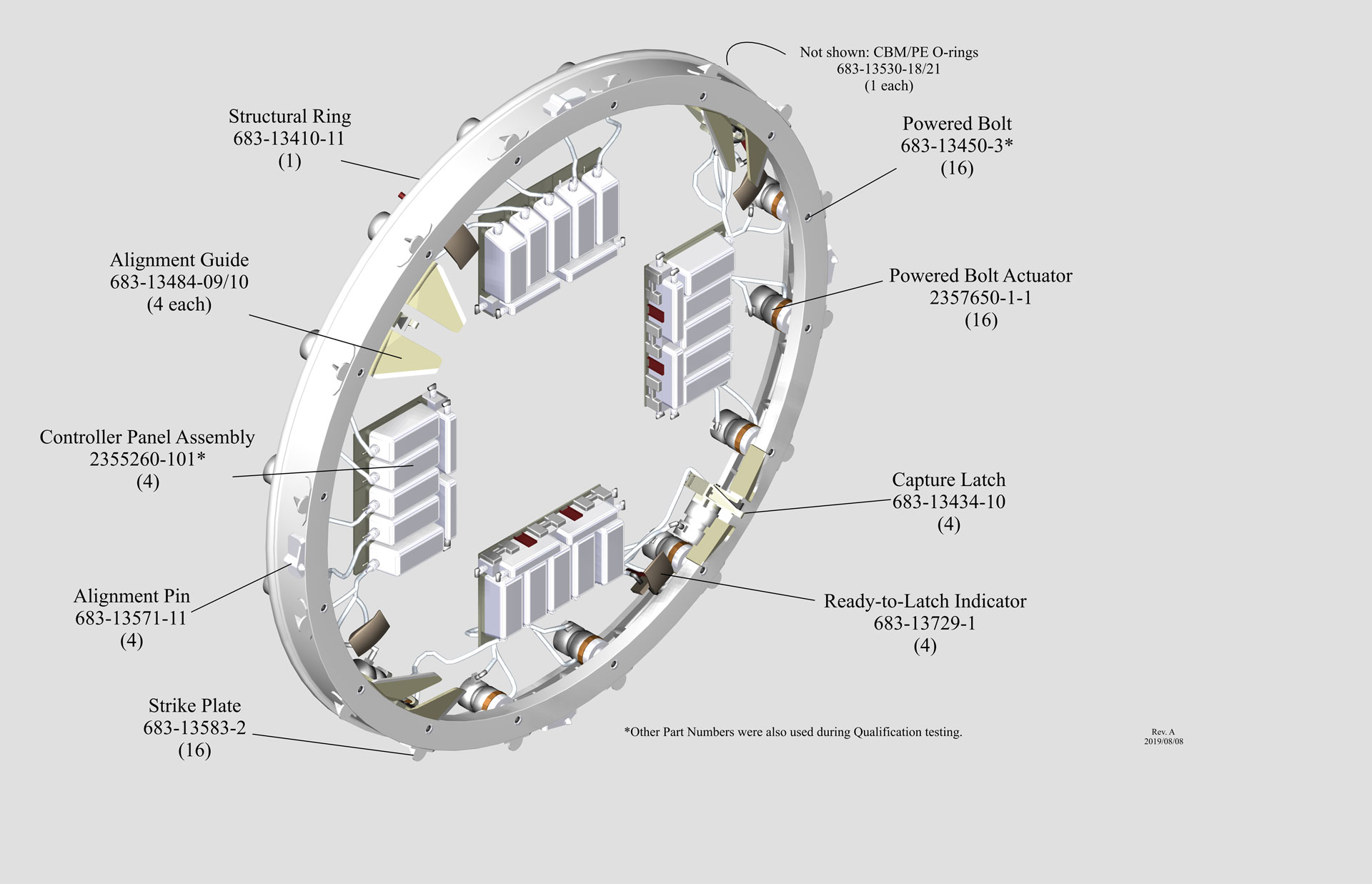
ACBM Type I

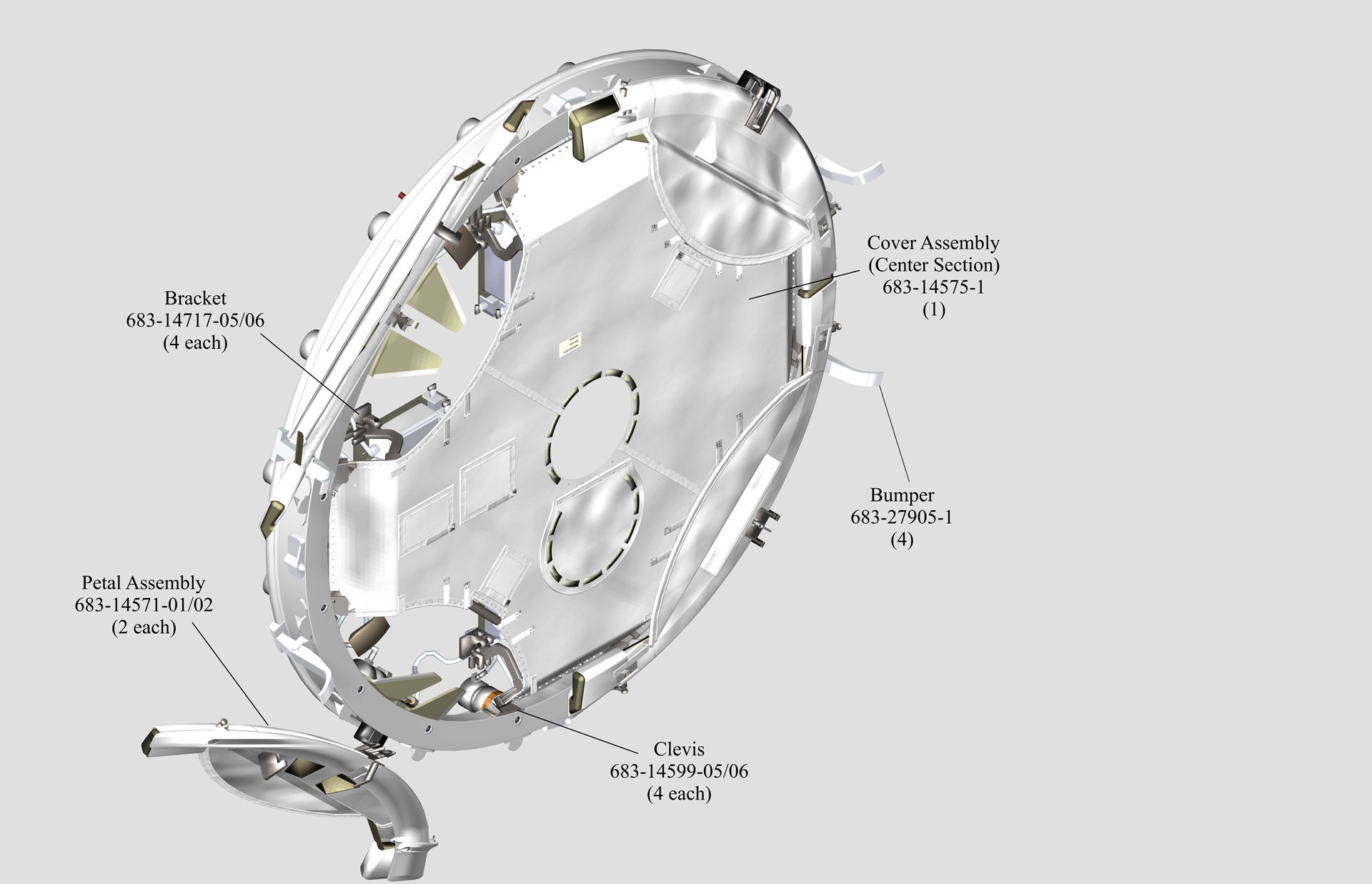
ACBM Type II

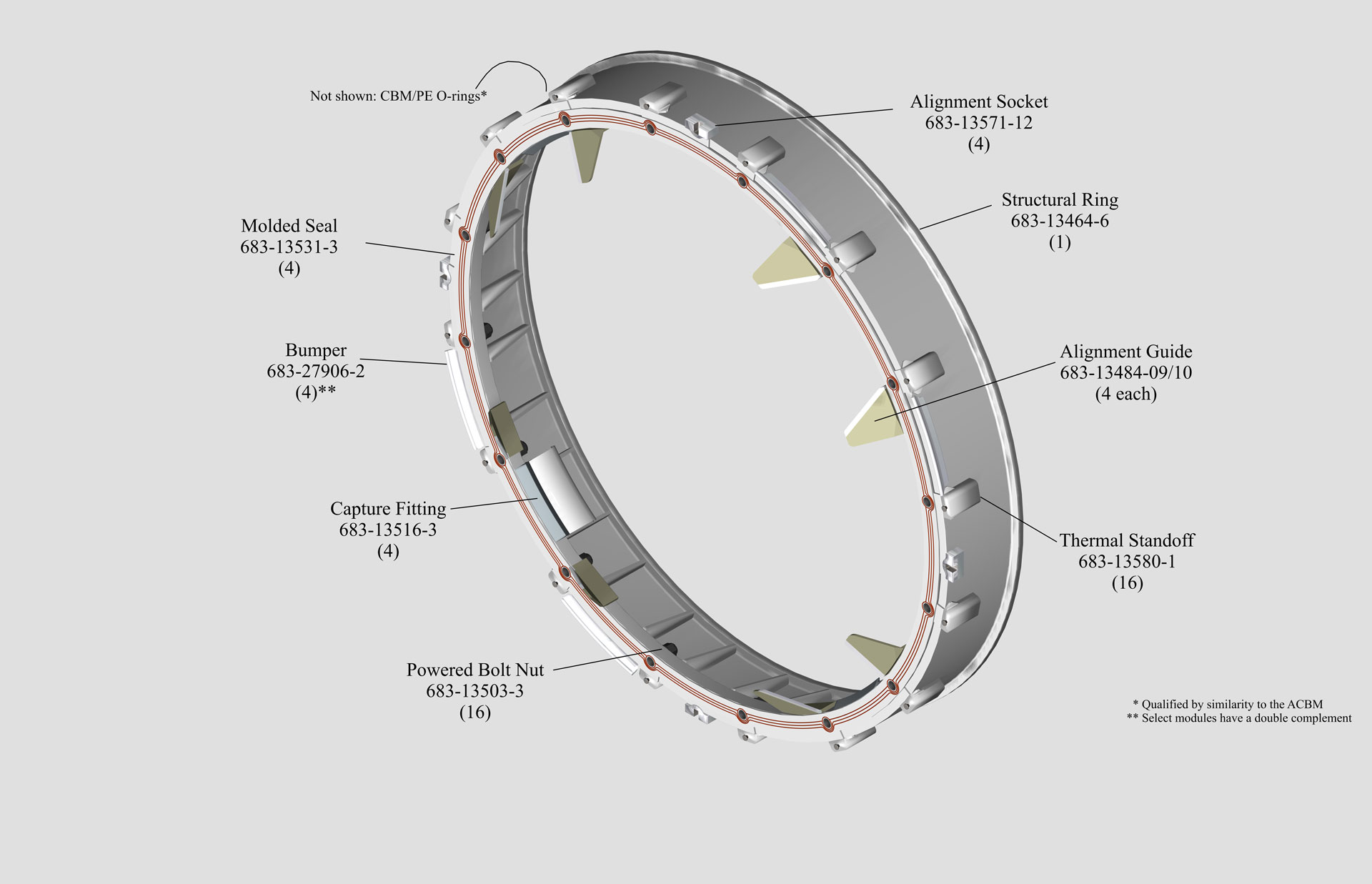
PCBM (generic)

Artist renditions
with qualification part numbers

In addition to its structural characteristics, the ACBM performs and reverses the basic functions associated with berthing:

- Alignment physically constrains motion between the modules in five of the six degrees of freedom as the distance between them changes. The constraints are imposed by successive sets of structural components.
- An indication of readiness to operate capture latches is provided to the RMS operator when the incoming module has been correctly placed within reach of the latches. Ready-to-latch indication is provided by four mechanisms: one in each quadrant, associated with each latch.
- The incoming module is captured by four latches. They draw it through a combined rotation and translation to align the PCBM to the ACBM with a small residual gap.
- A rigid structural connection is established. Each of 16 powered bolts on the ACBM crosses the residual gap to thread into a nut on the PCBM. The bolts are tightened in a multi-stage process that gradually conforms the two flanges, compresses the CBM/CBM seals, and preloads the CBM/CBM joint.

Two functional types were specified for the ACBM. The Type I ACBM, with a complement of 24 independent mechanisms, can be found either axially or radially oriented on the parent module. It can face any of the six orbital orientations, so can be anywhere within a wide range of temperatures at the start of berthing operations.

The Type II ACBM augments the design of the Type I with components to protect its parent module when nothing is berthed on a port. Four of the components are mechanisms that can be deployed to get out of the incoming module's way. Others are removed by the crew after the vestibule is pressurized. The Type II is used where ports would otherwise be exposed for long periods of time, or in directions that experience aggressive pre-berth conditions. The Type II ACBM is found on the radial ports of resource nodes, and can face in any orbital orientation.

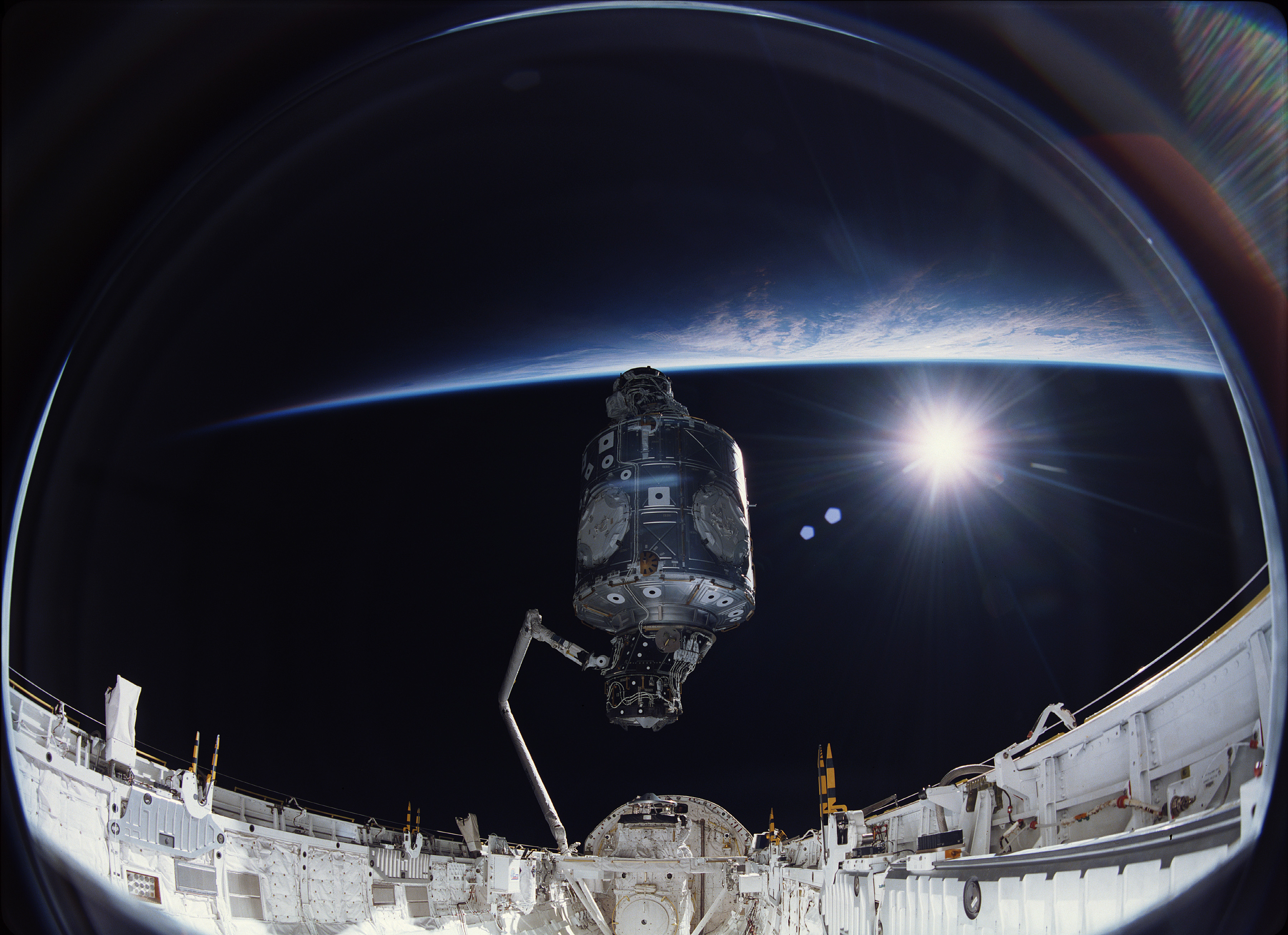
PMA 1 and PMA 2 were launched on the axial ACBMs of Node 1.

The PCBM incorporates fittings and alignment structures corresponding to those on the Type I ACBM. 32 of the fittings are themselves spring-loaded mechanisms, actuated during capture and rigidization by corresponding components of the ACBM. The primary CBM/CBM seal is also part of the PCBM, as are preloaded stand-off/push-off springs to stabilize its relative motion when the CBM/CBM joint is nearly mated.

Two types were specified for the PCBM, differing only in the durability of their seal. The S383 silicon material of the Type I PCBM seal is more forgiving of pre-berth temperature differential between the two modules than the V835 fluorocarbon of the Type II. S383 is also more resistant to atomic oxygen encountered on orbit prior to berthing. The Type II was used to launch small elements in the shuttle payload bay while bolted to an ACBM or to similar flight-support equipment because the V835 material is more resistant to the damaging effects of scrubbing under vibration.

The PCBM is always located on an end of the parent module. It can be attached to a bulkhead or as an end ring on a barrel section of primary structure that is open to vacuum before berthing. PCBMs are attached to modules having a wide range of thermal mass, so can also experience a wide range of initial temperature conditions. By the nature of the operation, the PCBM always faces in the flight orientation opposite that of the ACBM, so the temperature differentials can be significant.

== Operations ==
See the Operations Gallery for more graphics. See the Missions Table for individual berthing events.

=== Post-launch ===
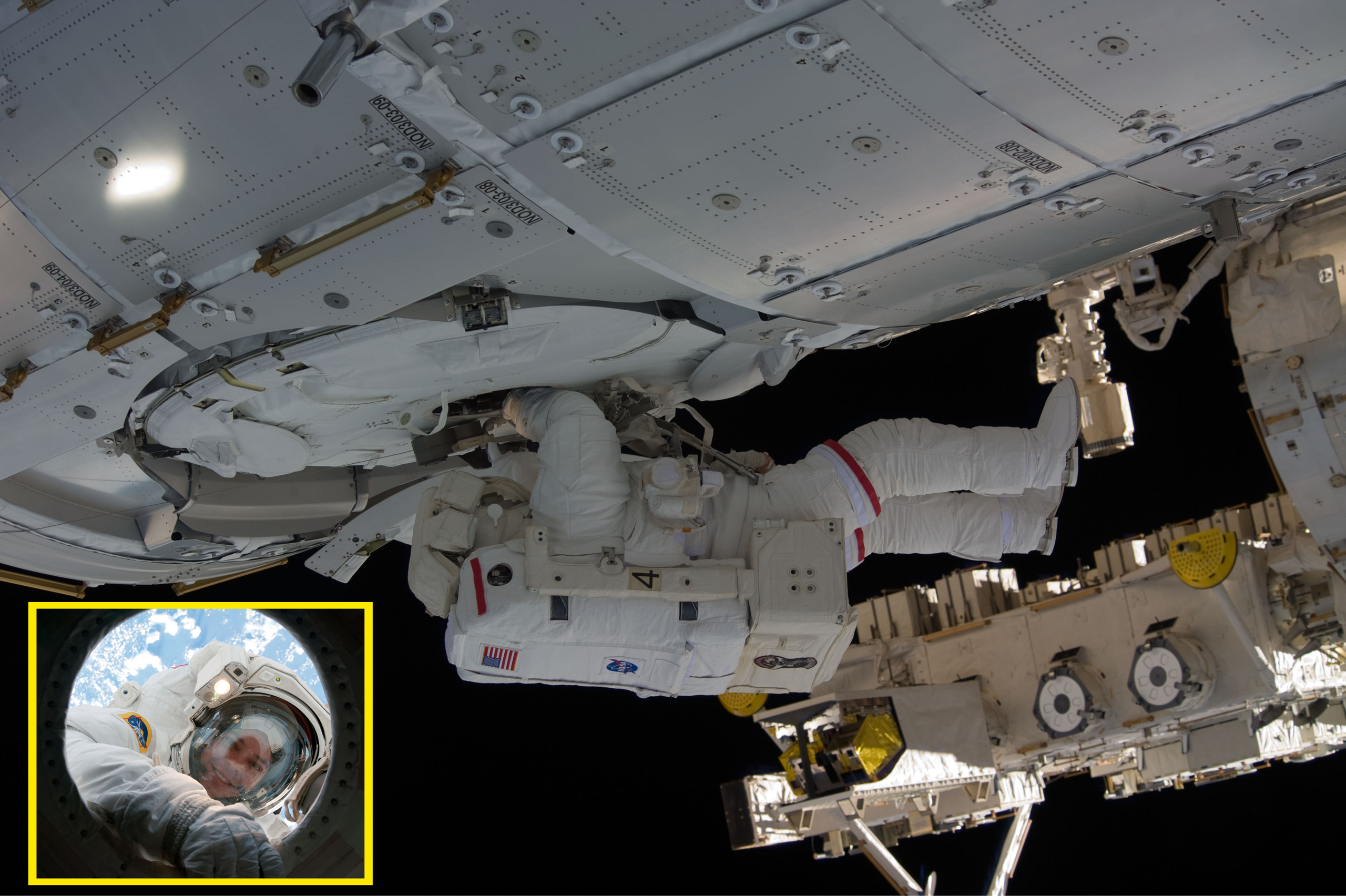
STS-130 MS Robert Behnken takes a break during EVA preparation of Node 3's Nadir ACBM.

ACBMs require EVA to prepare for first use on orbit. Type I ACBMs, usually found on axial ports, typically have a "shower cap" cover that takes two EVA crew members about 45 minutes to remove and stow. Type II ACBMs, found on Node Radial Ports, require release of launch restraints for the Deployable M/D Covers. Release of the spring-loaded covers requires actuation of Capture Latches to close them again afterwards and, therefore, exercises the Ready-to-Latch Indicators. Including inspection, each Radial Port is budgeted about 15 minutes for a single EVA crew member, assisted by IVA crew to operate the ACBM as necessary.

Full-sized elements launched on the NSTS had protective covers over the seal on the PCBM. Two EVA crew members required 40 – 50 minutes each to remove and stow the PCBM's covers, inspecting the seal as they did so, and cleaning it if necessary. Type II PCBMs used as a launch interface were inspected after unbolting, since no covers were installed. For logistics flights, inspection is by camera only.

=== Berthing ===
==== Preparation ====
Checkout of an Active Common Berthing Mechanism during Expedition 56 (about 10x actual speed).

The PCBM requires no preparation for berthing beyond what is required post-launch. Preparation of the ACBM for berthing takes about an hour, beginning with selection of supporting utilities (power, data) and sequential activation for each Controller Panel Assembly (CPA). Two CPAs are selected as the Primary and Secondary Master Controllers.

Activation executes Built-in-Test and initializes position counters for the actuators. Each bolt actuator is extended two revolutions, then retracted three to verify operability of both the bolt and the motor. Latches are driven one at a time to the open position which, for Node Radial Ports, deploys M/D Covers. All 20 actuators are set to the operational initial positions (0 revolutions for the bolts, 202° for latches). A remote inspection is conducted to verify that the latches are fully deployed and the mating corridor and surface are clear of obstructions.

Contingencies considered during preparation include cleaning the face of the ACBM ring, and EVA corrective actions involving the M/D Covers as well as the CPA, Capture Latch, and Ready-to-Latch Indicators. Specific resolution procedures are available for the loss of power and communications support to the CBM.

==== Maneuver ====
The PCBM-equipped module is maneuvered into the capture envelope by a tele-robotically operated Remote Manipulator System (RMS). Two different RMSs have been used to berth modules: the 6-joint Shuttle RMS (SRMS, or "Canadarm") and the 7-joint Space Station RMS (SSRMS, "Canadarm^{2}").

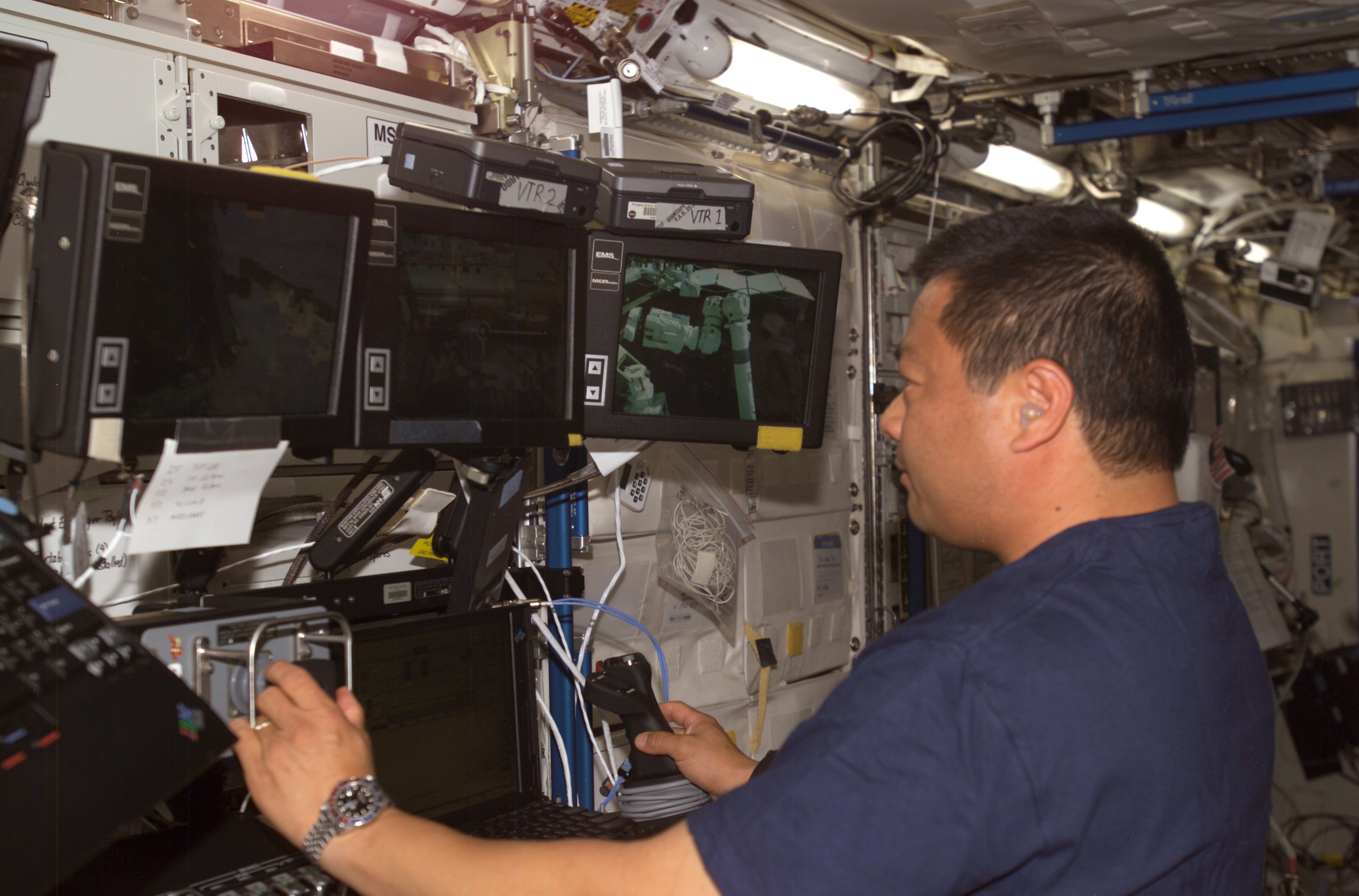
ISS Expedition 10 Cmdr Leroy Chiao operating the SSRMS from the Destiny Lab.

The maneuver operation starts with acquisition of the payload by the RMS End Effector. This step is variously referred to as "capture" or "grappling". During the NSTS era, payloads typically arrived in the Shuttle's Payload Bay. During grapple, the SRMS' joints were "limped", allowing it to conform its posture to the exact location of the payload. The SSRMS typically grapples a free-flying payload that has maneuvered itself to maintain a constant distance and orientation with respect to the ISS. Once grappled, the RMS moves the module by changing its joint angles. The motion of the module must often be choreographed with other moving parts of the ISS such as the Solar Arrays.

NASA animation of three berthing operations with the Shuttle RMS on STS-98.

Visual feedback on the motion of the PCBM has been provided to the RMS operator by at least two dedicated systems. Early berths were guided using a photogrammetric feedback technique called the Space Vision System (SVS), that was quickly determined unsuitable for general use. The SVS was replaced by a task-dedicated Centerline Berthing Camera System (CBCS), first used on STS-98.

The time required to complete the RMS maneuver depends entirely on the trajectory to be followed and on any operational constraints that must be accommodated. The same is true for all contingency planning. Near the end of the maneuver, the operator negotiates a tight corridor as the PCBM begins to mesh with the ACBM. The operation ends when the RMS Operator either sees four Ready-to-Latch indications on the target ACBM, or concludes that only three can be achieved. Because the RTL is a spring-loaded mechanism, the RMS ends up with stored energy and is left in a state that can resist the separating force.

==== Mate ====
The two halves of the CBM are nominally joined in three operations:

- Capture acquires and aligns the in-coming PCBM with respect to the geometry of the ACBM
- Nut Acquisition threads each Powered Bolt into its respective nut
- Boltup fully preloads the joint between the two halves

At least two distinct capture protocols have been executed on orbit. Both protocols issue a "first-stage" capture command to an indicated shaft angle between 185° and 187°. First-stage capture ensures that each latch is positioned above its respective fitting, which is operationally verified by evaluating its switch state. The RMS still controls the position and orientation of the element, and the loads exerted by the Capture Latches remain low. Taking about 15 seconds to complete, first-stage capture is restricted to orbital regions where ground controllers can monitor progress in near real time. To control spurious loads when the berthing element is large, the station Attitude Control System may be maintained in free-drift and crew exercise prohibited.

The two protocols differ in how the latches draw the two halves to within reach of the Powered Bolts. During the NSTS era, a single second-stage "capture" command was issued after the SRMS was placed in "test mode". Five stages of capture are executed when using the SSRMS in order to limit the potential for loads building up in its arm booms if off-nominal braking events occur. In either case, capture drives latches to 12° indicated shaft angle in an actuation time of about 108 seconds. In both protocols, the residual energy in the RTLs might cause them to open briefly because the latches are not "hooked" to their fittings until well below the 187° starting position.

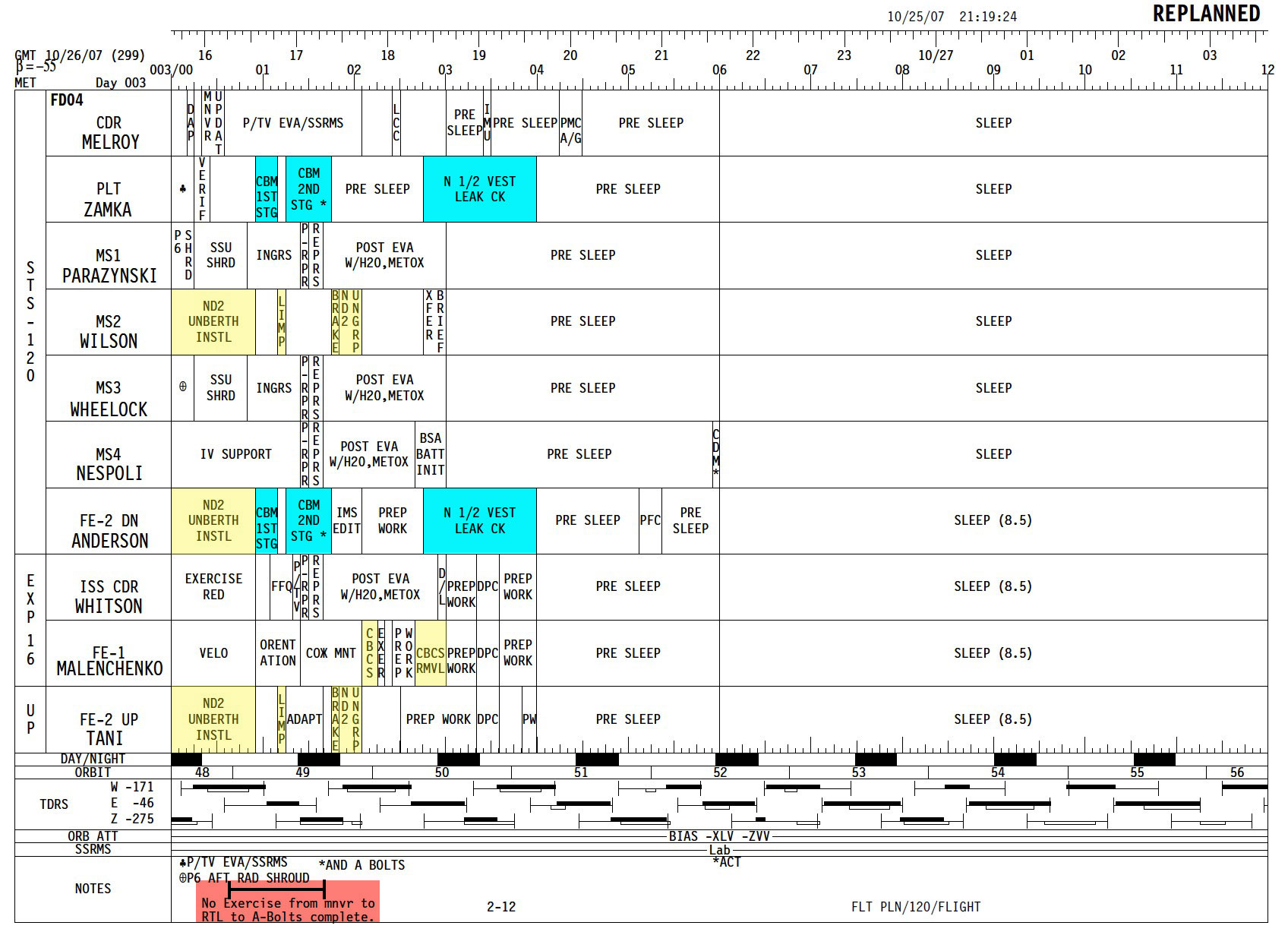
RMS and CBM operations are highlighted yellow and blue, respectively, on this berthing timeline from the STS-120/FD04 Execute Pkg. (NASA/MCC, 2007). Restrictions are highlighted in red. Powered Bolt commands were issued by ground controllers after second-stage capture.

Once the operator concludes that the capture process has completed successfully, all 16 Powered Bolts are actuated at 5 rpm with a preload limit of 1,500 lbf (6,700 N). As the Thermal Standoffs begin to contact their respective Strike Plates, the resulting load is reported by each bolt's Load Cell. This "ABOLT" phase terminates individually for each bolt on the basis of torque, revolutions, or indicated load. Bolts finishing earlier can see their indicated load change as subsequent bolts seat their nuts. The operators, who might be ground-based, evaluate the resulting condition to determine whether the loading condition is acceptable. If so, restrictions are lifted on Attitude Control and exercise. The RMS releases (ungrapples) the payload and can proceed to other tasks.

If pre-mission Thermal Analysis indicates that the temperature differential between the two CBM halves is excessive, the ABOLT condition is held for an extended period of time. The "thermal hold" allows the two sides to approach a common temperature. The Powered Bolts are then tightened in six steps to their full preload. Each command is issued to four bolts at a time, spaced at 90° intervals. Some steps may, at the discretion of the operator, be executed more than once. The final boltup actuation is budgeted for 60 minutes, but can vary quite a bit depending on how many iterations of incremental preload are executed.

Once the operator determines the boltup process to have completed successfully, the latches are commanded to the "closed" position and the CPAs are deactivated. Power, executive command, and data resources are available for reassignment to other tasks.

Accommodations for several off-nominal situations are inherent in the design of the CBM. Any single bolt failure during the mating operation can be accommodated by the CBM/CBM seal, still permitting the vestibule to hold atmospheric pressure. Any two bolt failures can tolerate mechanical loads, provided they are not next to each other and the vestibule is not pressurized. The loss of any single latch and any single Ready-to-Latch indicator can be tolerated without jeopardizing mission success, and the latches themselves are designed to accommodate the possibility for "brakes on" failure modes in the SRMS. Detailed resolution logic for the loss of power and communication is available, as are resolution sequences for latches that "miss" their fittings or jam at a partial stroke. The contingency procedures in this phase of operations also address abnormal braking of the SSRMS and "rapid safing" if other systems in the ISS or Shuttle required immediate departure.

=== IVA operations ===
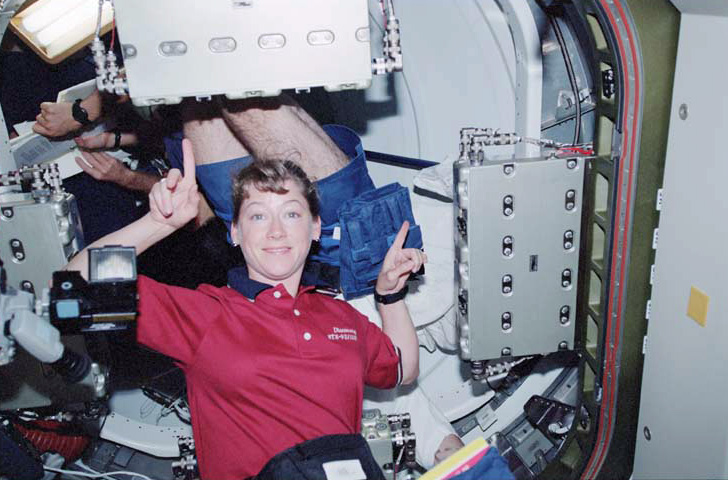
STS-92 Pilot Pamela Melroy identifies two Controller Panel Assemblies (CPAs) to be cleared from the Zenith vestibule of Node 1.

Vestibule outfitting includes equipment setup, leak check, and mechanical reconfiguration. The time and effort required depends on the configuration of the ACBM, the number and type of CBM components to be removed, and on the interfaces to be connected between the two elements. It may be budgeted for as much as ten hours although, in at least some cases, that time might be paused to conduct an extended "fine leak check" by pressure decay before opening the hatch into the vestibule.

Because they overlap the crew corridor through the vestibule, the CPAs must always be cleared away, and it is always necessary to remove any covers across the hatch on the newly berthed element. Where the elements will remain mated for long periods of time, other CBM components may be removed for safe storage or reuse. Node radial ports require an additional 20–40 minutes for the removal and storage of the M/D Cover's Center section. A closeout panel is typically installed around the inner perimeter of the two facing hatch beams, to mitigate the gradual collection of debris around the perimeter of the vestibule.

Detailed contingency operations, addressing both repair and preventive maintenance, were prepared in advance for the internally accessible components. Generalized procedures for pinpointing atmospheric leakage in the vestibule have existed since at least ISS Assembly Stage 4A, as have contingency installation procedures for all three sets of IVA seals. Reports of damage to CPA connectors (both on the ground and on orbit) led to the deployment of risk mitigation procedures on STS-126.

=== Deberthing ===
Removal of an Element essentially reverses the process of berthing. It varies by the specifics of how the vestibule was configured for operations. The most commonly encountered implementation starts with deoutfitting the vestibule when reconfiguring to deberth a logistics element a from Node Radial Port. The procedure was originally budgeted for two crew members and a duration of 4 hours. It removes items that cross the ACBM/PCBM interface plan (closeouts, utility jumpers, and grounding straps), installs CBM hardware essential to demate operations (e.g., CPA, thermal covers), and closes the hatch.

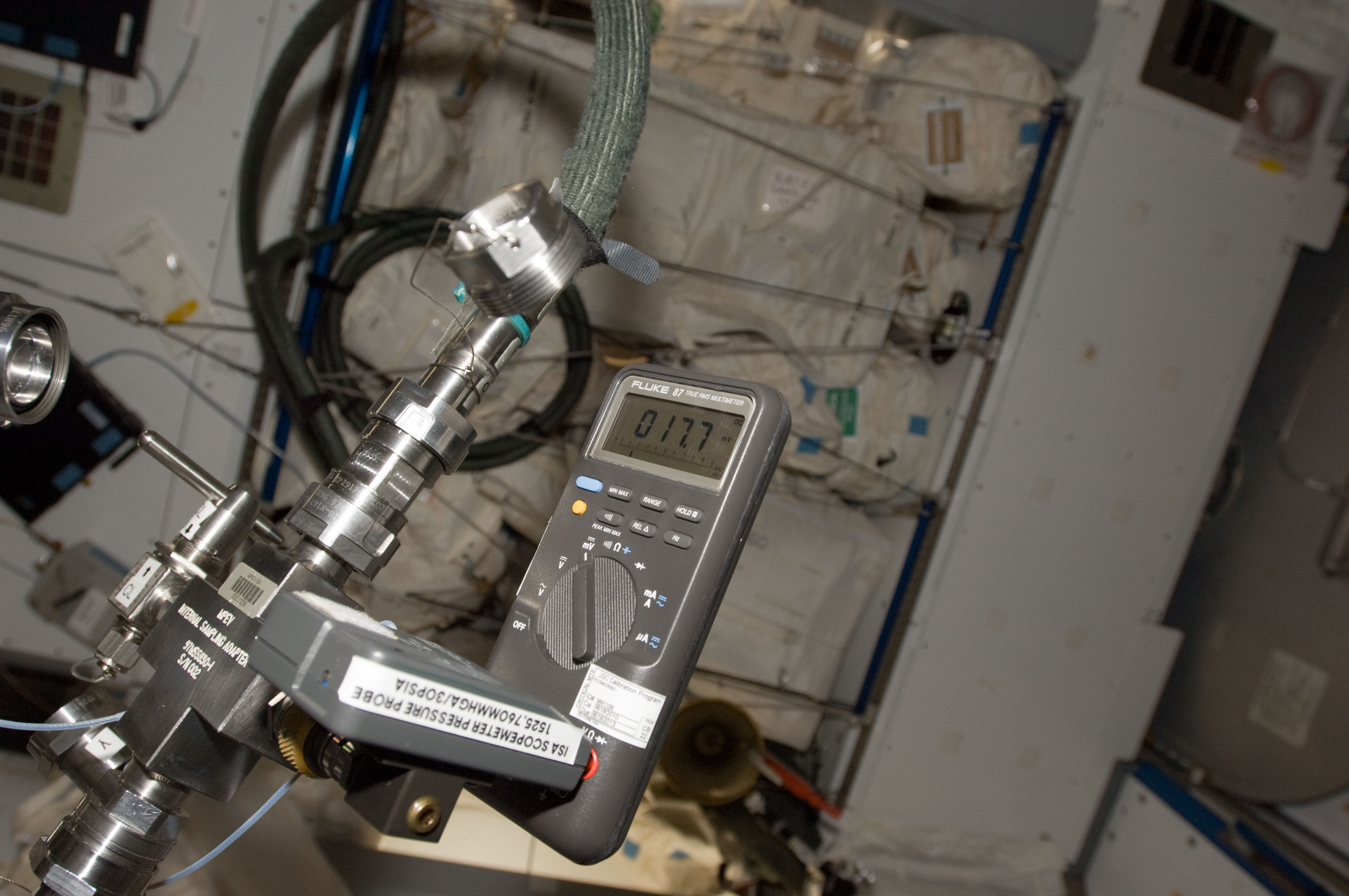
Equipment used to depressurize the vestibule between Node 2 and MPLM Raffaello during STS-135

Pressure decay testing equipment, including sensors and supporting electronics and a Vacuum Access Jumper 35 ft (11 m) in length, are subsequently installed on the inside of the hatch. With these in place, the vestibule is ready for a depressurization period of about 40 minutes, including dwell periods for leak check. The critical (absolute) pressure objective is 2 mmHg (267 Pa) in order to preclude damage to the CBM seals during the demate.

As in pre-berth preparation, supporting utilities are configured to provide for power and data to the CBM. Power is applied, two CPAs are selected for use as the Primary and Secondary master controllers, and the individual motor controllers are initialized. A "DBBoltck" command is issued to the Powered Bolts, and the Capture Latches are individually commanded to 212° shaft angle. The latches are then positioned to their nominal "capture complete" position of 12°. The CBM is either left in a "standby" condition, or powered down.

Post-deberth closing of the covers on Harmony's nadir CBM.

Release of the PCBM Element from the hard mated condition takes about 90 minutes. It begins with loosening of all 16 Powered Bolts by about 0.4 revolutions, taking less than five minutes. All 16 bolts are required to have a positive residual load after the step is complete. Sets of four bolts are then extracted completely, each set taking about 6:30 to reach a nominal position of 21.6 revolutions. RMS grapple and free drift Attitude Control are required to be in place before removal of the third set. After all 16 bolts have been extracted, the Capture Latches are deployed, allowing the compressed Ready-to-Latch Indicators to thrust against the PCBM's Alignment Guides. The departing element is maneuvered away by the RMS and, on Node Radial Ports, the Deployable M/D Covers are closed. The ACBM is then shut down by removing power from the CPAs.

Resolution for contingencies during demate are generally similar to those for preparation and execution of mating operations. Many of them effectively terminate with instructions for a contingency reberth to allow removal and replacement of CBM components. The effort to re-outfit the vestibule for de-berthing the CBM makes it generally unsuitable for emergency departure.

=== Opportunities ===
The original design of the ISS called for a Habitat element to be installed on the Nadir-facing port of Node 1 (Unity), and bulkhead penetrations were designed accordingly. As the station matured through the first phases of assembly, Node 3 was planned for that location. It later became apparent that installation on the port-side bulkhead would confer significant operational advantages. Unfortunately, the original routing of utilities inside Node 1 required significant re-work on orbit to enable the change. The large CBM diameter permitted the use of PMA3 as a pressure-containing closeout during the effort, so that feed-throughs could be removed and replaced without EVA. PMA3 was moved during Expedition 21 to the port-side CBM, and "...Potable Water, ISL & 1553 data cabling, and installing IMV [Inter-Modular Ventilation] ducting, cables and hoses..." were connected in preparation for the arrival of Node 3. The reconfigured bulkhead was tested for leakage before moving PMA3 back to its storage location, and Node 3 was installed in the newly prepared location on STS-130.

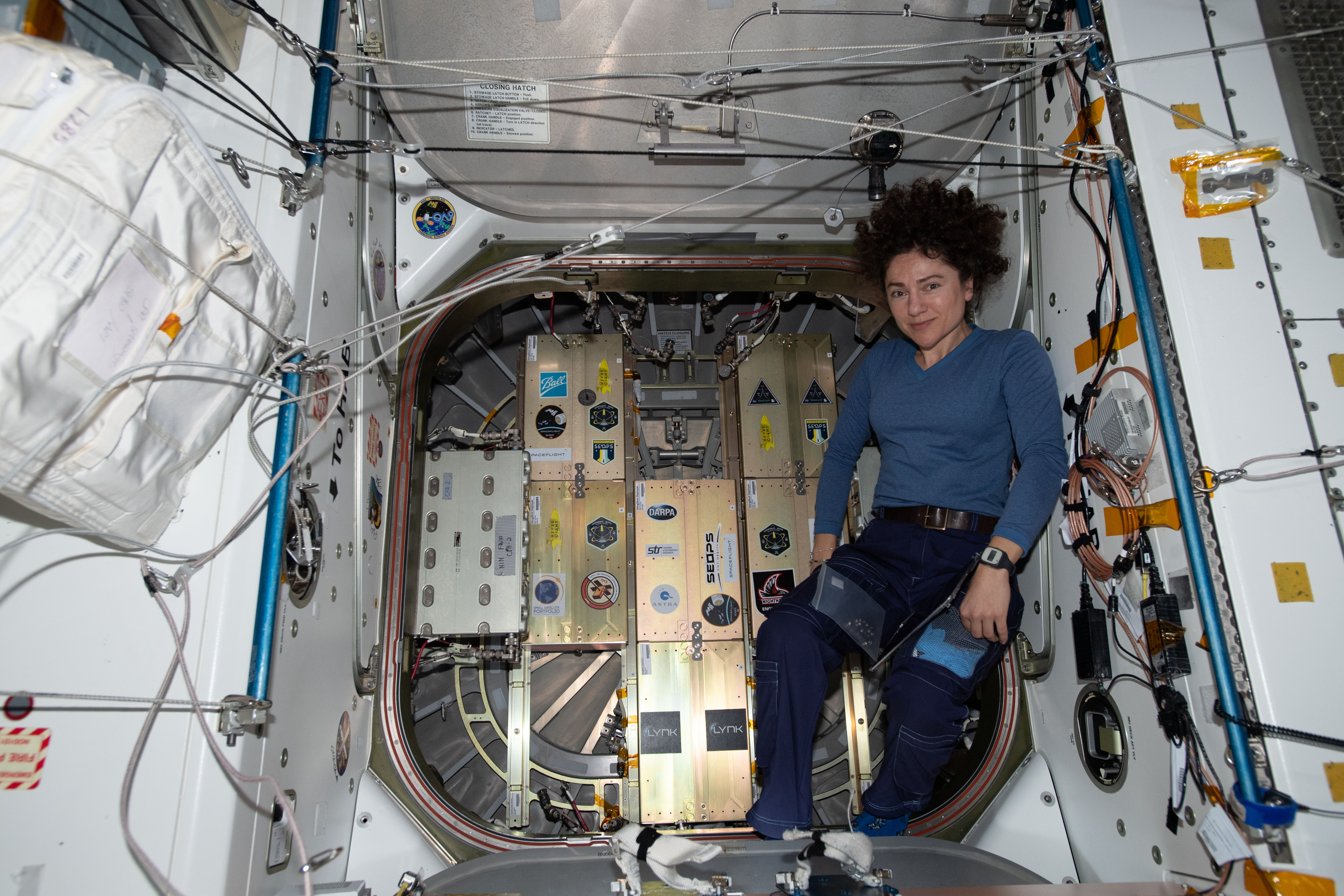
Expedition 61 Flight Engineer Jessica Meir poses in front of the SlingShot small satellite deployer loaded with eight CubeSats.

The depth, diameter, and accessibility of the CBM have also been exploited in support of dispensing CubeSats from the SlingShot deployment system. The framework mounts into the PCBM's interior envelope on logistics vehicles (e.g., Cygnus). The Bishop NanoRacks Airlock Module (NRAL) takes advantage of the robust interface between the ACBM and PCBM to repeatedly berth and deberth a "bell" hosting similar capability.

== Developmental history ==
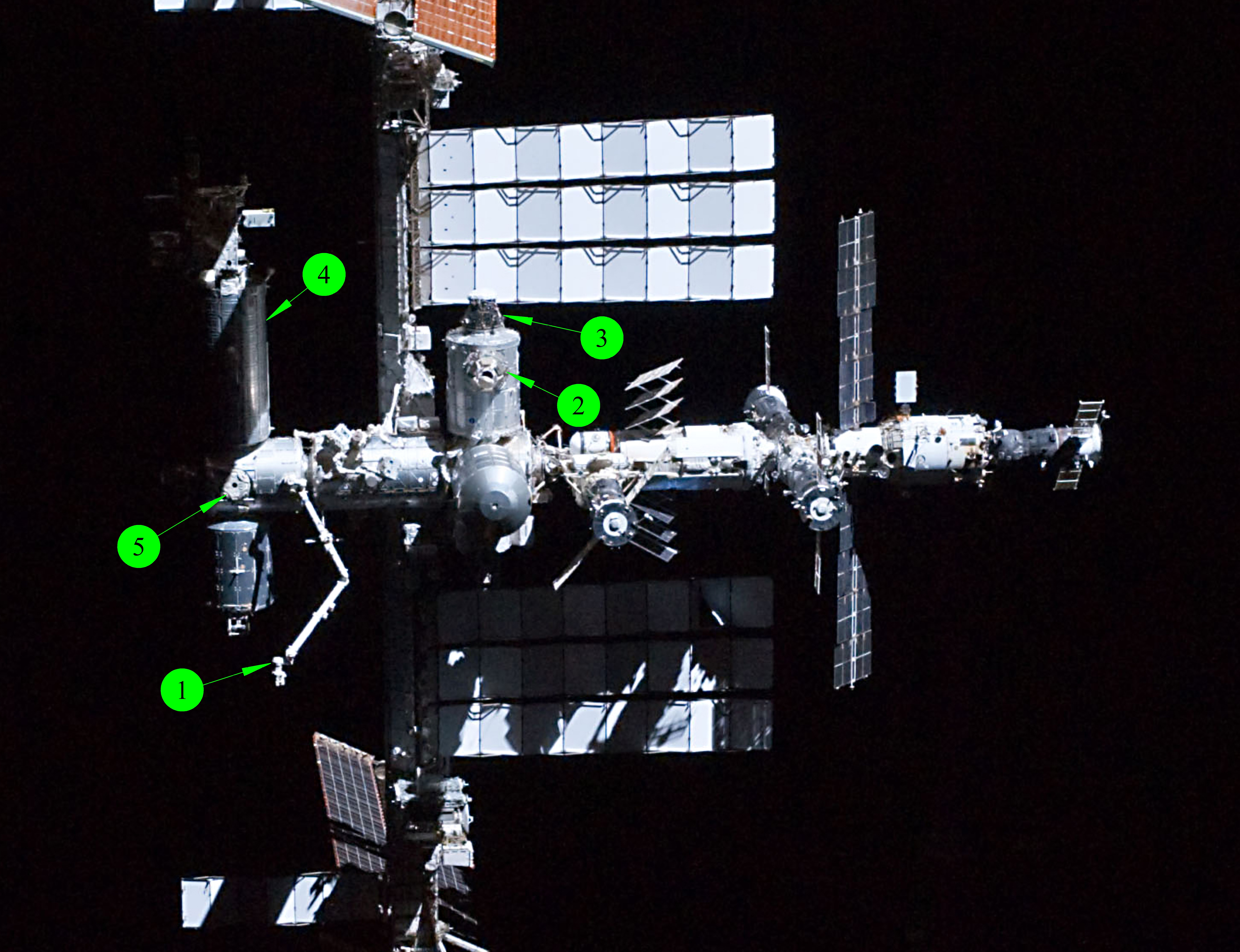
Major factors influencing the CBM were on display during the post-undock fly-around of the STS-135. The PCBM path during capture is induced by the RMS (1). The RMS interacts with modules ranging in weight from the Cupola (2) and the PMAs (3) to Kibō (4). The mass interacts with lighting to drive temperature differences between the CBM rings. This adds to pressure-induced deflections, especially for Radial Ports (5).

The US space program's concept of berthing was developed to mitigate issues of orbital mechanics that were encountered during the evolution of docking. Although not the first mechanism developed specifically for berthing, the CBM was the first such device designed in the US specifically to assemble structural joints that would hold sea-level pressure. It integrates four archetypical features:

1. Pressurized structures experience internal pressure in addition to their other primary loads. They are considered life critical when used as the pressure hull of a crewed compartment. In that context, they receive special attention for issues like loads, leak rate, seal redundancy, and verification practices. They also draw close scrutiny to the effects of their failure.
2. External flanges are subject to both mechanical loads and loads induced by pressure in their parent pressure vessels. The relative stiffness of the flange determines how the free end will change shape. Distortions must be accommodated when something is being attached at the flange.
3. Moving mechanical assemblies transmit forces differently as their posture changes. Their loads are influenced by internal friction, and often require more iterations of analysis and design than structures. In the case of CBM, the load path includes both the module and the RMS, so can be very complicated.
4. Structural joints that resist high vacuum are engineered to strictly limit gaps across the joint, and the conditions under which they are assembled are carefully managed. For the CBM, these issues are compounded during boltup by seal scrubbing as pre-berth deflections are conformed, and by any dust and debris trapped in the joint.

The use of these features on a spacecraft entails special considerations due to the aggressive environment. At the 255 nautical miles (472 km) typical ISS altitude, NASA identifies seven factors for that environment:

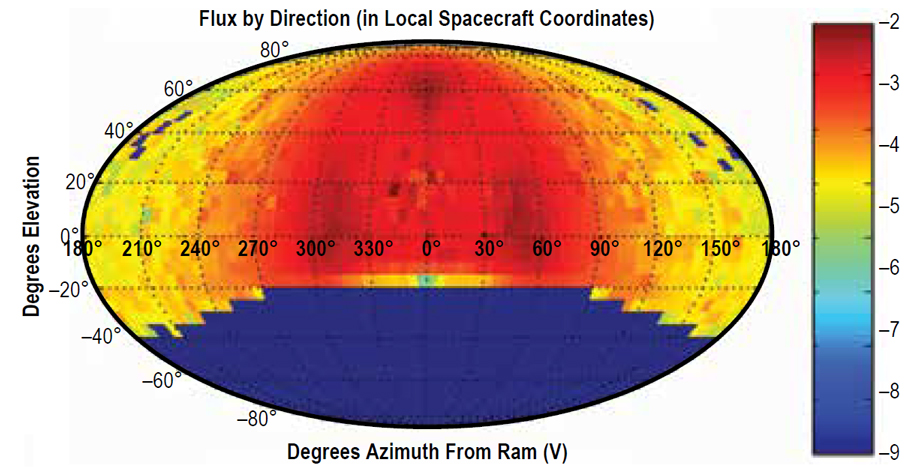
The meteoroid flux intensity hitting the CBM varies strongly with installed orientation.

1. The composition, properties, and condition of the ambient neutral atmosphere. In particular, atomic oxygen (AO) is highly corrosive to many materials. Elastomers, such as the PCBM's face seal, are particularly sensitive to AO. Low pressure and low absolute humidity also impact the coefficient of friction for many material combinations. Exposure to very low pressures also changes the chemical composition of certain materials over time.
2. Strongly directional sources and sinks of radiant energy. The mounting, optical properties, and insulation of exposed spacecraft components are engineered to maintain acceptable temperatures. In some cases, the orbital orientation of an entire spacecraft is dynamically controlled to mitigate these effects.
3. The geomagnetic field can interfere with sensitive electrical components (such as those of the ACBM's sensors, switches, and controllers). The effects can include outright failure as the components are carried through the field.
4. Ionized gasses that contaminate and charge exposed surfaces, of which the CBM has many. Most spacecraft deal with this issue by careful grounding of the exposed components.
5. Electromagnetic radiation that can alter the energy state of electrons in powered equipment. The motors, sensors, and control electronics such as those on the ACBM are susceptible to these effects unless shielded.
6. Meteoroids and orbiting debris, some of which can be both heavy and fast-moving, that can strike the spacecraft. Although the CBM design has been augmented several different ways in this regard, the issue was engineered at the integrated spacecraft level; quantitative requirements are not allocated in either CBM specification.
7. The balance between gravitational and centrifugal accelerations (often referred to as "zero gravity"), which has substantial implications for verifying the motion of mechanisms on the ground because gravity dominates there. CBM followed typical spacecraft engineering practice, iterating between analysis and test to develop and verify designs for this condition.

Several of these features and factors interacted through a long sequence of decisions about the station's orbit, configuration, plans for growth, launch vehicles, and assembly techniques. The berthing operation finds its origin in programs of the 1960s and 1970s as they explored the practicality of physics related to these issues. The CBM concept itself began to emerge with the first studies of the program in the early 1980s, experienced multiple iterations of concept, and completed development shortly before launch of the first flight element as the 1990s drew to a close.

=== Origins (prior to c. 1984) ===
The CBM is just one branch in the long evolution of the United States' ability to assemble large spacecraft. At least as early as the late 1950s, the capability had been recognized as "...necessary for building space stations and assembling vehicles in low Earth orbit...". By the end of the Apollo program, standardized rendezvous and docking practices to support it had been proven in practice. The basic challenges of propellant management were well understood, as were control stability and contamination issues resulting from the chase vehicle's propulsive RCS plumes hitting the target vehicle vehicle during proximity operations.

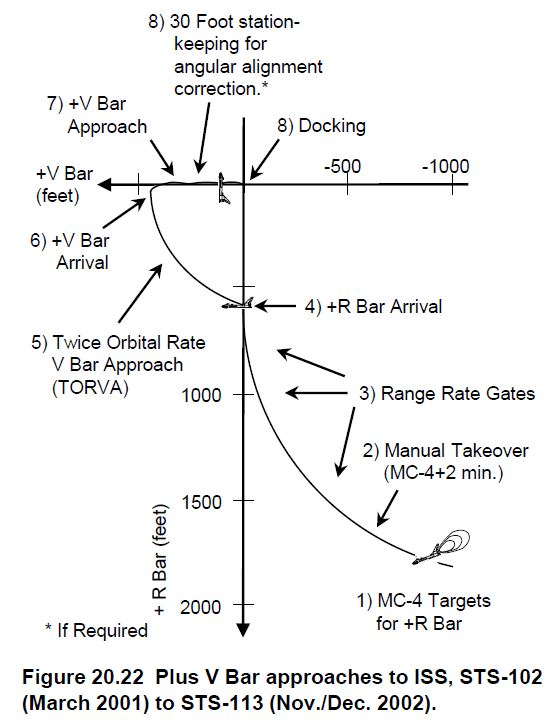
Docking operations often require complex maneuvers to avoid disturbing a target vehicle.

The advent of the Space Shuttle Program mitigated some issues with docking, but introduced new ones. Significant differences between the masses of chase and target vehicles provided for less equal sharing of momentum after contact, and the larger mass of the Shuttle required significantly more braking propellant than was needed during Apollo. Simple coaxial alignment between chase and target inertial properties during terminal approach operations was not possible with the asymmetric Orbiter, which was designed for aerodynamic lift during return from orbit. Impingement of large Shuttle RCS plumes on relatively small target vehicles also disturbed control over target orientation during proximity operations. These issues forced changes in braking strategy on the Shuttle program. Not all strategies were easily implemented in all orbital directions, which threatened the ability to assemble in some of those directions. The use of a long tele-robotic device (the RMS) reduced that threat by moving the point of first touch away from the chase vehicle.

By 1972, requirements analysis for the Shuttle Program estimated that almost 40% of mission objectives would involve assembly by placing a payload into the Orbiter's Payload Bay. It was envisioned at that time that many of the retrieved spacecraft would not be designed for such operations, further raising the importance of solving (or eliminating) issues with docking. The berthing operation was developed to do so: a requirement to gently grasp a nearby spacecraft with near-zero contact velocity was allocated to the Shuttle's planned RMS. Using the RMS to assemble objects on orbit was regarded as a driving requirement for accuracy in both position and orientation of the emerging system.

Although not foreseen at the time of RMS development, this period saw the emergence of requirement topics that would become important to the CBM: the accuracy and precision of RMS control, limitations on its ability to force things into alignment, and the magnitude of structural loads peaking in the booms and joints during capture. These proved to be crucial to the design, qualification, and operation of the mechanism's development.

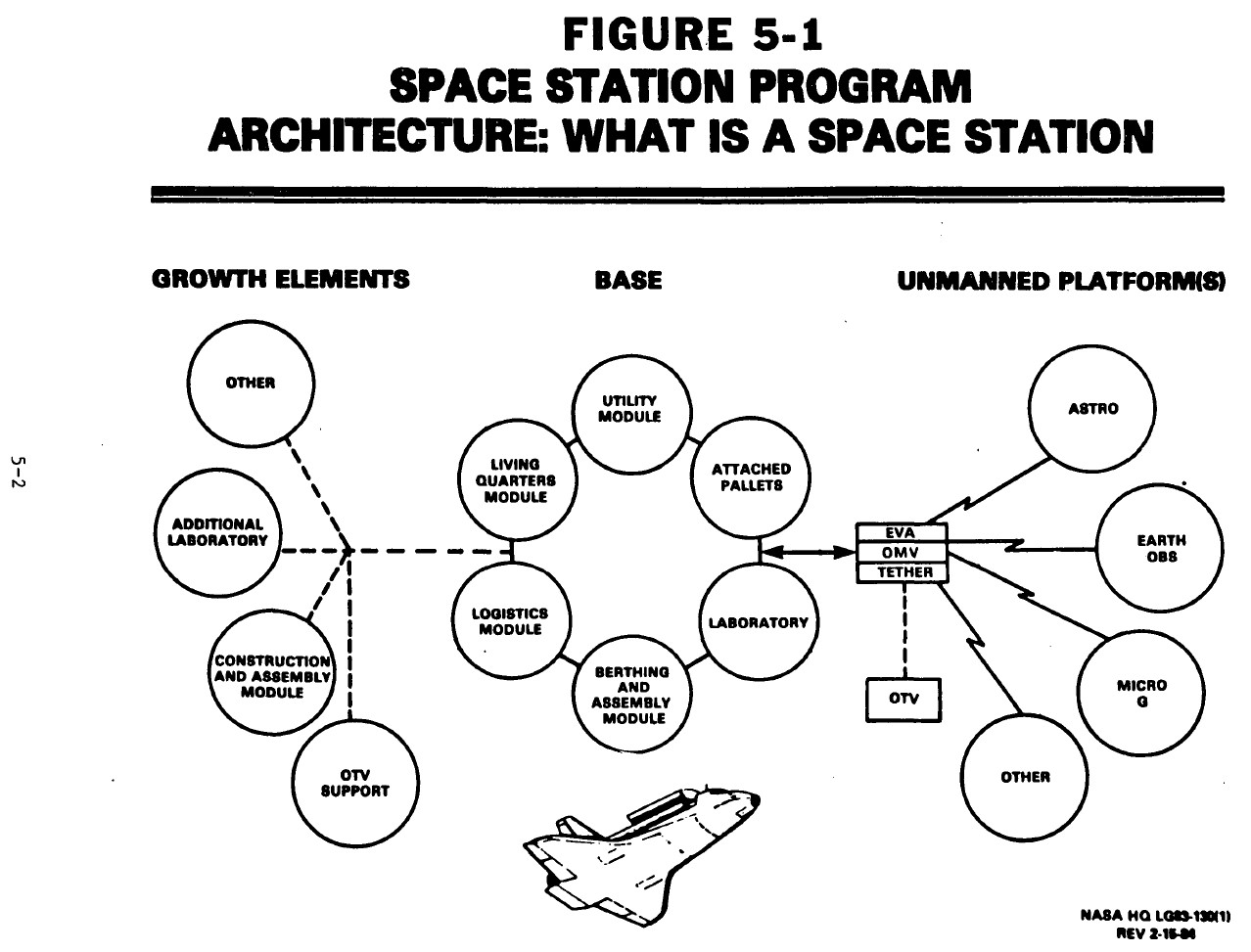
The Space Station Task Force identified berthing as a primary assembly technique.

The SRMS did not accomplish its first retrieval and payload bay berth until STS-7 in June, 1983. The date of first operation was two months after submission of final reports by the eight contractors of NASA's Space Station Needs, Attributes, and Architectural Options Study. Even though no flight results were available when the final study reports were written, at least three of them identified "berthing" as the primary means of assembling a Space Station from pressurized modules delivered in the Shuttle's payload bay. Of the concepts described and illustrated, none strongly resemble the eventual design of the CBM, and little discussion of the technical details is readily available.

In early 1984, the Space Station Task Force described a Berthing Mechanism that would attenuate the loads incurred when two modules were maneuvered into contact with each other, followed by latching. Contact conditions were identified as important, but were not quantified at that time. The same is true for the diameter of the internal passageway. Internal connection of utilities between the modules was explicitly required, as was "androgyny". A standardized Berthing Mechanism was perceived as an external flange on module ports, and a "6-port Multiple Berthing Adapter" roughly corresponded to the eventual Resource Node concept. Deflections induced by internal pressure acting on radially oriented ports of cylindrical modules became recognized as a critical developmental issue. The Task Force's final report also appears to be among the earliest references to "common...berthing mechanisms".

=== Advanced Development/Phase B (c. 1985 – c. 1988) ===
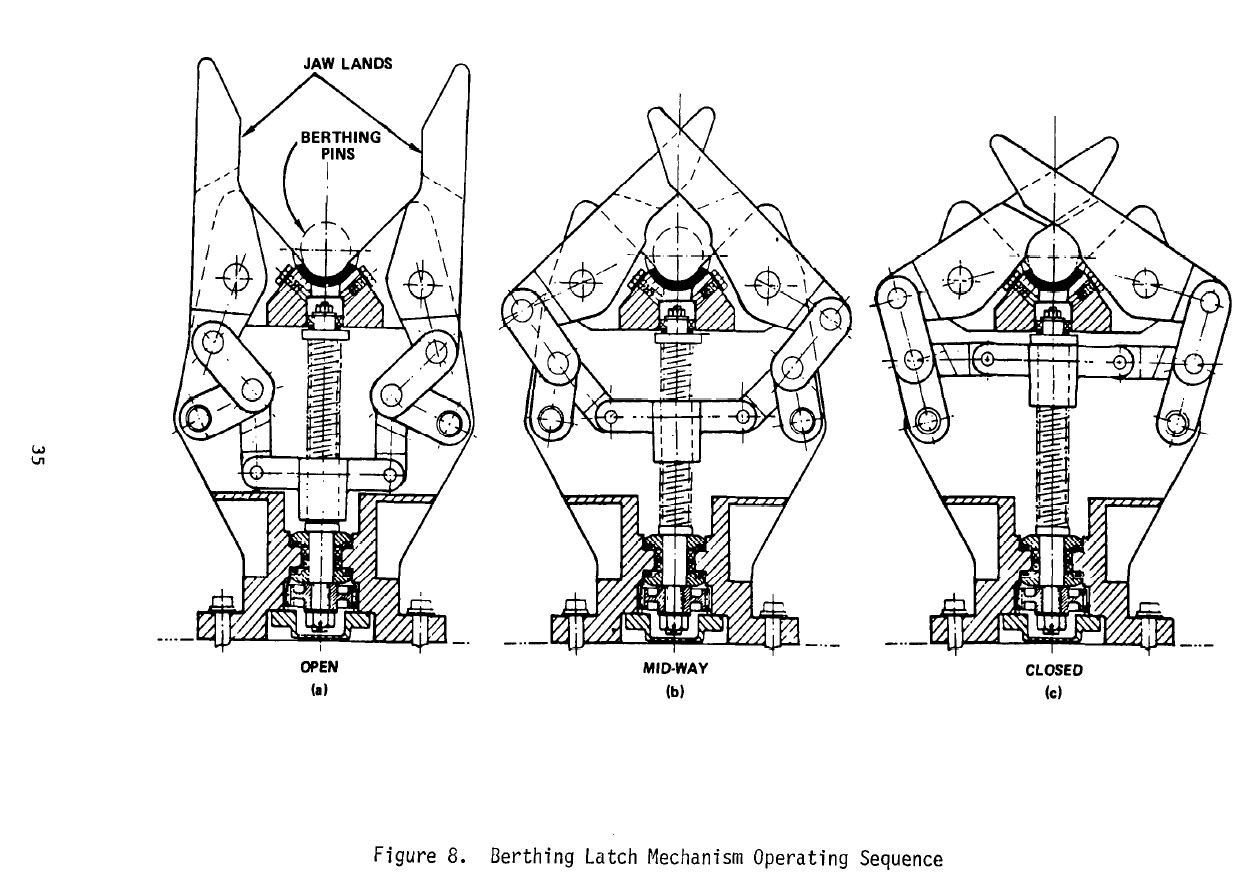
The berthing knowledge base grew throughout the 1980s as other berthing mechanisms were developed. These included systems such as the Flight Support Structure latch (seen here) and the Shuttle's Payload Deployment and Retrieval System.

In parallel with the on-going system-level configuration studies, NASA anticipated that concept development projects for advanced docking and berthing mechanisms "...to substantially reduce docking loads (velocities less than 0.1 ft/sec) and provide payload berthing capabilities...will be initiated beginning in Fiscal Year 1984."

The Berthing Mechanism Advanced Development program actually started in 1985, leading to full-scale testing in the Six-Degree-of-Freedom test facility at Marshall Spaceflight Center (MSFC). In that effort, "common" appears to have meant that a single family of mechanism designs accomplished both berthing and docking (inheriting the divergent requirements for both) and that any member of the family could join with any other member. "Active" and "passive" referred to whether mechanisms were provided for attenuation of residual kinetic energy after docking. Motor-deployed capture latches of two different designs (fast- and slow-acting, having short- and long-reach, respectively) were mounted on the outboard radius. Outward-oriented guide petals were also located on the outboard radius, giving the mechanism an overall diameter of about 85 inches.

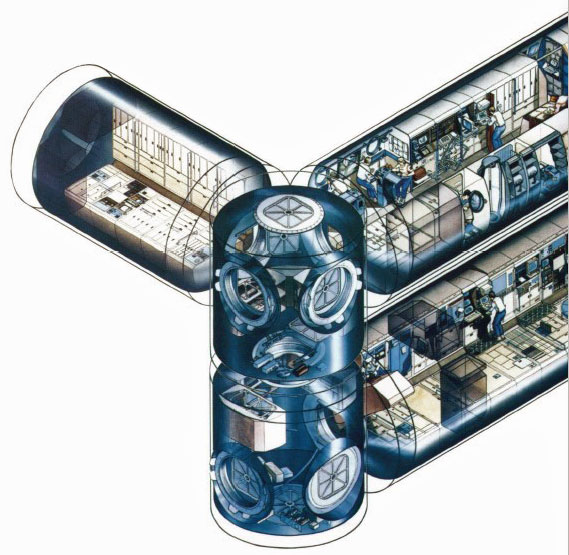
NASA Artist's Concept of Modules (January, 1989).

Structural latching was accomplished by a "bolt/nut structural latch" of 0.500 inch nominal diameter. Designed for a tensile load of 10,000 lbf (44,500 N), both the bolt and nut were fabricated from A286 steel, coated with a tungsten disulfide dry film lubrication as specified by DOD-L-85645. Bolt/nut locations alternated in orientation around the perimeter of the 63-inch diameter pressure wall and the faces of both rings included seals, so that the mechanism was effectively androgynous at the assembly level. The bolts were designed for manual actuation, using sealed drive penetrations through the bulkhead. An option for motorized torquing was identified, but not designed. The bolt could be tightened from either the head side, or the nut side. Neither the torque nor the uncertainty in preload are reported in the available documentation.

One of the study's four variants incorporated an aluminum bellows, allowing a loop of modules to be closed. Tension loads caused by internal pressure were carried across the bellows by a continuous cable loop threaded through 47 pulleys arrayed around the outside of the bellows. Not all of the issues with the bellows design appear to have been fully resolved by the end of the developmental test series.

Although the dimensions accommodated internal utility connections and a 50-inch square hatchway, the mechanism envelope had limited compatibility with the eventual recessed Radial Port locations on USOS Resource Nodes. The apparent incompatibility with Radial Port locations might be explained by the as-yet unstable configuration of the Nodes, being shown as spherical 10-ports modules in some configurations, but cylindrical 3-port modules in others. Many other features of the baseline station configuration of the time also appear quite different from the eventual ISS.

=== Space Station Freedom (c. 1989 – c. 1992) ===
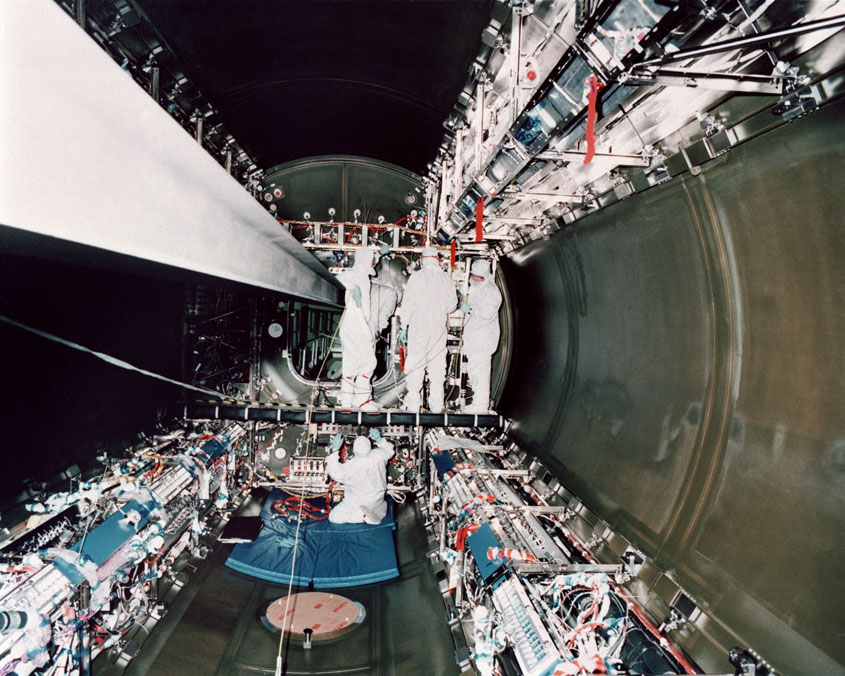
The four "stand-offs", seen here during assembly of the US Laboratory Module "Destiny", provide space for utility (power, data, etc.) distribution to the racks. This architectural approach was the genesis of the CBM's large diameter.

As 1990 approached, the size of the CBM had been stabilized by a specific engineering approach to the design of modules. Indirectly constrained by the circular cross-section of the NSTS Payload Bay, the internal volume of the module was divided into eleven regions. A center aisle running the length of the module is surrounded by four banks of equipment. The equipment banks meet along four lines running nearly the full length of the pressure shell. Immediately outboard of those points, wedge-shaped utility volumes run parallel to the aisle. The utility runs allow them to be tapped from many stations along their length. Other equipment, some of which facilitated utility connection between modules after they are mated on orbit, is more efficiently packaged in the endcone volumes than in the cylindrical portion of the module. Penetrations for these utility runs to connect between modules received significant attention in the layout of the vestibule and, therefore, of the CBM.

Each bank of equipment was divided into "racks" of standard size that could be installed on orbit in order to repair, upgrade or extend the station's capability. Racks holding related equipment could be integrated and acceptance tested on the ground before launch. This approach to integration facilitated a higher level of verification than would have been available using replacement of smaller components, providing for "...easy reconfiguration of the modules over their life span of 30 years." It also permitted the architecture to accommodate the subsequent change in orbital inclination by moving some of the heavy racks off the initial launch of the module. The distinctive size and shape of both the common hatch and CBM enabled this concept of module integration because they permitted movement of the large racks into, and out of, the modules while on orbit.

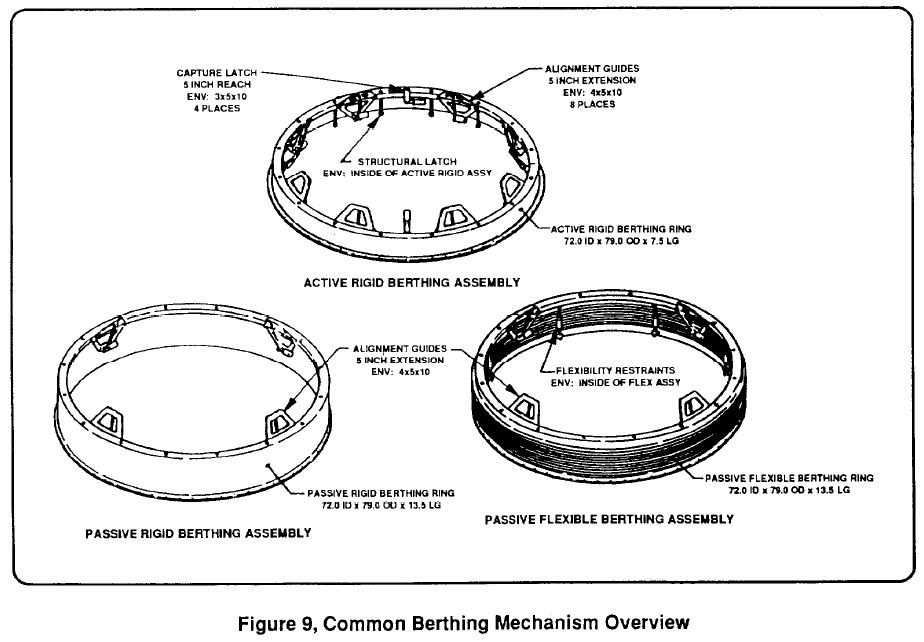
Three CBM configurations for the Space Station Freedom program, contemporary with detailed illustrations in Illi (1992) and Winch & Gonzalez-Vallejo (1992).

Other system-level decisions in this time frame also affected the eventual design of the CBM. The idea of a "common" mechanism for both docking and berthing appears to have been discarded, and major mechanisms specific to each of those distinct operations were identified. The concept of a "common" module pressure shell with a range of Radial Port configurations, still being studied by NASA at least as late as 1991, was discarded in favor of dedicated "Resource Nodes" having four Radial Ports near one end of a cylindrical pressure shell. Closure of the "module pattern" was deferred from the initial system-level design by 1992, eliminating the bellows-based variant of the PCBM.

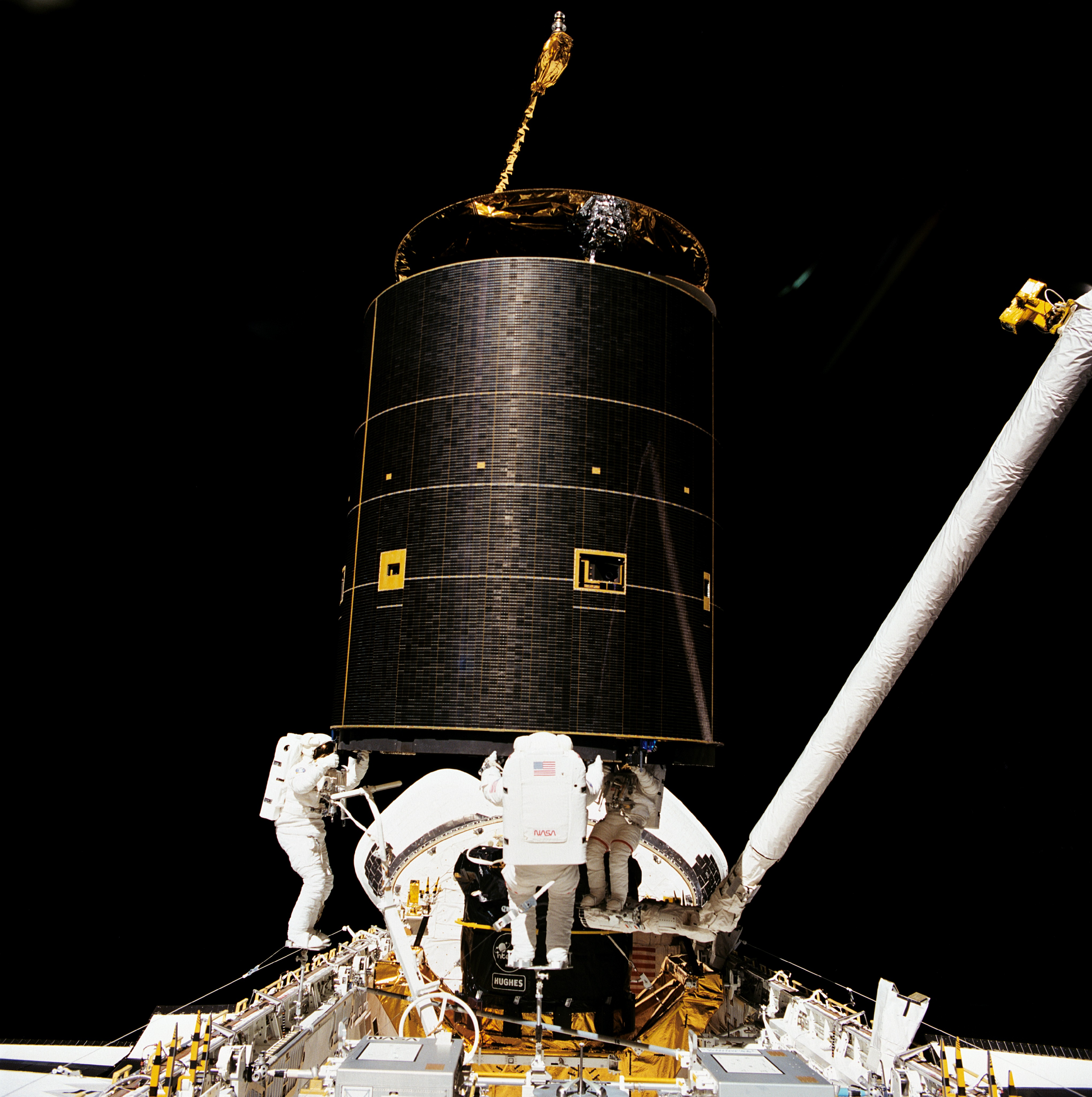
Berthing concepts evolved in parallel with CBM development. Seen here is the six-handed contingency "capture" of Intelsat 603 during EVA 3 of STS-49 in 1992.

By the early 1990s, a more detailed picture of the CBM began to emerge. The initial release of the PCBM development specification was in October 1991, followed by that of the CBM/PE ICD in February, 1992 and the ACBM development specification in January, 1993. Several elements of the Advanced Development concept were retained with little change. The bolt/nut structural latch and 4-bar capture latches remained, although the bolt diameter had increased to 0.625 inches (15.9 mm). Both the bolts and the capture latches were motorized with manual backup being available, although the individual mechanisms were still driven by way of sealed couplings that passed through the bulkhead. The term "active" had evolved to mean the co-location of all powered devices on the side of the interface already present on orbit when the mating operation took place.

Other features had been changed more significantly since the Advanced Development concept. "Androgyny" had been discarded: all 16 bolts were collected on the same side of the CBM/CBM interface, and the nut side was no longer described as being drivable. An 8-channel multiplexing motor controller could be remotely switched between latches, with two controllers required for each module having an ACBM. Differential pressure sensors had been included to monitor potential leak locations. Until it was cancelled, the Passive Flexible CBM still had an aluminum bellows, but the cable/pulley concept had been replaced by a set of 16 powered struts, driven by the multiplexing motor controller. The CBM/CBM seal design was a "face" design, on one side of the interface only. Alignment guides were deployable, and their orientation was reversed to face inward. The four capture latches had acquired friction clutches, allowing them to be back-driven.

New features emerged in this time frame. A debris cover had been added to the ACBM concept. It was a full-diameter unit of a single piece, removed and replaced with the RMS. Attachment of the rings to their bulkheads had been defined as a 64-bolt pattern, but no differentiation of the bolt pattern is mentioned in any of the sources. A shear tie had been added to the design to carry loads parallel to the CBM/CBM interface plane.

=== Transition to ISS (1993 – c. 1996) ===
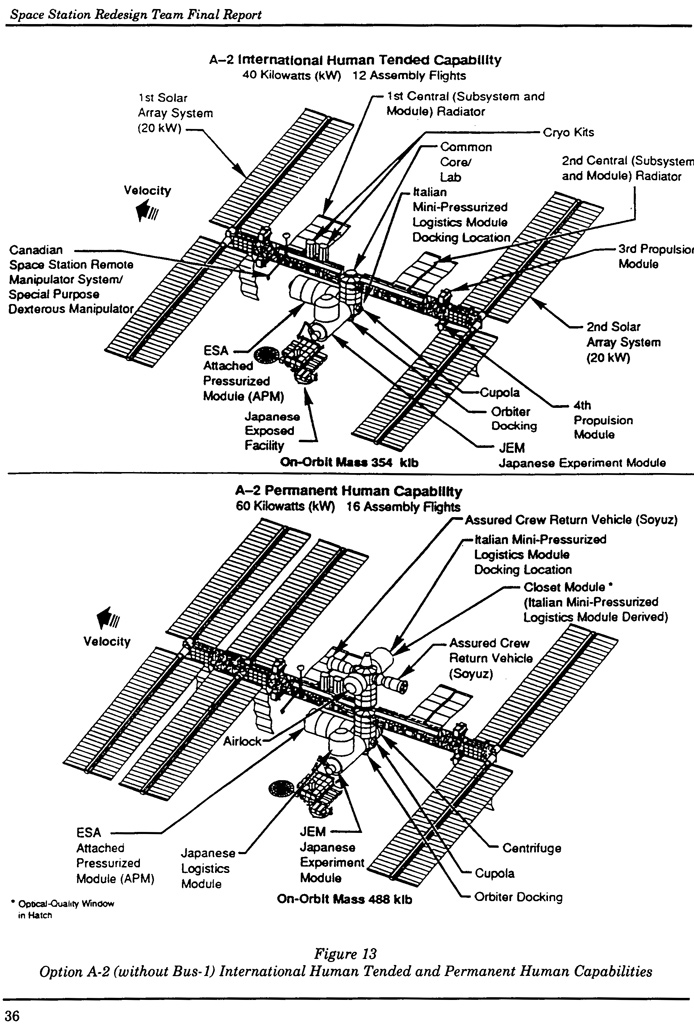
Features of the as-flown ISS can be discerned in the Space Station Redesign Task Force's Option A-2.

By December 1990, Space Station Freedom's cost estimate had risen from the 1984 estimate of $8 billion to reach $38 billion. Although the estimate was reduced to $30 billion by March of the following year, calls to restructure or cancel the program were prominent in Congress. In March 1993, NASA Administrator Dan S. Goldin communicated that President Clinton wanted "...the current Space Station redesigned as part of a program that is more efficient and effective...[to]...significantly reduce development, operations, and utilization costs while achieving many of the current goals...".

The redesign team submitted their final report in June 1993, describing three distinct space station concepts. Each concept was assessed at orbital inclinations of 28.5 and 51.6 degrees to expose any issues of support from the US and Russian launch complexes, respectively. None of the three configurations precisely matches the design of the ISS as it exists today, although some of them bore strong resemblance to the eventual configuration. The CBM was the only explicitly identified structural/mechanical subsystem included in all options at all inclinations. An increased exploitation of vestibule volume for utility connections was recommended for all options in order to decrease EVA time. Removal of automated controllers, motors, and latch mechanisms was conceptually identified as an option for one of them.

The specific conceptual designs that emerged from the Task Force were soon overcome by events. By late 1994, the US, Russia, and International Partners agreed in principle to merge their national efforts into a single "international [sic] Space Station" project. The cooperation led to hybridized assembly operations such as installation of the docking module atop the Orbiter Docking System on STS-74. This blurred common distinctions between berthing and docking, being positioned by the RMS but actuated by Orbiter thruster firings.

Both CBM specifications were completely re-written in 1995 (PCBM) and 1996 (ACBM) as part of the transition process. This period also saw the splitting of the ICD into dedicated Part 1 (interface requirements) and Part 2 (physical and functional definition) at Revision D (June 1996). By the time a final framework for the international effort was contractually established in December 1996, the first CBM simulators had already been delivered to NASA.

=== Qualification (c. 1994 – 1998) ===
Having been specified independently, compliance for most requirements of the ACBM and PCBM was verified separately. In addition to assembly-level activities for the ACBM and PCBM, compliance data were generated for subassemblies such as the Capture Latch, Powered Bolt, Powered Bolt Nut, and Ready to Latch Indicator. For example, the Powered Bolt and Nut functionality was qualified by component-level tests that included ambient functional, random vibration, thermal vacuum, and, for the bolt, thermal cycle. Load tests at the yield and ultimate static conditions were conducted at the component level, as were dynamic conditions. The success criteria for these tests were generally based on the torque required to establish and relieve preload, on electrical continuity, and on the accuracy of the bolt's load cell.

In contrast, at least 11 specified verification activities required conjoint verification of mating and/or demating the two sides. Of those, five called for analysis validated by test and/or demonstration that required a specific combination of circumstances and interfaces. For example, the specifications directed capture to be qualified "...by analysis under dynamic loads imposed by the SRMS and SSRMS...validated by assembly-level test that includes variation of performance resulting from temperature and pressure on the ACBM and PCBM and on their interfacing structures." Boltup analyses of the ACBM/PCBM interface, and subsequent leakage, required similar validation by element- and assembly-level tests that included the distorting effects of pressure and temperature. End-to-end demonstrations were also required at the assembly level to verify "...mechanical functionality...without interruption from accomplishment of ready-to-latch indication and capture."

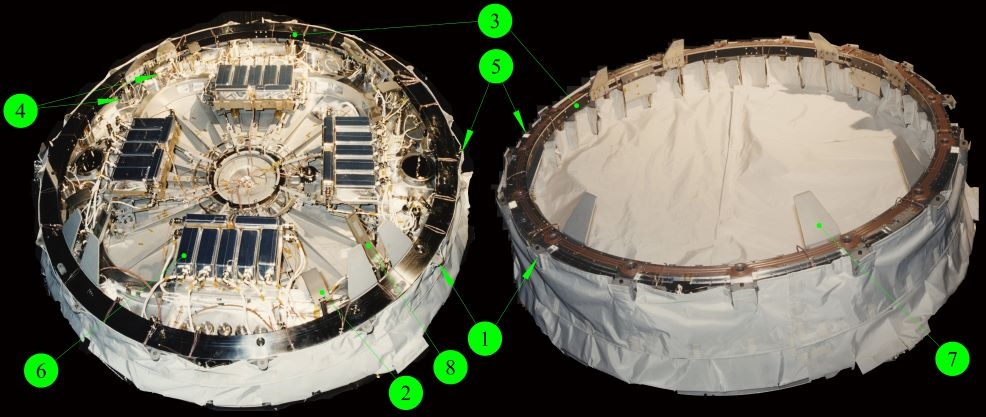
Although the 1993 station redesign advertised few CBM design changes, several had been introduced by the time of the Thermal Balance test, including Thermal Standoffs and Strike Plates (1), Ready-to-Latch (RTL) Indicators (2), covers for IVA Seal lands (3), external actuators (4), Alignment Pins and Sockets (5), and dedicated controllers (6). The RTL, Alignment Guides (7) and Capture Latches (8) had not yet reached flight configuration.

Imposing the combined effects of capture dynamics and distortions required iterations of analysis and validating test for each aspect. The dedicated test setup was developed in three parallel threads:

- Contact dynamics analysis of early CBM versions had begun by 1992, and was incorporated into MSFC's RMS Model for use in Boeing's CBM model development tests. The model was based on the "method of soft constraints", assessing "...intersection or penetration between the corresponding surfaces and calculating mutually perpendicular forces proportional to the depth of penetration". Preliminary model validation testing for these "rebound" forces and subsequent accelerations was conducted in MSFC's Contact Dynamics Laboratory from 1992 through at least 1997. The loads were locally linearized and imposed on the back end of a PCBM test article in the conjoint tests and demonstrations by a counter-balanced "Resistive Load System" suspended from the top of MSFC's V20 Vacuum Chamber.

- Temperature predictions were based on standard thermal analysis modeling techniques. The model was validated by stand-alone thermal balance testing of both assemblies at AEDC's 12V Thermal Vacuum/Solar Simulation Chamber in 1995/96. These ensured use of the correct interface conductances, internal re-radiation, and internal thermal capacitances. Validation was supported by select contact conductance testing, reducing the number of variables to be resolved in thermal balance. Temperatures were imposed during assembly-level qualification testing by a combination of strip heaters, cryogenic shrouds, and direct LN_{2} Injection.

- Pressure-induced deflections of pressurized elements were estimated by finite element modeling of their primary pressure shells, which led to validating pressure tests in mid-1996. For CBM assembly-level testing, the 16 foot (4.9 m) Active Pressure Vessel (APV) emulated boundary conditions on a flight-like radial port berthing plate. Emulation used 32 external structural doublers ranging in thickness from 0.125–1.00 inch (3.2–25.4 mm), 32 internal struts and 16 pneumatic actuators to tailor stiffness, constrain deflections, and apply local radial loads, respectively. The simpler 9 foot (2.7 m) Passive Pressure Vessel emulated an axial port. Manufacturing of the APV overlapped with discovery of negative margins in the design of Node 1 radial berthing plates. Redesign of the plate could not be accommodated in the APV's manufacturing schedule. It was compensated for by the relative rotation of nut acquisition commands during test.

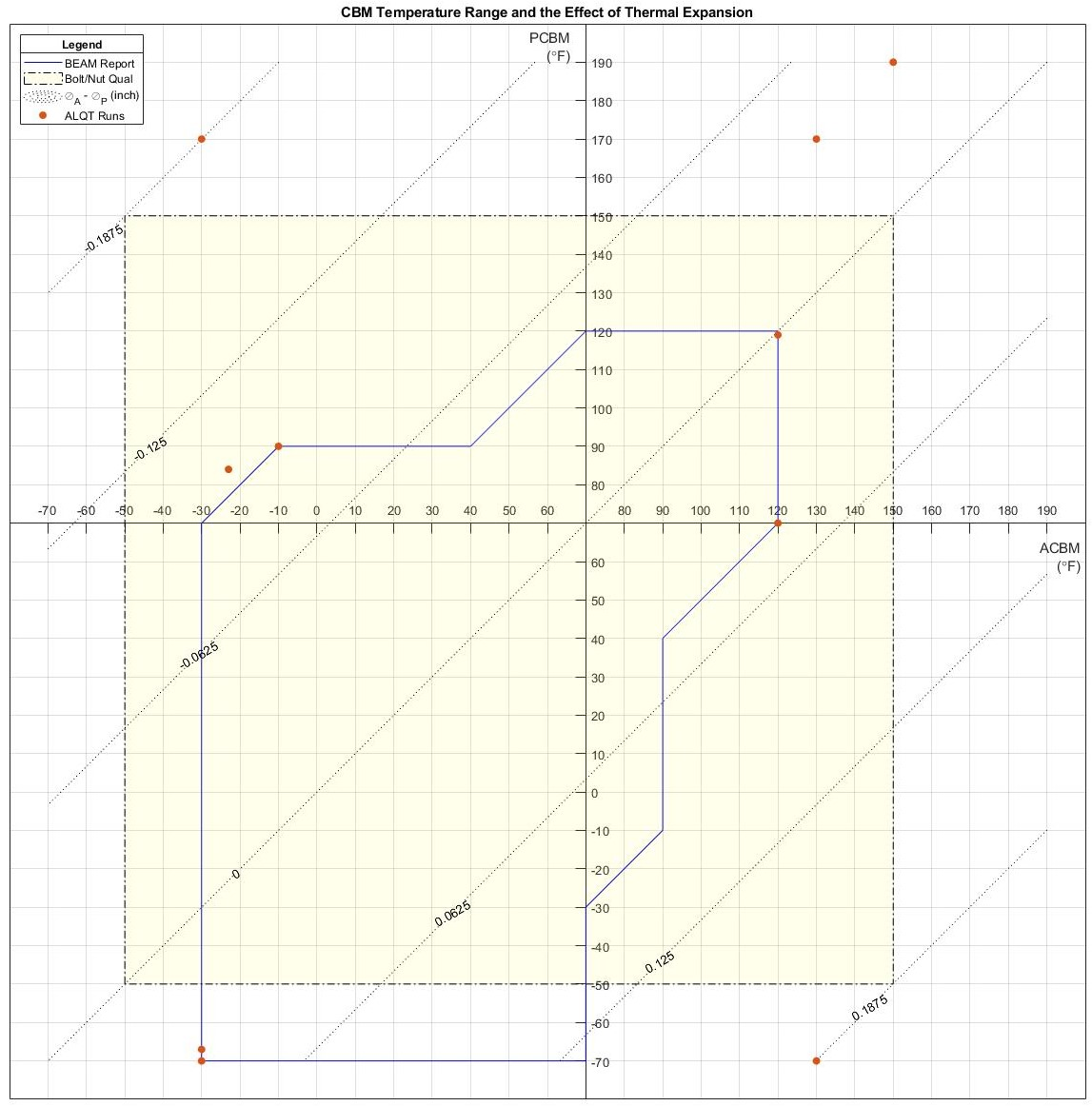
Reported Qualification temperature ranges for CBM Operation, which are strongly influenced by exposure to sunlight, earth, and deep space backgrounds.

Setup for the assembly level test began with chamber modifications in August 1996, with the two pressure vessels being delivered for characterization testing in December. Integrated checkout of the assembled setup in the V20 chamber began with baseline testing of developmental CBM hardware in August 1997, and was completed in November of that year. Formal testing ran in three phases from February to September 1998:

Phase A executed 62 boltup cycles under a range of atmospheric and temperature conditions to evaluate leak rates and Powered Bolt/Nut life cycle.

Phase B ran 35 partial cycles (capture and nut acquisition) under an expanded range of temperature conditions.

Phase C conducted five round-trip demonstrations under "challenge" conditions: extreme temperature differentials combined with PCBM positions more distant than those previously executed in hardware.

No leak test was ever failed in this test. The contact dynamics model correlated to the test results with high statistical confidence and was shown to have no discernable sensitivity to deflections. Wear-out signatures for the Powered Bolt were identified and validated, and several integration issues were identified and resolved through minor re-designs. Significant issues with test-specific off-loading of gravitational effects were encountered, ultimately leading to changes in flight procedures. Nominal and contingency procedures were investigated and, in some cases, extensively revised prior to flight operations.

Tests were subsequently conducted in the facility to qualify the IVA seals, and to support resolution of mission operations issues about bolt reach, contact corridors for alignment, RTL clearance, M/D Cover clearance, and RTL activation. The facility also provided real-time support for the first three flight uses of the CBM to assemble the ISS on orbit.

=== Field modifications (c. 2000 – present) ===
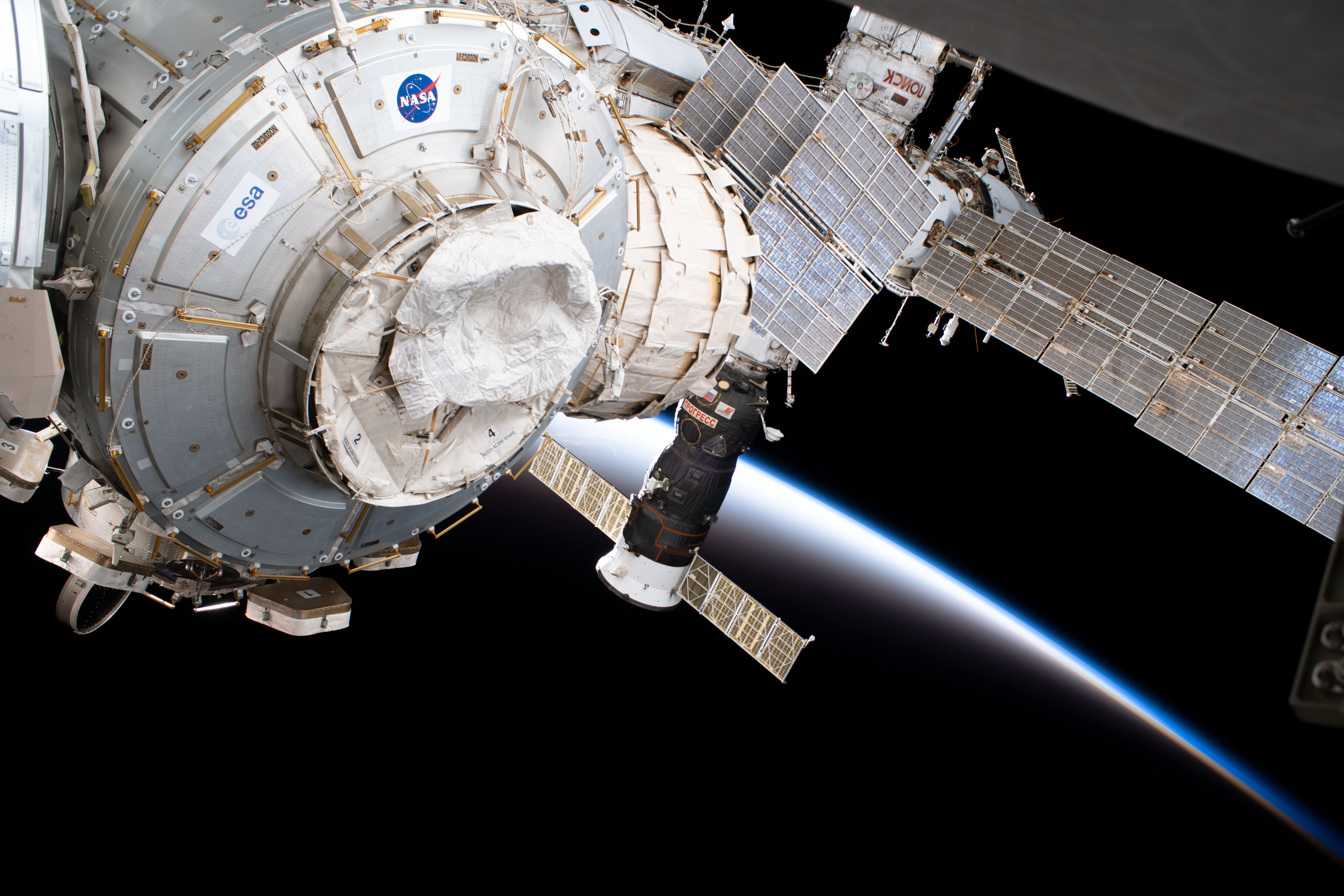
The protective cover configuration on the unpopulated axial ACBM of Node 3 is unique to that location.

- The decision to install Node 3 on the port-facing CBM of Node 1, instead of the originally planned Nadir-facing orientation, resulted in "...a unique circumstance: an exposed axial port berthing mechanism. Because this had never been planned for, a new design was developed...similar to the forward facing radial port...to provide a deployable shield to cover the exposed areas." The unique covers were installed during EVA #4 of Expedition 50.
- In late 2017 and early 2018, modifications were made to the attachment of CPAs to the hatch beams on two Nadir-facing ports. These modification allowed for rotation of CPAs "...into the vestibule rather than requiring that the crew remove them completely after a vehicle arrives. This will save both crew time and stowage space during a berthed mission. The CPAs must be installed for proper CBM operation during berthing activities, but they obstruct the pathway into the vehicle once the hatch is opened, so they need to be moved out of the corridor prior to cargo operations."

== Galleries ==
=== Design ===
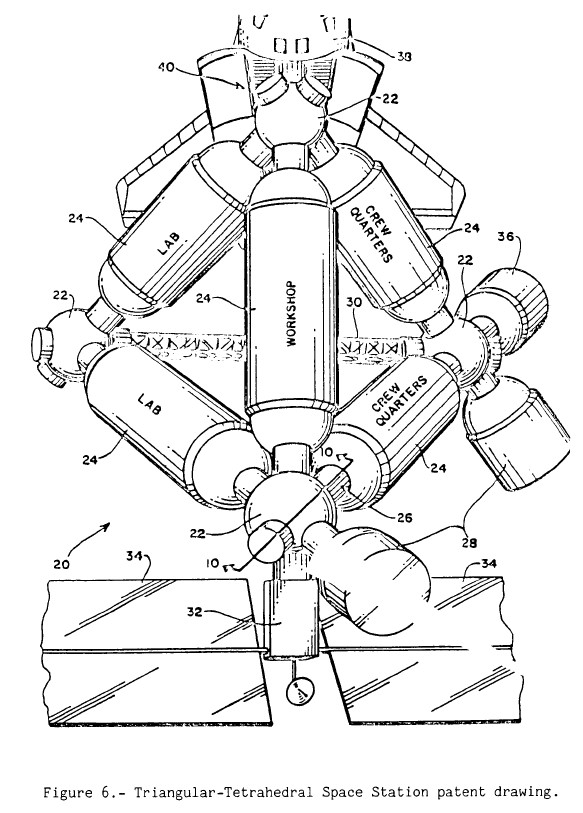
Module pattern configuration studies continued during the Advanced Development phase. The quasi-spherical nodes of some options, such as the Triangular Tetrahedral pattern shown here, would have had significantly different implications for CBM development. See Smith, et al. (2020) §V for a discussion of how the radial port (and CBM) are influenced by the pressure shell design.

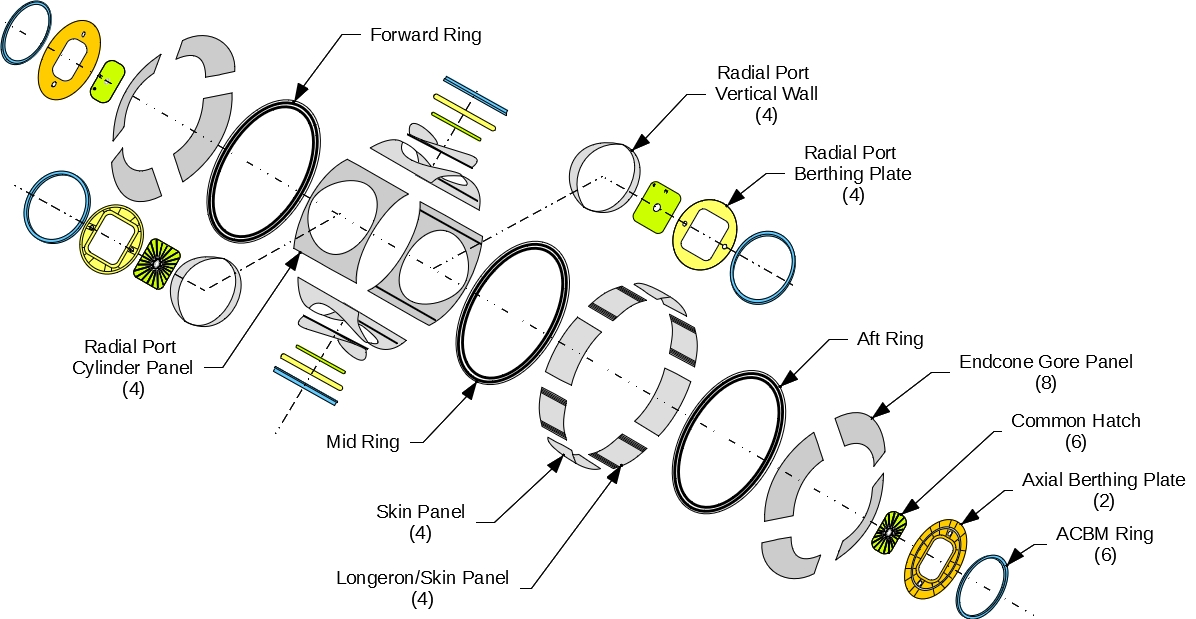
Major elements of the pressure-containing primary structure of ISS' Node 1 Unity. The ACBM rings act as external flanges on the berthing plates (bulkheads) when no PCBM is present. See Zipay, et al. (2012) for an extensive discussion of the pressure shell.

The size of the CBM interacts with the radial orientation to produce the deflections in this artist's rendering. Although shown for clarity at the ACBM's "outboard" flange in this artist's rendering, these deflections actually apply where the ACBM's ring is bolted to the Pressurized Element (with the ring installed). They are "conformed" when the two halves of the CBM are bolted together at "hard mate".

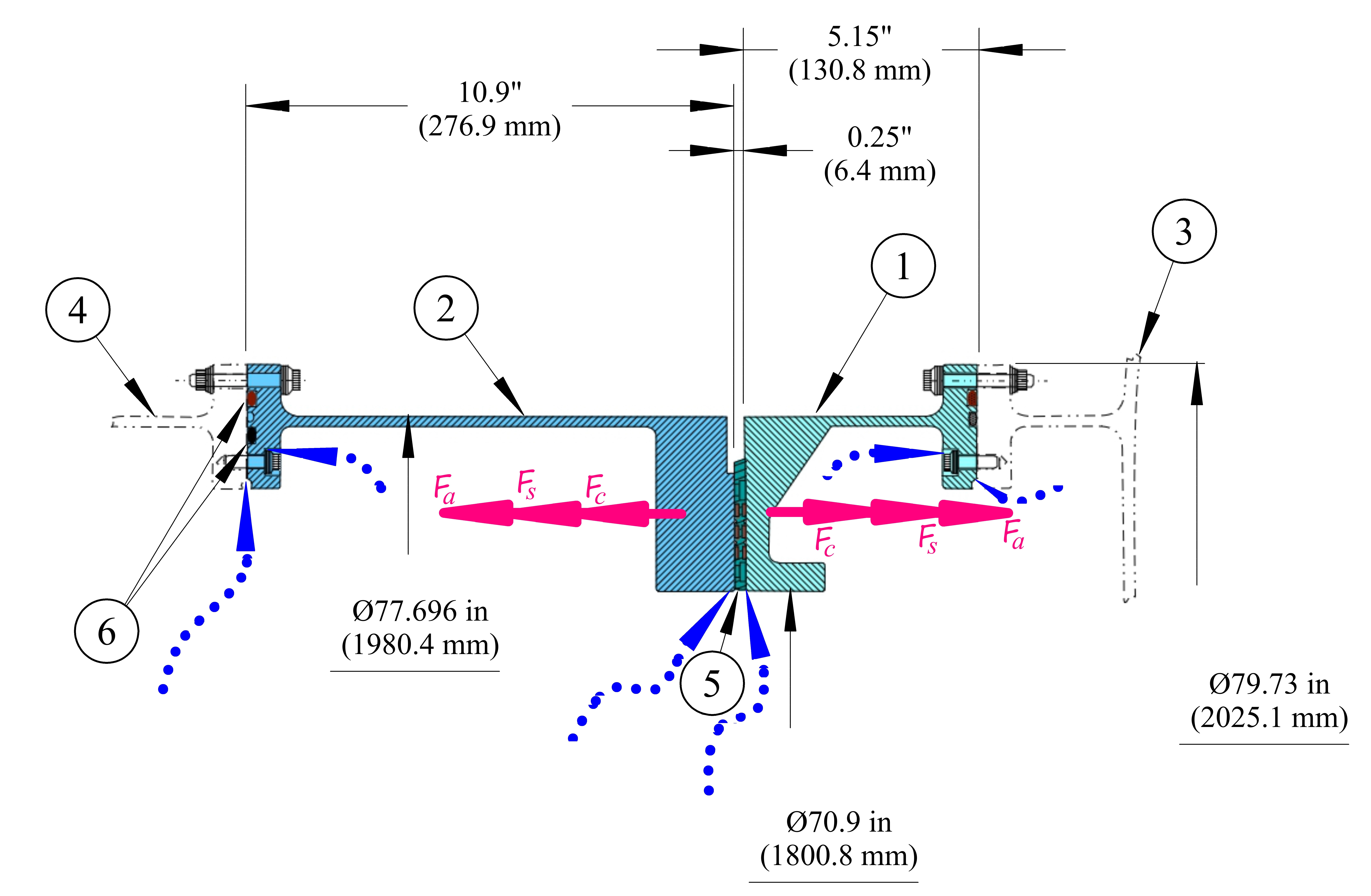
A vestibule is composed of an ACBM ring (1) mounted to a flanged bulkhead (3) and a PCBM ring (2) mounted to a flanged bulkhead or barrel section (4). The rings, both machined from 2219 Aluminum forgings, mate at a "molded seal" (5); each ring is sealed at its inboard end by a pair of concentric o-rings (6). Shown here "mid-span" between the Powered Bolt locations, three internal loads try to pry the joint open: atmospheric pressure (F_{a}) (15.2 psia), seal compression (F_{s}) and flange conformance (F_{c}). This artist's rendering of a generic cross-section also shows (in blue) where air can leak to the vacuum of space.

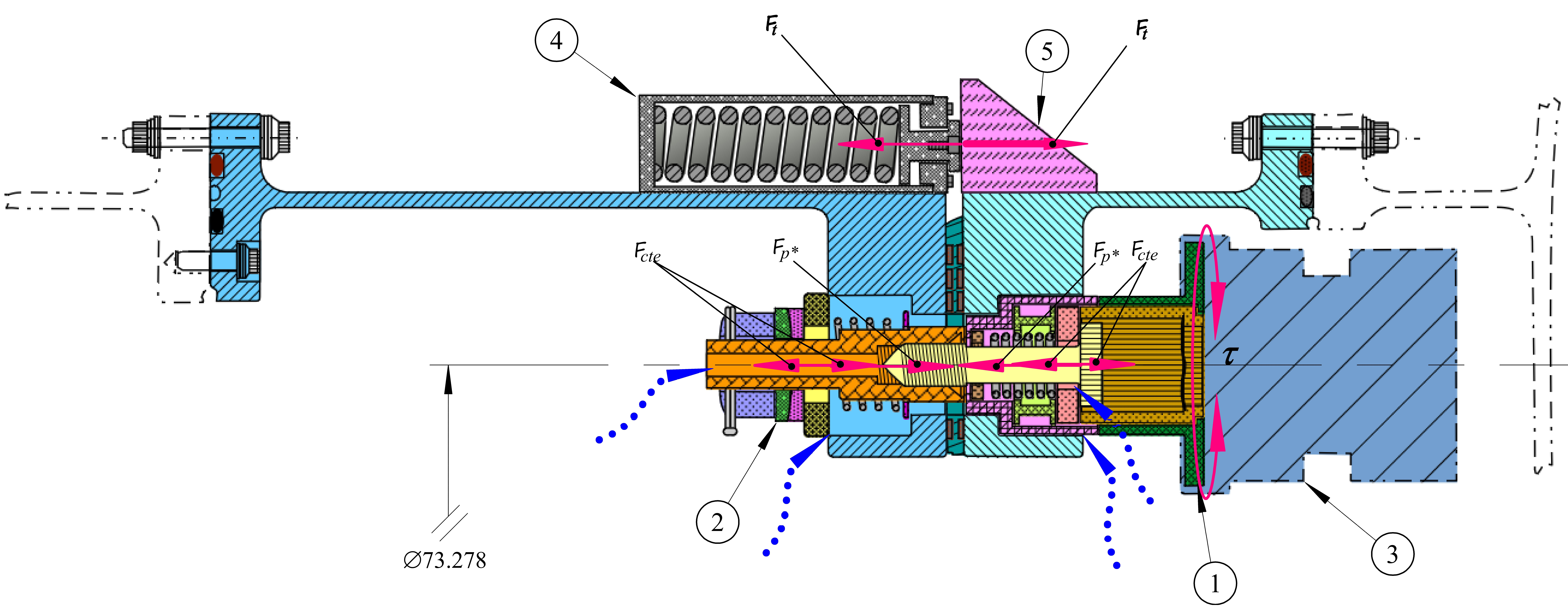
The CBM/CBM joint is clamped by 16 equally spaced Powered Bolts (1). The fine-threaded bolt shaft is machined from Inconel 718, with a nominal diameter of 0.625 in (15.9 mm). Each bolt threads into a nut encapsulated by a nutplate (2). The nut is made of Nitronic 60 steel, internally lubricated with Vitro-lube NPI-1220C. The bolt was qualified to a preload (F_{p*}) of 19,300 lbf (85,900 N), actuated by torque (τ) from an actuator (3) having a maximum sustained output of 1,600 lb⋅in (180,000 mN⋅m). The effective preload can change (F_{cte}) after berthing by the difference between coefficients of thermal expansion of bolts and flanges. Each bolt aligns with the separating load (F_{t}) of a spring-loaded thermal standoff (4), also affected by post-berth temperatures. This artist's rendering of a generic cross-section also shows (in blue) leak paths unique to the bolt locations.

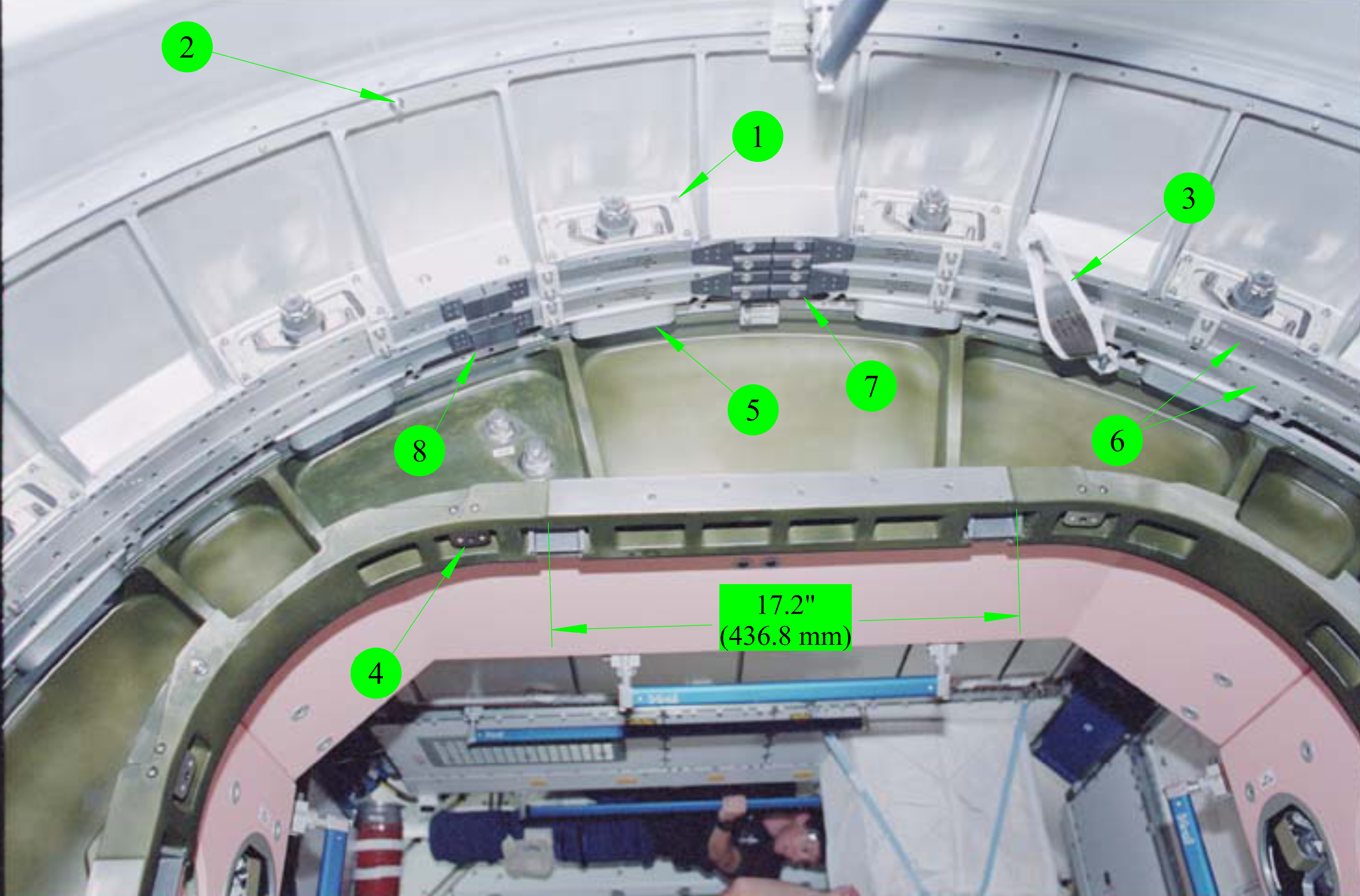
A stripped vestibule photographed during STS-092. Powered Bolt Nuts and the area reserved for their IVA seal caps are visible (1), as are a CPM/PE leak check port (2) and a CBM/CBM grounding strap (3). This is one of two Node 1 axial ports: the closeout brackets (4) are tucked into the hatch beam rather than on its face. "Butter dish" IVA seals cover the powered bolts, and covers protect the CBM/CBM IVA seal lands (6) on the inward faces of the outboard flanges. Mounts (7) and tensioners (8) for the covers are also shown.

Almost a full quadrant of mated CBM rings can be seen in the vestibule leading to PMA2, showing the thickness of the Gask-o-seal (1) between them. The rings are rigidly joined by 16 nuts (2), each having been threaded into by a Powered Bolt to carry axial and bending loads between mated modules. Of the bolt, only the actuator (3) is visible. Also seen are a capture latch (4), a capture fitting (5), some electrical/control harnessing, and a quadrant's complement of mated alignment guides.

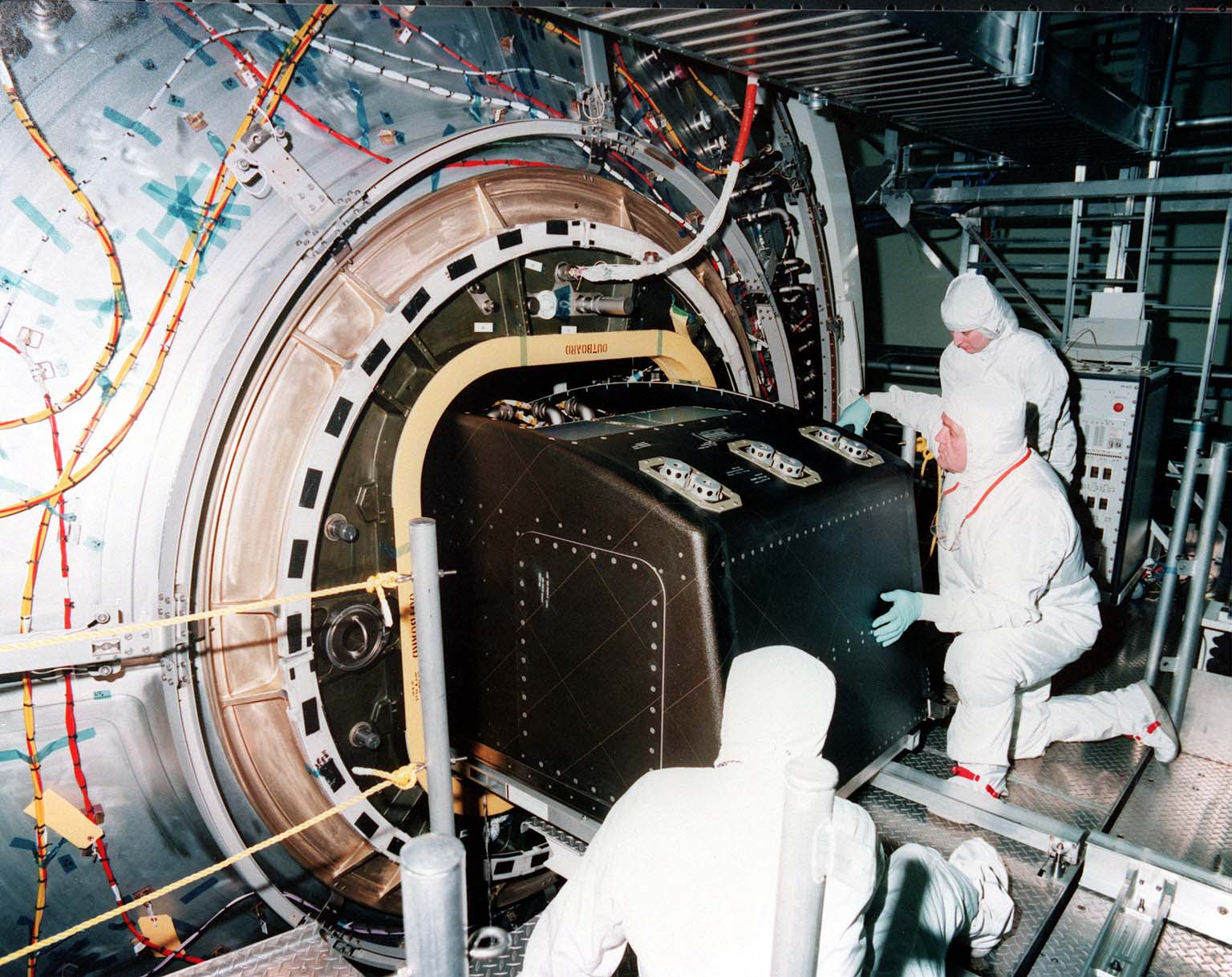
Insertion of the first system rack into the US Lab "Destiny" demonstrated the sizing logic for both the common hatch and the CBM, that followed from the architectural approach described in Hopson, Aaron & Grant (1990). The ACBM ring had not yet been installed when this photo was taken in March, 1998.

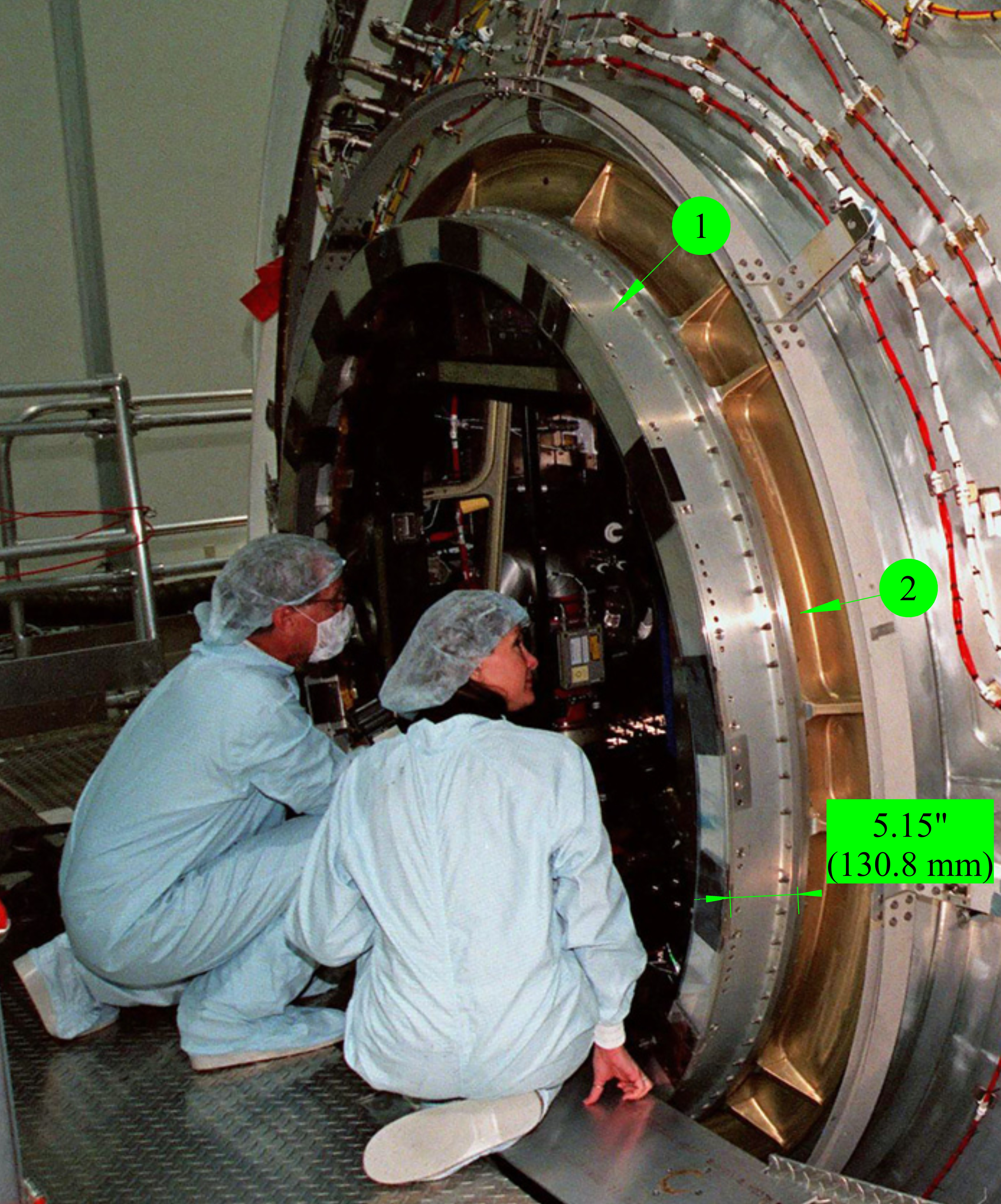
The ACBM structural ring (1) bolts to the bulkhead flange (2). The 96-bolt outside pattern is identical to that of the PCBM ring. Exterior insulation and shields had not yet been installed when this photo of the US "Destiny" Lab was taken in November, 1998.

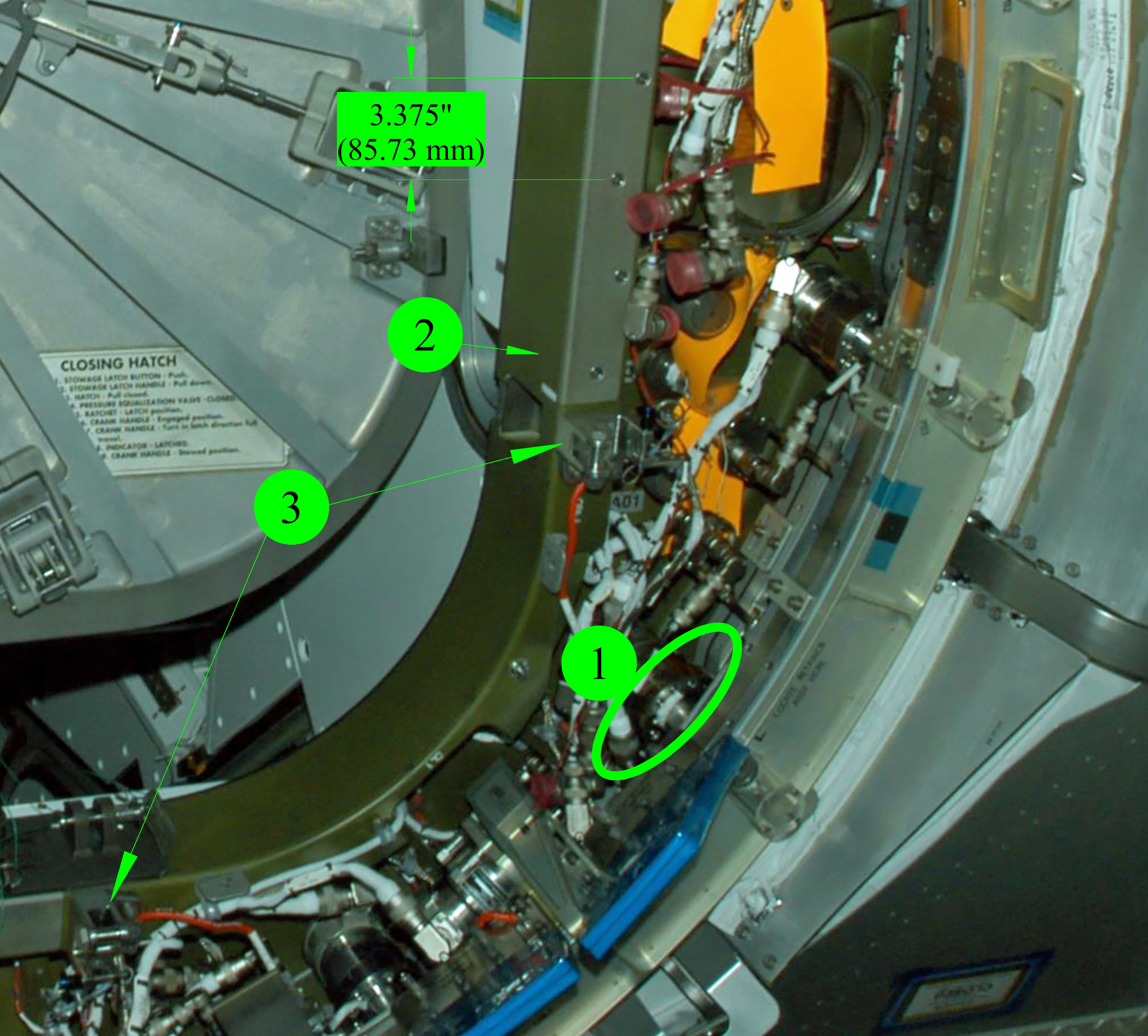
The ID of the inboard flange is "scalloped" in 16 places to fit Powered Bolt Actuators, as highlighted (1) on Node 2 during assembly in 2004. The ID pattern has 112 bolts, for a total of 208 fasteners at that joint. The hatch beam (2) shows mounting holes for a controller panel assembly (CPA), and M/D Center Section standoff brackets (3) are installed. The flange cover will be removed before flight.

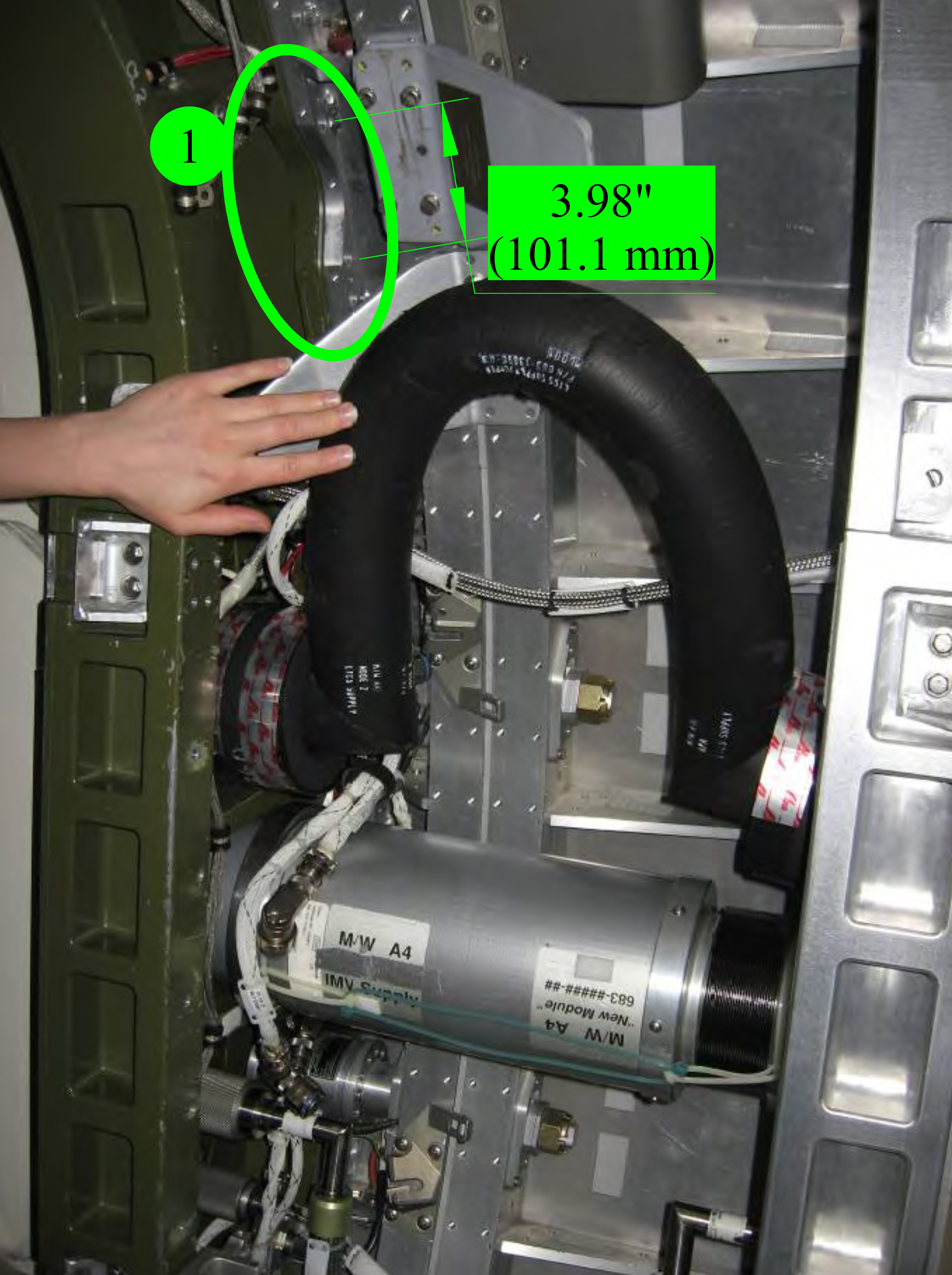
The ACBM's ID scallop (1) is better visible in this training mockup, where an actuator is removed. Both sides of the joint are shaped to accommodate the IVA seal in a contingency.

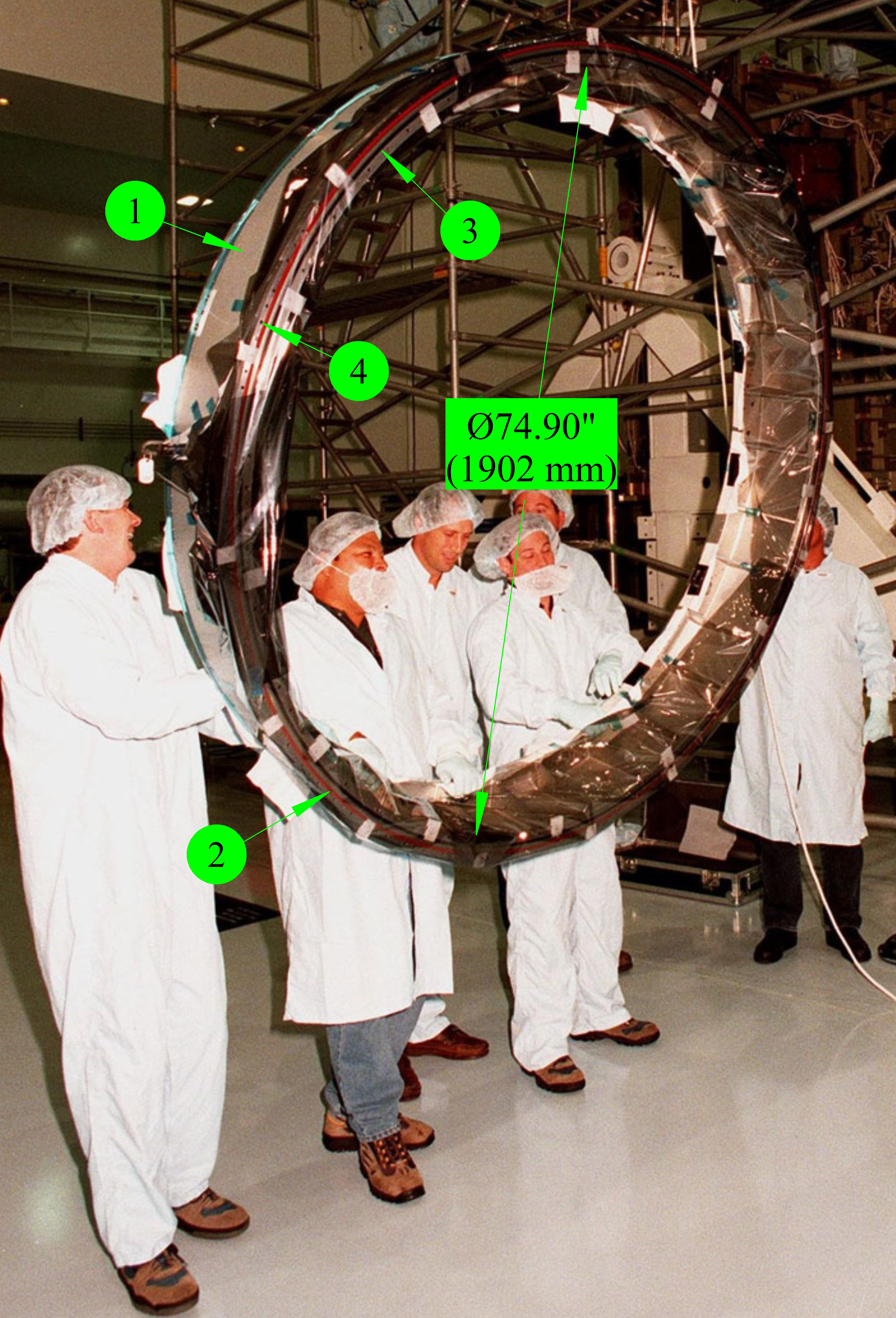
The Z1 PCBM ring (1) before installation in 1998. Viewed here from the PE side, the silicone (2) and fluorocarbon (3) O-rings are already installed under the inboard flange. The attachment bolt holes (4) are visible around the inboard flange, and indexing pins protrude to ensure that the seals compress uniformly as it is bolted into place.

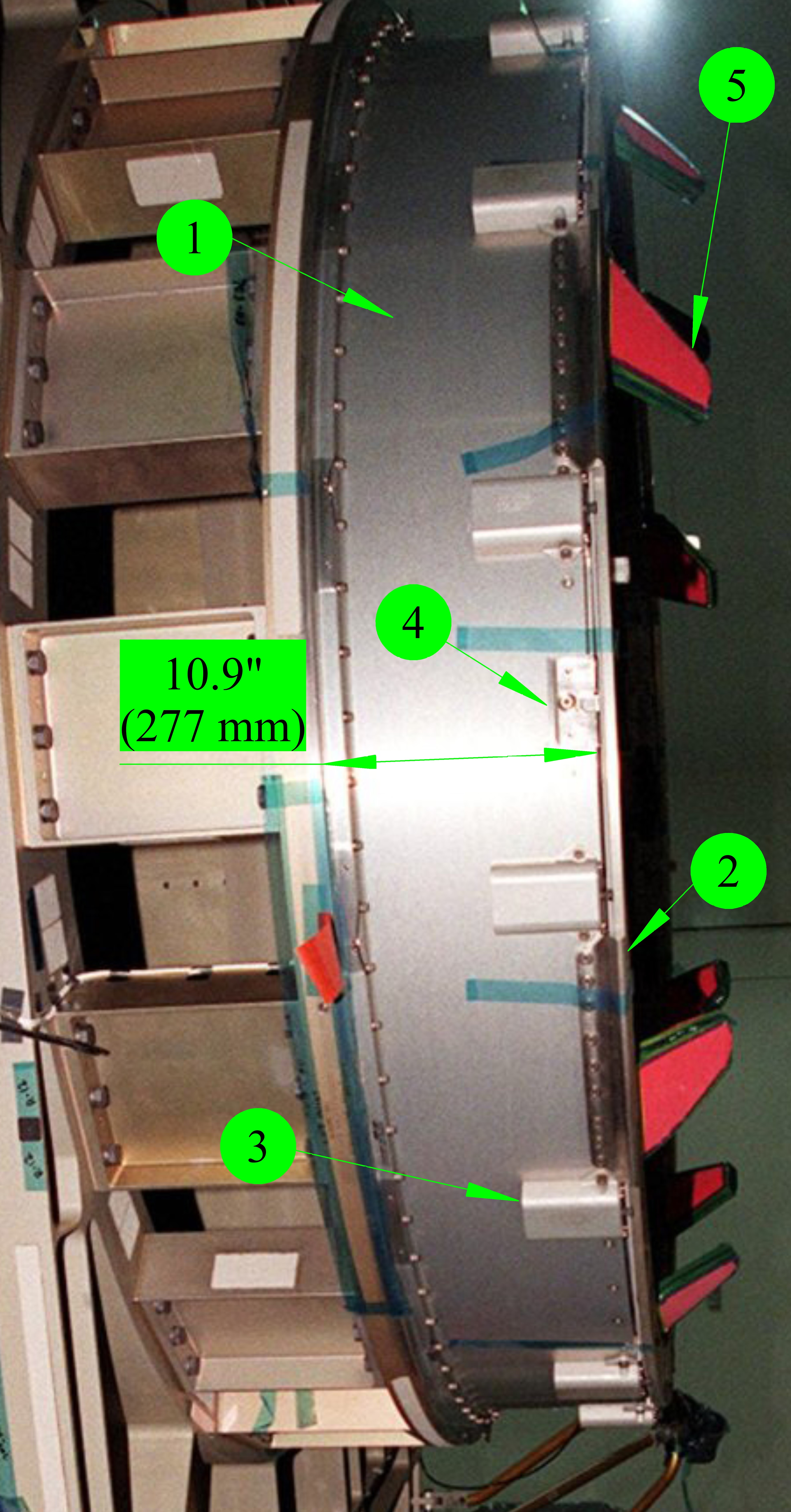
Seen here in early 2000, the Z1 PCBM ring (1) is attached to the dome by 96 1/4-inch bolts inside and outside. Bumpers (2), Thermal Stand-offs (3), Alignment Sockets (4), and Alignment Guides (5) are also installed.

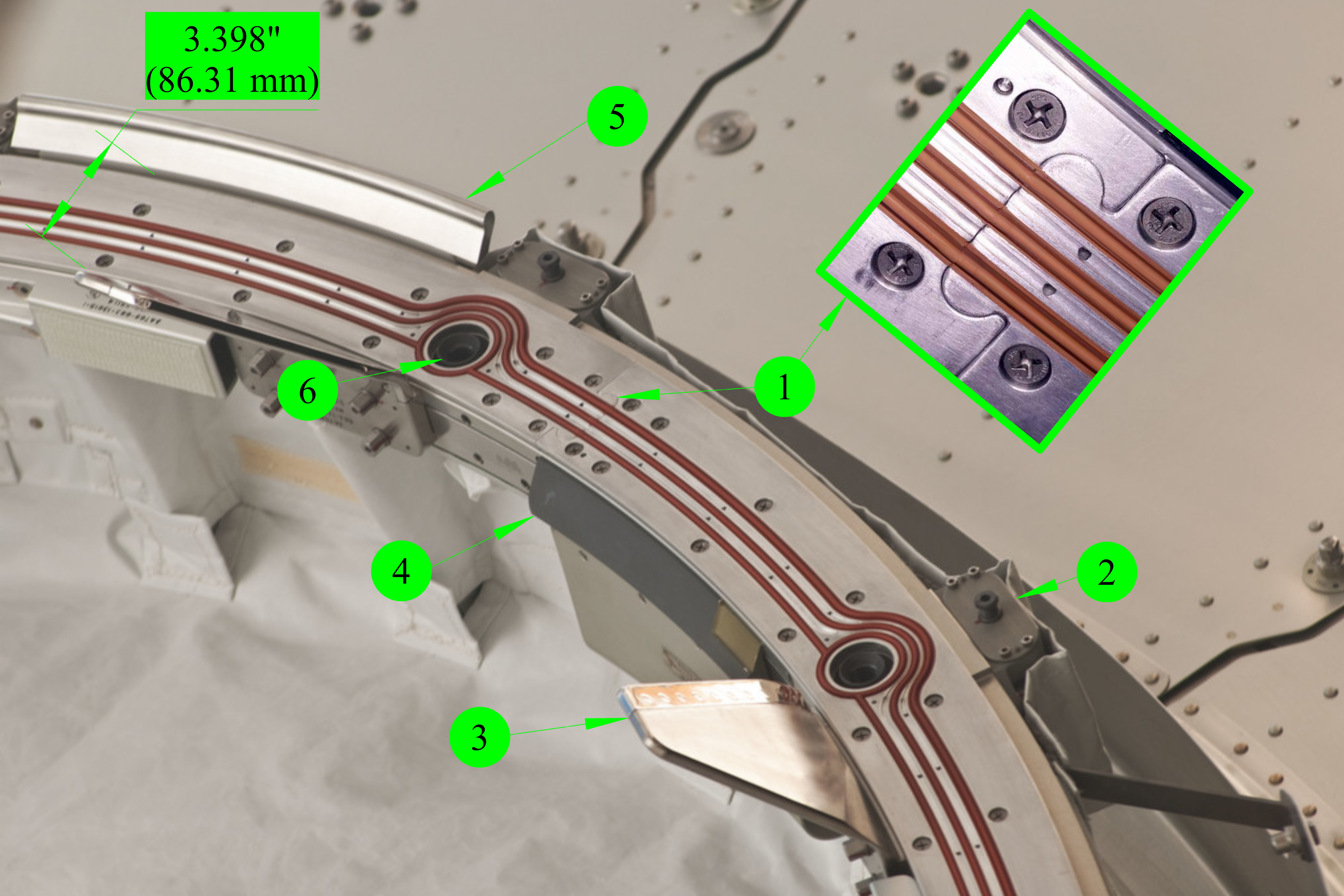
The seal between the two CBM sides is a four-segment, two-sided molded design. Attached to the PCBM ring by 36 bolts, each segment's aluminum substrate is 0.250 in (6.4 mm) thick. Three beads are molded into each segment, ranging in height from 0.044 in (1.1 mm) (inner bead) to 0.050 in (1.3 mm) (outer). A little more than 1/8th of the circumference is shown here during STS-124; the segment "interlock" joint (1) is highlighted in the inset. The photo also shows the ends of two thermal standoffs (2), alignment guides (3), a capture fitting (4), a bumper (5) and the ends of two Powered Bolt Nuts (6). Small holes and sunken channels between the seal beads permit leak testing of the CBM/CBM joint once mated.

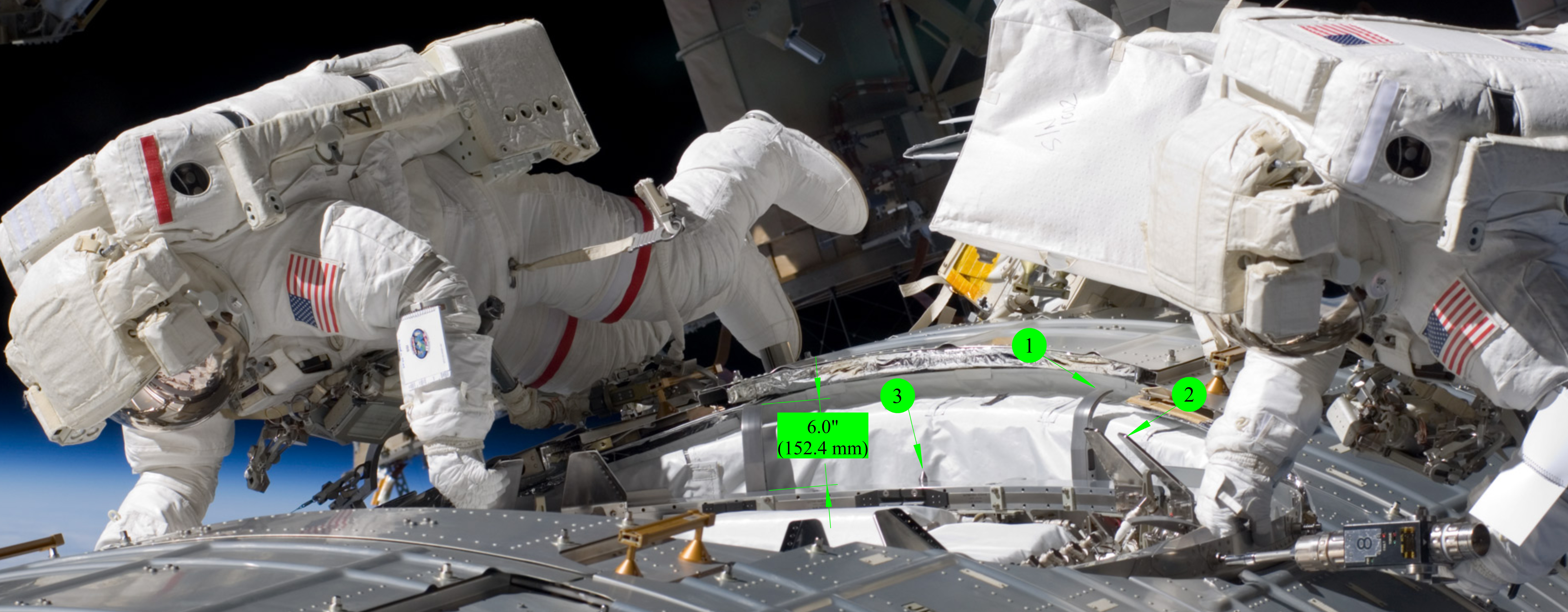
Three stages of alignment are seen in this photo of Kibo's ACBM from STS-124. Bumpers (1), curving over the "high wall", are on radial ports only. All ACBM installations have Alignment Guides (2), and Alignment Pins (3). The constraint is handed off from each stage to its successor while the in-coming module is moved with the RMS. Final alignment happens when the pins seat in their respective PCBM sockets during capture. They carry shear and torsion loads across the interface thereafter.

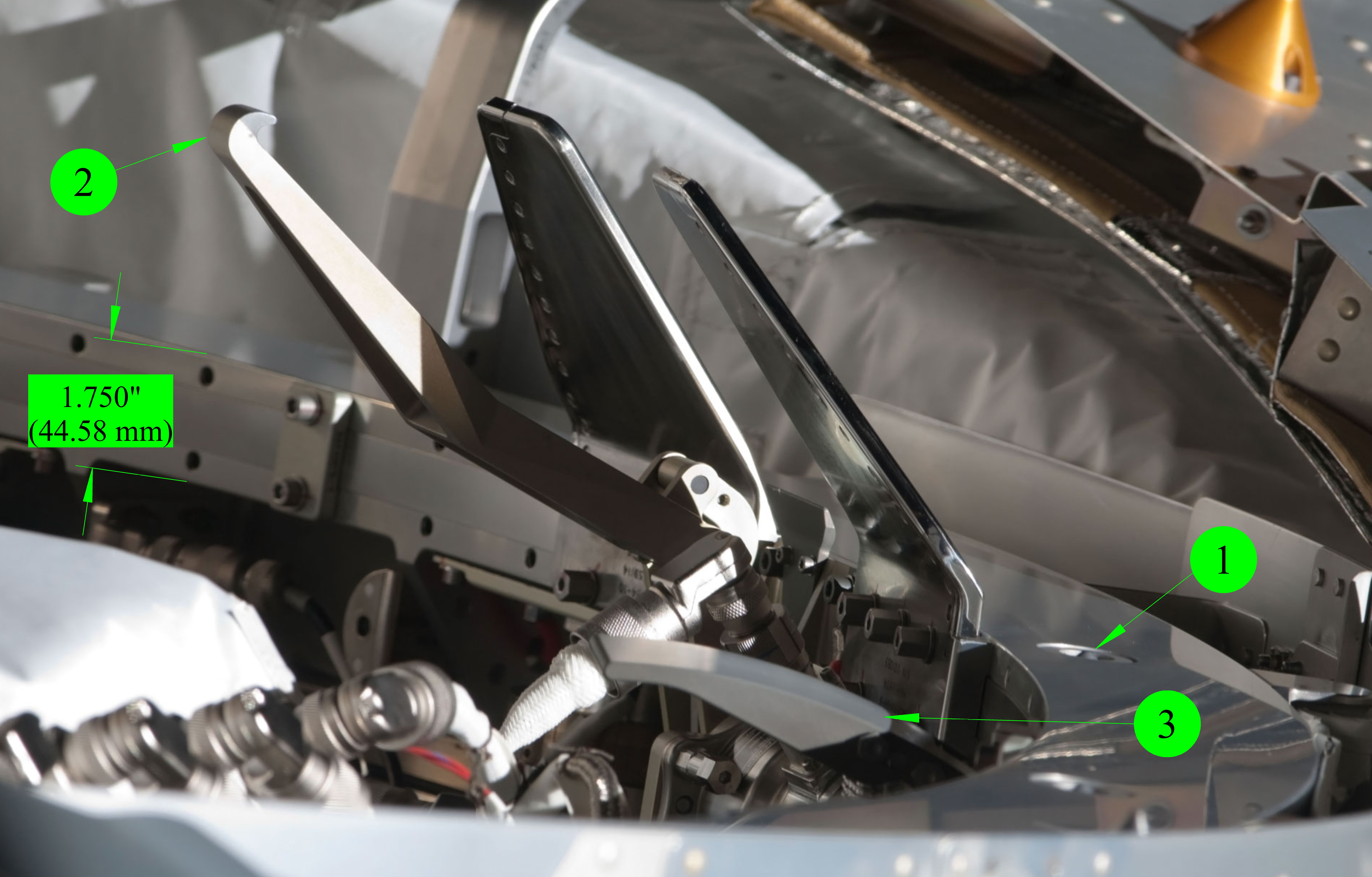
The tip of a Powered Bolt (1) peeks out from the outboard flange on Kibo's radial port during STS-124. The Capture Latch (2) is at or near "capture ready". Its tip stands over 5” above the flange here, but reaches further during its sweep. A Ready-to-Latch Indicator (3) will be depressed by the PCBM's Alignment Guide during the RMS maneuver.

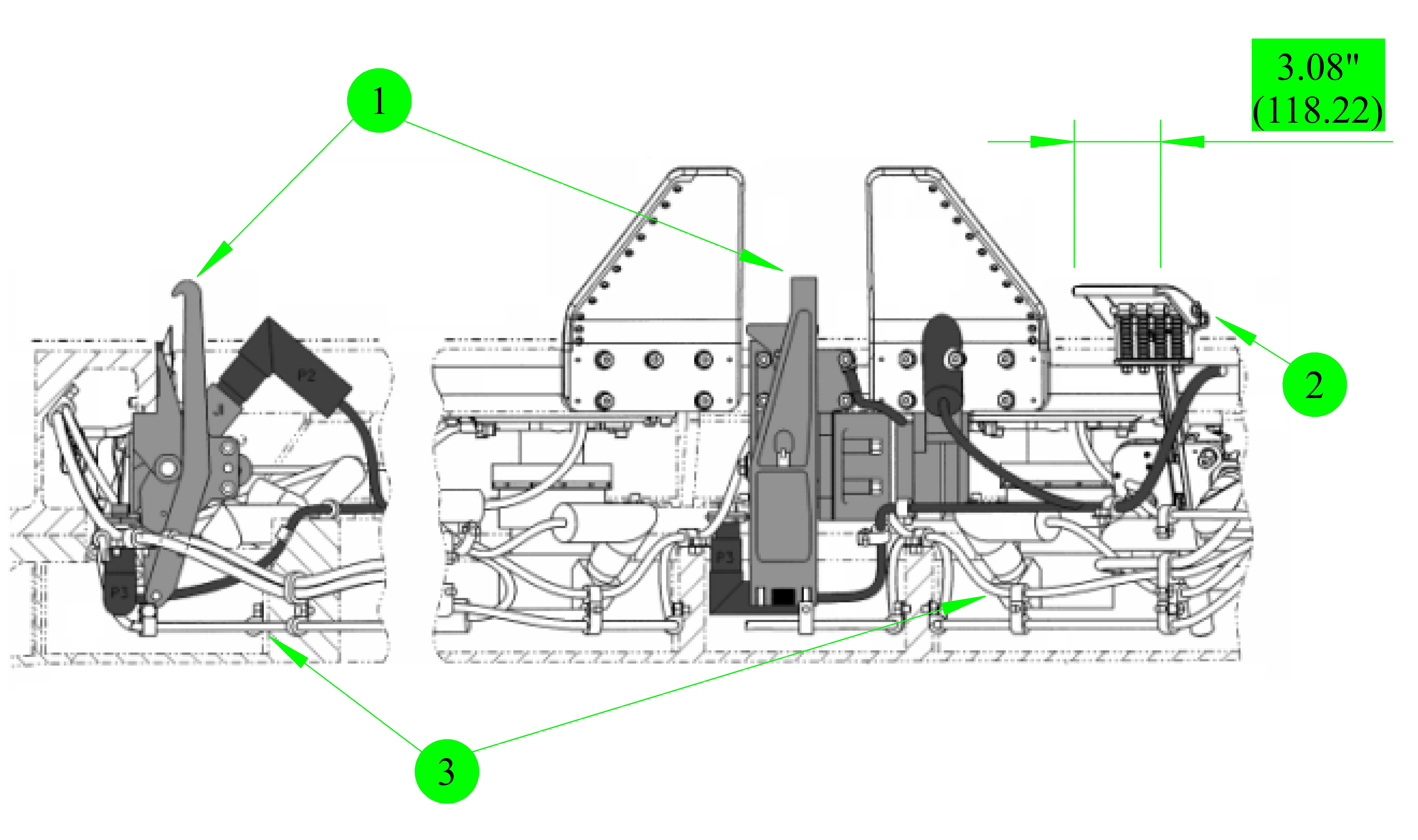
Front and side elevation diagrams of the Capture Latch (1) in the closed position. The underside of the Ready-to-Latch Indicator (2) shows one set of springs that will be compressed by the PCBM Alignment Guide during capture. The cables (3) are for the latch and its limit switch, the RTL, and nearby Powered Bolts.

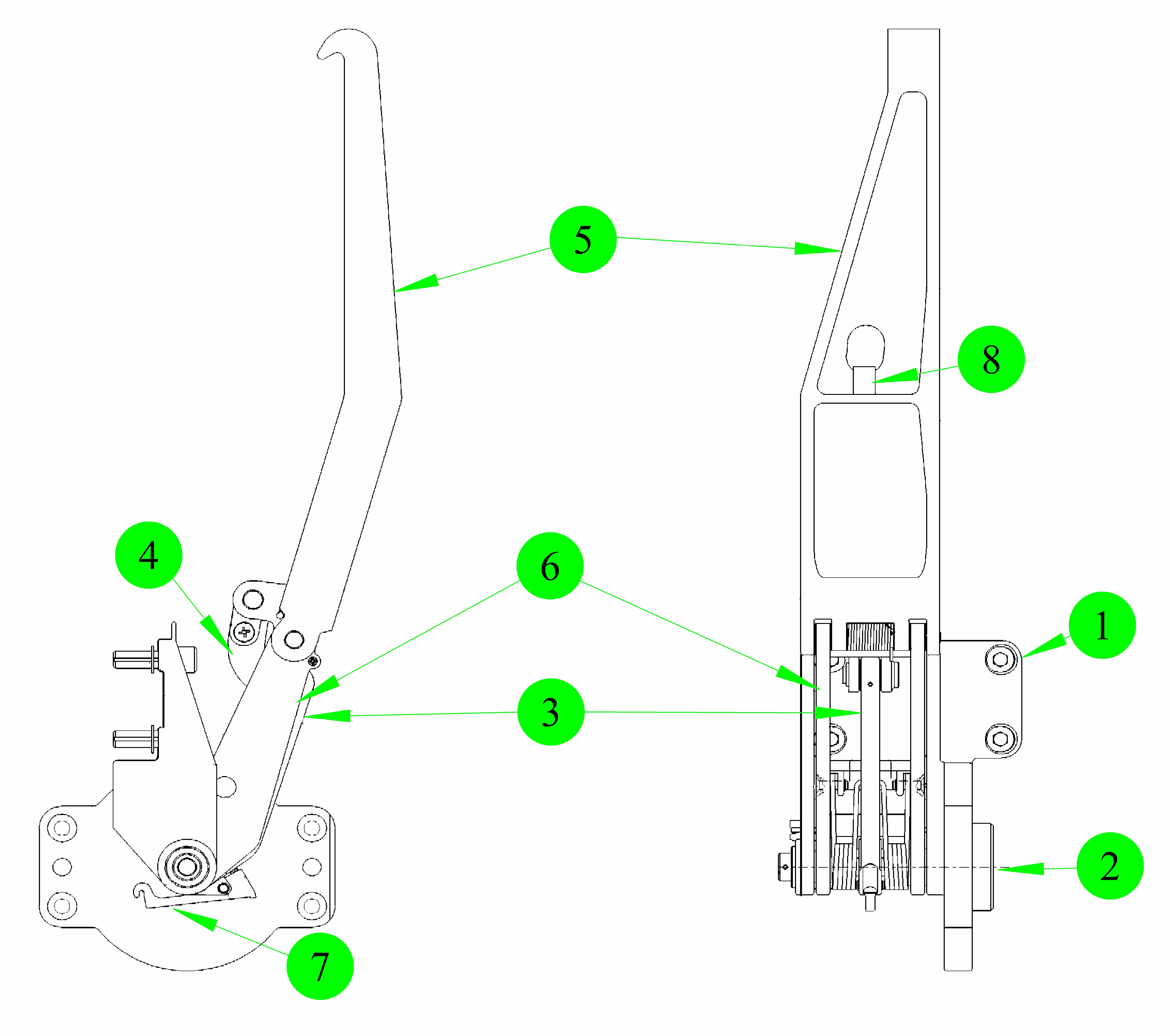
The Capture Latch is a rotating four-bar linkage. Attached to the chassis (1), an actuator (not shown) applies torque to the drive axle (2), rotating the drive arm (3). The arm pushes the "dogleg assembly" (4) around, which torques the outer clevis of the Capture Arm (5). The Capture Arm rotates about the end of the Follower linkage (6), the other end of which rotates about the axle. When deployed, the latch trips a switch (not shown). When fully closed it is locked by a hook (7) passing through the hole (8) in the Capture Arm.

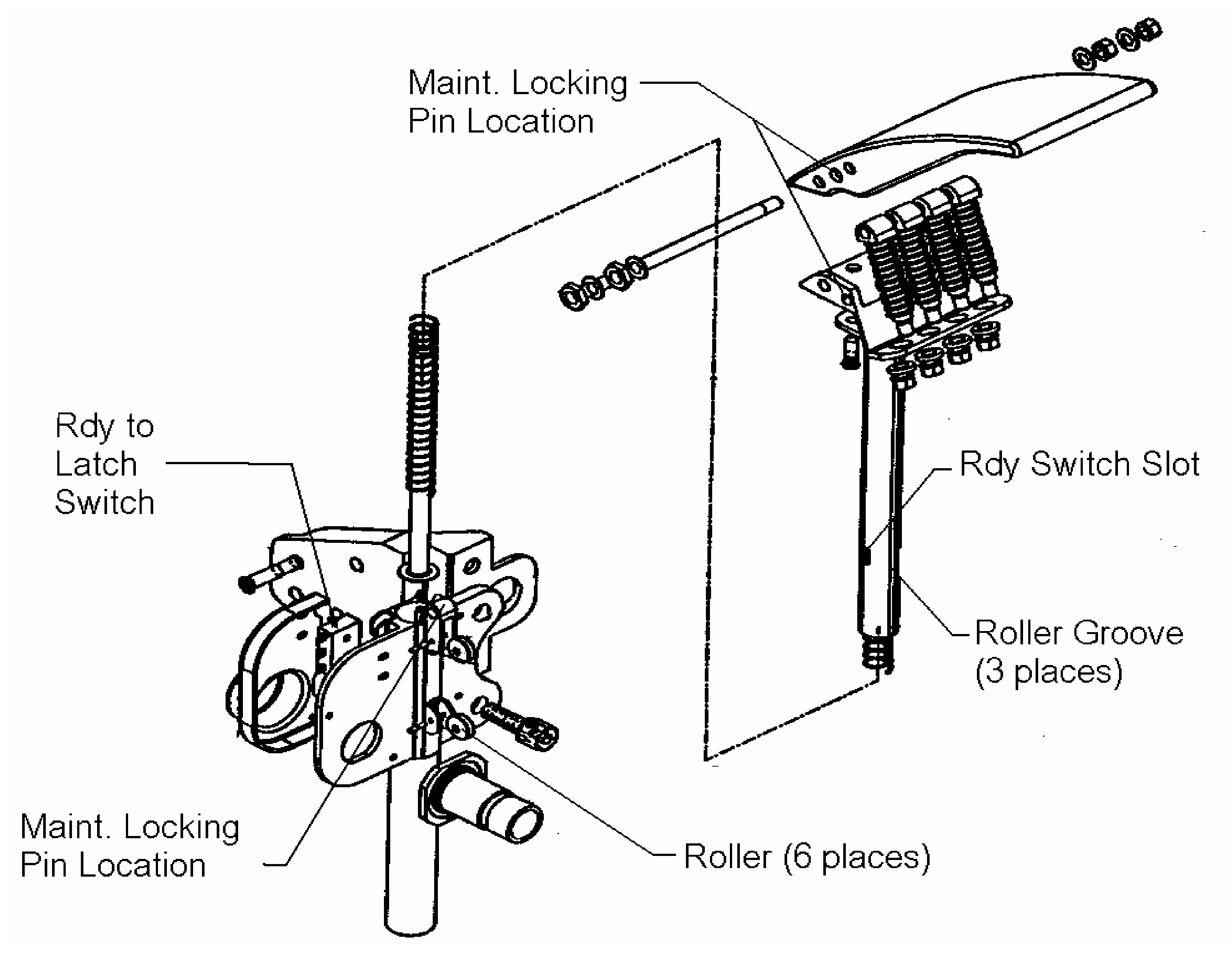
The ACBM's Ready-to-Latch (RTL) indicator is a spring-loaded device, depressing in combined rotation and plunge by the PCBM Alignment Guide. It transmits a signal to the RMS Operator through the ACBM Controller Panel Assembly. Each of the two spring-loaded degrees of freedom can be locked out for maintenance. One RTL is associated with each Capture Latch.

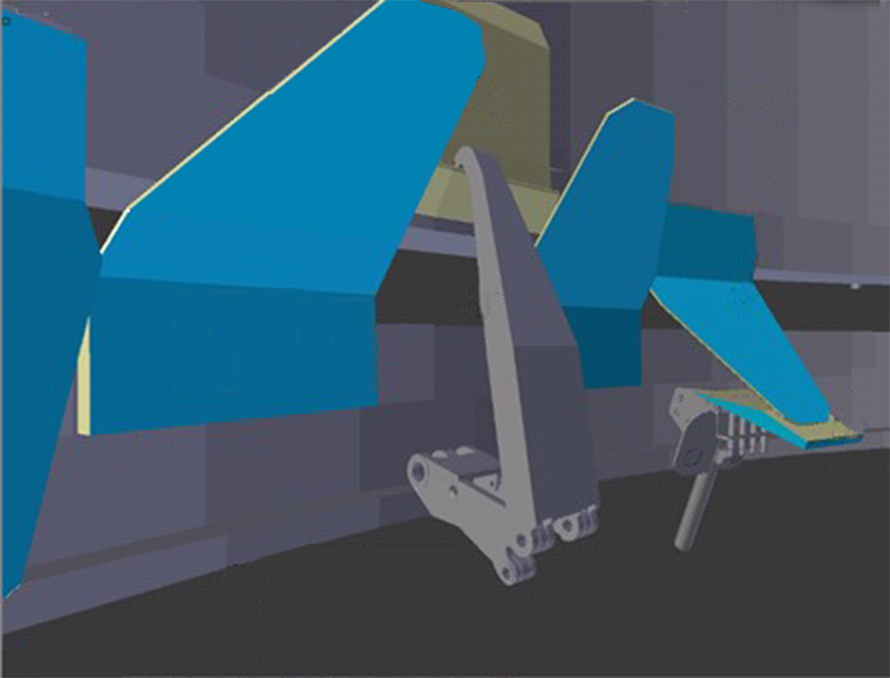
The internally located capture components are shown here at an intermediate capture position. The Ready-to-Latch indicator has already been plunged, but has not yet been rotated under the PCBM Alignment Guide. This frame was taken from a real-time contact dynamics simulation created at JSC.

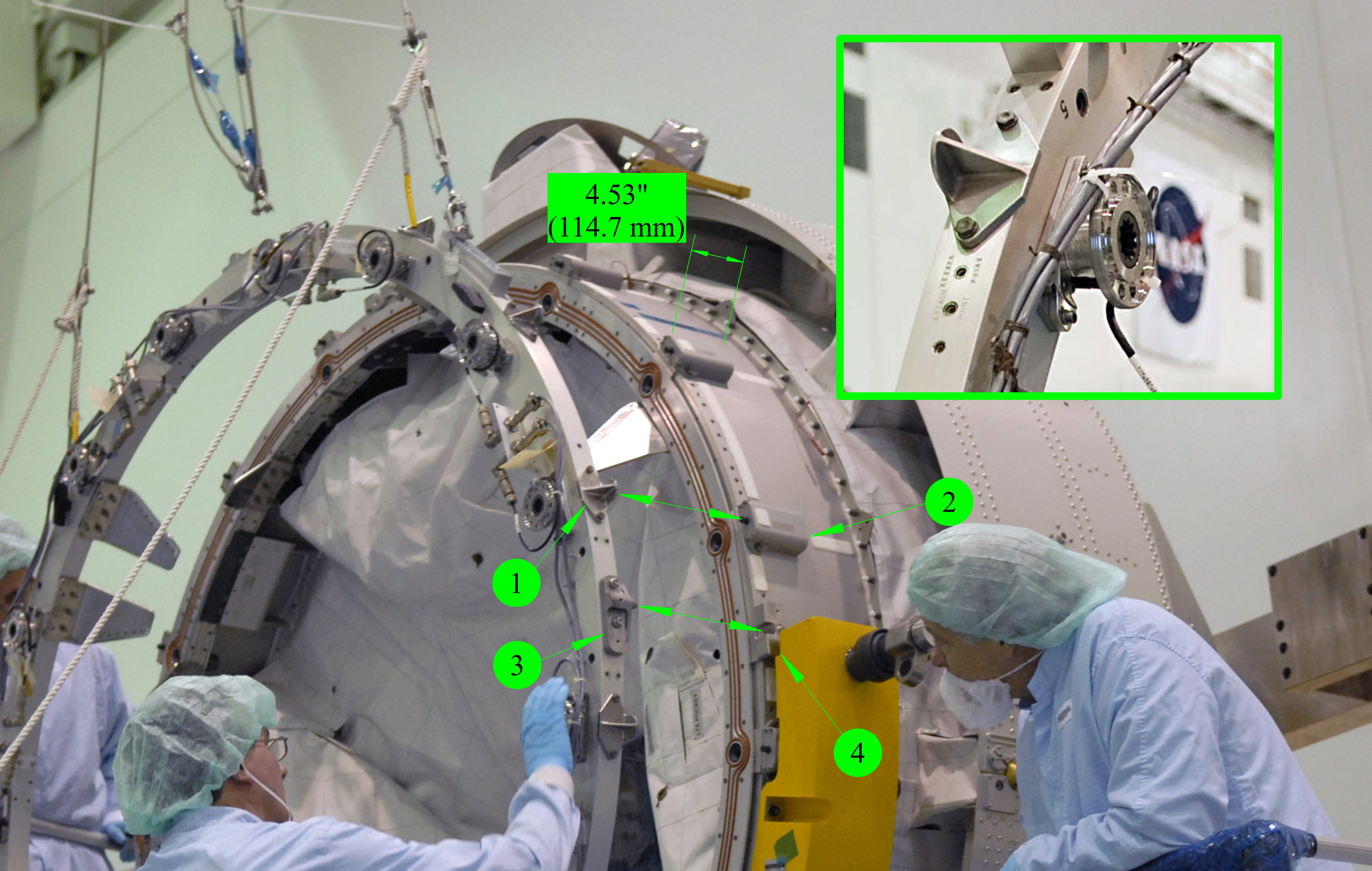
Powered Bolt upper housings are shown in this pre-flight test of the Cupola from late 2008. Actuators are not used in this equipment. Engagement of strikeplates (1) with thermal standoffs (2) and alignment pins (3) with sockets (4) is imminent. The inset, from a photo taken two years later, shows the back of the Powered Bolt Assembly's Upper Housing.

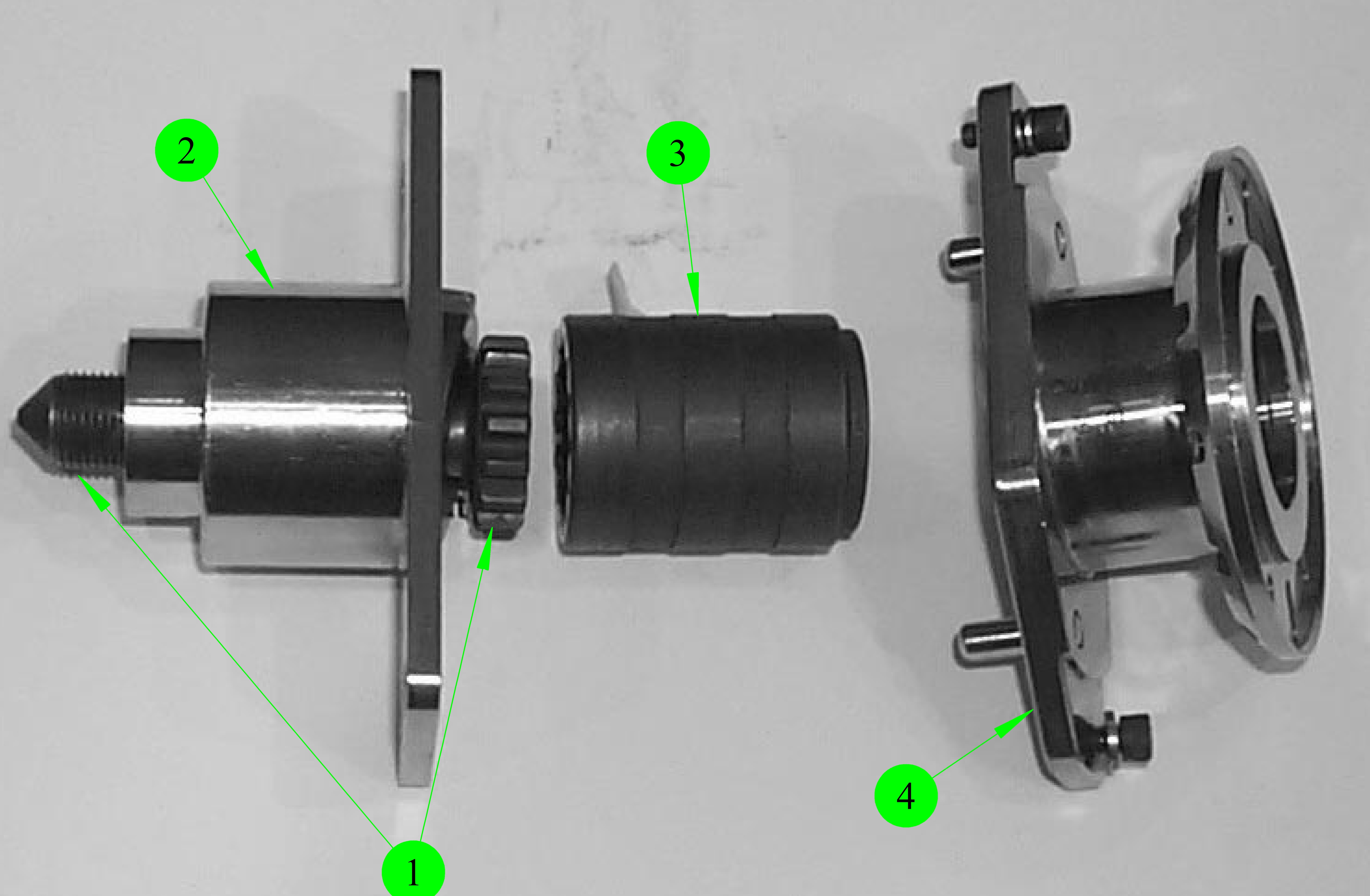
A partially disassembled CBM Powered Bolt, showing both ends of the shaft (1), the lower housing (2) that nestles into the ACBM ring, the drive sleeve (3) and its spline interface with the shaft, and the upper housing (4). The upper housing and drive sleeve can be removed without demating the vestibule to install a spline lock under an IVA seal "butter dish". The spline lock prevents the bolt from backing out.

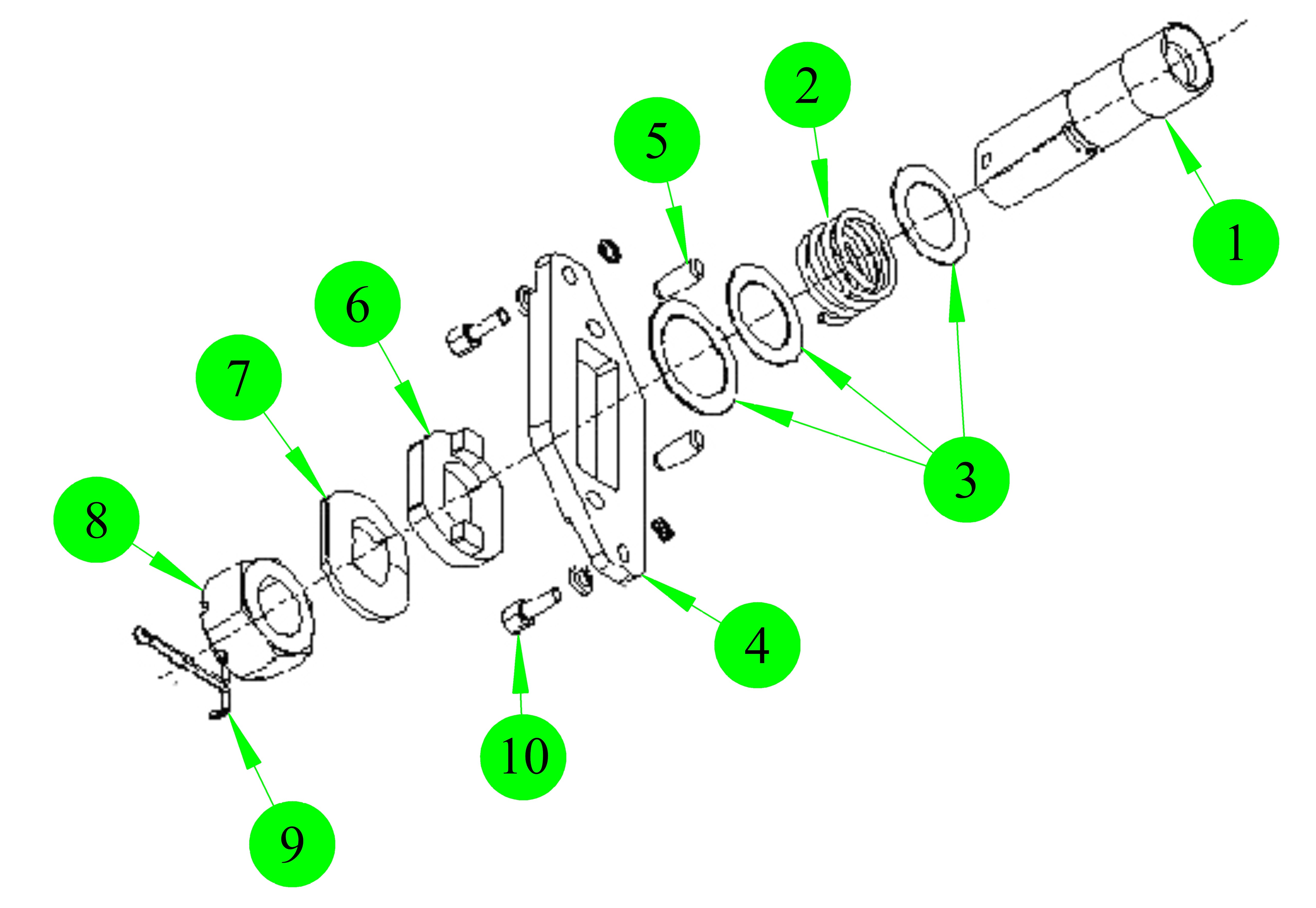
Each Powered Bolt "acquires" an Encapsulated Nut (1) to align the threads. It is loaded by a spring (2) retained between washers (3) under a nut plate (4). The plate is located on the back of the PCBM's outboard flange by a pair of dowel pins (5). As the bolt nudges the nut during acquisition, motion of the nut is constrained by tabs on the Floating Washer (6) inside the plate's rectangular hole and by a Spherical Washer (7). A Castellated Nut (8), locked with a Cotter Pin (9), holds the stack together. It attaches to the flange by a pair of Captive Fasteners (10). If the Powered Bolt jams in the Encapsulated Nut, disassembly permits the seized units to be removed and replaced from the ACBM side without depressurizing the vestibule.

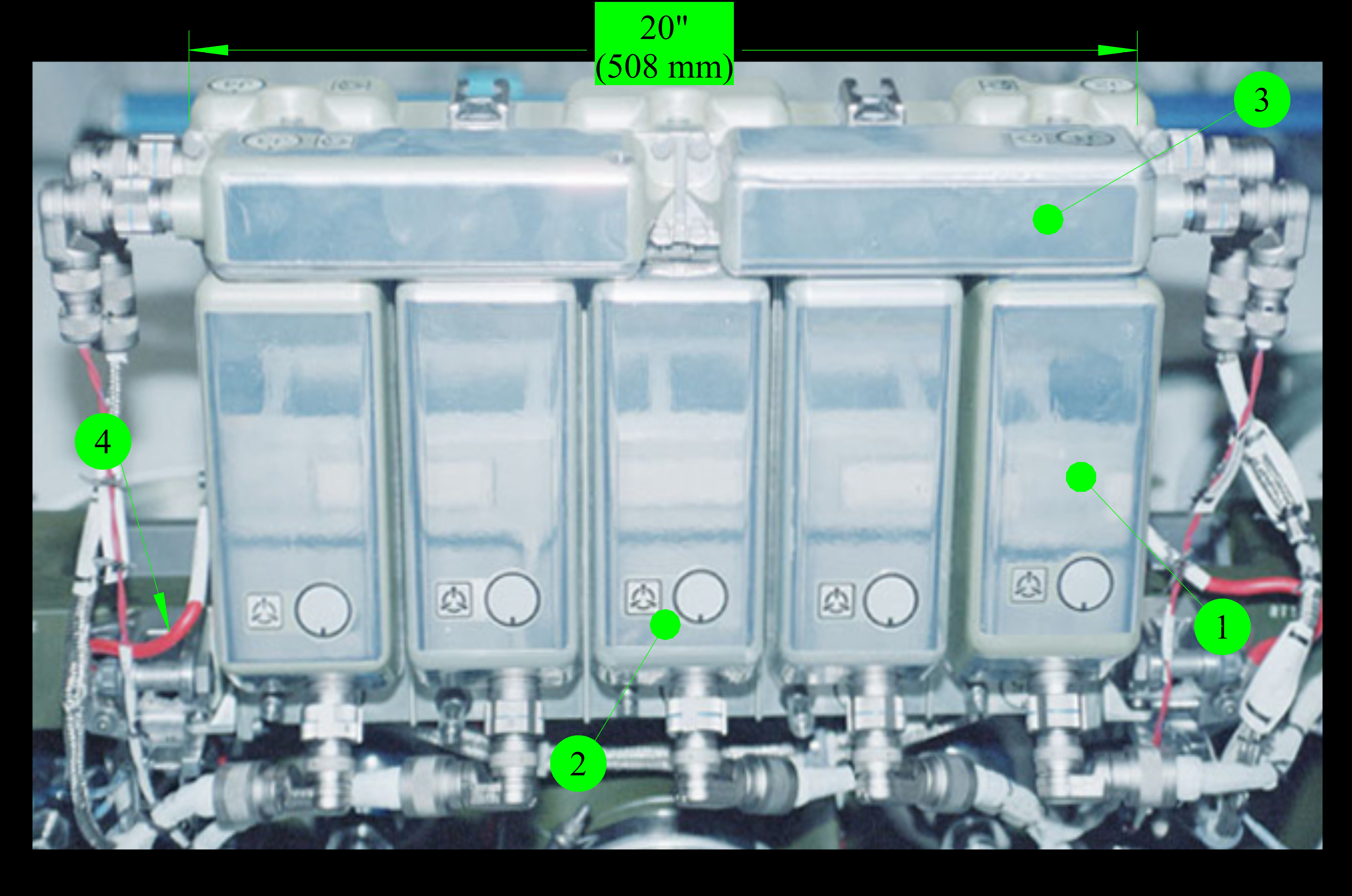
One of the four Controller Panel Assemblies (CPA) bolted to a hatch beam during STS-102 in 2001. Each CPA has one Capture Latch controller (1), four Powered Bolt controllers (2) and circuitry to condition input power (3). A bracket (4) for installation of the M/D "center section" cover is visible on either side of the CPA. The photograph was taken from the PCBM side of the mated vestibule, looking back into the ACBM. The basic individual controller design is also used for the Carbon Dioxide Removal Assembly's Pump Fan Motor Controller, Vent and Relief Valve, and Internal Thermal Control System valves.

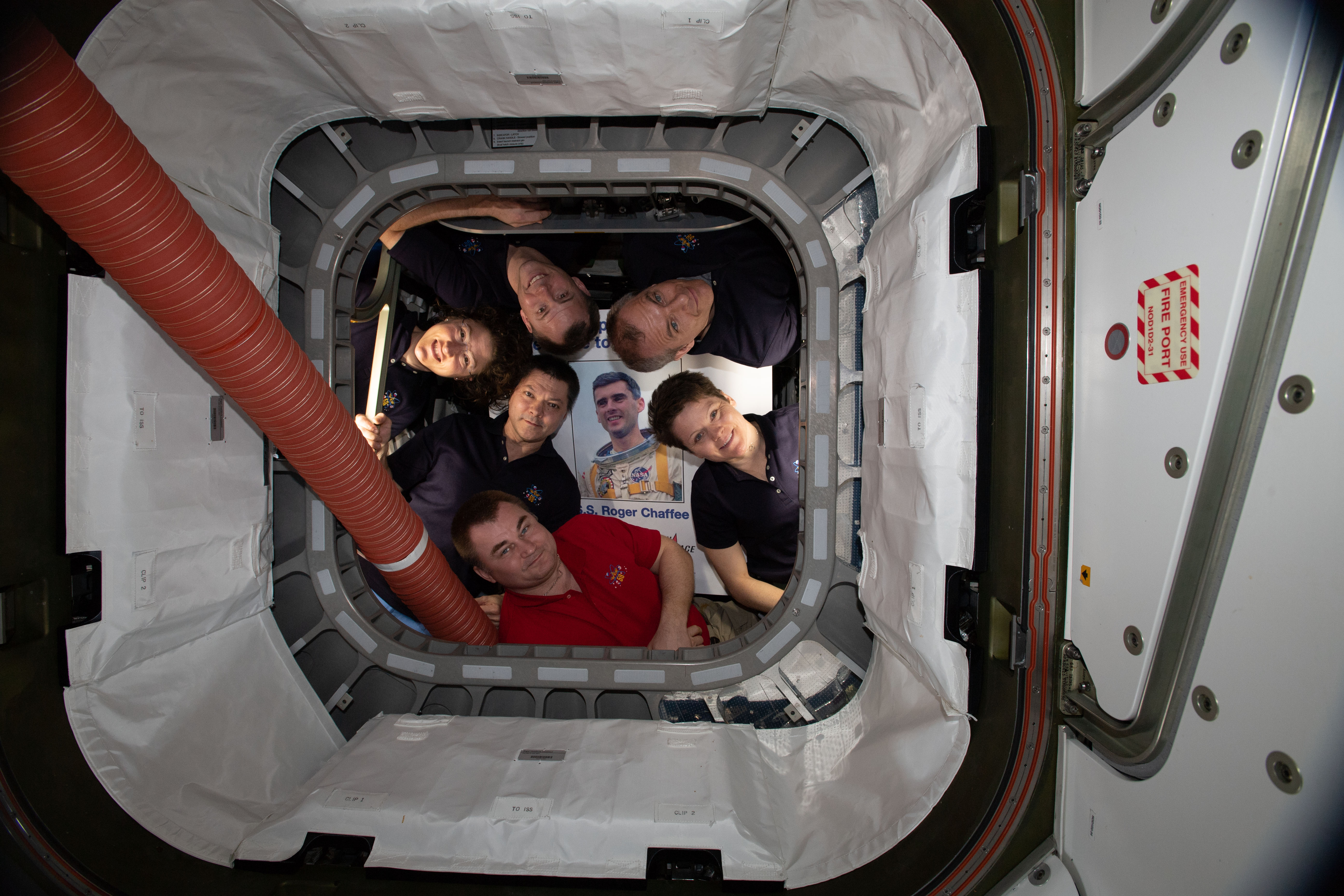
The six-member Expedition 59 crew poses for a portrait looking through the vestibule between Node 1 (Unity) and Northrop Grumman's Cygnus commercial space freighter. The closeout covers a full complement of rotated CPAs.

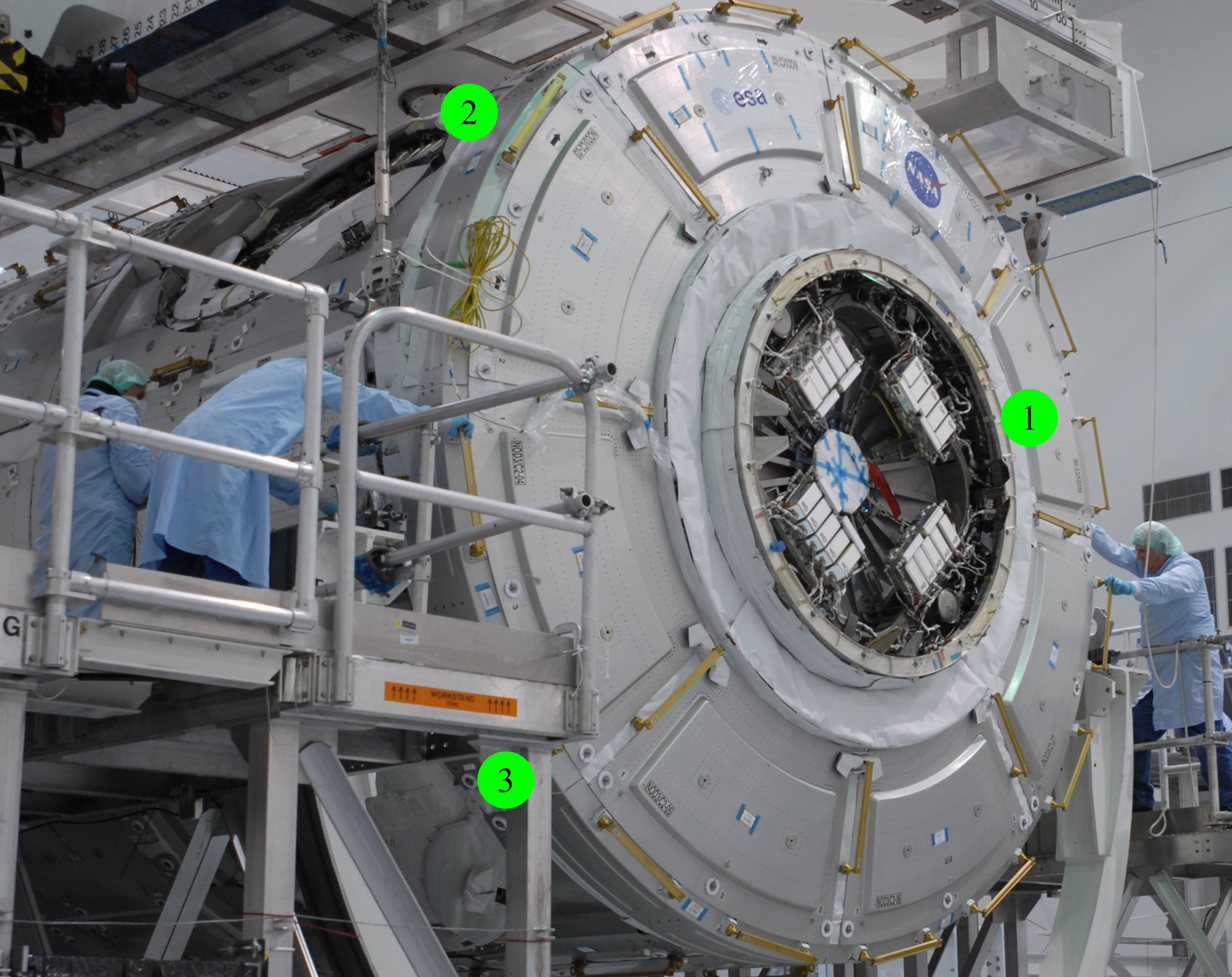
Each Active CBM has four Controller Panel Assemblies. With five ACBM's, Node 3 carried 20 such units to orbit. As seen here on an axial ACBM (1) CPA's are cantilevered across the hatch. In this photo taken at KSC in 2009, the proximity of M/D petals to the CPA is also visible on a radial port (2). Another port (3) has already been equipped with the M/D Center Section.

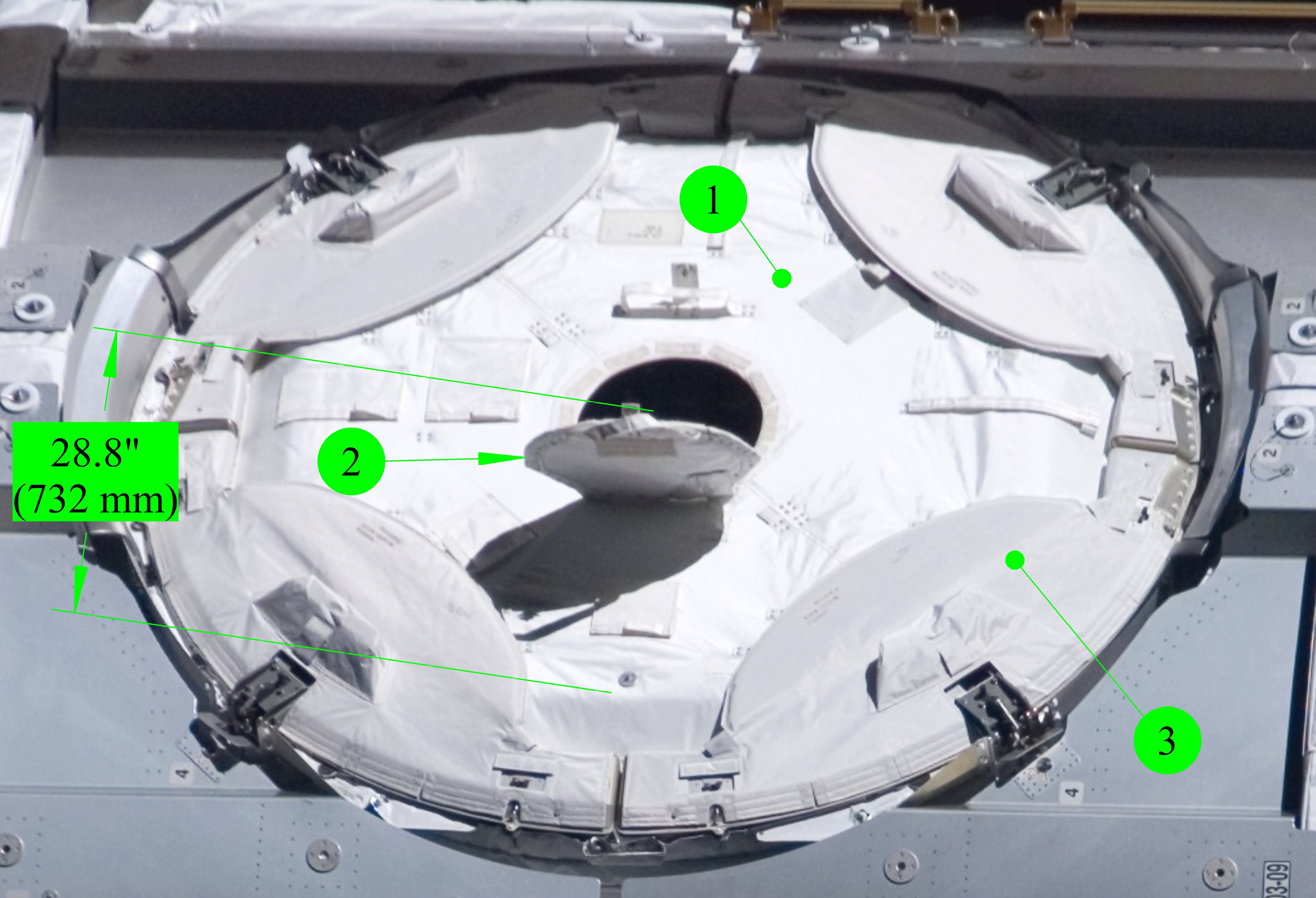
The large M/D Center Section (1) covers most of the hatch to protect it from the meteoroid/debris environment. It has several straps and openings, depending on installed location. Most covers have a flap (2) over the hatch window, as seen here during STS-120. The flap is restrained by "hook and loop" closure, held with a snap. Each of the four Capture Latches is covered by a spring-loaded deployable petal (3). They open to expose the mechanisms that effect the on-orbit mate.

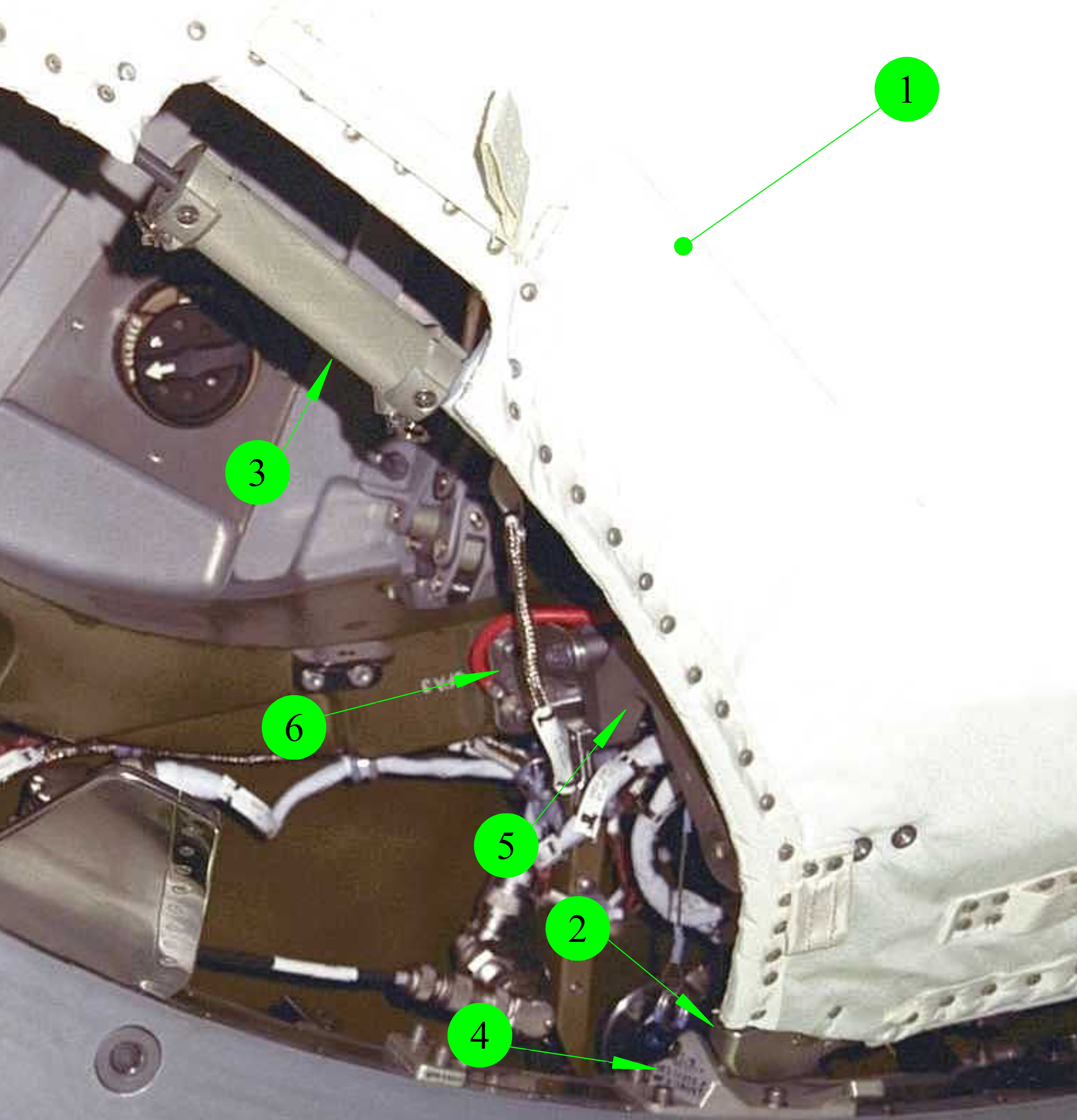
The Center Section's multi-layer fabric (1) is suspended by a cable running through pulleys (2) around its perimeter, tensioned by turnbuckles (3). Inserted into ring-mounted clevises (4), the pulleys pull against standoffs (5) that fit into brackets (6) on either side of each CPA. The center section is removed from underneath by the crew to expose the newly berthed module.

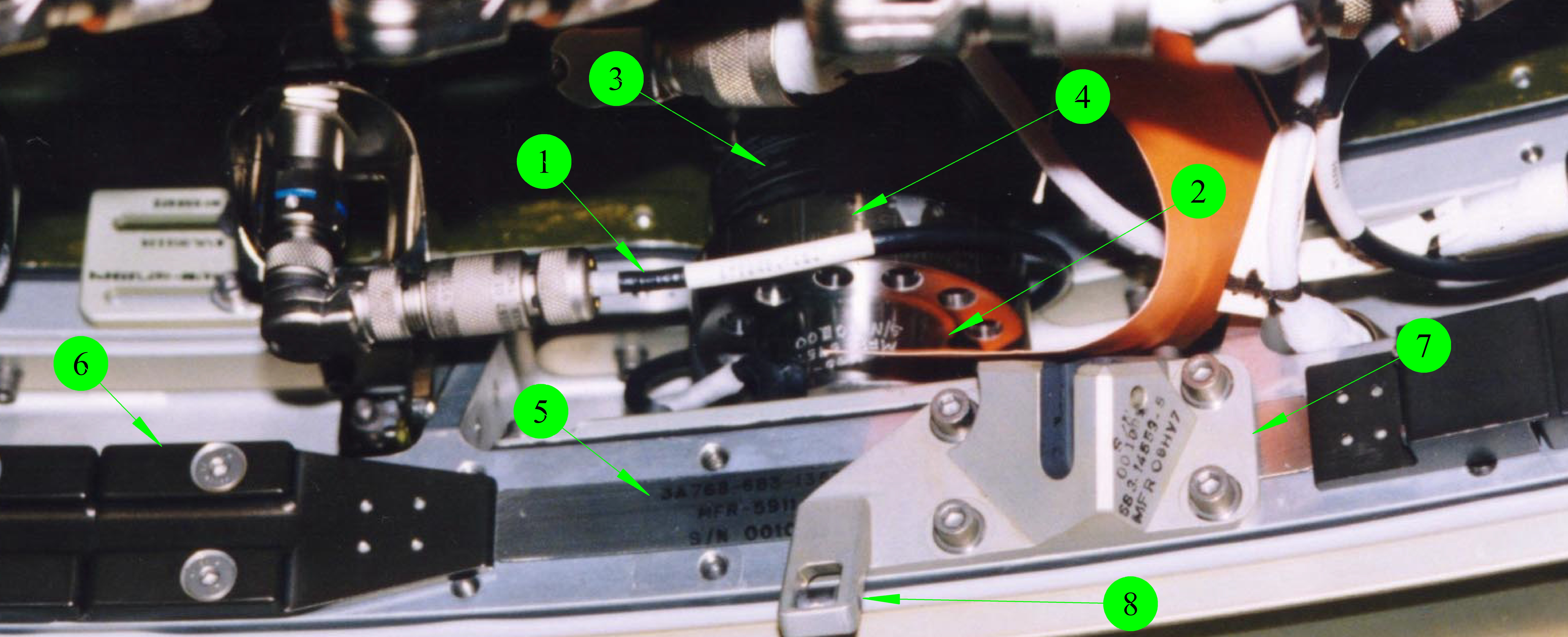
The tightly packed area near one corner of a Radial Port hatch is seen here in a figure from an in-flight maintenance manual. The cable (1) of a Powered Bolt load cell wraps around the upper housing (2) and actuator (3), which are held together by a threaded collar (4). The protective cover (5) and cover mount (6) for the CBM/CBM IVA seal are in the foreground, as is one of the eight clevises (7) for the M/D Cover Center Section. The restraint slot (8) for a Deployable Cover launch lock pin protrudes beyond the CBM/CBM interface plane.

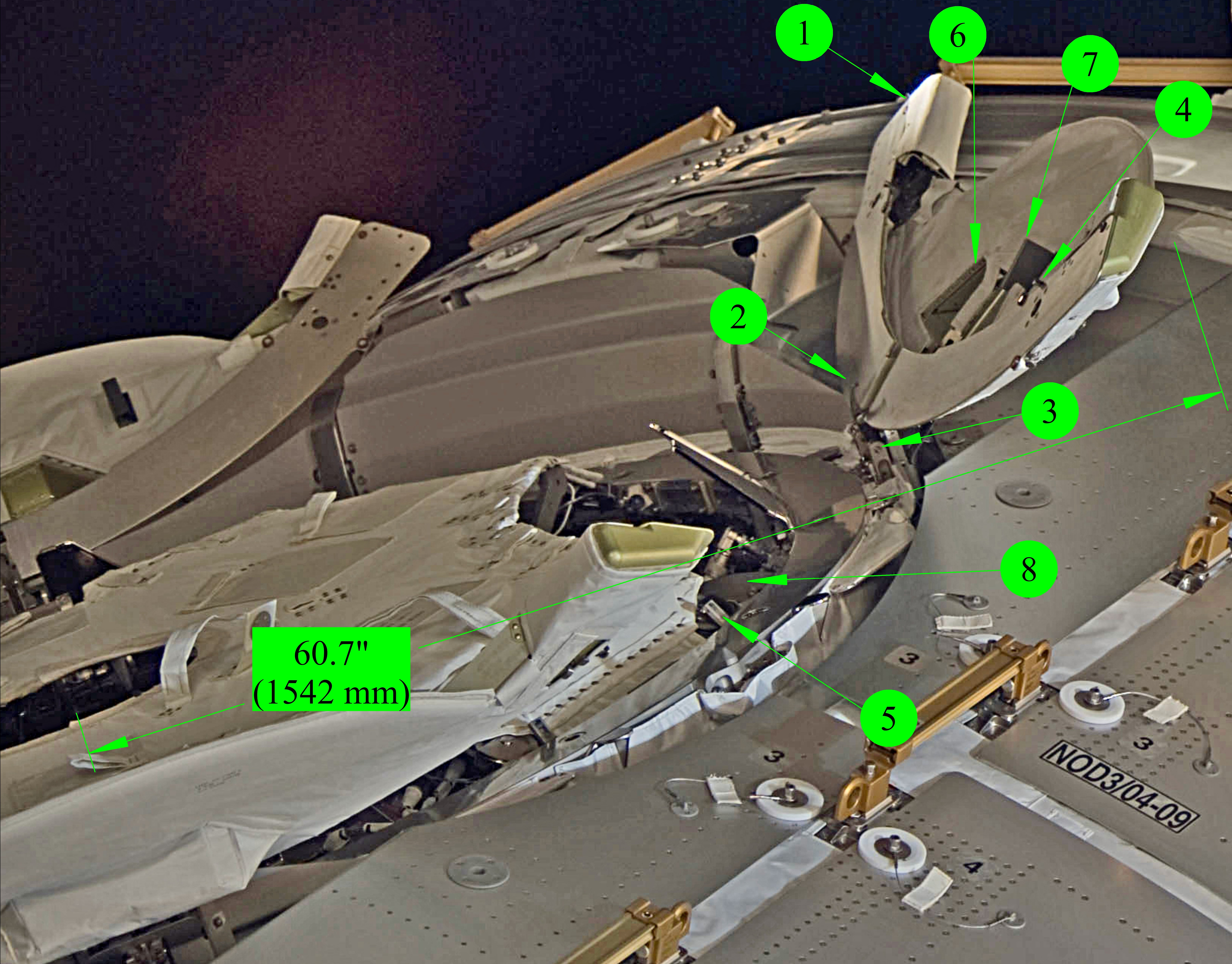
The petals (1) deploy outboard when the Capture Latch releases from roller link (2). The pivot point (3) is just outboard of the Capture Latch. Each petal has two launch locks (4) that fit into slots (5) atop the clevises, pockets (6) to accommodate Alignment Guides, and a feature (7) aligned with its respective Ready-to-Latch Indicator (8).

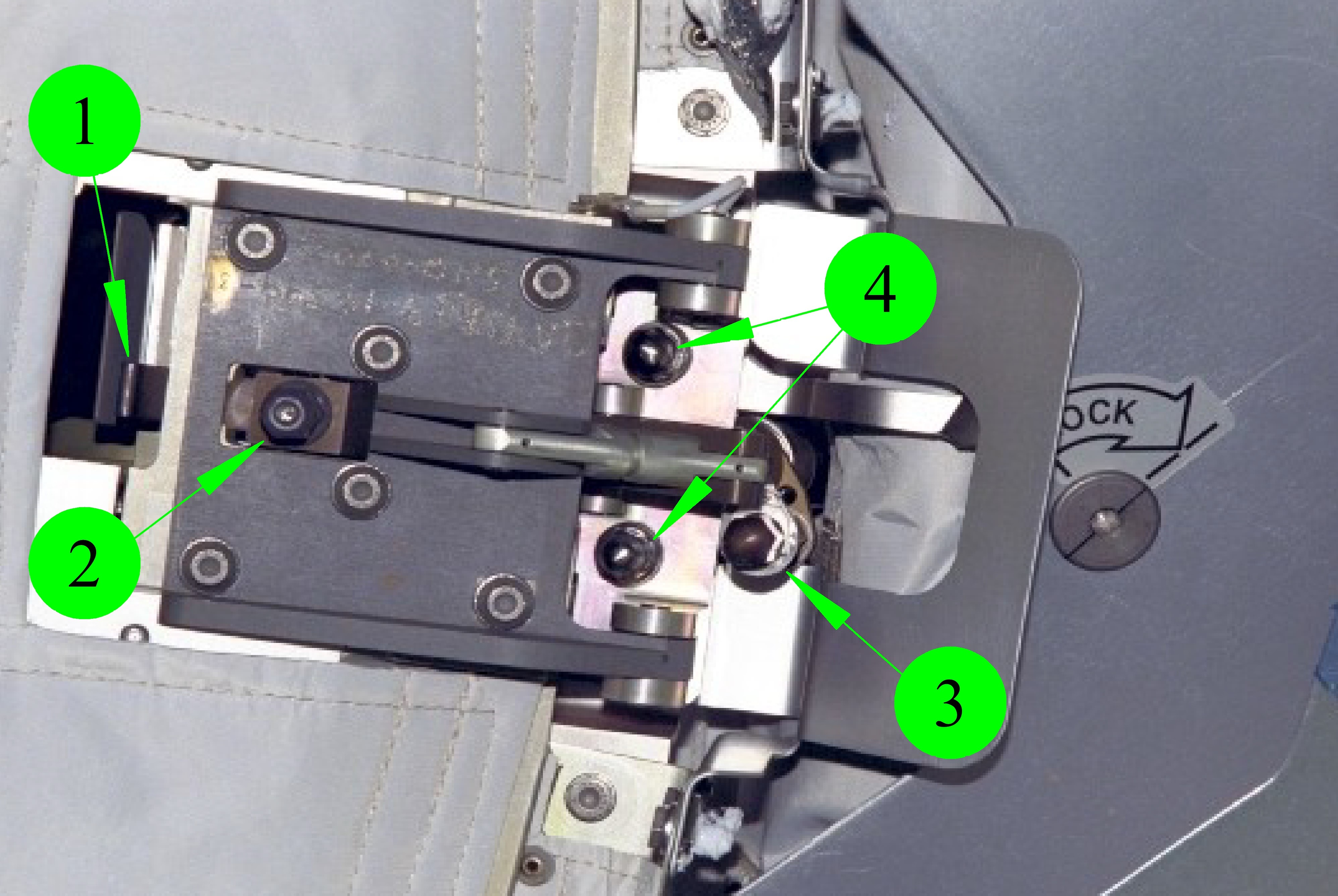
The deployable petal is grabbed by the Capture Latch at the tip of the Roller Link (1). If necessary, the link can be released during EVA by loosening a bolt (2). "Locking out" the spring-loaded actuator with a bolt (3) allows the astronaut to "safe" the mechanism before manual operation. The petal structure can be separated from the deployment mechanism with two bolts (4).

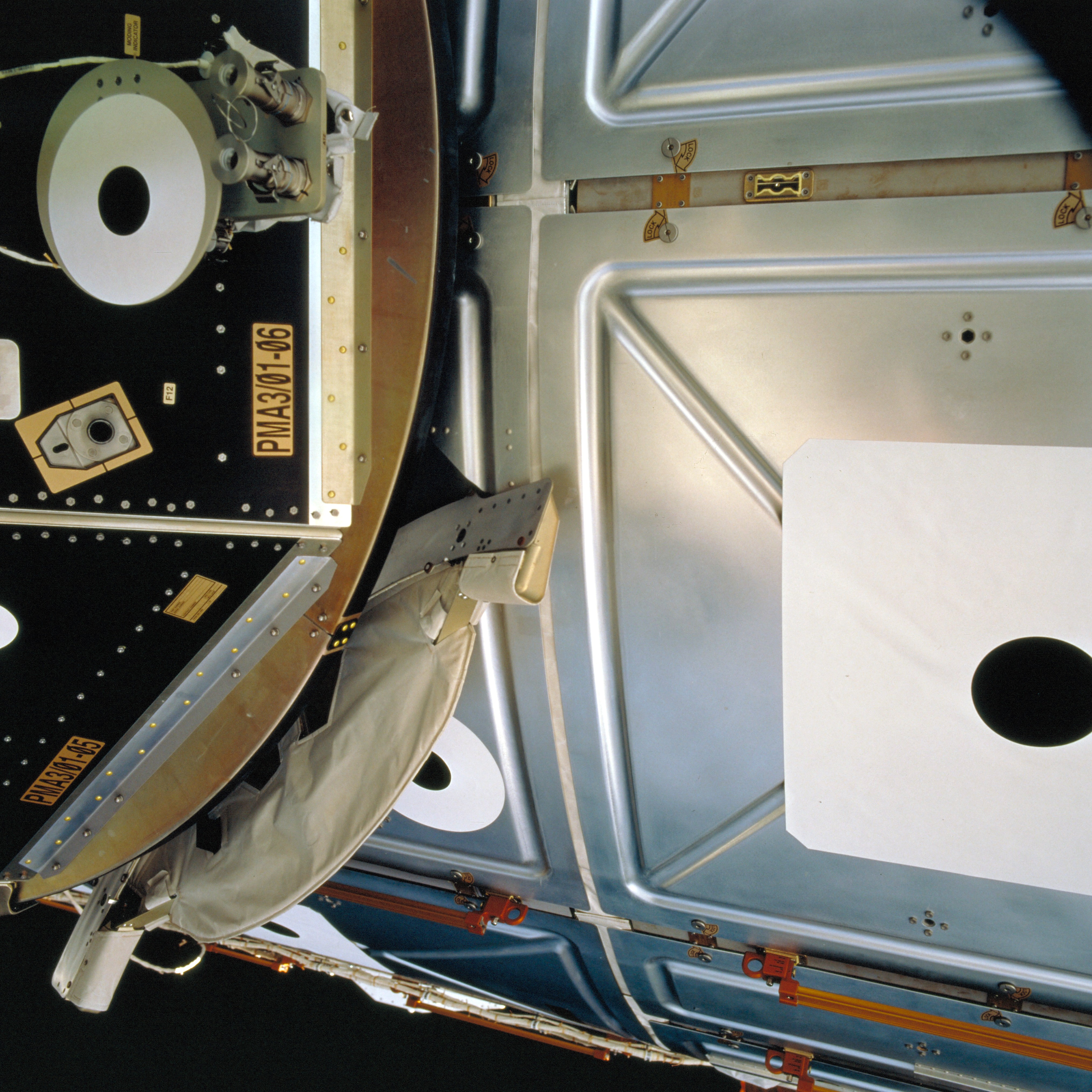
PMA-3's location on the nadir port of Node 1 Unity shows the tight fit between a berthed module and the deployed M/D Petal.

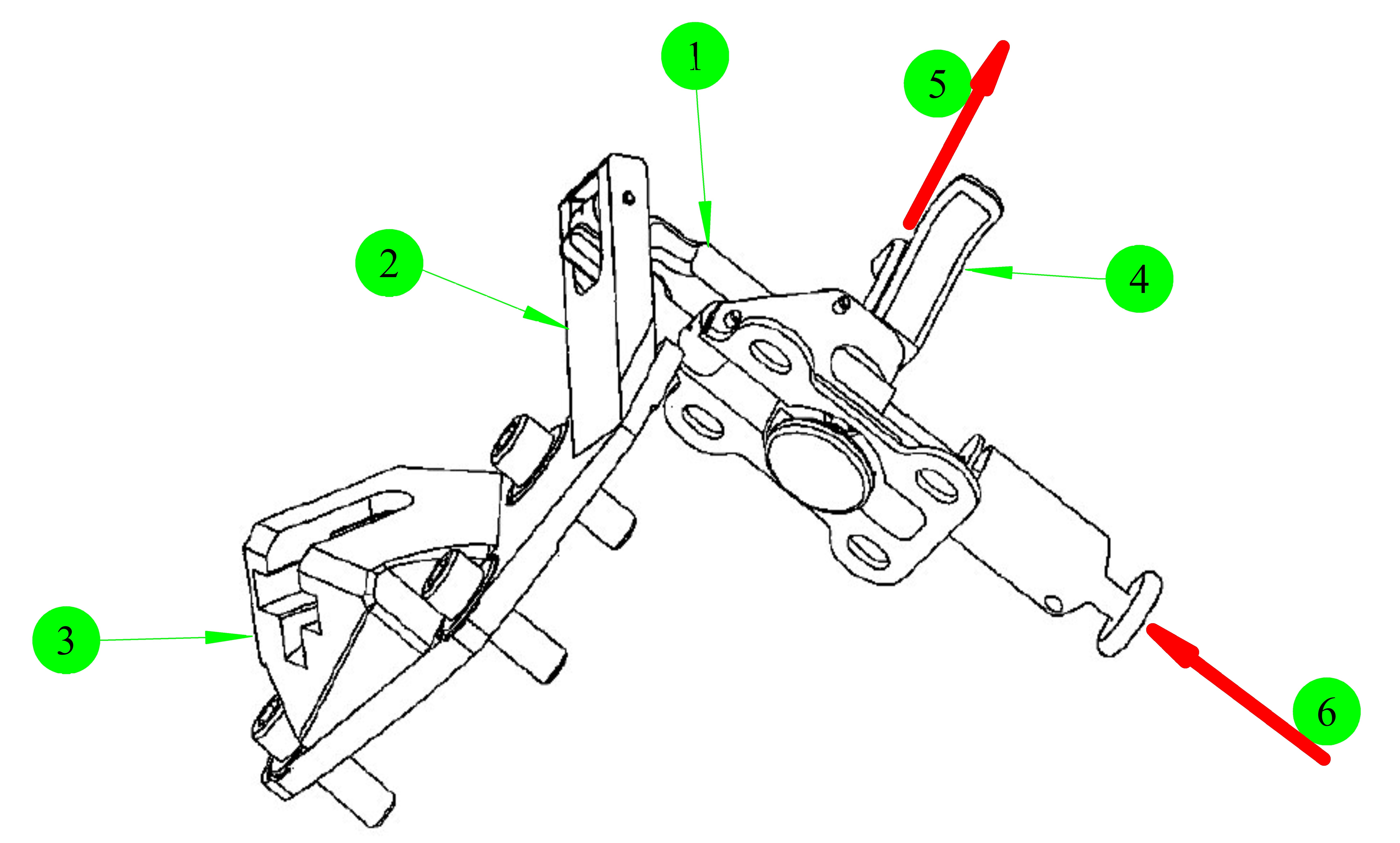
The petals are locked in place for launch by a pin (1) inserted through a fitting (2) on the M/D Center Section clevis (3). Release is effected by a T-handle (4), which is pulled (5) away from the ACBM. It can be re-locked by pushing (6) the pin back into the fitting.

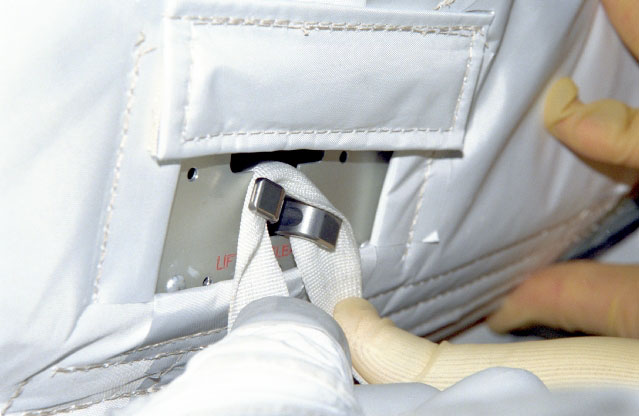
The petal is typically unlocked during EVA, using a conveniently located strap.

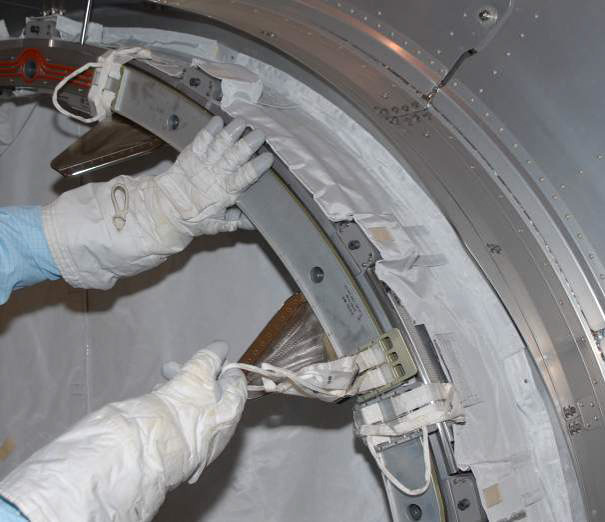
The CBM/CBM seal, mounted on the face of the PCBM, was covered to protect it from debris when launched in the shuttle. The seal, bolted to the face of the ring, peeks out beyond the cover in the top left corner of the image. Covers, which were removed by pre-berth EVA, are not used for logistics missions.

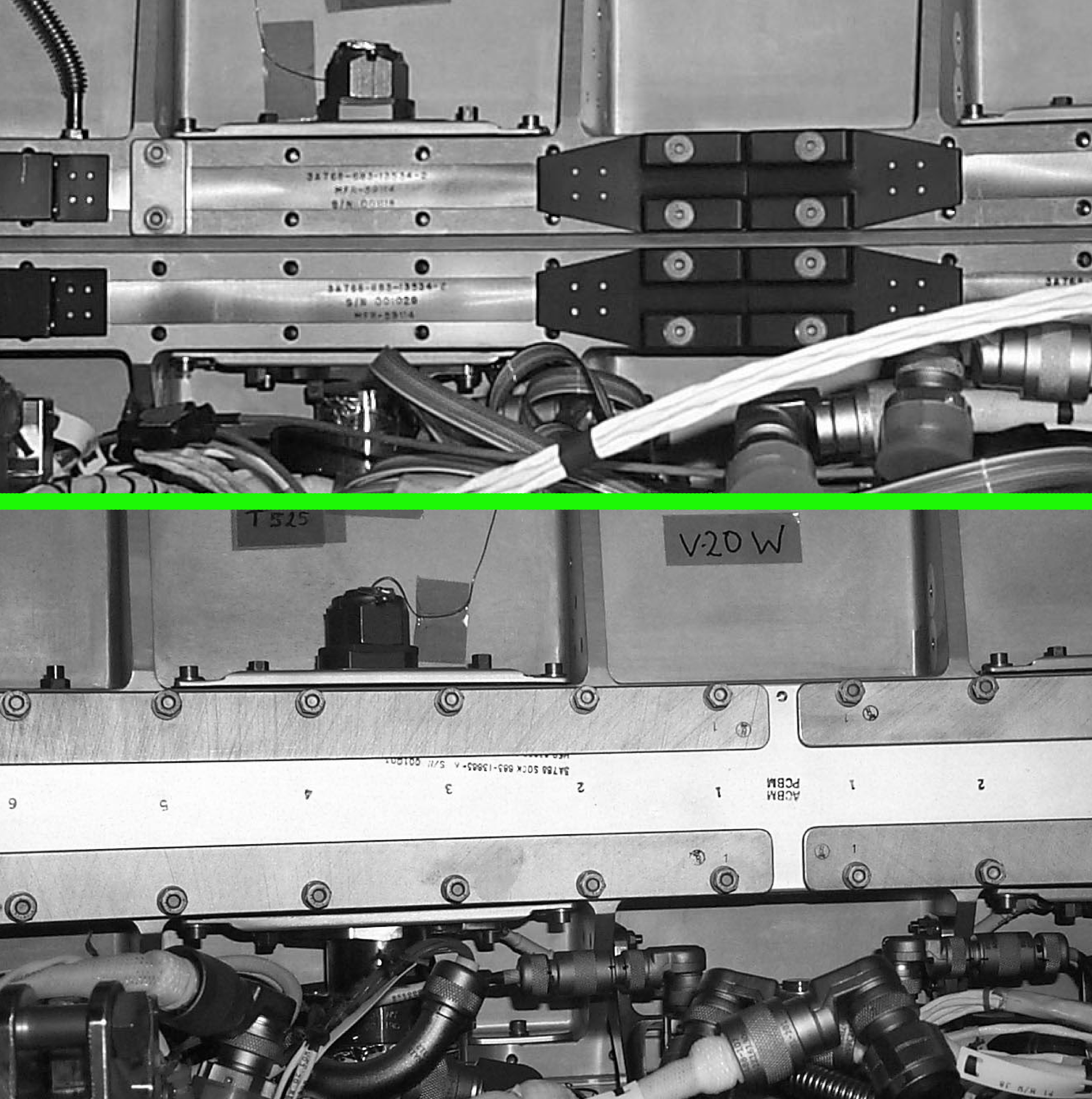
The CBM/CBM joint has provisions for installation of an IVA seal in case the primary seal fails. Like the primary, it is a segmented molded seal, but has beads only on the outboard face. The beads are squeezed against the inboard faces of the rings by compression plates, fastening into the same bolt pattern used to hold the protective covers. The lower and upper images show the CBM/CBM joint with and without the secondary seal hardware installed, respectively.

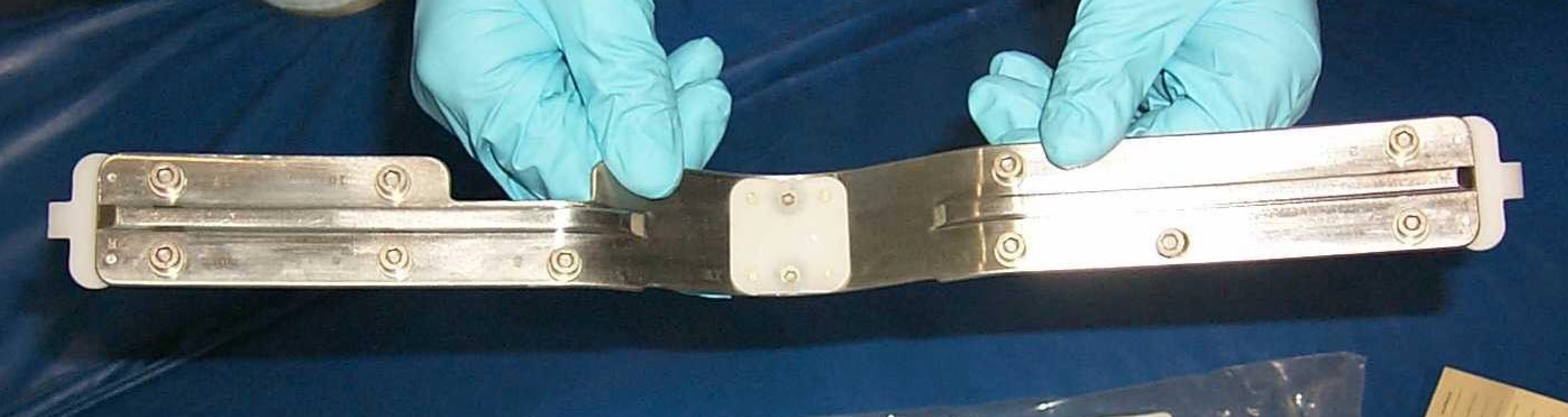
In the event of a leak at the joint where an ACBM is bolted to its parent module, an o-ring can be installed on the inside. The o-ring is compressed into the groove by a series of compression plates. This particular plate conforms to the joint's scallop.

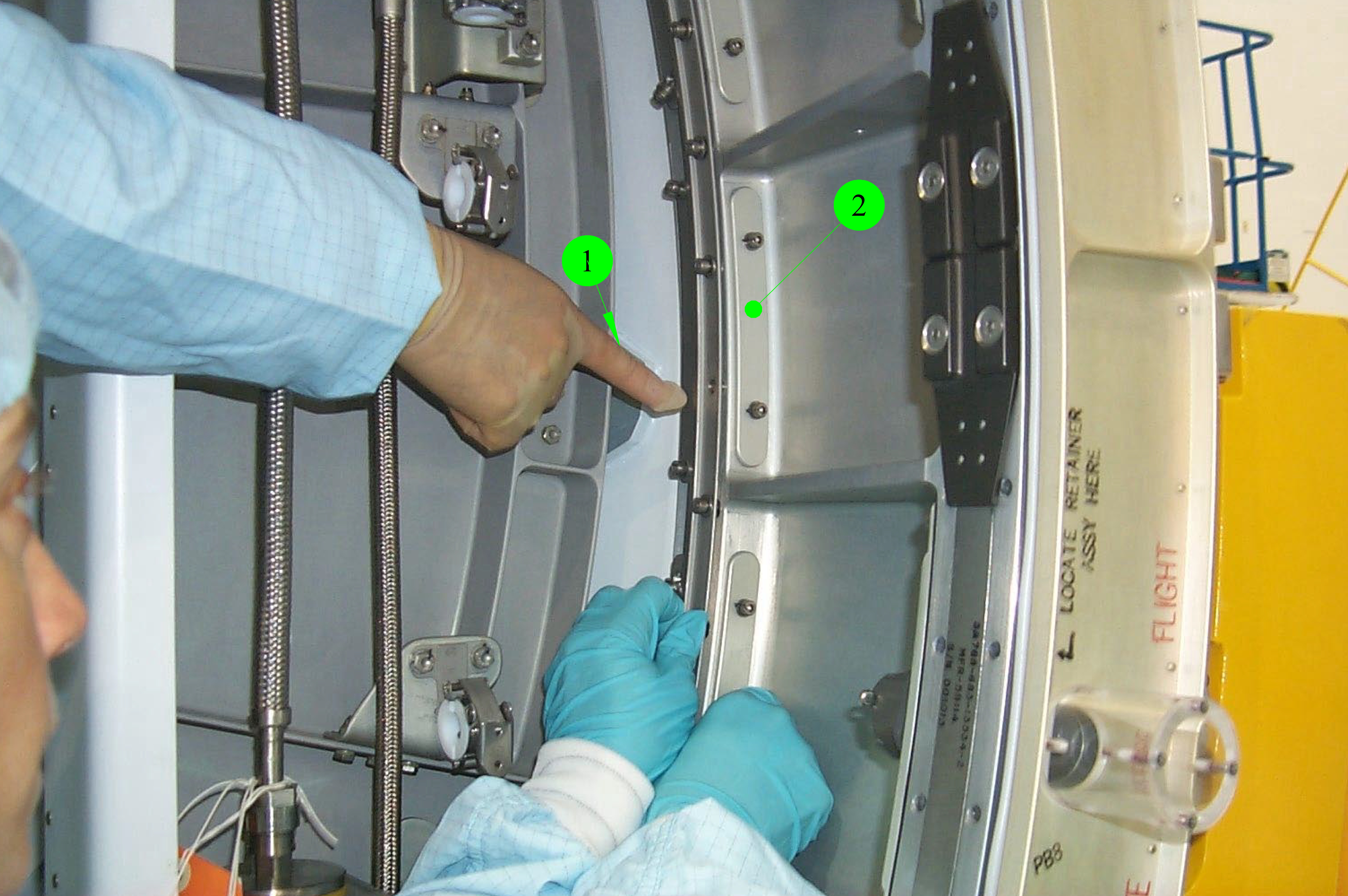
The Passive CBM provides for IVA seals where it is bolted to its parent Element. Here, a human finger (1) points to a main IVA seal compression plate, which would be installed over an o-ring. Covers (2) can also be placed over the joint's bolt heads, each of which is a potential leak path through the joint.

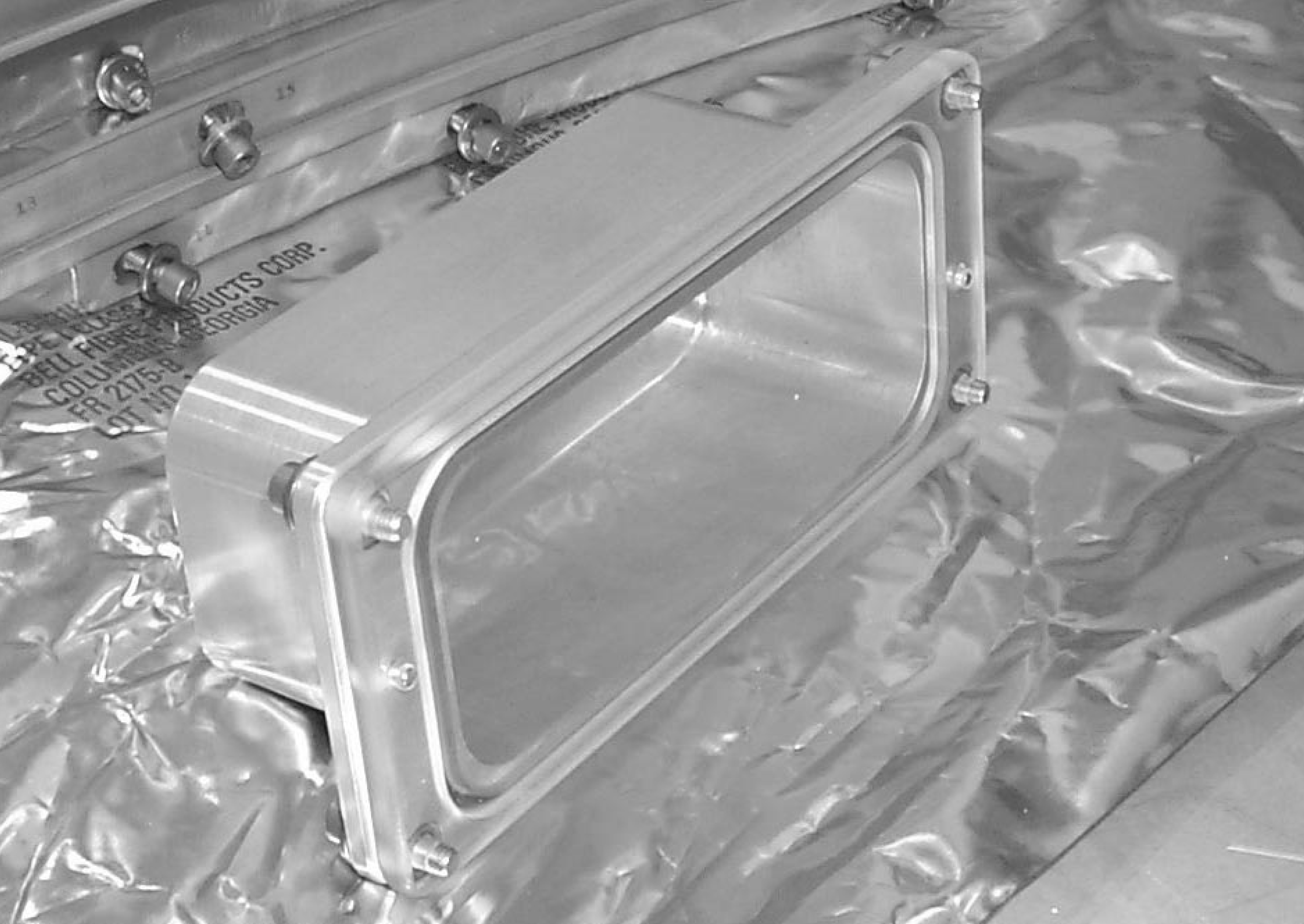
The "butter dish" covers seal the leak paths through (and around) Powered Bolts and Powered Bolt Nuts. When used on the ACBM's bolt, the actuator and upper housing are removed and a spline lock is installed inside the dish to keep the bolt from gradually backing out under cyclic loads.

=== Operations ===
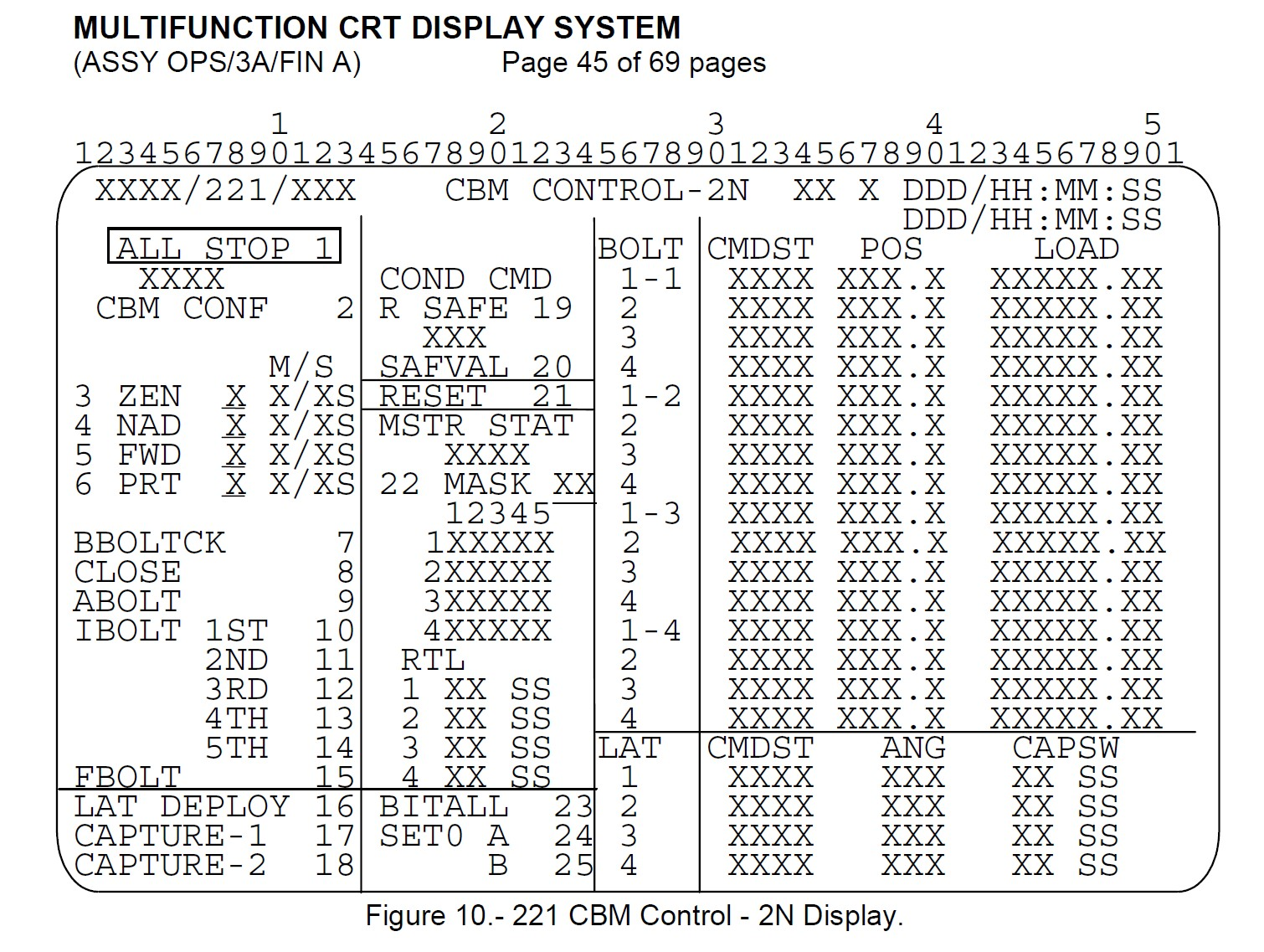
This display screen was used for operational control of the CBM during ISS assembly to stage 3A (STS-92). The image source contains detailed descriptions for each available berthing command and interprets each reportable status message.

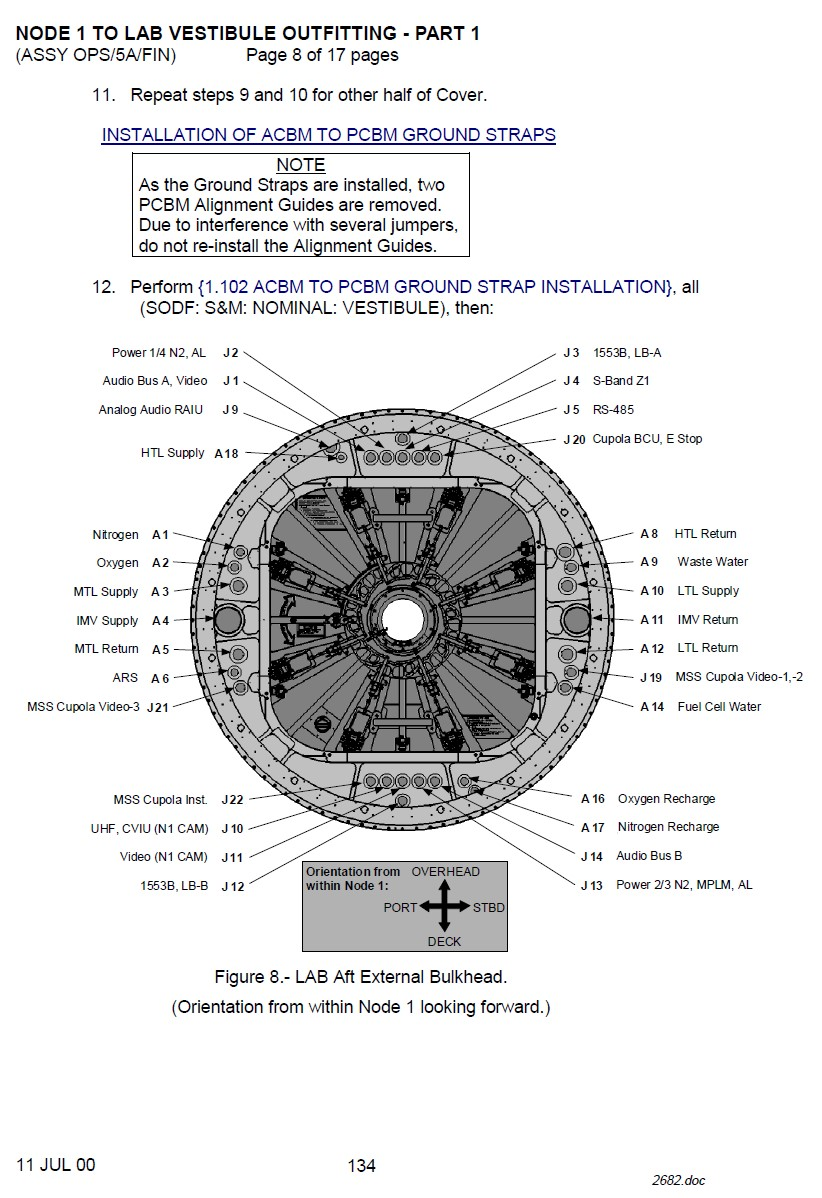
Connections to be made while outfitting the vestibule between Node 1 (Unity) and the US Lab (Destiny). The image source contains a detailed description of the outfitting procedure.

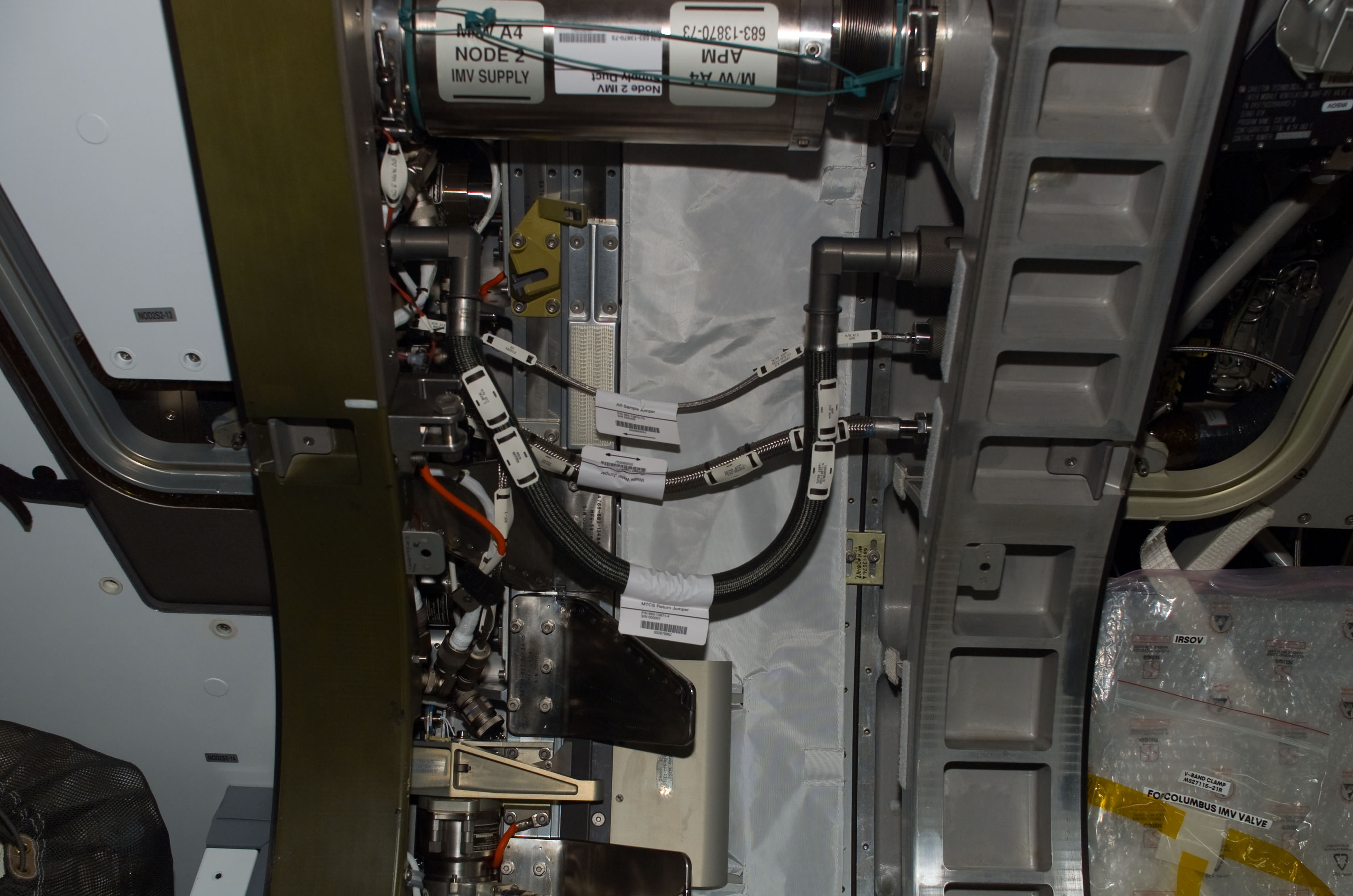
Vestibule jumpers, such as those shown here between Node 2 and the Columbus module, typically span between well-aligned connectors on facing bulkheads. See the discussion about routing in Link & Williams (2009).

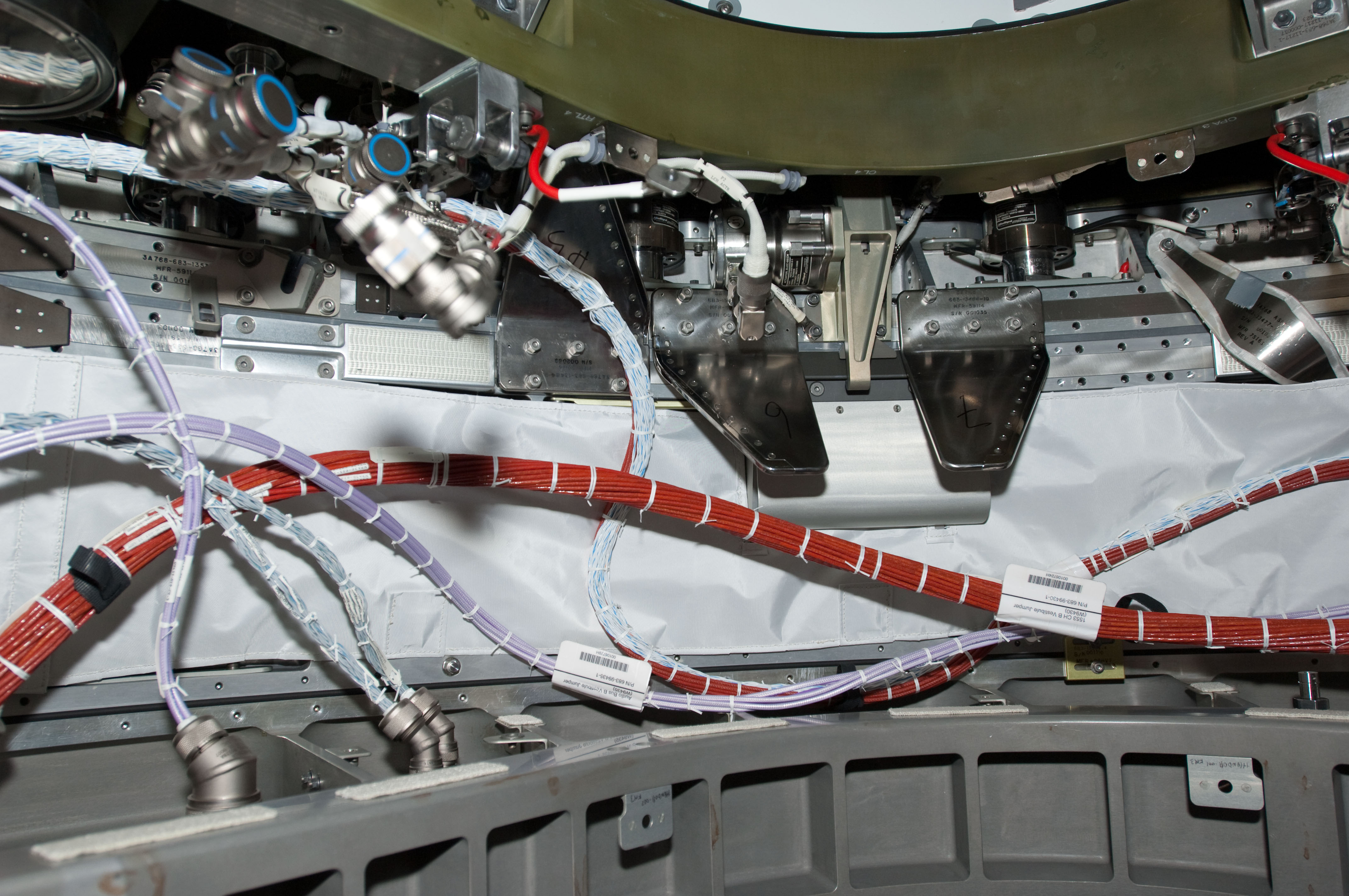
Jumpers in the vestibule between Nodes 1 and 3 are not well aligned because of revisions to the ISS design shortly before Node 3 was delivered to orbit. Node 1 utilities were re-routed by ISS Expedition 21 crew members between STS-129 and STS-130. See the detailed discussion in Link & Williams (2009).

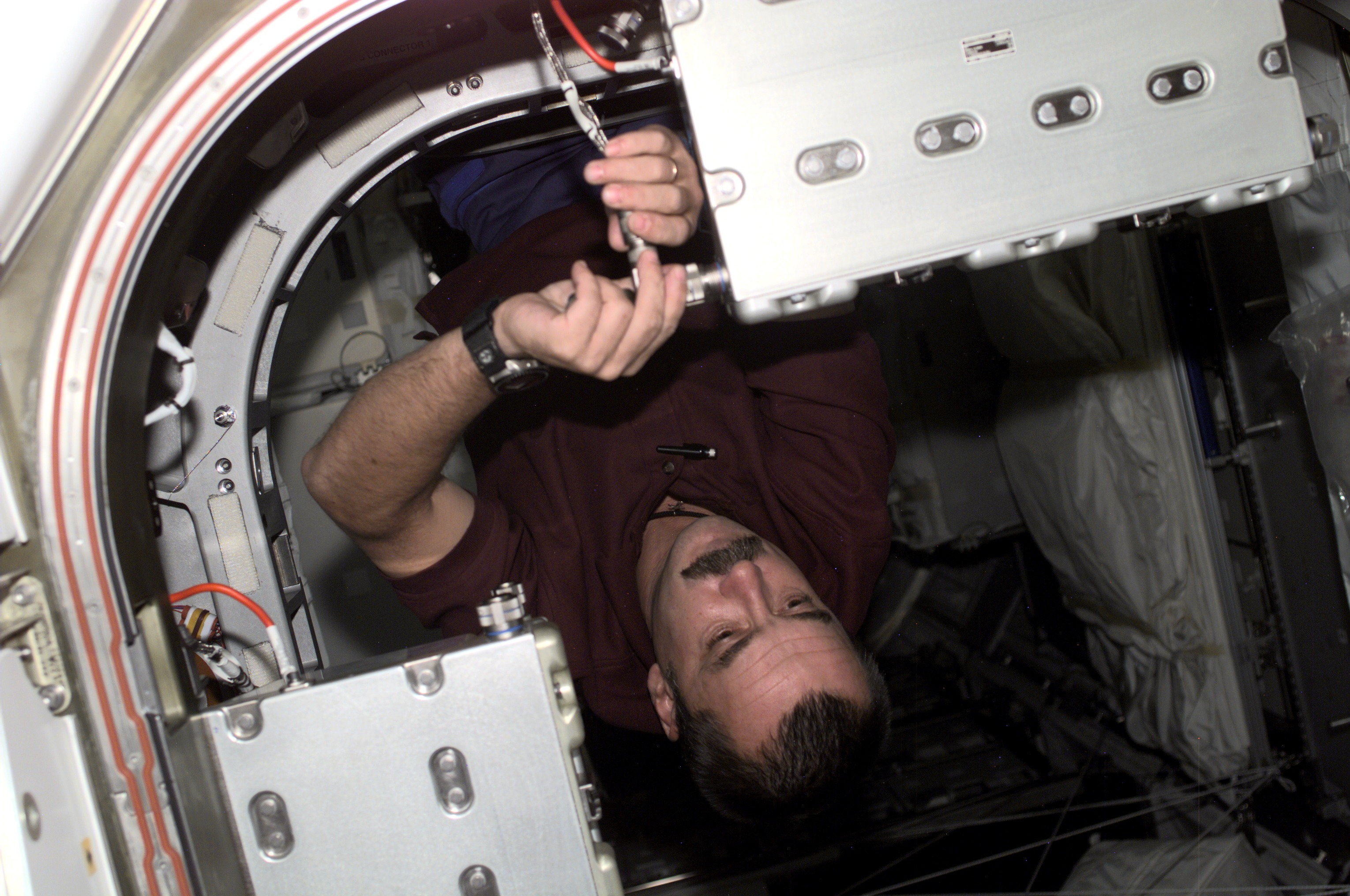
Mikhail Tyurin of Rosaviakosmos, Expedition 3 flight engineer, secures a connection on a Controller Power Assembly (CPA) in a hatchway on Unity Node 1.

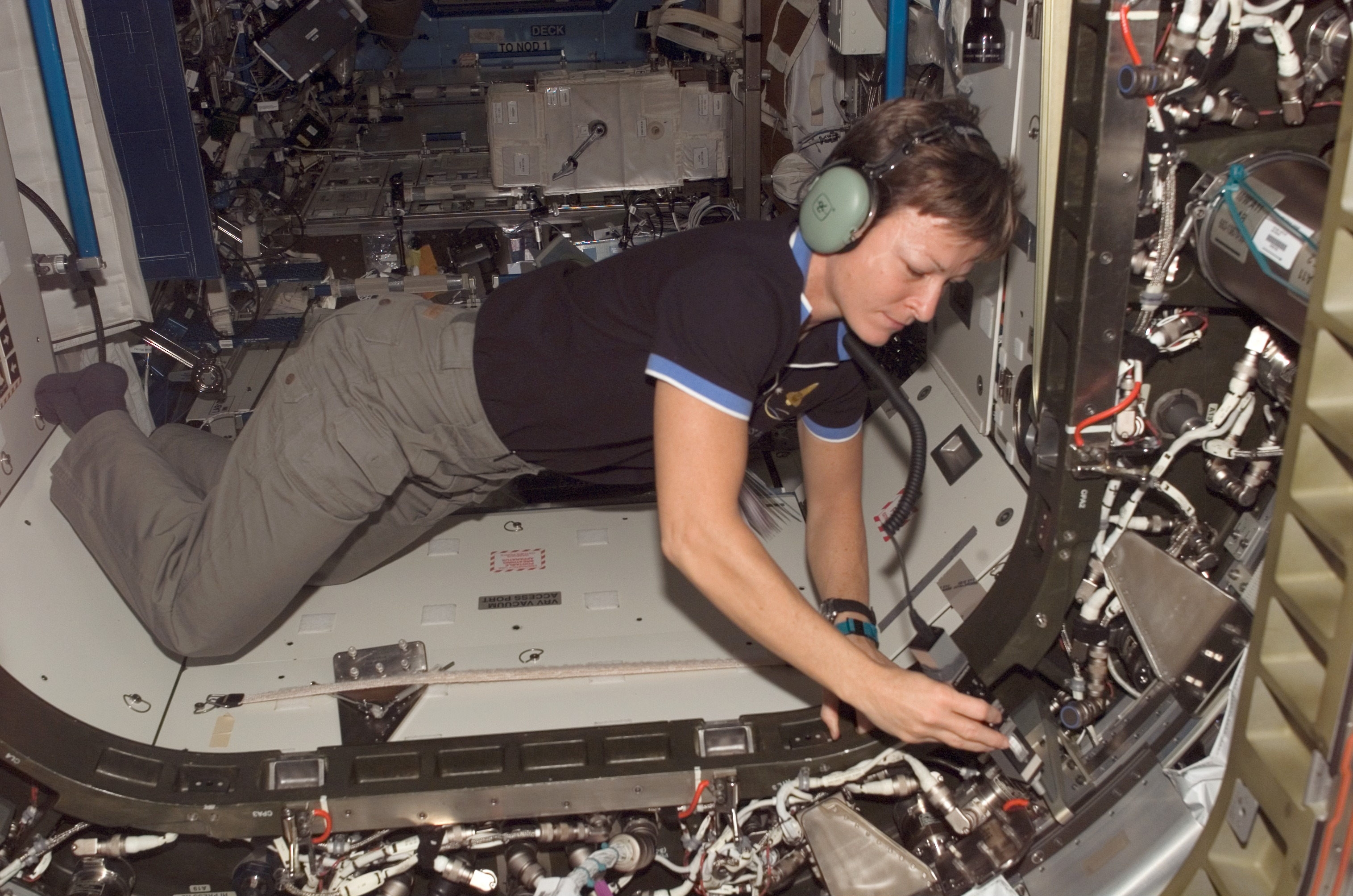
Astronaut Peggy Whitson, Expedition 16 commander, works in the vestibule between the Harmony node and Destiny laboratory of the International Space Station.

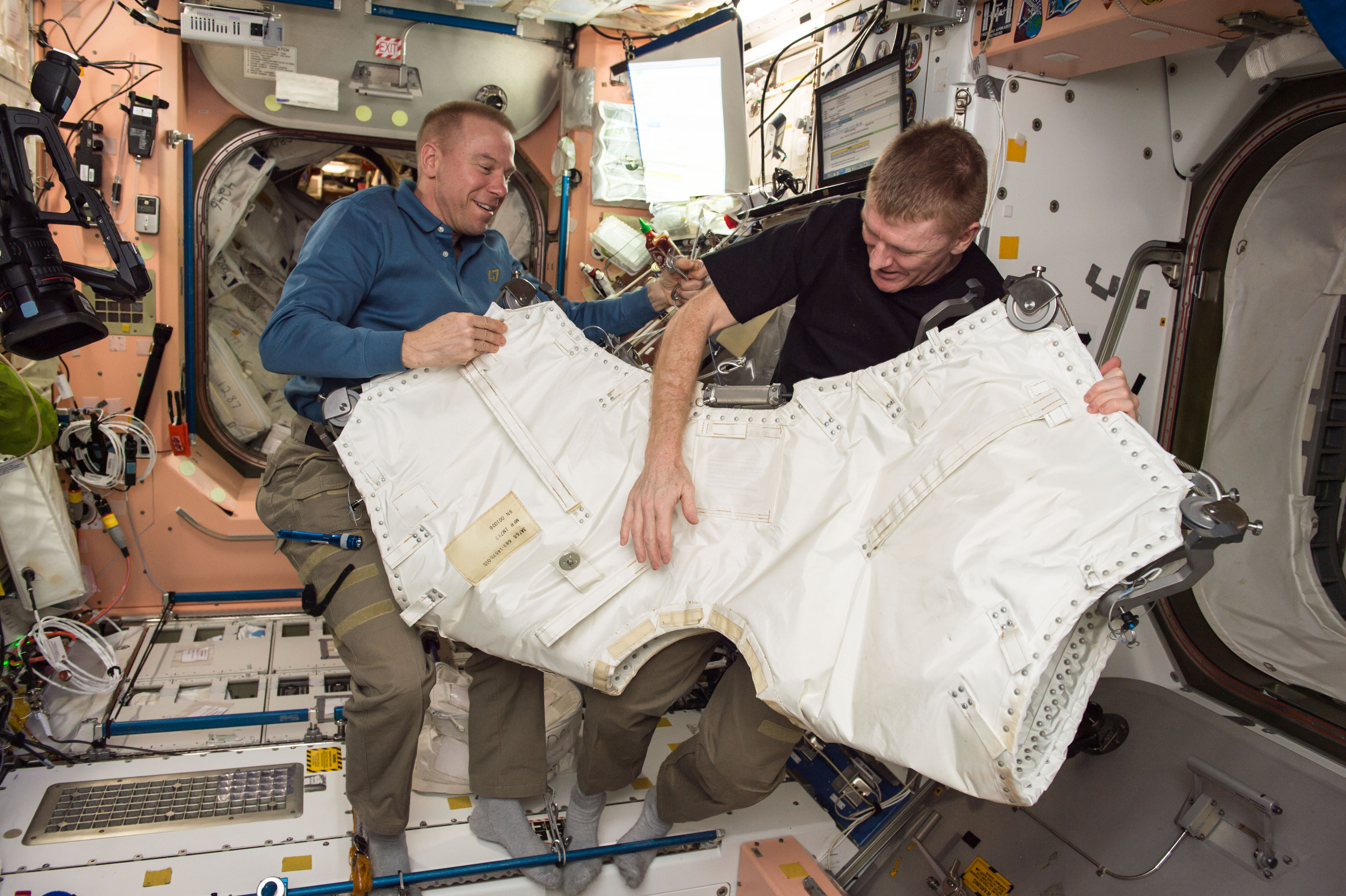
Anchored by their toes, Expedition 47 Commander Tim Kopra and Flight Engineer Tim Peake wrestle an M/D Cover Center Section into the vestibule while preparing for deberth of a Cygnus cargo vehicle from Node 1 (Unity).

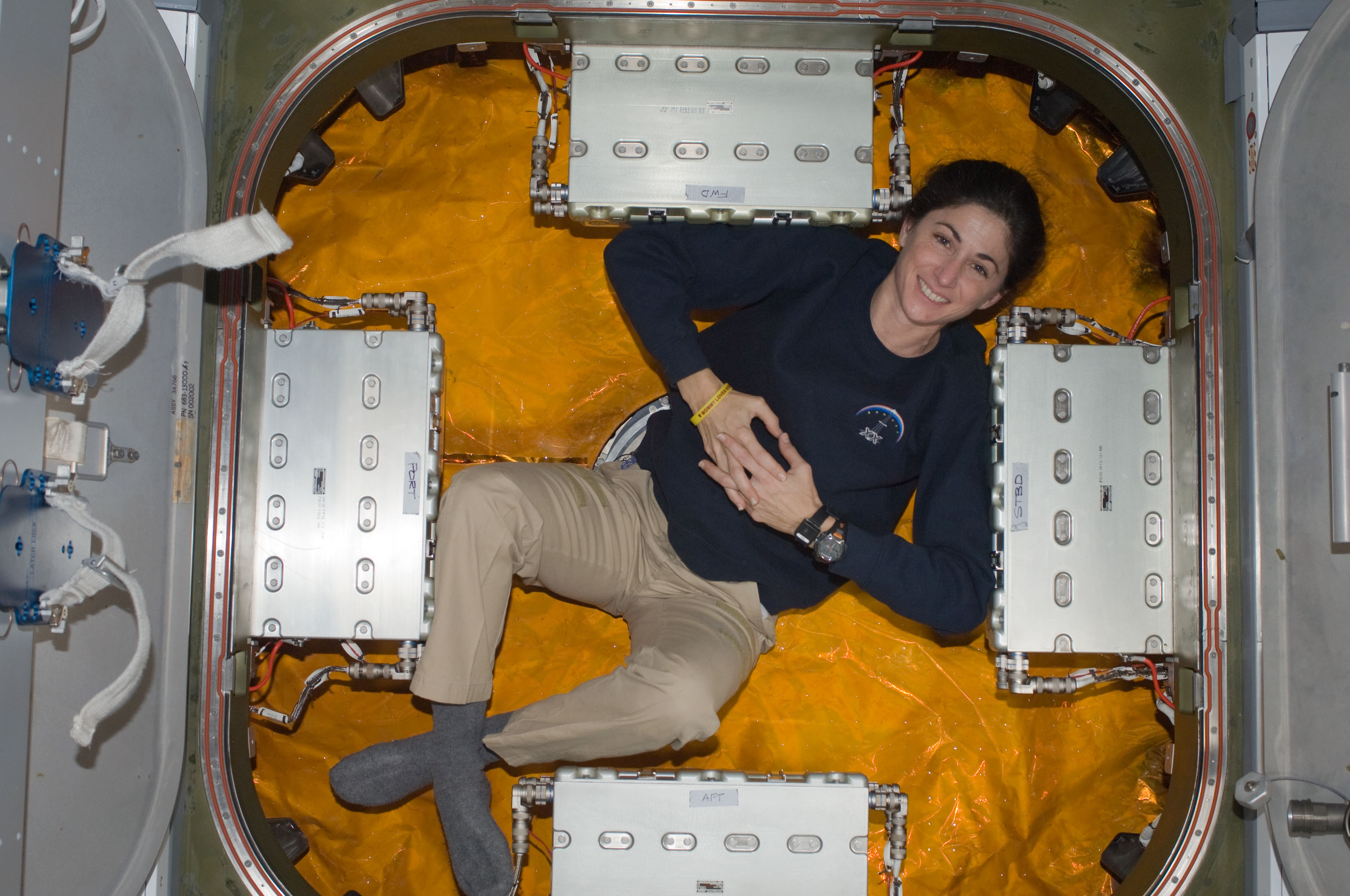
Posed in a soon-to-be-demated vestibule, Expedition 21 Flight Engineer Nicole Stott provides a sense of scale for both the CBM and the Common Hatch.

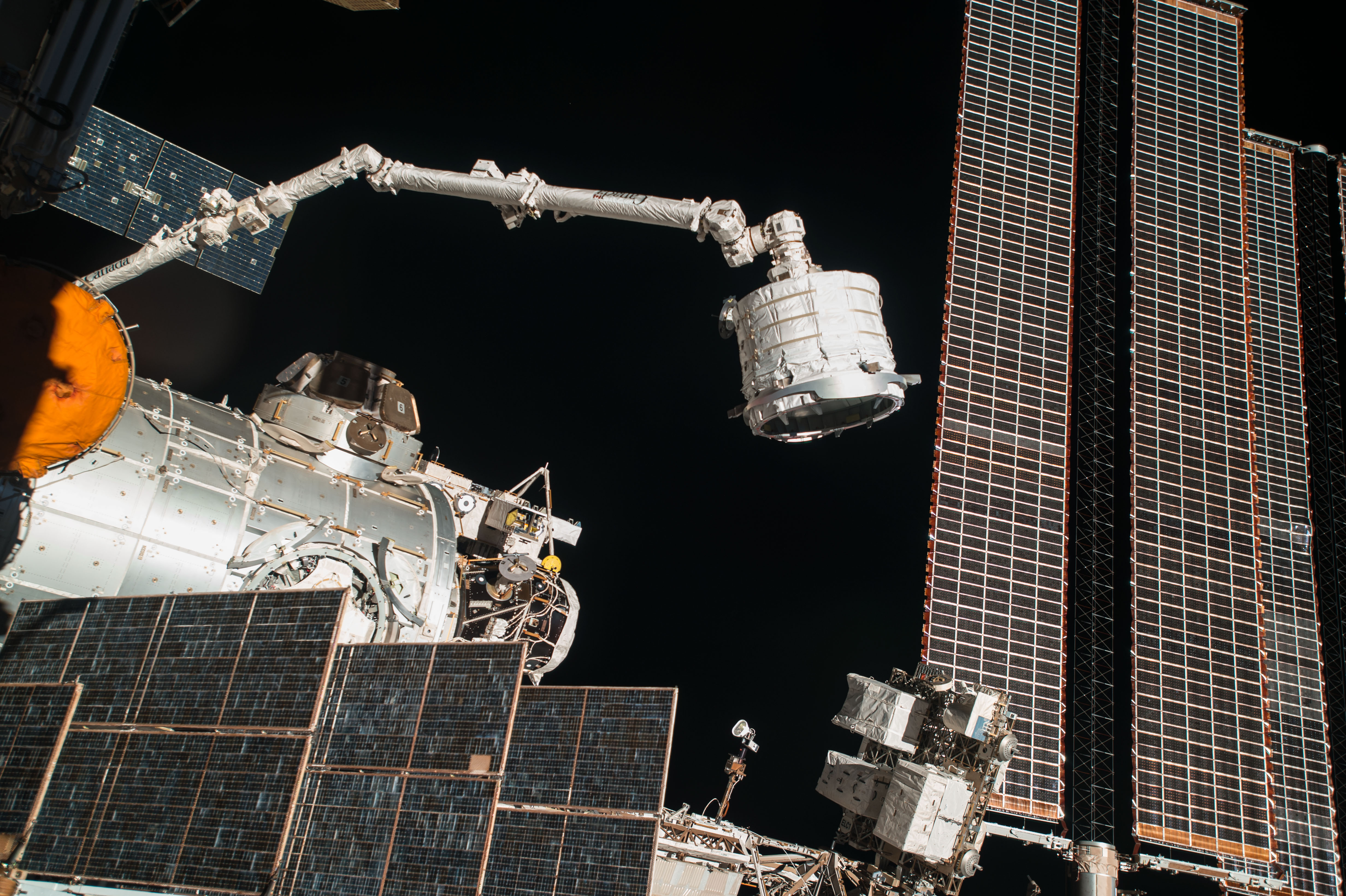
BEAM in the process of being moved to the rear port of Tranquility in April 2016.

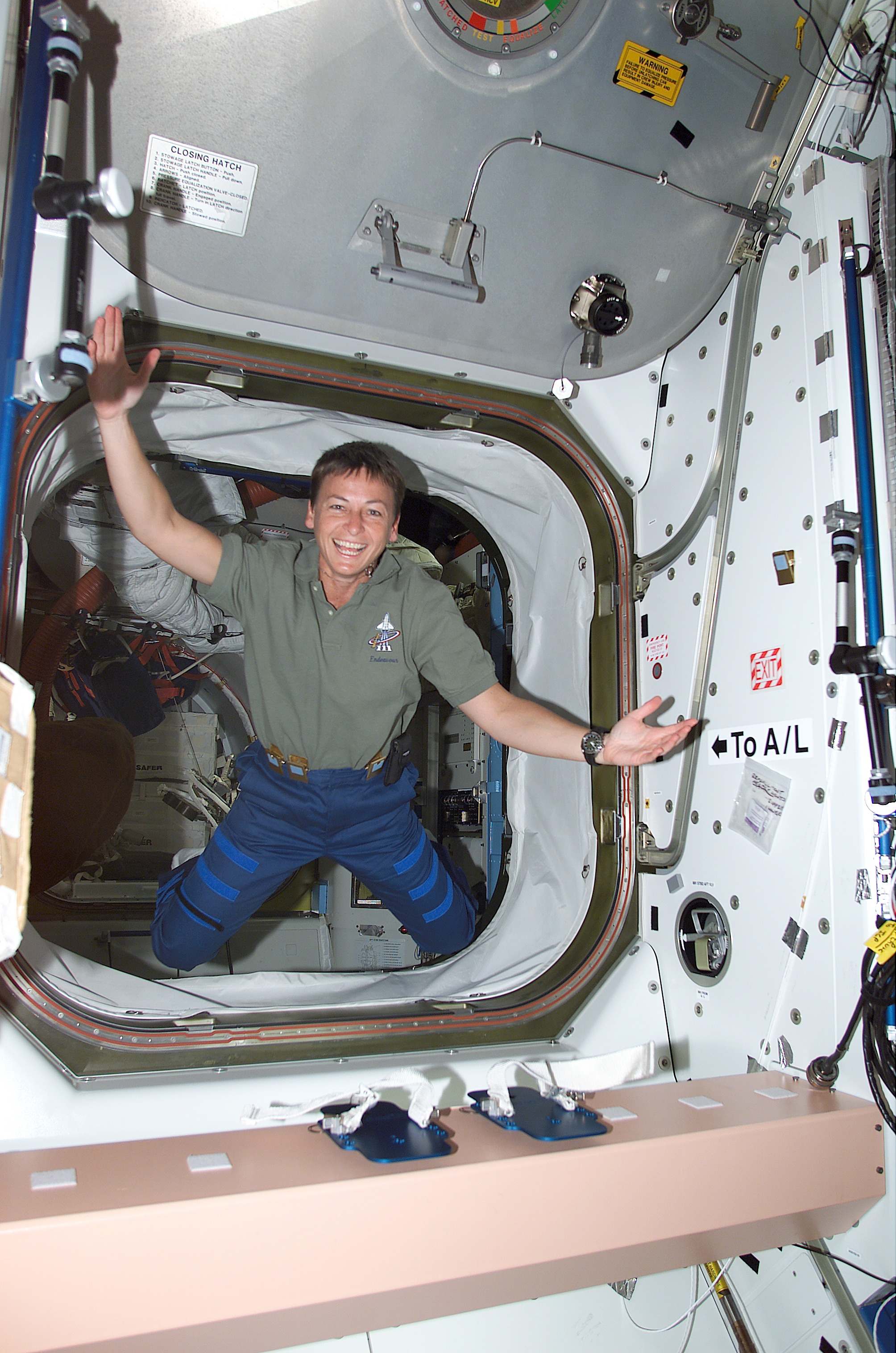
Expedition 5 Flight Engineer Peggy A. Whitson demonstrates proper form for floating through a fully outfitted vestibule.

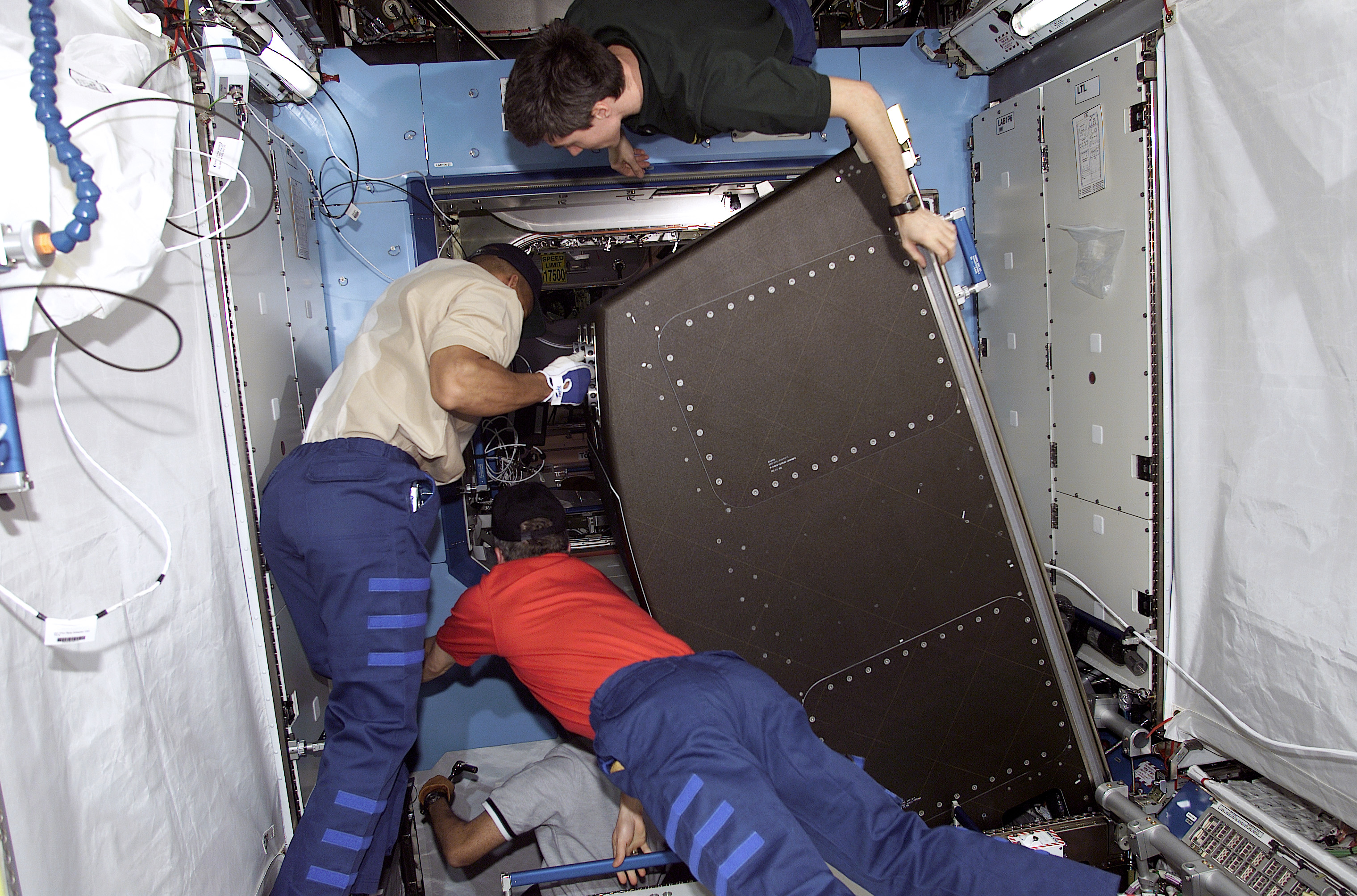
The size of the CBM enabled construction of the ISS to defer installation of rack-sized packages until after launch of the modules. Deferral enabled the program's adjustment to changes in orbital inclination, accommodating impacts to the payload capability of the Shuttle.
Relocation of PMM "Leonardo" by the SSRMS.

The SSRMS grapples the free-flying CRS-12 module and maneuvers it to the ISS for berthing

== Missions ==
Uses of the CBM (as of May 2020) are tabulated below. Timing for the factory mates of PMA-1 and PMA-2 to Node 1 are approximate. See Reference to the ISS (Utilization) (NASA/ISSP, 2015) for berths through April, 2015; additional information is available for the Shuttle flights as noted in the PCBM Element column. Later berths are substantiated in the Notes column, as are anomalies and relevant information in NASA flight status reports and other documentation.

Berth	PCBM Element	Time Frame	Purpose	ACBM Element	Orientation	Notes
1	PMA-1	09/1998	Assembly	Node 1	Aft	Factory Mate
2	PMA-2	09/1998	Assembly	Node 1	Forward	Factory Mate
3	Z1	10/2000	Assembly	Node 1	Zenith	
4	PMA-3	10/2000	Assembly	Node 1	Nadir	
5	PMA-2	02/2001	Assembly	US Lab	Forward	
6	U.S. Lab (Destiny)	02/2001	Assembly	Node 1	Forward	
7	PMA-3	03/2001	Assembly	Node 1	Port	
8	MPLM (STS-102)	03/2001	Logistics	Node 1	Nadir	
9	MPLM (STS-100)	04/2001	Logistics	Node 1	Nadir	
10	Airlock (Quest)	06/2001	Assembly	Node 1	Starboard	
11	MPLM (STS-105)	08/2001	Logistics	Node 1	Nadir	
12	MPLM (STS-108)	12/2001	Logistics	Node 1	Nadir	
13	MPLM (STS-111)	06/2002	Logistics	Node 1	Nadir	
14	MPLM (STS-114)	07/2005	Logistics	Node 1	Nadir	
15	MPLM (STS-121)	06/2006	Logistics	Node 1	Nadir	
16	PMA-3	08/2007	Assembly	Node 1	Nadir	Intermittent faults while unbolting. On-Orbit Status Archive (NASA/HQ, 2007), p. 816
17	Node 2 (Harmony)	10/2007	Assembly	Node 1	Port	Bolt 1–4 remained failed since PMA-3 demate. Problem believed to be a small, linear negative shift in the load cell. No change to commands. STS-120/FD04 Execute Pkg. (NASA/MCC, 2007)
18	PMA-2	11/2007	Assembly	Node 2	Starboard	
19	Node 2 (Harmony) + PMA-2	11/2007	Assembly	US Lab	Forward	
20	European Research Laboratory (Columbus)	02/2008	Assembly	Node 2	Starboard	FOD reported on Node 2 Starboard ACBM ring surface; EVA cleaning process established. STS-122/FD05 Execute Pkg. (NASA/MCC, 2008)
21	ELM-PS	03/2008	Assembly	Node 2	Zenith	
22	Japanese Experiment Module (Kibo)	05/2008	Assembly	Node 2	Port	
23	ELM-PS	05/2008	Assembly	JEM	Zenith	
24	MPLM (STS-126)	11/2008	Logistics	Node 2	Nadir	
25	PMA-3	08/2009	Assembly	Node 1	Port	
26	MPLM (STS-128)	08/2009	Logistics	Node 2	Nadir	Bolt 4-1, Node 2 Nadir: high torque on berth, jammed on deberth (replaced IVA); Load cell drift noted on bolt 2-1; Previous incidence of damage to CPA connectors reported. STS-128/FD10 Execute Pkg. (NASA/MCC, 2009), STS-128/FD11 Execute Pkg. (NASA/MCC, 2009)
27	ISS-HTV1	09/2009	Logistics	Node 2	Nadir	
28	PMA-3	01/2010	Assembly	Node 2	Zenith	Multiple bolt jams during Cupola deberth.Operating an Outpost (Dempsey, 2018)
29	Node 3 (Tranquility) + Cupola (STS-130)	02/2010	Assembly	Node 1	Port	Multiple bolt jams during Cupola deberth.Operating an Outpost (Dempsey, 2018)
30	PMA-3	02/2010	Assembly	Node 3	Port	Multiple bolt jams during Cupola deberth.Operating an Outpost (Dempsey, 2018)
31	Cupola	02/2010	Assembly	Node 3	Nadir	Multiple bolt jams during Cupola deberth.Operating an Outpost (Dempsey, 2018)
32	MPLM (STS-131)	04/2010	Logistics	Node 2	Nadir	
33	ISS-HTV2	01/2011	Logistics	Node 2	Nadir	OOS – 01/27/11 (NASA/HQ, 2011)
34	PMM	02/2011	Assembly	Node 1	Nadir	
35	MPLM (STS-135)	07/2011	Logistics	Node 2	Nadir	
36	ISS-SpX-D	05/2012	Logistics	Node 1	Nadir	
37	ISS-HTV3	07/2012	Logistics	Node 2	Nadir	
38	ISS-SpX-1	10/2012	Logistics	Node 2	Nadir	
39	ISS-SpX-2	03/2013	Logistics	Node 2	Nadir	
40	ISS-HTV4	08/2013	Logistics	Node 2	Nadir	
41	ISS-Orb-D1	09/2013	Logistics	Node 2	Nadir	
42	ISS-Orb-1	01/2014	Logistics	Node 2	Nadir	
43	ISS-SpX-3	04/2014	Logistics	Node 2	Nadir	Only 15 of 16 bolts. 16th bolt was binding. DSR – 04/20/14 (NASA/HQ, 2014)
44	ISS-Orb-2	07/2014	Logistics	Node 2	Nadir	
45	ISS-SpX-4	09/2014	Logistics	Node 2	Nadir	
46	ISS-SpX-5	01/2015	Logistics	Node 2	Nadir	DSR – 01/12/15 (NASA/HQ, 2015)
47	ISS-SpX-6	04/2015	Logistics	Node 2	Nadir	DSR – 04/17/15 (NASA/HQ, 2015)
48	HTV-5	08/2015	Logistics	Node 2	Nadir	DSR – 08/24/15 (NASA/HQ, 2015)
49	OA-4	12/2015	Logistics	Node 1	Nadir	DSR – 12/09/15 (NASA/HQ, 2015)
50	OA-6	03/2016	Logistics	Node 1	Nadir	DSR – 03/28/16 (NASA/HQ, 2016)
51	ISS-SpX-8	04/2016	Logistics	Node 2	Nadir	DSR – 04/18/16 (NASA/HQ, 2016)
52	BEAM	04/2016	Assembly	Node 3	Aft	DSR – 04/18/16 (NASA/HQ, 2016)
53	ISS-SpX-9	07/2016	Logistics	Node 2	Nadir	DSR – 07/20/16 (NASA/HQ, 2016)
54	OA-5	10/2016	Logistics	Node 1	Nadir	DSR – 10/23/2016 (NASA/HQ, 2016)
55	HTV-6	12/2016	Logistics	Node 2	Nadir	DSR – 12/13/2016 (NASA/HQ, 2016)
56	ISS-SpX-10	02/2017	Logistics	Node 2	Nadir	DSR – 2/23/2017 (NASA/HQ, 2017)
57	PMA-3	03/2017	Assembly	Node 2	Zenith	DSR – 3/27/2017 (NASA/HQ, 2017)
58	OA-7	04/2017	Logistics	Node 1	Nadir	DSR – 4/24/2017 (NASA/HQ, 2017)
59	ISS-SpX-11	06/2017	Logistics	Node 2	Nadir	DSR – 6/05/2017 (NASA/HQ, 2017). ACBM ring face was cleaned by EVA the previous March. DSR – 3/30/2017 (NASA/HQ, 2017)
60	ISS-SpX-12	08/2017	Logistics	Node 2	Nadir	DSR – 8/16/2017 (NASA/HQ, 2017)
61	OA-8E	11/2017	Logistics	Node 1	Nadir	DSR – 11/14/2017 (NASA/HQ, 2017)
62	ISS-SpX-13	12/2017	Logistics	Node 2	Nadir	DSR – 12/17/2017 (NASA/HQ, 2017)
63	ISS-SpX-14	04/2018	Logistics	Node 2	Nadir	DSR – 4/04/2018 (NASA/HQ, 2018)
64	OA-9E	05/2018	Logistics	Node 1	Nadir	DSR – 5/24/2018 (NASA/HQ, 2018)
65	ISS-SpX-15	06/2018	Logistics	Node 2	Nadir	DSR – 7/02/2018 (NASA/HQ, 2018)
66	HTV-7	09/2018	Logistics	Node 2	Nadir	DSR – 9/27/2018 (NASA/HQ, 2018)
67	ISS-SpX-16	12/2018	Logistics	Node 2	Nadir	DSR – 12/08/2018 (NASA/HQ, 2018)
68	CRS NG-11	04/2019	Logistics	Node 1	Nadir	DSR – 04/19/2019 (NASA/HQ, 2019). ACBM ring face was cleaned by EVA the previous March. DSR – 03/22/2019 (NASA/HQ, 2019)
69	ISS-SpX-17	05/2019	Logistics	Node 2	Nadir	DSR – 05/06/2019 (NASA/HQ, 2019)
70	ISS-SpX-18	07/2019	Logistics	Node 2	Nadir	DSR – 07/28/2019 (NASA/HQ, 2019)
71	HTV-8	09/2019	Logistics	Node 2	Nadir	ISS Status – 09/28/2019 (NASA/HQ, 2019)
72	CRS NG-12	11/2019	Logistics	Node 1	Nadir	DSR – 11/04/2019 (NASA/HQ, 2019).
73	ISS-SpX-19	12/2019	Logistics	Node 2	Nadir	DSR – 12/08/2019 (NASA/HQ, 2019)
74	CRS NG-13	02/2020	Logistics	Node 1	Nadir	DSR – 02/18/2020 (NASA/HQ, 2020)
75	ISS-SpX-20	3/2020	Logistics	Node 2	Nadir	DSR – 03/09/2020 (NASA/HQ, 2020)
76	HTV-9	05/2020	Logistics	Node 2	Nadir	ISS Status – 05/25/2020 (NASA/HQ, 2020)
77	CRS NG-14	10/2020	Logistics	Node 1	Nadir	ISS Status – 10/05/2020 (NASA/HQ, 2020)
78	Bishop NRAL	12/2020	NRAL Ops	Node 3	Port	ISS Status – 12/21/2020 (NASA/HQ, 2020). Initial delivery to orbit.
79	CRS NG-15	02/2021	Logistics	Node 1	Nadir	ISS Status – 02/22/2021 (NASA/HQ, 2021)

== Glossary ==
Many terms used in the CBM literature are not always consistent with usage in other contexts. Some were defined specific to the development program. Definitions are included here to improve continuity with the references, and with other topics.

Acceptance
"A process which demonstrates that an item was manufactured as designed with adequate workmanship, performs in accordance with specification requirements, and is acceptable for delivery." Contrast with Qualification. See the Environmental Test Requirements (NASA/ISSP, 2003) page 10-1.
Analysis
In the formal context, verification by technical or mathematical models or simulation, algorithms, charts, or circuit diagrams, and representative data. Contrast with Demonstration, Inspection and Test. See the ACBM Dev. Spec. (BD&SG, 1998) §4.2.1.2.
androgynous
A characteristic of connectors in which both sides are the same; that is, no "differences of gender" can be assigned. Contrast with Non-androgynous. See also Spacecraft docking and berthing mechanism.
Assembly
Specific arrangement of two or more attached parts. When used in the context of a CBM specification, a CBM "half" (either the entire ACBM, or the entire PCBM). See the CMAN Requirements (NASA/ISSP, 2000) §B.2.
berthing
A method for structurally joining ("mating") two entities on orbit, e.g., for assembly or retrieval-for-maintenance operations. One or both of the items might be spacecraft operating under independent control authority prior to the mating event. No universally agreed-upon conceptual definition appears to exist. In the context of CBM, the definitive distinctions are found in the ACBM Dev. Spec. (BD&SG, 1998) §6.3:

a) Providing data to support positioning an ACBM (sic) and its attached element within the capture capabilities of the ACBM
b) Capture a positioned PCBM and its attached element
c) Rigidizing the interface with the captured PCBM.

See also Spacecraft docking and berthing mechanism.
catastrophic hazard
Any hazard which may cause permanent disabling or fatal personnel injury of loss of one of the following: the launch or servicing vehicle, SSMB, or major ground facility. See the ACBM Dev. Spec. (BD&SG, 1998) §6.3.
chase vehicle
In a docking maneuver, the vehicle that is approaching, usually under active maneuver control. See the usage throughout History of Space Shuttle Rendezvous (Goodman, 2011). Use of the term for the berthing process is inconsistent. In many analyses, it simply refers to the element equipped with the PCBM. Contrast with target vehicle.
Component
In the context of the Environmental Test Requirements (NASA/ISSP, 2003) §10.2: "A component is an assembly of parts that constitute a functional article viewed as an entity for purposes of analysis, manufacturing, maintenance, or record keeping; the smallest entity specified for a distributed system. Examples are hydraulic actuators, valves, batteries, electrical harnesses, individual electronic assemblies, and Orbital Replaceable Units."
Demonstration
In the formal context, verification by operation, adjustment or reconfiguration of items performing their designed functions under specific scenarios. The items may be instrumented and quantitive limits or performance monitored, but only check sheets rather than actual performance data are required to be recorded. Contrast with Analysis, Inspection and Test. See the ACBM Dev. Spec. (BD&SG, 1998) §4.2.1.3.
docking
A method for structurally joining ("mating") two entities on orbit, e.g., for assembly or retrieval-for-maintenance operations. One or both of the items might be spacecraft operating under independent control authority prior to the mating event. No universally agreed-upon conceptual definition appears to exist, but most implementations include using the relative kinetic energy of the chase vehicle to actuate latches that effect the mate. In the context of CBM, limitations on the final relative velocity eliminate docking as an acceptable means of meeting the requirements. See ACBM Dev. Spec. (BD&SG, 1998) §3.2.1.2.2 (which levies requirements on relative velocities of the PCBM with respect to the ACBM at capture) and Spacecraft docking and berthing mechanism.
EVA (Extravehicular Activity)
See Extravehicular Activity.
Execute Package
An “execute” package consists of flight plans, short-term plans, procedure updates, data needed to operate the space-shuttle and ISS systems, in-flight maintenance procedures, inventory-stowage data, software upgrades, flight notes, scripts for publicized events, and other instructions. See Whitney, Melendrez & Hadlock (2010) page 40.
flange conformance
Conformance loads are those applied to eliminate relative deflections across a joint as it is bolted. They result from the stiffness of the joint's members and supporting structure (e.g., a bulkhead). The CBM literature sometimes uses the term "compliance" as a synonym. See the definition for stiffness in the Fracture Control Requirements (NASA/SSPO 2001) page B-6 and Illi (1992) page 5 (pdf pagination).
Inspection
In the formal context, verification by visual examination of the item, or reviewing descriptive documentation, and comparing the appropriate characteristics with predetermined standards to determine conformance to requirements without the use of special laboratory equipment or procedures. Contrast with Analysis, Demonstration and Test. See the ACBM Dev. Spec. (BD&SG, 1998) §4.2.1.1.
IVA (Intravehicular Activity)
Work done without a pressurized suit inside a spacecraft that is internally pressurized to something like the atmosphere found at sea level. Often referred to as occurring in a "shirt-sleeve environment". Contrast with EVA.
module
The precise definition of this term on ISS depends on context. It is used generically for any pre-integrated unit being attached to the on-orbit ISS. When used in the CBM literature, it is a shortened version of "pressurized module", synonymous with "Pressurized Element (PE)". Many sources appear to use all of these terms interchangeably. In the context of CBM, it includes things that cannot be pressurized before berthing, but can contain pressure after berthing is complete (e.g., Cupola, Pressurized Mating Adapters).
Moving Mechanical Assembly
A mechanical or electromechanical device that controls the movement of one mechanical part of a vehicle relative to another part. See the Environmental Test Requirements (NASA/ISSP, 2003) page 10-3.
non-androgynous
A characteristic of connectors in which one side is different that the other. Such connectors are often described as "gendered". The concept is sometimes referred to as "heterogenous". Contrast with Androgynous. See also Spacecraft docking and berthing mechanism.
NRAL (NanoRacks Airlock)
NRAL is an abbreviation sometimes used in the NASA Status Reports in lieu of the element's formal nomenclature (NanoRacks Bishop Airlock).
preloaded joint
As used in the Space Station program, a preloaded joint is one in which the clamping force is sufficient to a) provide for life due to cyclic loads; b) to assure that the joint stiffness doesn't change due to flange separation; and c) to assure that pressure seals (if present) are not affected by flange separation. “Pre” is used in the sense of being present when the joint is first made, before being exposed to service loads. The clamping force is typically provided by a bolt, but can be supplied by other types of mechanical device. See the Structural Design Requirements (NASA/SSPO, 2000) page B-5.
pressure decay test
A known volume of pressurized gas permeates through and/or leaks at the interface of a seal under test while the pressure and temperature are recorded over time. Although this method is low cost and applicable to an extensive range of leak rates, it has several limitations that "reduce feasibility": see Oravec, Daniels & Mather (2017) pp 1–2.
pressure vessel
A container designed primarily for pressurized storage of gases or liquids that meets certain criteria for stored energy or pressure. See the Structural Design Requirements (NASA/SSPO, 2000).
Pressurized Element
See module.
pressurized structure
A structure designed to carry vehicle loads in which pressure is a significant contributor to the design loads. See the Structural Design Requirements (NASA/SSPO, 2000) Appendix B.
port
Not used in a consistent manner. In some sources, a combination of penetrated primary structural bulkhead (sealed with a hatch) and a CBM. In other sources, anywhere a CBM is used (with, or without, a bulkhead and hatch).
PDRS (Payload Deployment and Retrieval System)
The collection of Shuttle subsystems and components used to hold and manipulate items in the payload bay, especially items for which flight release (or mating) was planned. Elements included the Shuttle RMS, Payload Retention Latch Assemblies, Grapple Fixtures, Targets, and a CCTV system. See the Payload Bay User's Guide (NASA/NSTS, 2011).
Primary Structure
That part of a flight vehicle or element which sustains the significant applied loads and provides main load paths for distributing reactions of applied loads. Also the main structure which is required to sustain the significant applied loads, including pressure and thermal loads, and which if it fails creates a catastrophic hazard. See the ACBM Dev. Spec. (BD&SG, 1998) §6.3 and the Structural Design Requirements (NASA/SSPO, 2000) Appendix B.
Proximity Operations
Operations by one (or more) independently controlled spacecraft within 2,000 feet (610 m) of another, characterized by nearly continuous trajectory control. See the usage throughout History of Space Shuttle Rendezvous (Goodman, 2011). Contrast with rendezvous control.
Qualification
"Qualification is the process that proves the design, manufacturing, and assembly of the hardware and software complies with the design requirements when subjected to environmental conditions." Contrast with Acceptance. See the Environmental Test Requirements (NASA/ISSP, 2003) page 10-5.
Reaction Control System (RCS)
A type of Attitude Control System (ACS). RCS is distinguished by active implementation of Newton's Second Law to manage the orientation of a spacecraft without changing the orbital parameters of the center of mass. Propulsive RCS can, if so designed, also be used for Orbital Maneuvering (implementing Kepler's Laws to changing the spacecraft's orbital parameters). See Kaplan (1976) p. 2 and Chapters 3–4.
Rendezvous
Maneuvers by one spacecraft to match the orbital parameters of another. These maneuvers place the two spacecraft in such close proximity that the mathematics of “orbital mechanics” no longer dominate the ability to bring them closer still. These operations are typically executed by one independently controlled spacecraft at ranges greater than 2,000 feet (610 m) of another. They can be characterized by trajectory control maneuvers occurring at intervals of tens of minutes or greater. See the usage throughout History of Space Shuttle Rendezvous (Goodman, 2011). Contrast with proximity operations.
RMS (Remote Manipulator System)
A tele-robotic device used to maneuver payloads in the near vicinity of a spacecraft (comparable in range to the terminal operations of docking). Several examples exist: those relevant to CBM documentation are the Shuttle RMS (SRMS) and the Space Station RMS (SSRM). The two are colloquially known as "Canadarm" and Canadarm2, respectively, but the documentation almost exclusively uses the nomenclature shown here.
subassembly
With respect to some reference assembly, an assembly which is wholly contained within the reference assembly. In the context of the CBM, a mechanism for which verification activities can take place ex situ. The definition here follows the CMAN Requirements (NASA/ISSP, 2000), §B.2, but see the Environmental Test Requirements (NASA/ISSP, 2003) §10.2 for nuances of application.
Target Vehicle
In a docking maneuver, the vehicle being approached. The target vehicle is sometimes under active attitude control, but not typically under active maneuver control. See the usage throughout History of Space Shuttle Rendezvous (Goodman, 2011). The term is inconsistently found in the technical literature with regard to berthing. In many CBM analyses, the term refers to the element equipped with the ACBM. Contrast with chase vehicle.
Test
In the formal context, verification through systematic exercising of the item under all appropriate conditions. Performance is quantitatively measured either during or after the controlled application of either real or simulated functional or environmental stimuli. The analysis of data derived from a test is an integral part of the test and may involve automated data reduction to produce the necessary results. Contrast with Analysis, Demonstration and Inspection. See the ACBM Dev. Spec. (BD&SG, 1998) §4.2.1.4.
Thermal Mass
In thermal analysis, a synonym of “capacitance”, which is analogous to its usage in electrical network analysis. A system with substantial thermal mass resists rapid changes in temperature. Large thermal masses can be achieved either by literal large mass, or by a large heat storage capacity of a material (e.g., one that changes phase at near-constant temperature). See Gilmore (1994) page 5-24.

== See also ==
- Comparison of spacecraft docking and berthing mechanisms
