= Japan Manned Space Systems Corporation =

Private spaceflight company

JAMSS
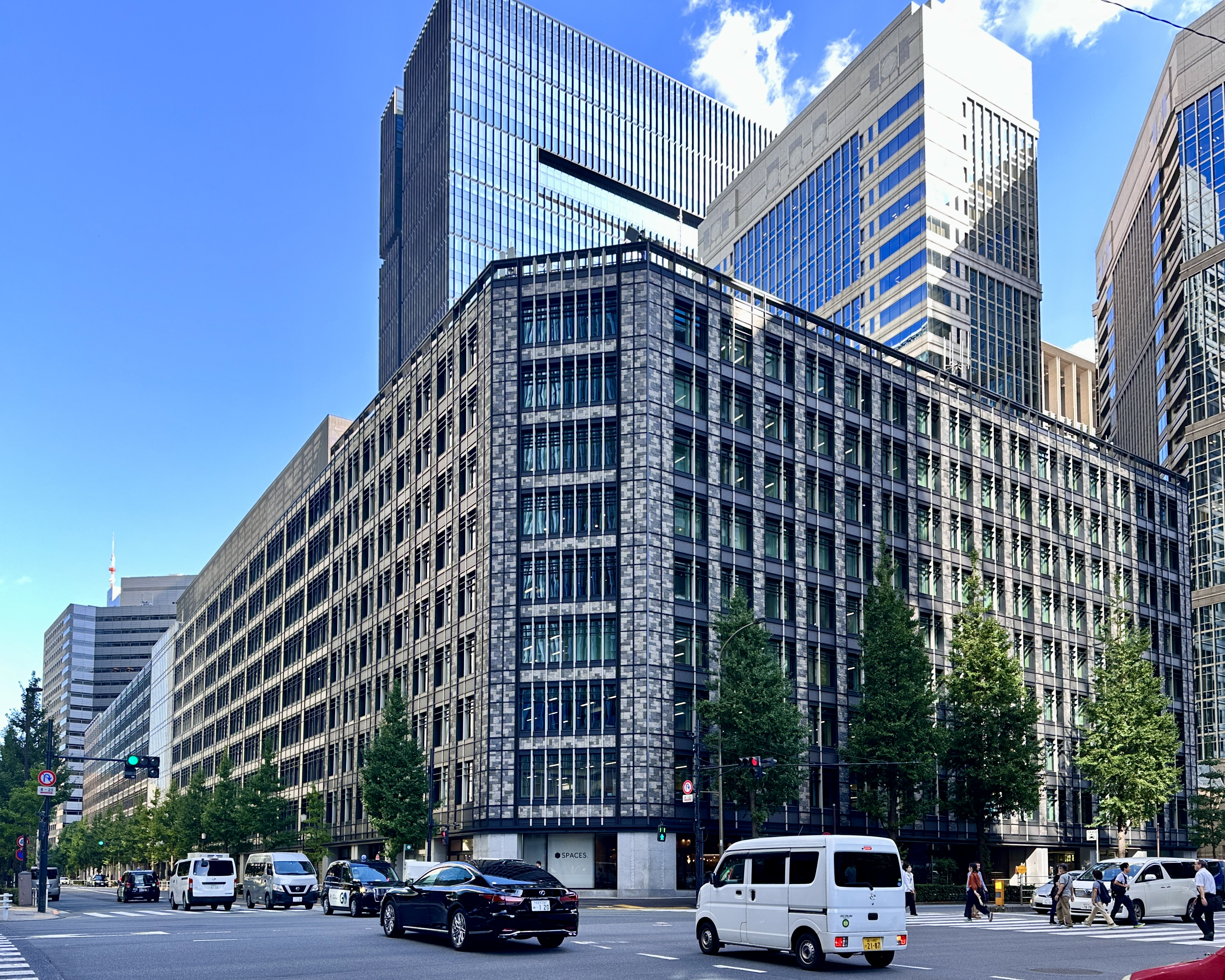
- Headquarters in Chiyoda, Tokyo (Otemachi Building)
- Type: Private
- Industry: aerospace
- Founded: 14 May 1990
- Fate: Active
- Headquarters: Chiyoda, Tokyo, Japan
- Products: space experiment services, human resource training
- Website: www.jamss.co.jp

Japan Manned Space Systems Corporation (JAMSS) is a private company that provides training to astronauts and coordinates space experiments conducted at the International Space Station (ISS). The company assists the Japan Aerospace Exploration Agency (JAXA) in the operation of Japan's ISS Kibō module and the H-II Transfer Vehicle, and provides quality assurance for items heading to space through analysis of materials, parts, and software. JAMSS also provides opportunities for commercial use of space stations such as the Kirara service for the ISS. From 2023, JAMSS has been assisting Toyota in the development of the Lunar Cruiser crewed rover.

Employees of JAMSS include astronaut training instructors that provide ground training for astronauts conducting experiments at the Kibō module, and flight directors at the Kibō module Mission Control Room in JAXA's Tsukuba Space Center.

== History ==
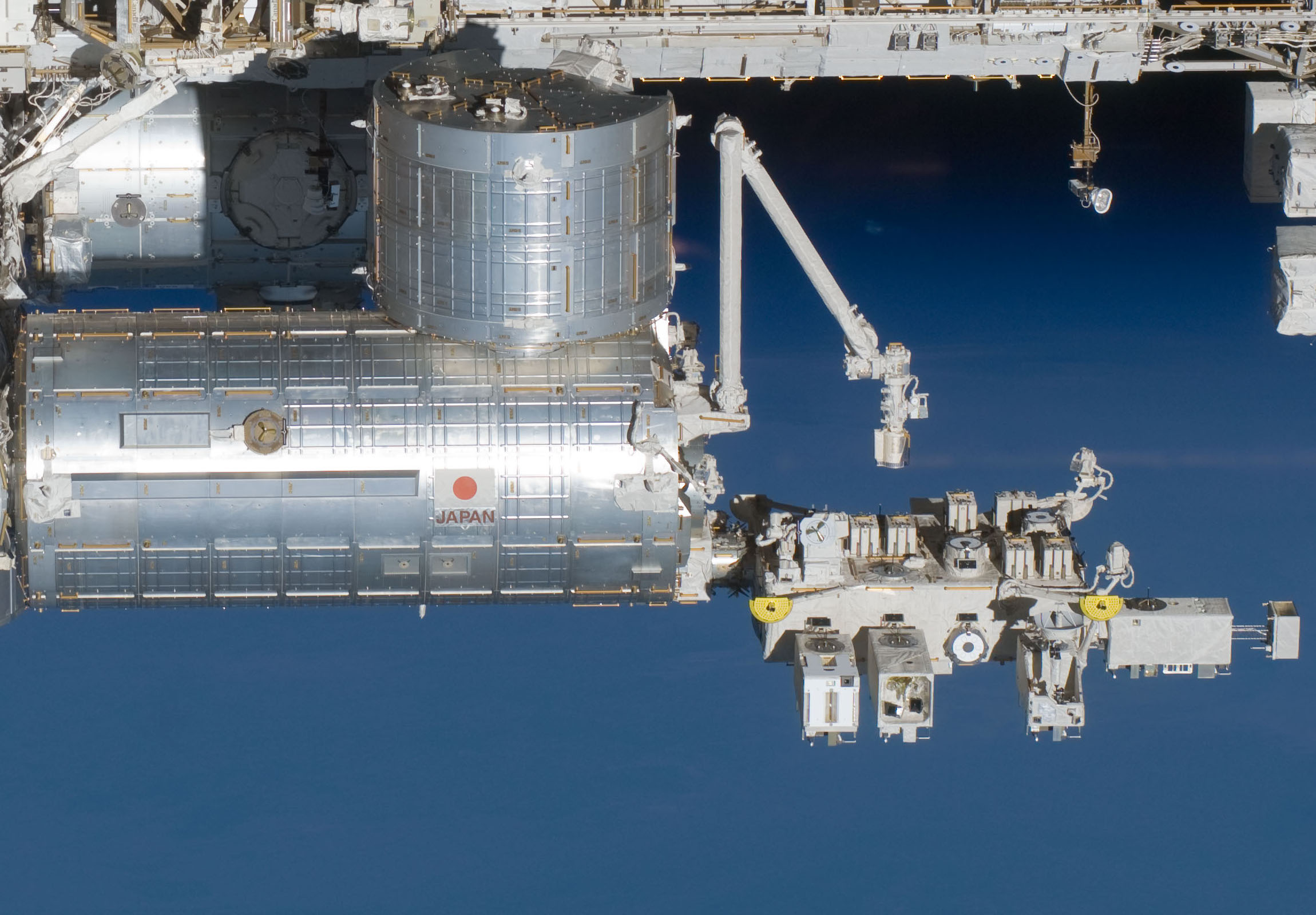
The Japanese Experiment Module 'Kibō'

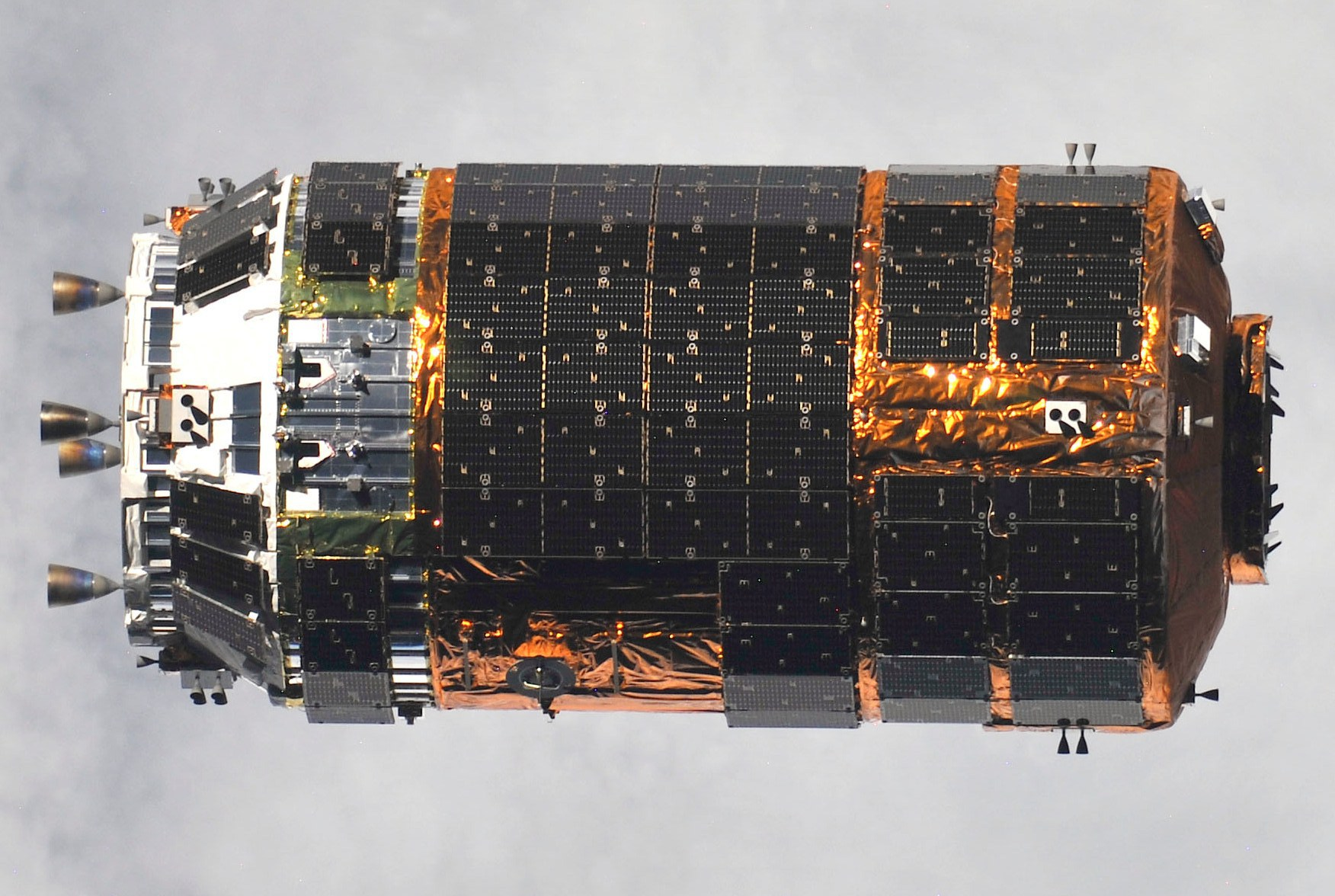
The H-II Transfer Vehicle

In 1985, Japan finalized its decision to participate in the International Space Station program. While Japan's main space agency at the time, the National Space Development Agency of Japan (NASDA, now part of JAXA) had experience with launch vehicles and civilian application satellites, it lacked both the technical expertise and human resources for human spaceflight. JAMSS was founded in May 1990 as a private company to assist NASDA in the development and operation of the ISS's Japanese Experiment Module. Initial funding was provided from the private sector.

In 2005, JAMSS announced plans to jointly conduct experiments in space with space tourist Daisuke Enomoto.

In 2007, JAMSS signed a Memorandum of Understanding (MoU) with Rocketplane Kistler to develop commercial launch support for Japanese users of the ISS.

In 2009, JAMSS America, Inc. assisted Orbital Sciences Corporation (now part of Northrop Grumman) procure the proximity link system for the Cygnus cargo spacecraft from Japan's Mitsubishi Electric. The proximity link system will be used by Cygnus to communicate with the ISS.

On 30 September 2014, the Center for the Advancement of Science in Space awarded a research grant to JAMSS America, Inc. to use the ISS for the Global AIS on Space Station (GLASS) project.

In 2015, two satellites from Brazil that JAMSS was contracted to deploy were released into space from the ISS. The National Institute for Space Research (INPE) and Instituto Tecnológico de Aeronáutica's AESP-14 was deployed on 5 February 2015, and University of Brasília's SERPENS was deployed on 17 September 2015.

In November 2015, JAMSS America, Inc. signed a MoU with UK's Satellite Applications Catapult for cooperation in the commercialization of space.

In 2016, JAMSS's project to utilize information and communications technology such as satellite remote sensing for the cultivation of rice in Funagata, Yamagata was selected by the Ministry of Agriculture, Forestry and Fisheries as a pilot project of advanced agriculture through the partnership of agricultural and business sectors.

In 2017, JAMSS signed a MoU with Axiom Space for cooperation on the utilization of the Axiom Station.

In December 2018, JAMSS contracted Belgium's Space Applications Services (SpaceApps) to host JAMSS's Kirara unit on SpaceApp's ICE Cubes Facility.

In July 2022, JAMSS was selected by Ehime Prefecture to accelerate the use of digital technology in rice cultivation.

In September 2023, JAMSS was selected by the Japan Agency for Marine-Earth Science and Technology (JAMSTEC) to provide support for conducting exposure experiments on the ISS's exterior. JAMSS will utilize Aegis Aerospace's Materials International Space Station Experiment (MISSE) platform to conduct experiments for JAMSTEC.

In July 2024, JAMSS signed a Letter Of Support with Amazon Web Services (AWS) for the utilization of cloud services in low Earth orbit.

In October 2024, JAMSS and Science Co., Ltd. announced that they will conduct joint research for the realization of showers in space. The two companies aim to conduct demonstration tests of the space shower at the ISS. A mockup of the system was exhibited at the Expo 2025.

On 24 March 2025, JAMSS signed an agreement with Vast, becoming Asia's first payload partner for Vast's Haven-1 commercial space station. JAMSS's KLABOX will be placed inside Haven-1.

== Products ==
Products by JAMSS include Multi Protocol Converters (MPC), Cargo Transfer Bags (CTB), and Trash Bags used in the Kibō module. The MPC are converters that first receive video data and data from Ethernet, and then convert them into a format compatible to ISS's communication system. Along with the Kibō module, JAMSS's MPC are used in the US Orbital Segment and Europe's Columbus module. The CTB, also known as Soft Bags are standardized bags used to store supplies being sent to the ISS on the H-II Transfer Vehicle and HTV-X, and also functions as cushions to protect the cargo from vibrations during launch. The Trash Bags are used to collect disused items from the Kibō module. The Trash Bags are disposed by placing them inside cargo spacecraft that will burn up in the atmosphere upon their end of mission.

== Astronaut training ==
JAMSS has provided training to JAXA astronauts from before the launch of the Kibō module. For the 2023 JAXA astronaut group, JAMSS assisted JAXA in selecting astronaut candidates, and from April 2023 JAMSS has trained the 2023 JAXA astronaut group members Makoto Suwa and Ayu Yoneda.

JAMSS provides ground training to astronauts of all nationalities who are assigned to conduct experiments at the Kibō module. Astronauts from the United States, Russia, Europe and Canada receive training for the Kibō module at the Tsukuba Space Center located in Japan.

In 2020, JAMSS was selected by JAXA to conduct health management operations for Japanese astronauts staying at the ISS.

== JAFDIS ==
JAMSS Automated File Dump Innovation System Technical Demonstration (JAFDIS) is a file downlink system on the ISS developed by JAMSS. JAFDIS autonomously downlinks files from the ISS to the ground at the pre-scheduled time. The system uses a Amazon Web Services (AWS) Snowcone located inside the ISS. From 19 to 21 April 2023, JAFDIS was demonstrated at the ISS with the collaboration of Axiom Space and AWS.

JAMSS signed a Letter Of Support with AWS in July 2024.

== Kirara ==
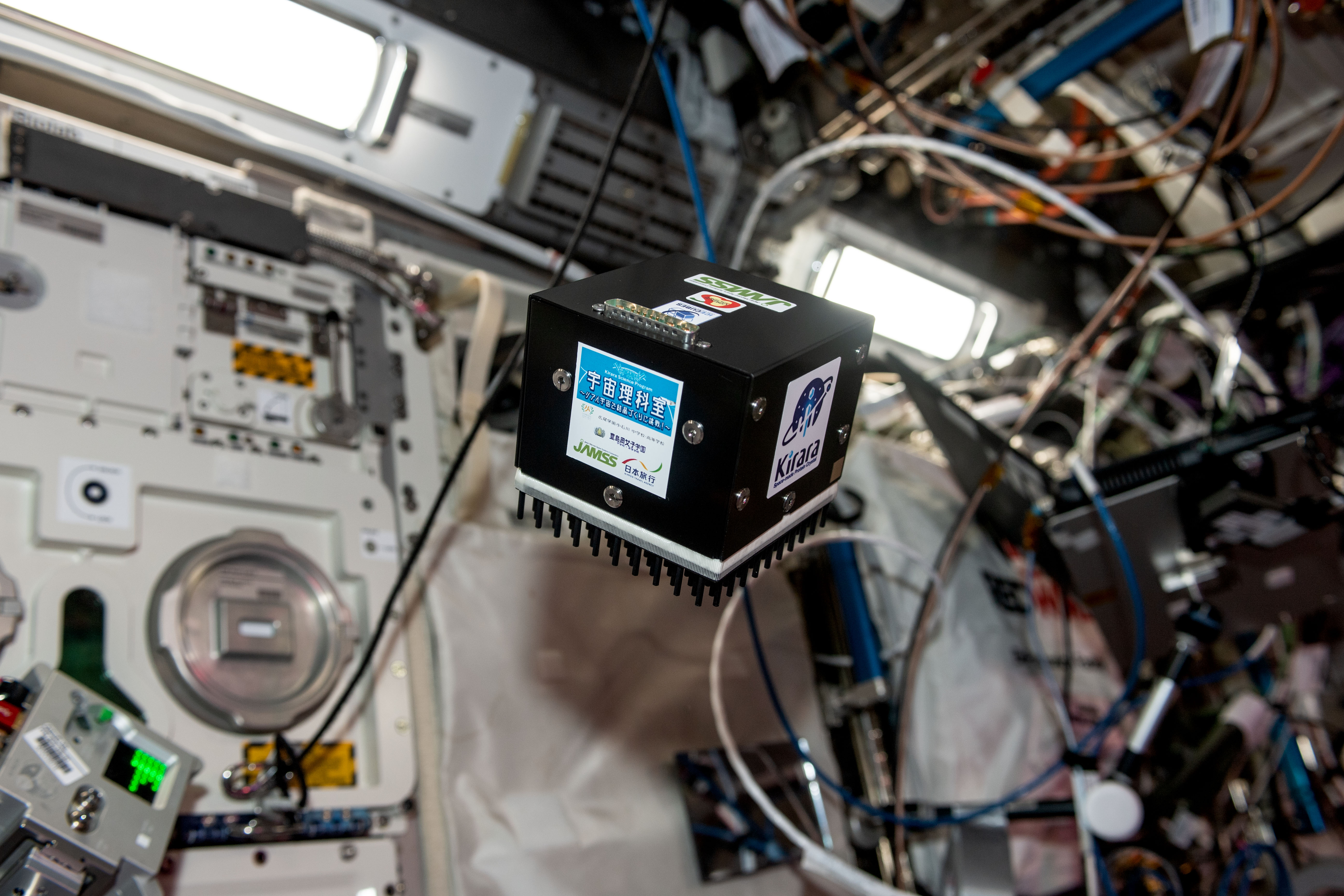
Kirara-4 inside the ISS

Kirara is a service by JAMSS to bring items such as experiment samples to the ISS and then have the items returned to Earth. Kirara is primarily used to conduct protein crystallization experiments in space, but has also been used for educational purposes and promotion. Partners in the Kirara service includes Confocal Science Inc. and Space Applications Services (SpaceApps). Each unit of Kirara is a 10 cm size cubic box with a incubator inside, and on the ISS they are attached to SpaceApps's ICE Cubes Facility located in the Columbus module. Once back on Earth, an optional X-ray diffraction measurement is conducted for protein crystal samples.

The first Kirara was launched in December 2019, and included an experiment from the University of Tokyo that synthesized cellulose enzymatically for the first time in space. In Kirara-2, which was launched to space in December 2020, Hungary's InnoStudio Inc. conducted experiments using Remdesivir. According to JAMSS, this was the first time an experiment for COVID-19 drug research was conducted in space.

=== List of Kirara missions ===
List of Kirara missions
Mission	Customers	Transport	Launch Date	Return Date	Notes
Kirara-1	Takeda Pharmaceutical Company, Interprotein Corporation, SOSHO, Inc., University of Tokyo, InnoStudio Inc., IXTAL S.r.l.s., CMAC, Institute of Crystallography	SpaceX CRS-19	5 December 2019	7 January 2020	Was conducted free of charge as a trial.; The first ever cellulose synthesis by enzyme in space.
Kirara-2	University of Tokyo, InnoStudio Inc.	SpaceX CRS-21	6 December 2020	14 January 2021	Included samples of remdesivir-SBECD, becoming the first ever space experiment for COVID-19 drug research.
Kirara-3	University of Tokyo, InnoStudio Inc., Nikkei, Inc.	SpaceX CRS-24	21 December 2021	24 January 2022	Starting from this mission, Kirara became available for educational, promotional and memorial purposes as well.; Included protein crystallization experiments from students of Yanagawa High School in Japan.
Kirara-4	University of Tokyo, Hokkaido University, Kyoto University, Confocal Science Inc., Chem-Station, Nagoya City University, InnoStudio Inc., ICE Cubes Service	SpaceX CRS-27	15 March 2023	15 April 2023	
Kirara-5	University of Tokyo, Hokkaido University, Confocal Science Inc., Korea Basic Science Institute, Nihon University, Tokushima University, Nagoya City University, Chem-Station, Nippon Travel Agency Co., Ltd., TOKYO OHKA KOGYO CO., LTD., National Central University	SpaceX CRS-29	10 November 2023	22 December 2023	
Kirara-6	Tanaka Industry, HUN-REN Research Centre for Natural Sciences, Nippon Travel Agency Co., Ltd.	SpaceX CRS-32	21 April 2025	25 May 2025	An SD card storing the data of two songs including the Himnusz was contained.

== KLABOX ==
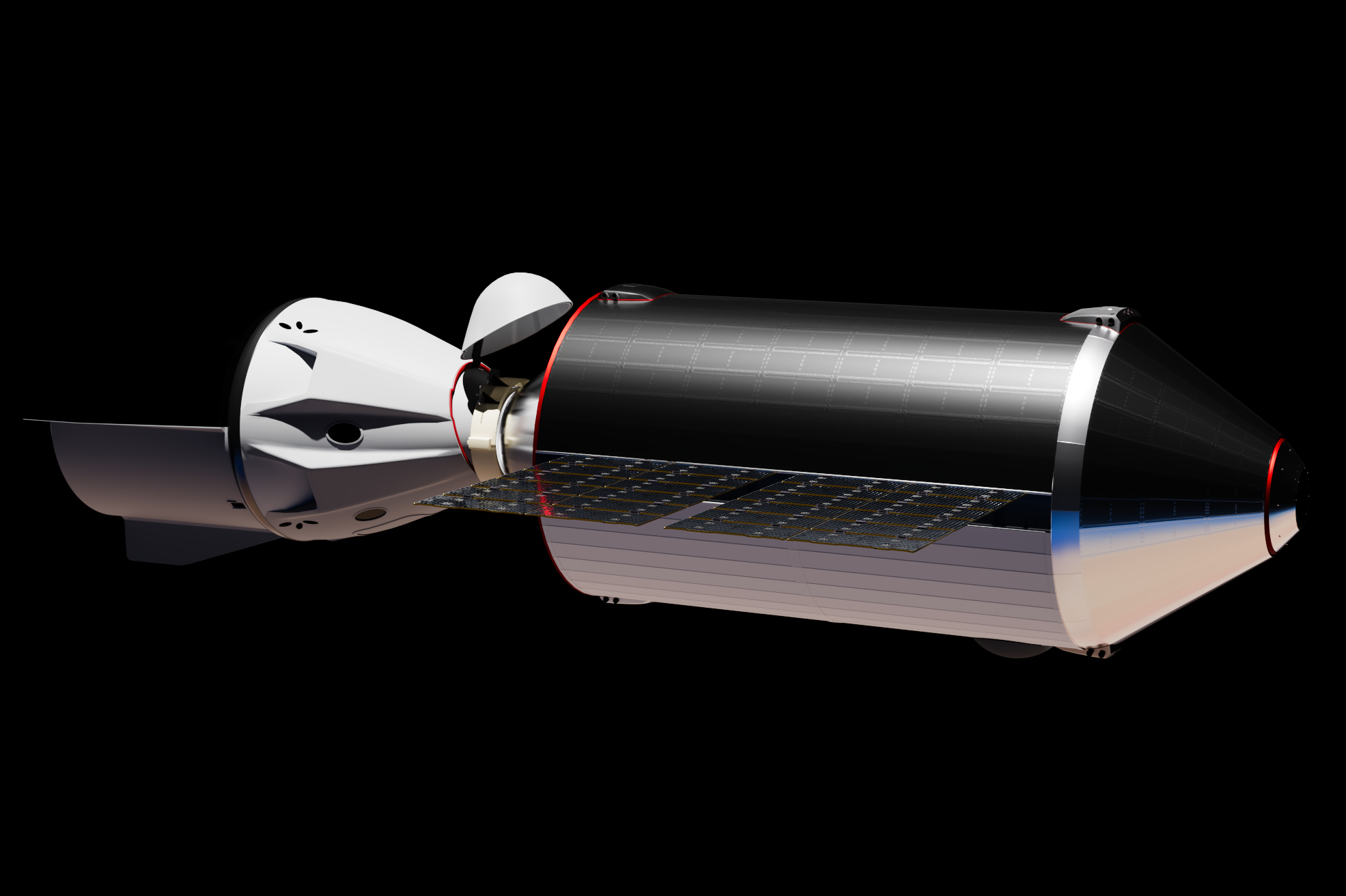
A SpaceX Dragon 2 docked to Haven-1. KLABOX will be placed inside Haven-1.

KLABOX is a multi-purpose payload locker for microgravity research that will be carried on Vast's Haven-1 commercial space station. The locker provides electricity and communication and has modular compartments that are 10 cm×10 cm×10 cm in size with a maximum capacity of 12 units. KLABOX can accommodate both promotional items and space experiments and can be used for a variety of purposes such as research in the microgravity environment, education, and entertainment. KLABOX will be installed in Haven-1's middeck locker. KLABOX's control board will be jointly developed by JAMSS and Tokyo University of Science Research Center for Space System Innovation.

== Remo Farm ==
Remo Farm is an application developed by JAMSS that visualize data from agricultural field, and can be remotely accessed from smartphones. The application combines weather and geographic data with observational data from Earth observation satellites to assess the growth of crops. For example, Remo Farm visualizes normalized difference vegetation index (NDVI), a metric that quantifies the health of plants, for a givin area. Farmers can use this data to understand any unevenness in the crop's growth. Remo Farm uses satellite images acquired by Landsat and Sentinel-2. Users can add notes and store photographs in the application as time stamps. Remo Farm allows farmers to make decisions based on quantitive data rather than instincts, and the data accumulated through Remo Farm can be used to train new farmers.

Remo Farm was developed through a pilot project of JAMSS selected by the Ministry of Agriculture, Forestry and Fisheries in 2016, and was tested in Funagata, Yamagata to cultivate brands of rice such as Tsuyahime and Haenuki. In Funagata, after using Remo Farm for three years crop yield increased by 11% while the cost decreased by 15%. The product version of Remo Farm was initially released in June 2022.

In July 2022, JAMSS's Remo Farm was selected by Ehime Prefecture's TRY ANGLE EHIME initiative, which aims to foster the growth of digital technology to solve local issues. JAMSS provided Remo Farm to assist farmers cultivating Himeno Rin, a brand of rice developed by Ehime Prefecture.

== Past projects ==
=== GLASS ===
Global AIS on Space Station (GLASS) was a project by JAMSS America, Inc. to use the ISS as a platform to receive automatic identification system (AIS) signals used by maritime traffic on Earth, from space. While the curvature of Earth blocks the AIS signals at Earth, GLASS was to acquire and rebroadcast AIS signals, thus extending the signal's range. JAMSS America, Inc. was the principal investigator of GLASS, and the team included the University of Hawaii, the Greater Houston Port Bureau, Mare Liberum Consulting, L.P., Flexitech, LLC, VPI Engineering, and FlexRadio Systems. Development of GLASS began from September 2014, and was funded by a grant from the Center for the Advancement of Science in Space (CASIS). Flexitech Aerospace provided technical consultation and manufactured the RF filter and amplifier subsystem, and Flexitech, LLC manufactured the RF distribution system.

On 18 July 2016, hardware for GLASS was sent to the ISS on board the SpaceX CRS-9 mission, and on 28 July 2016 the Maritime Awareness Radio drawer was installed on Express Rack 3 located at the Columbus module.

After 2017, the commercialization of GLASS was passed on to Adcole Maryland Aerospace, LLC. Adcole Maryland Aerospace, LLC. was acquired by AE Industrial Partners in March 2020 and was subsequently renamed Adcole Space, LLC. GLASS was operated until 2022.

=== GRASP ===
Global Receive Antenna and Signal Processor (GRASP) was a facility for collecting terrestrial radio frequency signals for purposes such as tracking ships, studying animal migrations, and monitoring the environment, that was being developed by JAMSS America, Inc. On 17 November 2016 CASIS announced it had awarded a research agreement to the GRASP project. GRASP was proposed to be placed at the ISS. According to CASIS, as of October 2017 GRASP was planned to be sent to space in early 2018.

=== Pullsora ===
Pullsora was an exercise equipment for physical therapy developed by JAMSS that was launched in 2019. Pullsora was compact and lightweight, and was designed for people with low muscle strength. The tension of the device could be adjusted by a dial. According to JAMSS, Pullsora was developed from the idea that the weightless environment in space has many similarities to being bedridden. The company advertised Pullsora as being "invented by astronaut trainers".

Pullsora was discontinued in December 2024.

== See also ==
- DigitalBlast
- ICE Cubes Service
- ISS National Lab
- Mitsubishi Corporation
- Nanoracks
- Redwire
