= LightCube =

Student satellite

- Mission type: Amateur Radio
- Operator: Arizona State University
- COSPAR ID: 1998-067VF

Spacecraft properties
- Spacecraft type: Satellite
- Manufacturer: ASU Interplanetary Lab

Start of mission
- Launch date: 15 March 2023, 00:30 UTC
- Rocket: Falcon 9 SpaceX CRS-27
- Launch site: Kennedy Space Center, LC-39A
- Contractor: SpaceX

End of mission
- Last contact: November 17, 2023

Orbital parameters
- Reference system: Geocentric
- Regime: VLEO
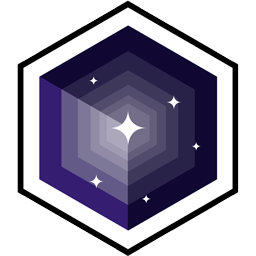
- Mission patch

LightCube was a 1U CubeSat developed by Arizona State University that was launched to the International Space Station on board the SpaceX CRS-27 mission.

== Background ==
Lightcube was selected as a payload for NASA's CubeSat Launch Initiative as part of their 12th round of candidates alongside PowerSat from Cal Poly State University, SPRITE, AEPEX, and CANVAS from University of Colorado, Boulder, Big Red Sat-1 from the University of Nebraska–Lincoln, RHOK-SAT from Rhodes College, Foras Promineo from the Perkins Local School District, Dione from NASA Goddard Space Flight Center, STEP-1, AERO, and VISTA from MIT, PVDX from Brown University, and SilverSat from a private vendor.

LightCube's primary payload was 2 xenon flashtubes that amateur radio operators could activate to create a spot of light that was visible from the ground, similar in brightness to the ISS itself. In order to achieve this LightCube had an onboard gravity gradient boom to orient itself to face earth. The satellite was developed by ASU in collaboration with Vega Space Systems and the Centro de Enseñanza Técnica y Superior (CETYS) in Baja California. CETYS developed the UHF antenna and was also used as a capstone project by students at both universities.

The design team conducted an in-depth assessment to confirm that the brief flashes generated will not have a significant impact on astronomy. The satellite was also made to ensure its radio receivers and transmitters where in compliance with the International Amateur Radio Union and to also coordinate a 437.175 MHz downlink.

== Mission ==
LightCube would be launched to the ISS as a secondary payload onboard the SpaceX CRS-27 mission. LightCube suffered a communications failure just under 24 hours after being deployed as the team left the battery's heater in a test mode before launch resulting in the batteries freezing. LightCube would remain in orbit until it decayed into Earth's atmosphere some time after November 17, 2023.

== See also ==
- ASUSat-1
- Coconut
