= Coconut (satellite) =

Student radio satellite

- Mission type: Amateur Radio
- Operator: Arizona State University Sun Devil Satellite Laboratory
- Website: HAM Link Information
- Mission duration: 1 year

Spacecraft properties
- Spacecraft type: Satellite
- Manufacturer: Sun Devil Satellite Laboratory

Start of mission
- Launch date: April 11, 2026, 11:41:21 UTC (7:41:21 am EDT)
- Rocket: Falcon 9 Cygnus NG-24
- Launch site: Cape Canaveral, SLC‑40
- Contractor: SpaceX

Orbital parameters
- Reference system: Geocentric
- Regime: VLEO
- Mission patch

Coconut is a 1U CubeSat developed by the Arizona State University Sun Devil Satellite Laboratory (SDSL) that was launched into low Earth orbit by the International Space Station, having been transported there on the Cygnus NG-24.

== Background ==
On March 30, 2023, NASA announced that it had selected 8 proposals for the 14th selection in the CubeSat Launch Initiative that was opened on August 8, 2022. The selected satellites where; DARLA from Saint Louis University, CAPE-4 from University of Louisiana Lafayette, HUCSat from Harvard University, SCOPE-1 from University of Texas at Austin, CUbesat-1 from Columbia University, THIS-SAT from Northeastern University, VIA-SEEs from University of Hawaii at Manoa, and Coconut. Coconut, as with each of these cubesats, would be developed by students to demonstrate technologies such as satellite to satellite laser communication and autonomous movement for NASA.

Coconut's primary mission was to provide digipeater services for amateur radios using LoRa modules. Coconut was developed in coordination with the International Amateur Radio Union (IARU) who in turn made the Coconut available for all IARU members to use to bounce signals during its mission lifespan. This was the fourth satellite developed by SDSL.

== Mission ==
Coconut would be launched on the Cygnus NG-24 resupply mission to the ISS on April 11, 2026, 11:41:21 UTC. Coconut would then be deployed from the ISS on April 15.

== See also ==
- ASUSat-1
- LightCube
