= MAGPIE (rover) =

European lunar rover

- Mission type: Lunar rover
- Operator: ESA

Spacecraft properties
- Manufacturer: ispace Europe SA

Start of mission
- Launch date: 2029 (planned)

MAGPIE (Mission for Advanced Geophysics and Polar Ice Exploration) is a lunar rover under development by ispace for the European Space Agency (ESA). It will be the first lunar rover mission by ESA. The launch of MAGPIE is planned for 2029 on ispace Mission 4. Its primary mission is to search for water ice in the lunar south pole region.

== History ==
In December 2025, MAGPIE was among eight proposals selected for small Lunar missions (announced in 2023) within the ESA's Terrae Novae programme. Unlike the other proposals (e.g. the Danish Lunar mapping satellite Máni) which received €150,000 each to mature their mission concepts, MAGPIE was selected for a direct implementation path. In July 2026, ESA awarded a €65 million contract to ispace Europe to develop MAGPIE and to deliver it to lunar surface in 2029. On 2 September 2026, the mission's implementation phase begun with a signing ceremony in Copenhagen.

== See also ==
- List of European Space Agency programmes and missions
- LUVMI – European lunar rover
