= HUCSat =

Student technology demonstration satellite

Harvard Undergraduate CubeSat
- Mission type: Technology demonstration
- Operator: Harvard University

Spacecraft properties
- Spacecraft type: Satellite
- Manufacturer: Harvard Satellite Team

Start of mission
- Launch date: April 11, 2026, 11:41:21 UTC (7:41:21 am EDT)
- Rocket: Falcon 9 Cygnus NG-24
- Launch site: Cape Canaveral, SLC‑40
- Contractor: SpaceX, Nanoracks

Orbital parameters
- Reference system: Geocentric
- Regime: VLEO

HUCSat or the Harvard Undergraduate CubeSat is a 2U Cubesat developed by undergraduate students at Harvard University and deployed to low Earth orbit from the International Space Station. The project was led by Chief Engineer Christopher Prainito and Project Manager Milligan Grinstead.

== Background ==
On March 30, 2023, NASA announced that it had selected 8 proposals for the 14th selection in the CubeSat Launch Initiative that was opened on August 8, 2022. The selected satellites were: DARLA from Saint Louis University, CAPE-4 from University of Louisiana Lafayette, Coconut from Arizona State University, SCOPE-1 from University of Texas at Austin, CUbesat-1 from Columbia University, THIS-SAT from Northeastern University, VIA-SEEs from University of Hawaii at Manoa, and HUCSat.

HUCSat's primary mission is to test the utility and viability of shape-memory alloys in its onboard instruments to demonstrate if the technology can reduce overall satellite manufacturing costs. Namely the CubeSat's solar panels will have a Nickel Titanium alloy, which will twist the panel in the direction of the sun when the sun heats it. HUCSat's secondary mission is to test a new standardized ultra-low-power LoRa module that the team hopes will make CubeSats as a whole cheaper. The satellite was developed by the Harvard Satellite Team, founded in 2018 as a subdivision of the school's chapter of Students for the Exploration and Development of Space alongside the Harvard Rocket Propulsion Group, which has been developing their own thruster system. Work on the satellite started in 2018 and was done entirely by Harvard undergraduate students. The team also worked in collaboration with the International Amateur Radio Union to coordinate uplink and downlink frequencies.

== Mission ==
HUCSat was launched on the Cygnus NG-24 resupply mission to the ISS on April 11, 2026 at 11:41:21 UTC. HUCSat was then deployed from the ISS on July 2, 2026 at 09:00:00 UTC.
