= Cygnus NG-24 =

2026 cargo mission to the ISS

NG-24
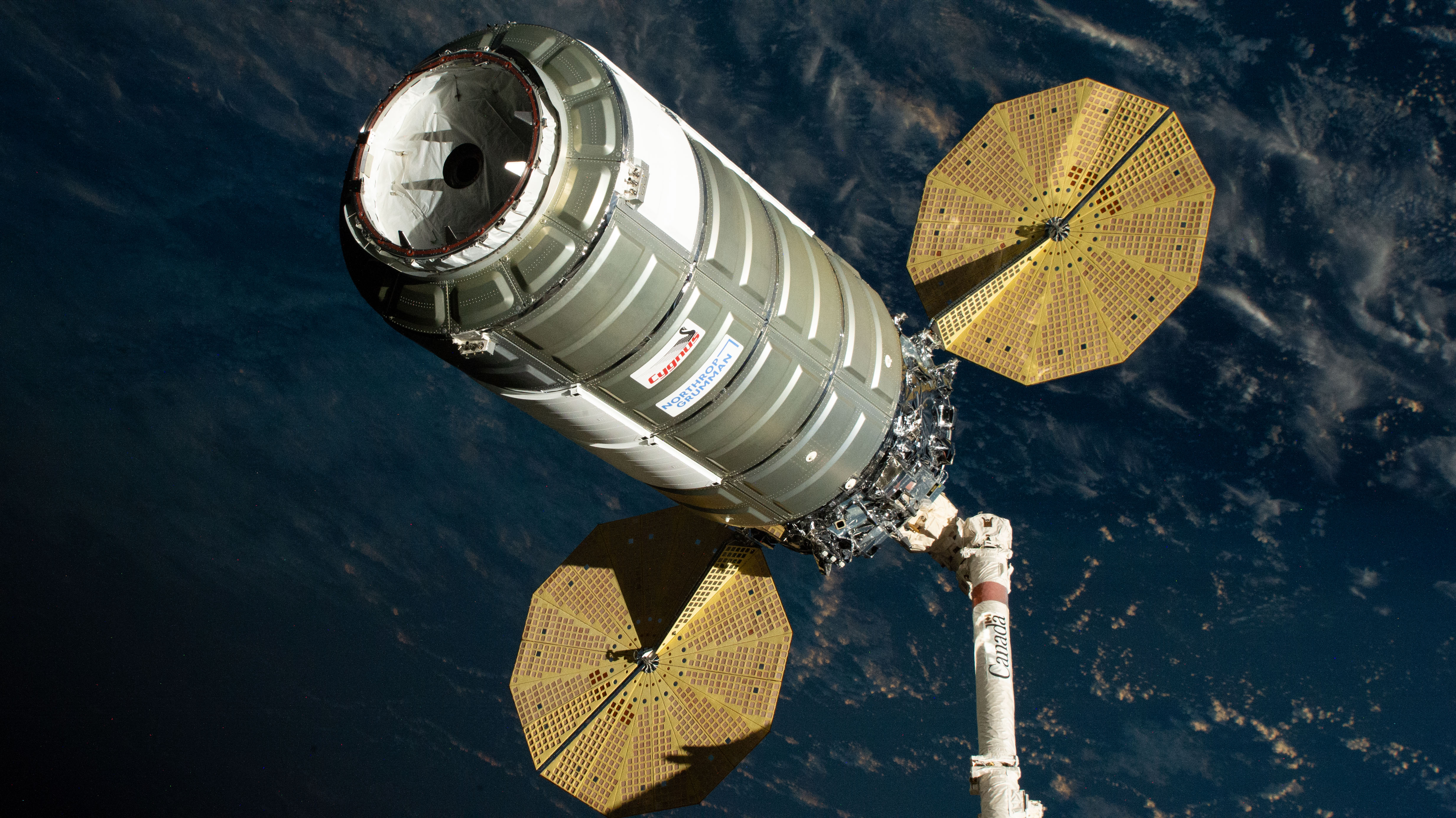
- The NG‑24 spacecraft spacecraft is held in the grips of the Canadarm2
- Names: CRS NG-24
- Mission type: ISS resupply
- Operator: Northrop Grumman
- COSPAR ID: 2026-079A
- SATCAT no.: 68689
- Mission duration: 183 days, 12 hours and 18 minutes

Spacecraft properties
- Spacecraft: S.S. Steven R. Nagel
- Spacecraft type: Cygnus XL
- Manufacturer: Northrop Grumman; Thales Alenia Space

Start of mission
- Launch date: April 11, 2026, 11:41:21 UTC (7:41:21 am EDT)
- Rocket: Falcon 9 Block 5 (B1094‑7)
- Launch site: Cape Canaveral, SLC‑40
- Contractor: SpaceX

End of mission
- Disposal: Deorbited
- Decay date: October 12, 2026

Orbital parameters
- Reference system: Geocentric orbit
- Regime: Low Earth orbit
- Inclination: 51.66°

Berthing at ISS
- Berthing port: Unity nadir
- RMS capture: April 13, 2026, 17:20 UTC
- Berthing date: April 13, 2026, 20:00 UTC
- Unberthing date: October 9, 2026
- RMS release: October 9, 2026, 16:44 UTC
- Time berthed: 178 days and 4 hours

Cargo
- Mass: 5,000 kg (11,020 lb)
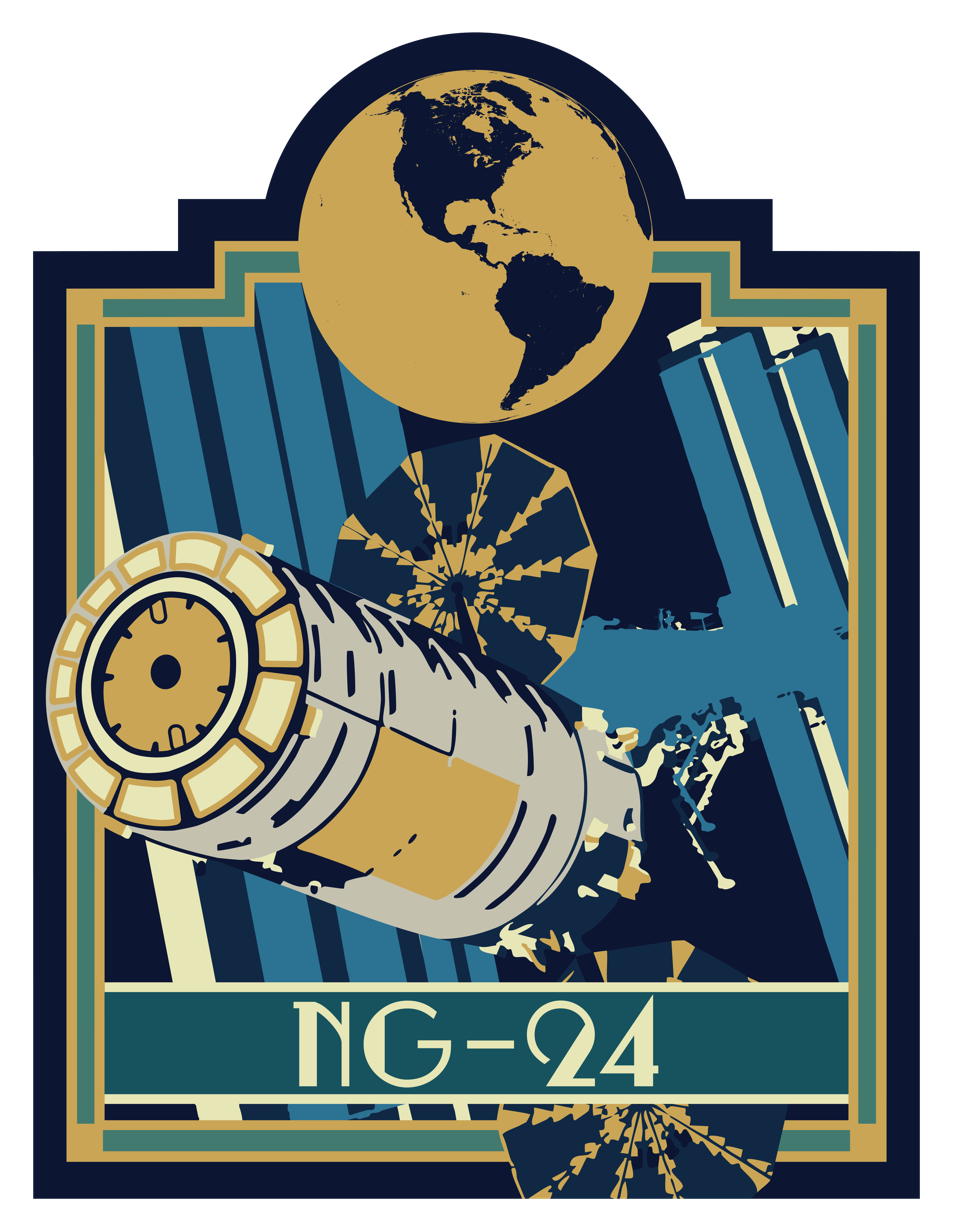
- Mission patch Commercial Resupply Services Cygnus flights

NG-24 was a cargo resupply mission to the International Space Station (ISS) under NASA's Commercial Resupply Services (CRS) contract. Operated by Northrop Grumman and flying aboard a Falcon 9 Block 5 rocket, the mission launched on April 11, 2026, at 11:41 UTC from Cape Canaveral Space Launch Complex 40.

The spacecraft was named the S.S. Steven R. Nagel. Following NG-23, the mission is the second to use the Cygnus XL spacecraft configuration, featuring a pressurized cargo module measuring 7.89 meters (25.9 ft) in length, with a payload capacity of 5,000 kilograms (11,000 lb) and a pressurized cargo volume of 36 cubic metres (1,300 cu ft).

It was the fourth Cygnus launch on a Falcon 9, arranged after Northrop Grumman's Antares 230+ was retired in 2023 due to supply chain disruptions stemming from the Russian invasion of Ukraine.

== Background ==
The Cygnus cargo spacecraft was developed by Orbital Sciences Corporation with partial funding from NASA's Commercial Orbital Transportation Services (COTS) program. It pairs a pressurized cargo module built by Thales Alenia Space—derived from the Multi-Purpose Logistics Module used on the Space Shuttle—with a service module based on Orbital's GEOStar satellite bus.

The first Standard Cygnus flew in 2013, followed by the larger Enhanced Cygnus in 2015. Orbital Sciences became Orbital ATK in 2015 and was acquired by Northrop Grumman in 2018. Since then, Northrop Grumman has continued CRS operations. NG-24 is the twelfth Cygnus mission under the CRS-2 contract.

== Manifest ==
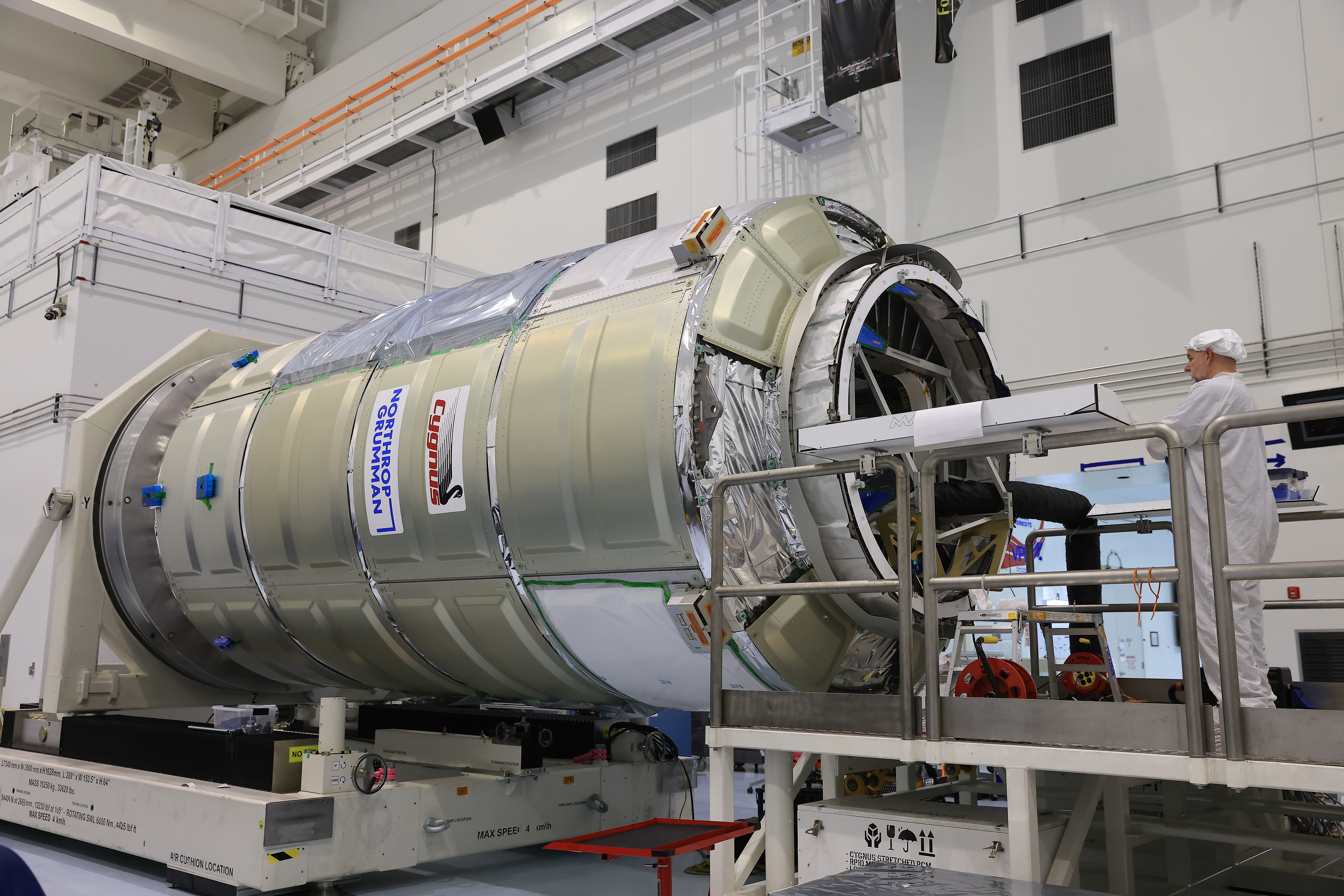
Technicians conduct prelaunch operations on the cargo module of the NG‑24 spacecraft

The Cygnus spacecraft was loaded with a total of 5,000 kilograms (11,020 lb) of cargo and supplies before its launch.

The cargo manifest is broken down as follows:

- Crew supplies: 1,410 kg (3,108 lb)
- Science investigations: 1,075 kg (2,369 lb)
- Spacewalk equipment: 65 kg (143 lb)
- Vehicle hardware: 2,120 kg (4,673 lb)
- Computer resources: 330 kg (727 lb)

NASA highlighted several research projects being delivered to the ISS on this mission. These included a new module for the Cold Atom Laboratory, hardware and model organisms for biological research, and a radio receiver for observing the ionosphere.

The mission included bringing ClimCam (Climate Camera) to the ISS, attached to the Bartolomeo platform of the Columbus External Payload Facility. Developed by the Kenya Space Agency, the Egyptian Space Agency, and the Uganda national space program, the ClimCam Payload will be used for climate and weather observation in East Africa.

NG-24 also carried 6 CubeSats developed as part of NASA's CubeSat Launch Initiative including; Coconut (ASU), HUCSat (Harvard), LEOPARDSat-1 (Cincinnati), and three satellites for the Pleiades Rapid Orbital Verification Experiment System (PROVES).

== Mission ==
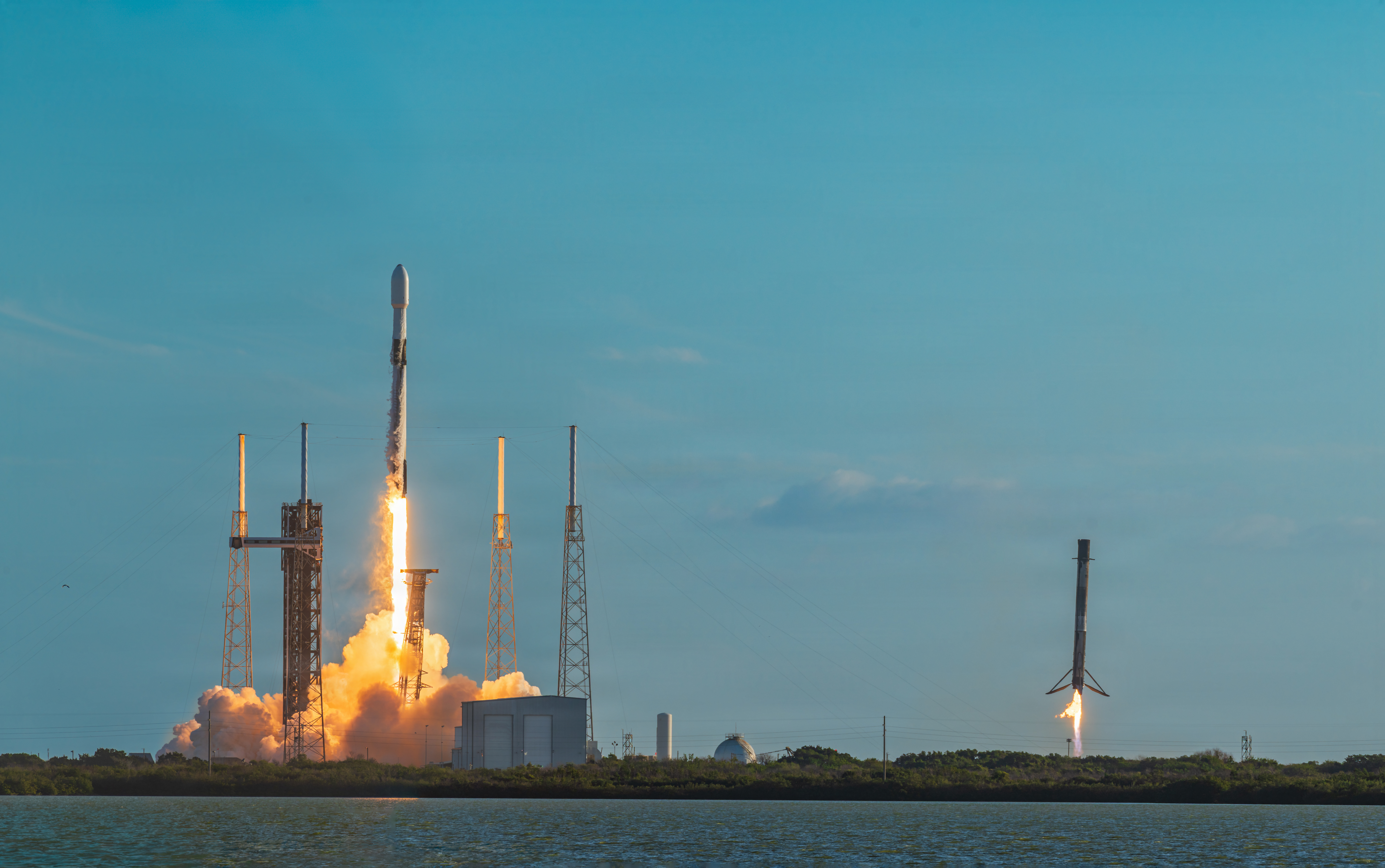
Composite image of NG-24 launch from SLC-40 and subsequent booster landing at LZ-40, capturing both events 8 minutes apart

The Pressurized Cargo Module (PCM) was manufactured by Thales Alenia Space in Turin, Italy, and assembly of the service module for the NG-24 spacecraft took place at Northrop Grumman's facility in Dulles, Virginia. Thales Alenia Space shared that the PCM had left their clean room bound for the Kennedy Space Center on January 30, 2026. The spacecraft was launched on April 11, 2026, at 11:41 UTC.

== See also ==
- Uncrewed spaceflights to the International Space Station
- Fluorescent Deep Space Petri-Pod
