= Weber-OSCAR 18 =

Amateur radio satellite

- Mission type: Amateur radio satellite
- Operator: Weber State University / AMSAT
- COSPAR ID: 1990-005F
- SATCAT no.: 20441

Spacecraft properties
- Bus: Microsat
- Launch mass: 12 kilograms (26 lb)

Start of mission
- Launch date: 22 January 1990, 01:44:35 UTC
- Rocket: Ariane-40 H10
- Launch site: Kourou ELA-2

End of mission
- Last contact: 1998

Orbital parameters
- Reference system: Geocentric
- Regime: Low Earth
- Eccentricity: 0.00119
- Perigee altitude: 777 km (483 mi)
- Apogee altitude: 794 km (493 mi)
- Inclination: 98.2°
- Period: 100.57 minutes
- Epoch: 22 January 1990

Weber-OSCAR 18 (also called WeberSAT, Microsat 3 and WO-18) is an American amateur radio satellite.

The satellite was jointly developed, built by the Weber State College Center for Aerospace Technology and AMSAT, and on January 22, 1990, as a secondary payload, along with the SPOT 2 Earth observation satellite with an Ariane 4 from the Guiana Space Centre, Kourou, French Guiana.

The satellite had an AX.25 digipeater with uplink in the 2-meter band and downlink in the 70-centimeter band, as well as a CCD camera for color images and a piezoelectric detector for micrometeorites.

It was in operation until 1998.

== See also ==
- JAWSAT
