= Space Applications Services =

Belgian aerospace company

Space Applications Services NV/SA
- Type: Private
- Industry: Aerospace
- Founded: 1987; 39 years ago
- Headquarters: Sint-Stevens-Woluwe, Belgium
- Area served: Global
- Key people: Richard Aked (Managing Director), Leif Steinicke (Director)
- Products: Space systems, robotics and payload development. Ground segment solutions. Lunar exploration products including rovers.
- Services: International Space Station access and operations services. Astronaut training.
- Total assets: 7,100,000 (2025)
- Website: spaceapplications.com aerospaceapplications-na.com icecubesservice.com

Space Applications Services is an independent Belgian company founded in 1987, with a subsidiary, Aerospace Applications North America, in Houston, USA. Its aim is to research and develop innovative systems, solutions and products and provide services to the aerospace and security markets and related industries. Its activities cover crewed and uncrewed spacecraft, launch/re-entry vehicles, control centres, robotics and a wide range of information systems. The company is EN 9100 certified (for Space Flight Systems & Ground Support Equipment) and serves clients worldwide. It is owned and managed by its founders, Richard Aked and Leif Steinicke.

== History ==
Space Applications Services was founded in 1987. The initial business line was Human Spaceflight focused on the definition of the European Manned Space Infrastructure. In 1995 a Robotics Team was reestablished, closely followed in 1999 by the Future Projects and Exploration Team and in 2000 by the Flight systems, Avionics and Embedded Systems Teams. The uncrewed spacecraft business line was established in 2001 with focus on Earth Observation Systems Ground Segments. In 2004 Aerospace Applications North America was established in Houston focusing on human machine interaction, systems and technology.

Expanding into uncrewed space systems the Earth Observation Systems Team was established in 2001.

In 2004, Space Applications Services created a subsidiary company in Houston, Texas, the United States of America, called “Aerospace Applications North America, Inc.” (AANA), specialized in Human Machine Interface.

In 2005 the company established a Services business line providing specialist technical services to institutional and non-institutional customers. In 2009 a Knowledge Management team was added(since renamed Artificial Intelligence) and a research office was established in the Netherlands.

The company is currently organized in a Systems Department comprising a Flight Systems Division, a Ground Systems and Software Division and a Technology, Applications and Robotics division, a Services Department and a Business Innovation Unit.

Since 2019, the company is a member of the International Astronautical Federation (IAF).

== Main products and services ==
The company focuses on robotics and mechanisms, ground segment, exploration systems, avionics, and services.

=== ICE Cubes (International Commercial Experiment Cubes) ===
The International Commercial Experiment Cubes or ICE Cubes Service is a commercial service that offers access to space for research, technology or education.

It allows public or private entities to run their experiments on the interior of the International Space Station for access to microgravity. Examples of potential fields of research include pharmaceutical development, microbiology, stem cells, radiation, materials science, 3D printing, fluid sciences and art. The service also allows to demonstrate and validate technologies in microgravity.

ICE Cubes service stems from a partnership between Space Applications Services and the European Space Agency (ESA).

In March 2019, ICE Cubes became an implementation partner at the Center for the Advancement of Science in Space (CASIS), a non-profit organization that manages the ISS United States National Laboratory.

=== Hotdock ===
HOTDOCK is a Standard Interface device for robotic manipulation providing redundant mechanical, power, data and thermal coupling capabilities between payloads and spacecraft or between spacecraft modules. It is considered an essential building block to support the emerging LEO/GEO robotic servicing market (spacecraft maintenance and reconfiguration, large structures assembly in space). It is also targeted to support the robotic needs of future exploration missions.

=== Lunar exploration ===
LUVMI, a lightweight (about 45 kg), low-cost rover with four wheels and adjustable suspension system that is being developed to study the characteristics of the moon's water ice and the volatiles in the lunar crust and atmosphere by drilling into the ground and performing the measurements in-situ.

The company is part of a European aerospace consortium that was awarded a one-year contract by ESA to study a lunar lander mission proposal that would launch by 2025. The purpose of the mission would be to demonstrate the ability to mine lunar regolith and extract resources from it, also called in-situ resource utilization (ISRU). The other partners are ArianeGroup and PTScientists. Space Applications Services will provide ground segment and communications services.

=== Ground segment ===
Space Applications Services is the company behind Yamcs - a framework for command and control over spacecraft, satellites, payloads, ground stations and ground equipment.
