= Fluorescent Deep Space Petri-Pod =

Miniaturised space biology laboratory for fluorescent imaging experiments

Fluorescent Deep Space Petri-Pod (FDSPP) is a miniaturised space biology experiment platform developed for studying biological organisms in microgravity and deep space conditions using fluorescent and white-light imaging. The system was launched on a cargo flight Cygnus NG-24 to the International Space Station (ISS) in April 2026. It is intended for deployment on the ISS as part of biological research into spaceflight effects on living organisms. The project is developed through collaboration between the University of Leicester and the University of Exeter. It is supported by UK space research programs focused on biological experiments in orbit.

== Overview ==
The FDSPP is designed to investigate the effects of spaceflight, including microgravity and radiation exposure, on biological organisms. It supports research relevant to long-duration human spaceflight and exploration beyond Earth orbit. The system is based on a compact experimental platform containing sealed biological chambers for organism exposure and imaging.

The FDSPP integrates environmental control, biological containment, and imaging systems into a compact autonomous unit. It uses fluorescent and white-light imaging to observe biological responses in real time under space conditions. The system is designed to maintain stable micro-environments for biological samples during orbital exposure.

The primary model organism used in FDSPP experiments is the nematode worm Caenorhabditis elegans. They are widely used in space biology due to its genetic simplicity and well-characterised physiology. Fluorescent markers allow monitoring of gene expression and stress responses in spaceflight conditions.

== Mission profile ==
The experiment is planned for deployment aboard the International Space Station after a cargo mission Cygnus NG-24. After initial operation inside the ISS, the payload is exposed to external space conditions including microgravity and radiation. Data from onboard sensors and imaging systems is stored and later transmitted to Earth for analysis.

== See also ==
- Bion – Soviet and Russian spacecraft aimed at biological experiments in space
- BIOPAN – European Space Agency research program
- Biosatellite program – Series of 3 NASA satellites to assess the effects of spaceflight on living organisms
- EXPOSE – External facility on the ISS dedicated to astrobiology experiments
- List of microorganisms tested in outer space
- O/OREOS – NASA nanosatellite with 2 astrobiology experiments on board
- OREOcube – ESA experiment investigating effects of cosmic radiation on organic compounds
- Tanpopo – 2015–18 ISS astrobiology experiment
