= LUVMI =

European lunar rover

- Manufacturer: Space Applications Services
- Country of origin: (European Union) EU; Belgium
- Website: moon.spaceapplications.com

Specifications
- Spacecraft type: Lunar rover

Production
- Launched: 0
- Maiden launch: 2029 (planned)

LUVMI (Lunar Volatiles Mobile Instrumentation) is a family of lightweight Lunar rovers under development by the Belgian company Space Applications Services with the support of EU, ESA, and BELSPO. The LUVMI-M (Medium) type of rover weighs approximately 20 kg and can support up to 20 kg of payload during a 10 to 14 Earth days-long missions on the Moon while traveling up to five km. Its first mission is expected to take place in 2029 on a Blue Moon Mark 1 lunar lander which will deliver the rover to the Lunar south polar region.

== See also ==
- MAGPIE – European lunar rover
