= JAWSAT =

American Military Satellite

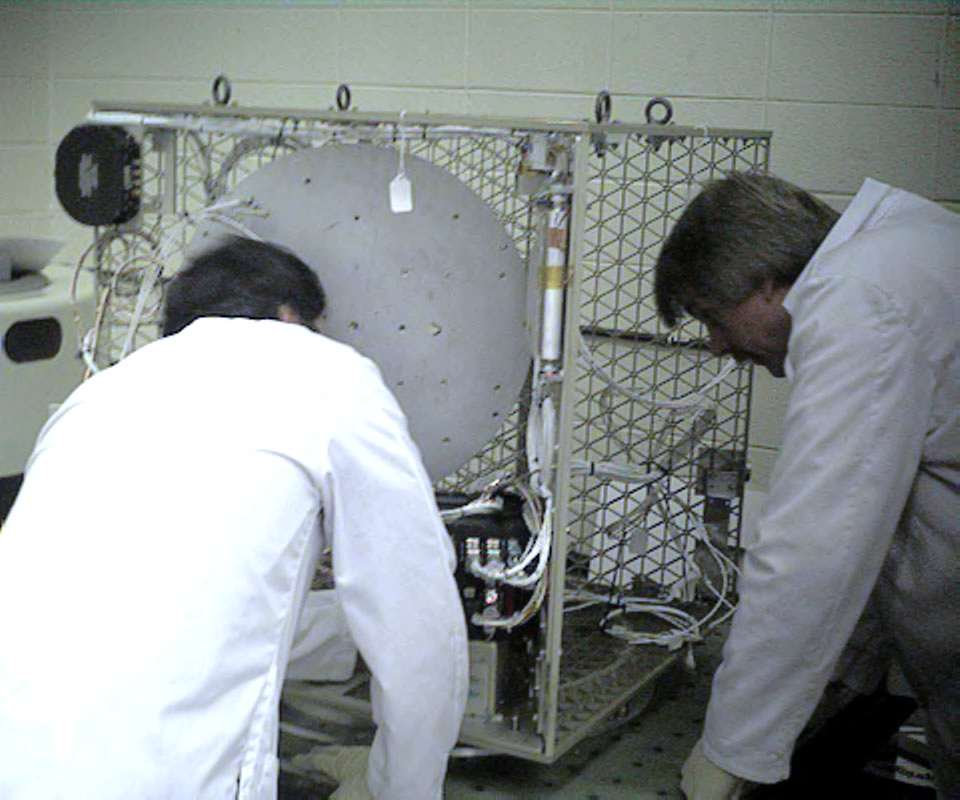
- COSPAR ID: 2000-004A
- SATCAT no.: 26061

Start of mission
- Launch date: January 27, 2000
- Launch site: Vandenberg Air Force Base (VAFB)

The Joint Air Force-Weber State University Satellite (JAWSAT) is an American military mini-satellite launched aboard a Minotaur rocket on January 27, 2000 from Vandenberg Air Force Base (VAFB) in California. After its own launch, JAWSAT deployed four microsatellites: FalconSAT-1, OCSE, OPAL, and ASUSat. JAWSAT also carried NASA's Plasma Experiment Satellite Test (PEST).

== See also ==
- Weber-OSCAR 18
- 2000 in spaceflight
