= Big Red Sat-1 =

2024 American satellite

- Mission type: Technology demonstration
- Operator: University of Nebraska Aerospace Club's Advanced eXperimental Payloads
- Website: https://bigredsat.org/
- Mission duration: 105 days, 5 hours, 36 minutes

Spacecraft properties
- Spacecraft: Big Red Sat-1
- Spacecraft type: CubeSat
- Bus: 1U CubeSat
- Manufacturer: University of Nebraska–Lincoln, National Laboratory of the Rockies
- Launch mass: 0.871 kg

Start of mission
- Launch date: 12 December 2023
- Rocket: (United States) Falcon 9 Block 5
- Launch site: (United States) Cape Canaveral SLC-40
- Deployed from: International Space Station
- Deployment date: 18 April 2024

End of mission
- Disposal: Deorbited
- Decay date: 1 August 2024

Orbital parameters
- Reference system: Geocentric
- Regime: Low Earth orbit

Big Red Sat-1 was the first 1U CubeSat mission that characterized perovskite solar cells in low Earth orbit. This mission was developed by the University of Nebraska–Lincoln, in partnership with the University of Oklahoma and the National Laboratory of the Rockies, with funding from NASA's Educational Launch of Nanosatellites initiative and donors. The design and operation of the satellite was performed by an interdisciplinary team of middle school, high school, undergraduate, and graduate students. The principal investigator for this mission was Professor Karen Stelling at the University of Nebraska–Lincoln. The designs for this mission were made entirely open source for future missions.

== Development ==
Big Red Sat-1 was selected for a launch opportunity by NASA's CubeSat Launch Initiative on 7 April 2021.

High altitude balloons were used to test mission concepts, such as the operation of subsystems in a near-space environment. This led to the development of custom instrumentation to perform curve tracing on the perovskite solar cells while in orbit.

The perovskite solar cell samples were connected into the electrical assembly via pogo-pins. Each sample had its temperature measured using a high-precision temperature sensor epoxied to the back to the sample using EP30-2 epoxy. The enclosure for the samples was designed to retain an internal nitrogen environment to reduce degradation while awaiting launch, but improved encapsulation rendered this a redundancy.

The perovskite solar cells were manufactured by the National Laboratory of the Rockies and Swift Solar. Three samples, each containing six perovskite solar cells, were integrated into an aluminum payload frame for exposure to the low Earth orbit environment.

After completion of a random vibration and sine sweep test, Big Red Sat-1 was integrated into the Nanoracks CubeSat Deployer 27 (NRCSD27) on 12 December 2023 and launched on 21 March 2024 on the SpaceX CRS-30 mission to the International Space Station.

== Funding ==
Big Red Sat-1 was funded by the University of Nebraska–Lincoln College of Engineering, the NASA Nebraska Space Grant, and the CubeSat Launch Initiative. In addition to this funding, Ameritas, Acklie Charitable Foundation, Cooper Foundation, Ethel S. Abbott Charitable Foundation, Millard Public Schools Foundation, Monolith, and the Rodgers Foundation donated to the completion of this mission. Collaborations were also formed with the National Laboratory of the Rockies, University of Oklahoma, and Rhodes College.

== Mission ==
Big Red Sat-1's mission had a scientific and educational component. The goal of this scientific mission is to characterize the performance and degradation of experimental perovskite solar cells from the National Laboratory of the Rockies while in low Earth orbit. To accomplish this, a custom precision curve tracer was designed along with a low-Ohm analog multiplexer that was integrated with Near Space Launch's 1U FastBus CubeSat Platform, which incorporates an electrical power system and Iridium satellite communication system for telemetry.

The educational mission was to engage Nebraska students in an advanced aerospace project from across the educational spectrum. Students from all around Nebraska were recruited to participate and were overseen by undergraduate student mentors. The students learned how to ideate project concepts, validate them, pitch them, and ultimately bring them to life.

== Outcomes ==
Big Red Sat-1 was manifested on ELaNa 51 with three other CubeSats. Big Red Sat-1 was deployed from NRCSD27 by Voyager Space on 18 April 2024 at 18:05:09 UTC. The satellite made first communication with the operations team at 03:00:10 UTC on 19 April 2024. The satellite deorbited sometime after 23:41:51 UTC on 1 August 2024 after 105 days of operation.

Big Red Sat-1 exceeded the specified mission duration by 15 days, operating in low Earth orbit for 105 days. The data from Big Red Sat-1 showed that one of the perovskite solar cells onboard maintained 80% of their power output for the duration of the 105 days in orbit.
