= SpaceX CRS-27 =

2023 American resupply spaceflight to the ISS

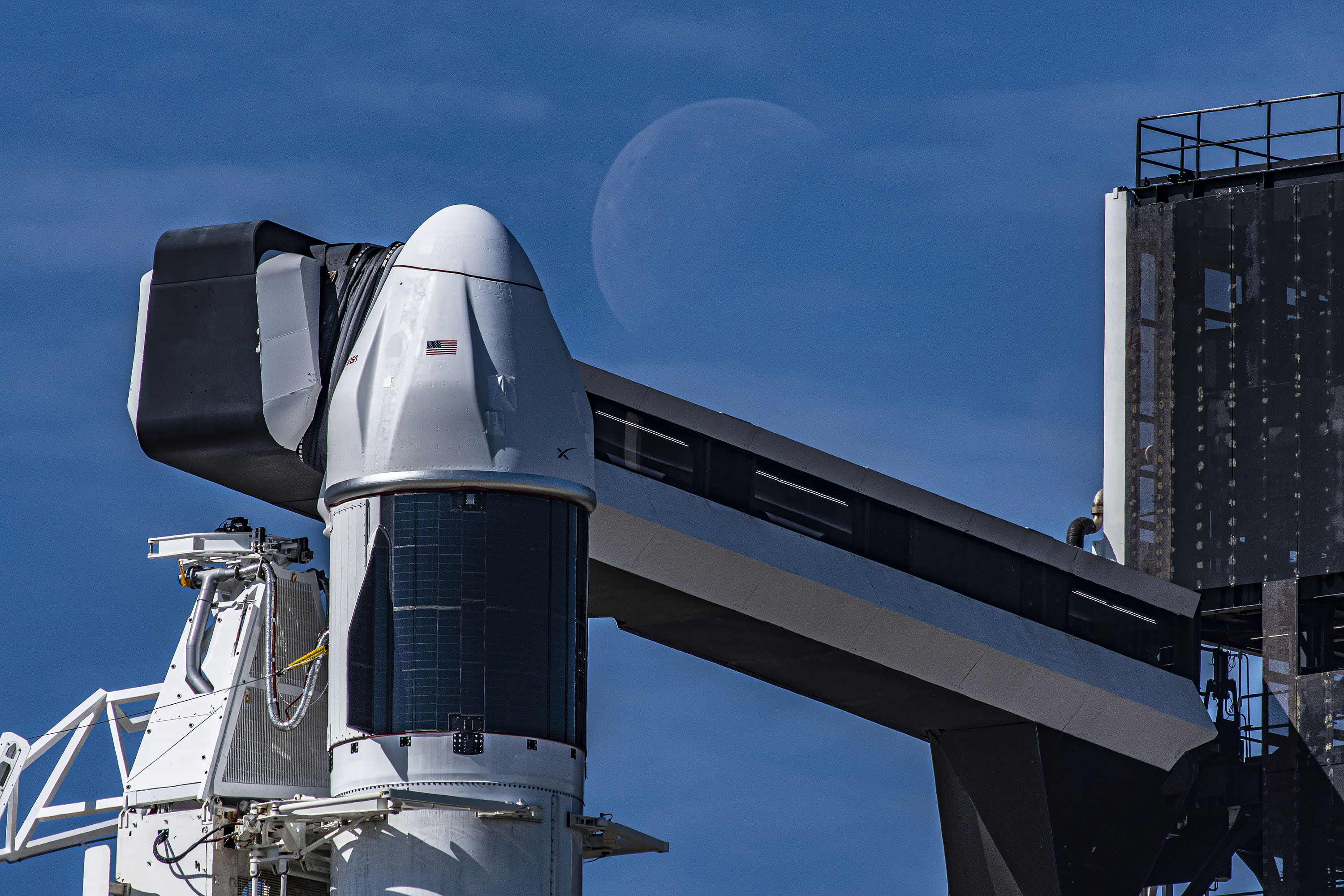
- CRS-27 on the pad
- Names: SpX-27
- Mission type: ISS resupply
- Operator: SpaceX
- COSPAR ID: 2023-033A
- SATCAT no.: 55860
- Mission duration: 31 days, 20 hours, 28 minutes

Spacecraft properties
- Spacecraft: Cargo Dragon C209
- Spacecraft type: Cargo Dragon
- Manufacturer: SpaceX
- Dry mass: 9,525 kg (20,999 lb)

Start of mission
- Launch date: 15 March 2023, 00:30 UTC
- Rocket: Falcon 9 Block 5 B1073-7
- Launch site: Kennedy Space Center, LC-39A

End of mission
- Recovered by: MV Shannon
- Landing date: 15 April 2023, 20:58 UTC
- Landing site: Gulf of Mexico

Orbital parameters
- Reference system: Geocentric orbit
- Regime: Low Earth orbit
- Inclination: 51.66°

Docking with ISS
- Docking port: Harmony forward
- Docking date: 16 March 2023, 11:31 UTC
- Undocking date: 15 April 2023, 15:05 UTC
- Time docked: 30 days, 3 hours, 34 minutes

Cargo
- Mass: 2,852 kg (6,288 lb)
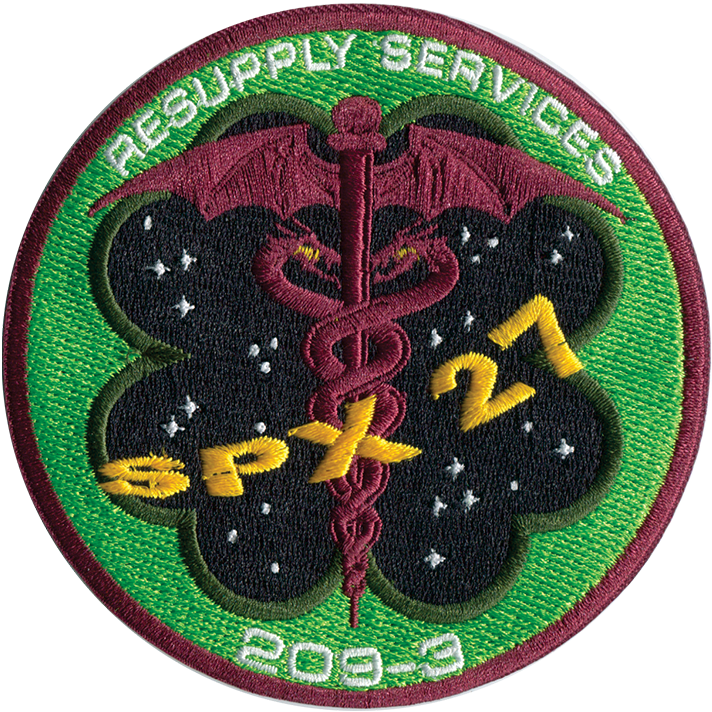
- SpaceX CRS-27 mission patch Commercial Resupply Services Cargo Dragon flights

SpaceX CRS-27, also known as SpX-27, was a Commercial Resupply Service mission to the International Space Station (ISS) launched on 15 March 2023. The mission was contracted by NASA and was flown by SpaceX using Cargo Dragon C209. This was the seventh flight for SpaceX under NASA's CRS Phase 2.

== Cargo Dragon ==
SpaceX plans to reuse the Cargo Dragons up to five times. The Cargo Dragon will launch without SuperDraco abort engines, without seats, cockpit controls and the life support system required to sustain astronauts in space. Dragon 2 improves on Dragon 1 in several ways, including lessened refurbishment time, leading to shorter periods between flights.

The new Cargo Dragon capsules under the NASA CRS Phase 2 contract will land east of Florida in the Atlantic Ocean.

== Payload ==
NASA contracted for the CRS-27 mission from SpaceX and therefore determines the primary payload, date of launch, and orbital parameters for the Cargo Dragon.

- Science investigations: ~1,200 kg (2,600 lb)
- Vehicle hardware: ~540 kg (1,190 lb)
- Crew supplies: ~910 kg (2,010 lb)
- Spacewalk equipment: ~170 kg (370 lb)
- Computer resources: ~0 kg (0 lb)-30 kg (66 lb)
- External payloads: 530 kg (1,170 lb)

=== STP-H9 ===
A technology demonstration mission which consists of the following payloads:

- SWELL (Space Wireless Energy Laser Link), a test payload for laser power beaming.
- Electric Propulsion Electrostatic Analyzer, A test device that will demonstrate re-boost using ion propulsion.
- Neutron Radiation Detection Instrument from NRL
- Variable Voltage Ion Protection Experiment from NRL
- ECLIPSE (Experiment for Characterizing the Lower Ionosphere and Production of Sporadic-E)
- Glowbug, cosmic ray detector built in conjunction with NASA, an experiment that will study cosmic rays for two years.
- SpaceCube Edge Node Intelligent Collaboration, an experiment built by NASA Goddard that will study microchips and artificial intelligence exposed to the vacuum of space.
- SOHIP, a hyperspectral imager built by Livermore Labs that will study the atmosphere for two years.

== Research ==
Various experiments were transported to the orbiting laboratory, and provided valuable insight for researchers. These include student projects that were given the opportunity to fly and operate their experiments on the ISS as part of DLR's Überflieger 2 competition. Among them are the projects:

- FARGO (Ferrofluid Application Research Goes Orbital) of the Small Satellite Student Society of the University of Stuttgart (KSat e.V.)
- Glücksklee
- BRAINS (Biological Research using Artificial Intelligence for Neuroscience in Space)
- ADDONISS (Ageing and Degenerative Diseases of Neurons on the ISS)

European Space Agency (ESA) research and activities:

- ESA's BIOFILMS (Biofilm Inhibition On Flight equipment and on board the ISS using microbiologically Lethal Metal Surfaces) experiment investigating bacterial biofilm formation and antimicrobial properties of different metal surfaces under spaceflight conditions in altered gravity.

NASA Glenn Research Center studies:

Materials International Space Station Experiment MISSE-17:

- Vitrimeric reversible adhesive for in-space assembly

Mouse Habitat Unit-8 (MHU-8) mission - The NASA-JAXA Joint Partial-gravity Rodent Research Mouse Habitat Unit-8 (JPG-RR MHU-8) mission tested the impact of spaceflight and induced partial gravities on mice. The gravities tested were 0, 0.33, 0.66, 1 g. An interdisciplinary team of investigators will study how multiple biological systems (bone, muscle, cardiovascular system, neuro-performance, circadian rhythms, and microbiome) respond to these conditions.

== CubeSats ==
CubeSats planned for this mission:

NEUDOSE

The NEUtron DOSimetry & Exploration (NEUDOSE) mission from the McMaster Interdisciplinary Satellite Team aims to further our understanding of long-term exposure to space radiation by investigating how charged and neutral particles contribute to the human equivalent dose during low-Earth orbit (LEO) missions. NEUDOSE is a 2U CubeSat built by students at McMaster University. The scientific goals of the project are to:

- Demonstrate the Charged & Neutral Particle Tissue Equivalent Proportional Counter (CNP-TEPC) instrument, that allows for the discrimination of dose from charged and neutral particles in real-time.
- Map the contribution of charged and neutral particle dose rates in LEO.

The mission objectives also include providing early-career science and engineering students with valuable leadership, technical, and flight project development skills. Furthermore, the NEUDOSE mission is involved with the development of amateur radio operators and custom hardware.

Northern SPIRIT

Three CubeSat satellites were built in part of the Northern Space Program for Innovative Research and Integrated Training (Northern SPIRIT). These CubeSats were constructed as a collaboration between Yukon University, Aurora Research Institute in the Northwest Territories, and the University of Alberta. This initiative is supported by the Canadian Space Agency (CSA) as a part of the Canadian CubeSat Project (CCP). In addition to what's below, all three satellites have a primary goal of gathering magnetic field data of the ionosphere to study small scale field-aligned currents.

- Ex-Alta 2: A 3U CubeSat built by students from the University of Alberta's student organization AlbertaSat. Ex-Alta 2's primary mission is to obtain scientific data for wildfire research and prevention. Additionally, Ex-Alta 2 was designed to promote the long-term goal of a fully open-sourced cube satellite, and the development of the Albertan commercial space industry.
- AuroraSAT and YukonSat: 2U CubeSats built by students from the Aurora Research Institute and Yukon University in collaboration with the University of Alberta, who provided the bus for each cubesat and did final integration of payloads. One of the two primary missions is the Northern Images Mission, which will display art on a small screen on the satellite, and then take images of this art from space with the Earth in the background. Children across Northern Canada will have the opportunity to have their artwork featured. The Northern Voices Mission will transmit and broadcast recordings of Northern Canadian stories and perspectives in amateur radio bands across the world.

ELaNa 50

This new iteration of the ELaNa (Educational Launch of Nanosatellites) initiative will consist of two cubesats from American education institutes:

- ARKSat-1: 1U CubeSat developed by students at the University of Arkansas, its main mission will be to perform atmospheric measurements through the ground detection of a LED signal from orbit. Furthermore after the end of the mission the cubesat will make use of a Solid State Inflatable Balloon (SSIB) to increase the spacecraft's drag and speed up its re-entry.
- LightCube: 1U CubeSat developed by students at the Arizona State University, it carries a flash bulb that can be remotely activated by radio amateurs to produce a brief flash visible from the ground.

== Gallery ==
SpaceX CRS-27
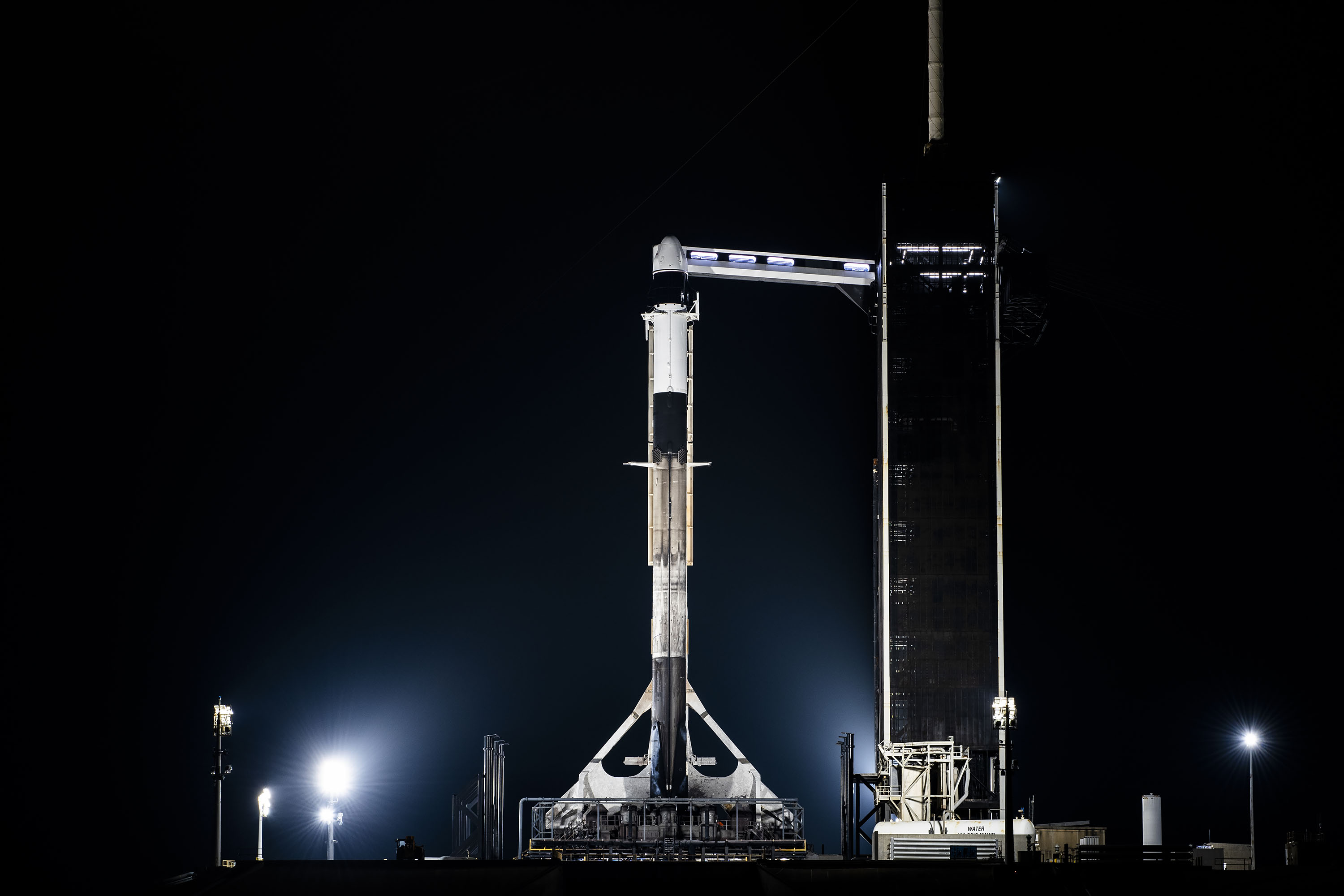
Falcon 9 ahead of flight

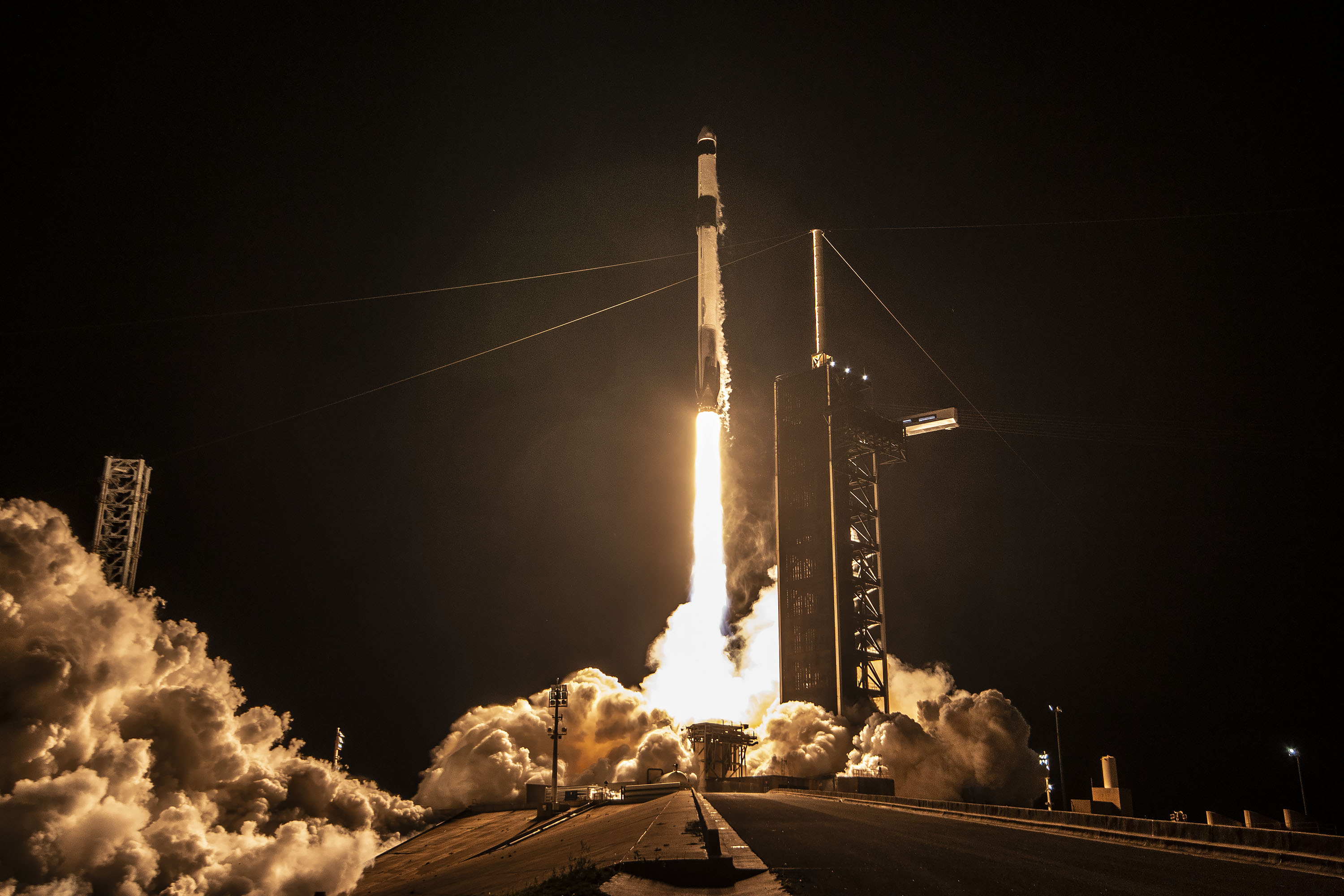
Launch of CRS-27

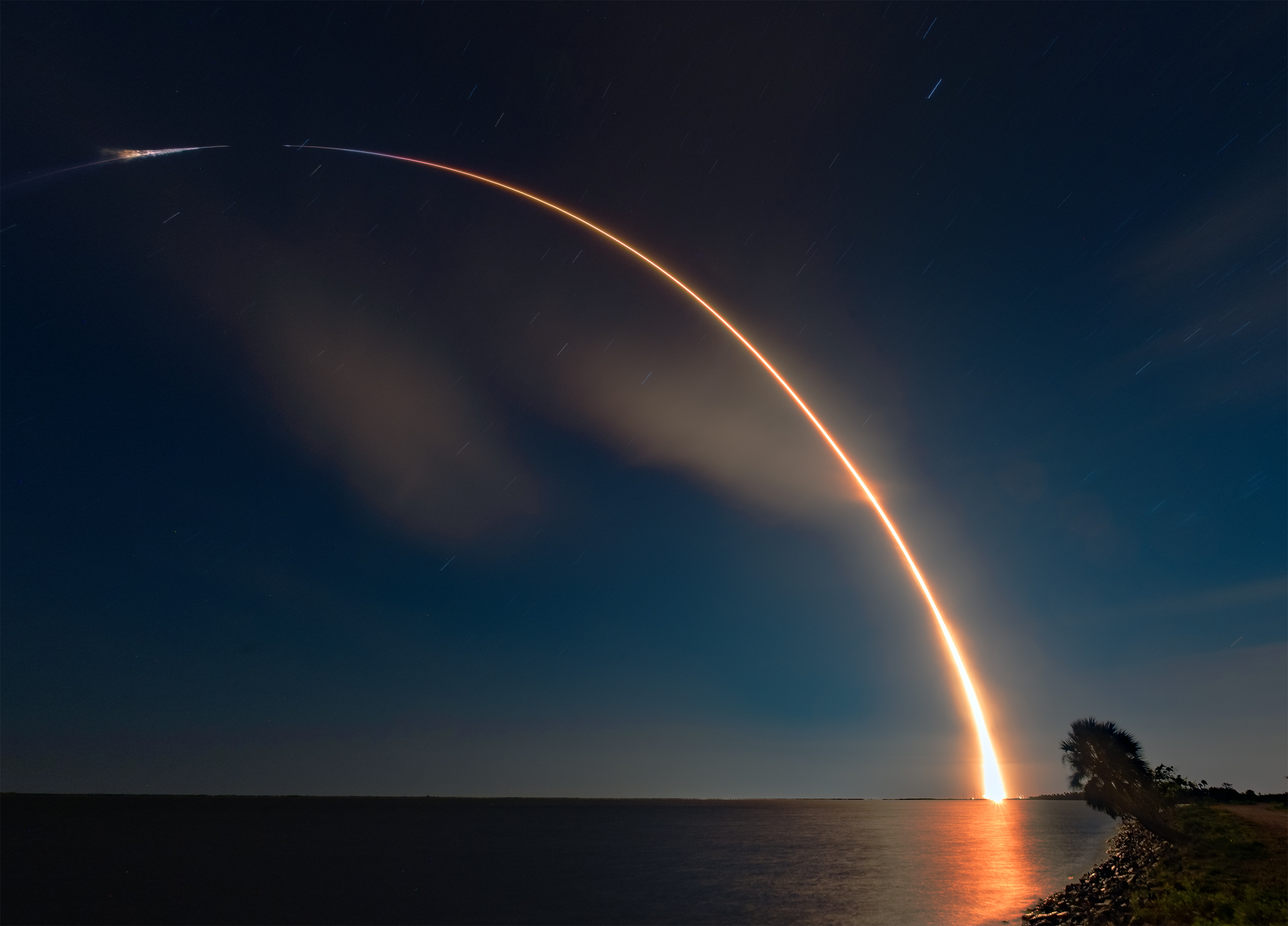
Long-exposure image of launch

== See also ==
- Uncrewed spaceflights to the International Space Station
