= RHOK-SAT =

NASA CubeSat Photovoltaic Test

- Mission type: Technology demonstration
- Operator: Rhodes College
- Mission duration: Planned: 1 year (estimated)

Spacecraft properties
- Spacecraft type: CubeSat
- Bus: 1U CubeSat
- Manufacturer: Rhodes College, University of Oklahoma
- Launch mass: 1.33 kg

Start of mission
- Launch date: September 14, 2025 (planned)
- Rocket: (United States) Falcon 9 Block 5
- Launch site: (United States) Cape Canaveral SLC-40

Orbital parameters
- Reference system: Geocentric
- Regime: Low Earth orbit
- Inclination: TBD

RHOK-SAT is a 1U CubeSat project, developed through a partnership between Rhodes College and the University of Oklahoma's Photovoltaic Materials and Devices group. It is part of NASA's CubeSat Launch Initiative and aims to test the durability and efficiency of novel photovoltaic devices in space.

== Development ==
The development of RHOK-SAT has provided an opportunity for liberal arts students at Rhodes College to gain real-world engineering experience. The project is a distinctive feature of the college’s curriculum, with students participating in all aspects of the satellite's development. The launch of RHOK-SAT is targeted for late 2023 or early 2024. The flight software of the satellite is currently under development and in the testing phase, which is crucial for the operation and data collection of the mission.

== Mission ==
RHOK-SAT's mission involves both educational and scientific objectives. It aims to provide hands-on experience in spacecraft development to students and to test the performance of 36 experimental perovskite solar cells in the low Earth orbit environment. The data collected will contribute to the advancement of solar power technology for space applications.The satellite's payload includes a set of 36 experimental perovskite photovoltaic cells, one control CIGS cell, measurement microcontrollers, multiplexers, temperature sensors, and a custom-developed Sun sensor. This sensor will determine the angle of incident sunlight, which is vital for assessing the cells' performance.
