= ASUSat-1 =

American amateur radio satellite

ASUSat
- Mission type: Communications
- Operator: ASU
- COSPAR ID: 2000-004E
- SATCAT no.: 26065
- Website: nasa.asu.edu/asusat/

Spacecraft properties
- Launch mass: 5 kg (11 lb)

Start of mission
- Launch date: 27 January 2000, 03:03 UTC
- Rocket: Minotaur-I
- Launch site: Vandenberg CLF

End of mission
- Last contact: 28 January 2000

Orbital parameters
- Reference system: Geocentric
- Regime: Low Earth
- Eccentricity: 0.0
- Altitude: 773 kilometres (480 mi)
- Inclination: 100.2°
- Period: 100.4 minutes
- Epoch: 27 January 2000

ASUSat-1 (Arizona State University Satellite, also known as ASU-OSCAR 37) was a U.S. amateur radio satellite that was developed and built for educational purposes by students at Arizona State University. It was equipped with two digital cameras for tracking changes to Earth's coasts and forests.

== Background ==
ASUSat-1 was a 6 kilogram satellite designed, fabricated, tested, and tracked by the students at ASU for low-cost Earth imagery, experimental verification of composite-material models, and technology demonstration purposes. The project began in October 1993 with the satellite being delivered to Weber State on May 13, 1999 for final integration on JAWSAT on June 23, 1999.

Shea Ferring, Firefly VP of Mission Assurance worked on ASUSat-1.

== Mission ==
ASUSat was launched on January 27, 2000, along with JAWSAT with a Minotaur I rocket from Vandenberg Air Force Base, Lompoc, California. ASUSat was received 50 minutes after the start in South Africa, later also in New Zealand and the United States. During two overflights over Arizona, Arizona State University students were able to receive and control the satellite remotely. 14 hours into the mission the ASU team received telemetry data that the satellite was having a critical problem with its power system preventing its solar arrays from supplying sufficient power. The probe only had 15 hours of battery life and contact was lost shortly after their final telemetry report.

== Frequencies ==
- Uplink: 145.900 MHz
- Downlink: 436.700 MHz

== See also ==
- OSCAR
