= Center for the Advancement of Science in Space =

Other organization in Melbourne, United States

The Center for the Advancement of Science in Space (CASIS), a non-profit organization, is the manager of the International Space Station United States National Laboratory, a US government-funded laboratory with principal research facilities located in the United States Orbital Segment of the International Space Station (ISS).

== History ==
The 2005 NASA Authorization Act designated the US segment of ISS as a National Lab in order to "...help improve life on Earth, foster relationships among NASA, other Federal agencies, and the private sector, and advance STEM education through utilization of unique ISS Capabilities in microgravity."

In the NASA Authorization Act of 2010, Congress directed NASA to select an entity to manage the US National Laboratory. In August 2011, NASA entered into a 10-year agreement with CASIS in order to maximize the use of the ISS US segment as a National Laboratory.

Since CASIS began managing the National Lab in 2011, the organization has selected more than 200 ISS projects, ranging from stem cell research, drug development, materials testing and new consumer products, to monitoring atmospheric conditions from space, 3D printing, and surgical robot testing. Of the 270 payloads that CASIS has sent to the ISS, 176 have been for commercial companies including Merck, Novartis, Eli Lilly and Company, Hewlett Packard Enterprise, Honeywell, and Procter & Gamble.

In July 2017, NASA extended the contract with CASIS to manage the US National Lab through September 2024.

== Missions and operations ==
The mission of CASIS is "to advance the nation's leadership in commercial space, pursue groundbreaking science not possible on Earth, and leverage the space station to inspire the next generation."

CASIS endeavors to provide:

- seed money to fund research projects and product development
- aerospace expertise to assist researchers in utilizing in-space laboratory assets
- access to space via several launch providers
- administrative support "to cut through red tape to facilitate quick access to space"
- educational outreach projects and curricula to teach and inspire students across the country through its STEM Program.

CASIS currently contributes to a space-based economy, serving the academic and industrial research communities by providing access to the ISS. The National Lab has conducted business in space for the past six years. During that time, it has built intellectual capital and a network of researchers that utilize existing resources on the ISS or partner with the National Lab to develop new research platforms in space. In addition, the National Lab supports approximately three-dozen privately owned technology companies that provide services to researchers on the ISS. This web of researchers and technology companies work together with the staff at the National Lab to convert terrestrial research into experiments that can be performed in low Earth orbit, and to develop and validate new technologies for use on the ISS. This model has served the research community well and the National Lab fully utilizes its 50% allocation of ISS resources.

Over the past five years, the National Lab has used $75M of NASA funding to generate an additional $150M of non-NASA, non-National Lab funds to support research. In FY2018 alone, two new research platforms, four patents and 17 research articles have been enabled by the National Lab. There are 14 research platforms on the ISS that have been implemented. The National Lab is the only NASA-funded, non-NASA asset that has sufficient experience to immediately up-scale its level of activity to positively impact an economy-in-space model. The problem with this type of commercialization is that it is limited in its ability to generate revenue and still requires a great deal of NASA-subsidized access to the ISS. In addition, the research performed in this manner is typically discontinuous and generally of low impact. The National Lab is using its existing capabilities to enable the next phase of commercialization in space.

== Research ==
The US National Lab conducts research in life sciences, physical sciences, technology development and remote sensing for a wide variety of academic, government and commercial users.

Researchers preferred to conduct experiments in space because of the unique effects that microgravity, or weightlessness, has on physical and biological phenomena.Microgravity provides researchers with conditions that can improve the sensitivity of measurements across a range of scientific fields. The National Lab also enables the study of the long-term effects of microgravity on various organisms, from bacteria to humans

Another benefit of experimenting in space is the exposure of materials to its extreme conditions, including the large amounts of radiation and hot and cold temperature cycling. The knowledge of how these conditions influence materials allows researchers to manufacture long-life reliable components used on Earth.

The National Lab also has unique remote sensing capabilities. The orbital path of the ISS travels over the regions of Earth that contain more than 90 percent of the Earth's population, giving scientists a unique view of the planet. In addition to the view, the ISS also provides better spatial resolution and variable lighting conditions as compared to the orbits of typical Earth observation satellites, which pass over the same area at the same time every day.

== Education initiatives ==
CASIS was chosen by NASA to both manage the National Lab and develop education programs that will motivate students to pursue careers in science, technology, engineering and mathematics (STEM) industries.

To encourage STEM education and interest, the National Lab supports hands-on, problem-based learning opportunities that transition the ISS research into real-world settings for K-12 students. The National Lab also funds student internships and teacher fellowships, and supports teacher professional development training in STEM-related areas.

In 2016, CASIS developed a program called Space Station Explorers, a community of educators and organizations that provide programs, activities and lesson plans for students who are interested in the ISS.

The Space Station Explorers Program includes opportunities for students to launch their own projects into space. Some of the Space Station Explorer experiments have allowed students to observe genetic changes in astronauts' DNA, learn how bacteria grows differently in space, and track the development of tadpoles into four-legged frogs.
