= ISS National Lab =

Public research laboratory on the U.S. Orbital Segment of the International Space Station

- Logo of the laboratory; a silhouette of the International Space Station
- Established: 2005
- Budget: US$15 million per year
- Field of research: Life sciences, physical sciences, technology development and remote sensing
- Location: International Space Station
- Operating agency: Center for the Advancement of Science in Space (CASIS)
- Website: issnationallab.org

The ISS U.S. National Lab, commonly known as the ISS National Lab, is a U.S. government-funded national laboratory established on 30 December 2005 by the 2005 NASA Authorization Act. With principal research facilities located in the United States Orbital Segment (USOS) of the International Space Station (ISS), the Laboratory conducts research in life sciences, physical sciences, technology development and remote sensing for a broad range of academic, government and commercial users. Of the 270 payloads that the Center for the Advancement of Science in Space (CASIS) has sent to the ISS, 176 have been for commercial companies including Merck & Co., Novartis, Eli Lilly and Company, Hewlett Packard Enterprise, Honeywell, and Procter & Gamble.

== History ==
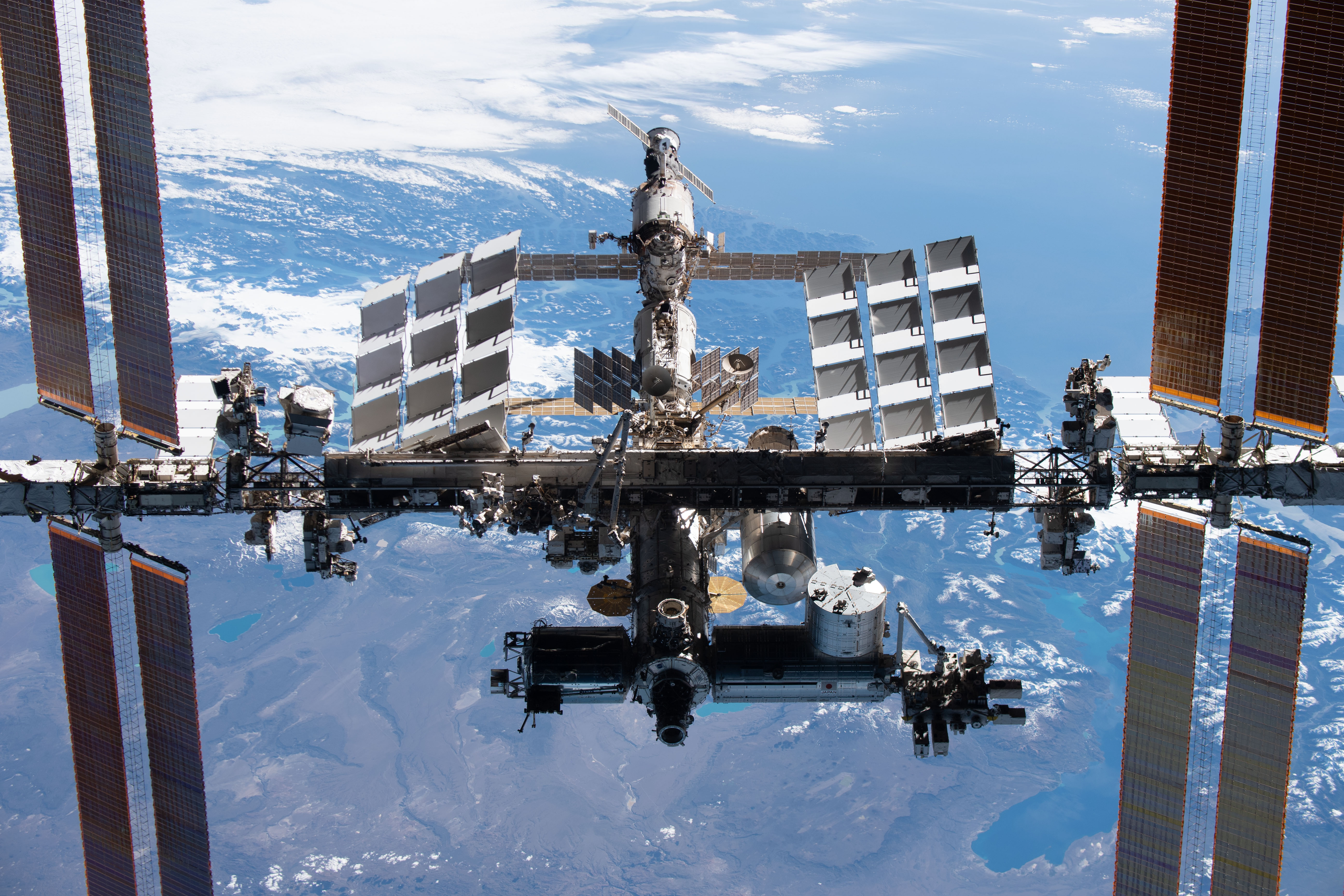
International Space Station after undocking of SpaceX Crew 2

The ISS has been an operational science platform since the installation of the Destiny module in February 2001. The 2005 NASA Authorization Act designated the U.S. segment of ISS as a National Lab in order to "...help improve life on Earth, foster relationships among NASA, other Federal agencies, and the private sector, and advance STEM education through utilization of unique ISS Capabilities in microgravity". In the NASA Authorization Act of 2010, Congress directed NASA to choose a not-for-profit entity to manage the U.S. National Lab. In August 2011, NASA entered into a 10-year agreement with CASIS in order to fully develop the ISS U.S. segment as a National Laboratory. In July 2017, NASA extended the contract with CASIS to manage the U.S. National Lab through September 2024.

== Facilities ==
Scientific research facilities on the National Lab provide infrastructure and equipment to conduct experiments in microgravity. Facilities typically remain on station for extended periods of time to support repeat and long-term research opportunities. Many facilities are managed by private sector companies. Facility managers support use of the on-station equipment for investigations from organizations other than the hardware's developer and owner, validating a business model for in-orbit commercial services at lower costs. The National Lab now has 14 commercially operated laboratory facilities managed by eight companies, including two newly installed facilities in FY18 and one new facility manager.

Additive Manufacturing Facility: by utilizing a 3D printer, this manufacturing facility can perform station maintenance, build tools, upgrade and install new hardware and repair sections of the ISS in case of an emergency. Its manufacturing capabilities also support a wide range of commercial interests on the ISS.

ADvanced Space Experiment Processor (ADSEP): this thermally controlled facility accommodates experiments in cell technology, model organisms, multiphase fluids, solution chemistry, separation science, microencapsulation, and crystal growth.

Bone Densitometer: this facility provides bone density scanning of mice during space flight, which helps researchers study human bone disease.

Materials ISS Experiment-Flight Facility (MISSE-FF): a facility that tests materials, coatings, and components in space. Experiments will show how materials react to ultraviolet radiation (UV), atomic oxygen (AO), ionizing radiation, ultra-high vacuum (UHV), charged particles, thermal cycles, electromagnetic radiation, and micrometeoroids. Industries that benefit from testing include Advanced Materials, Automotive, Aeronautics, Energy, Space (flight hardware, astronaut clothing and protection), Transportation and Micro-meteoroid On-Orbit Debris (MMOD).

Multi-use Variability-g Platform (MVP): a facility that provides artificial gravity, temperature, humidity, oxygen and carbon dioxide control when testing in space. It supports research in Drosophila, C. Elegans, cultured cells, plants, aquatic animals, protein crystallization, tissue chips, and functional gravity studies.

MUSES (Multi User System for Earth Sensing): this facility hosts earth-viewing instruments, such as high-resolution digital cameras and hyperspectral imagers, and provides precision pointing. The data gathered from this facility can be used for: Maritime domain awareness, Agricultural Awareness, Food security, Disaster response, Air quality, Oil/Gas Exploration, Fire detection, and Heritage Preservation.

Nanoracks CubeSat Deployer: a device that is designed to deploy satellites, or CubeSats, into orbit from the ISS. A CubeSat is a stackable, modular, ground loaded launch case that can accommodate up to 6.5U. The CubeSat deployer system can mechanically and electrically isolate CubeSats from the ISS, cargo resupply vehicles, and ISS crew.

Nanoracks External Platform: installed on the outside of the ISS, this is the first external commercial research capability for sensor, material and electronic testing that can be retrieved and returned to Earth. It delivers research results concerning biological testing, sensor target testing, satellite communications components testing, power systems testing, and materials testing.

Nanoracks Internal Platform (Nanolab): measuring 10 cm by 10 cm by 10 cm, this is a box unit that flies a researcher's project to the ISS. This miniaturized hardware has a circuit board that activates the experiment, turns it off and can be functioned for other activities. NanoLabs are plugged into the facility's platform using a USB port, allowing data and power to flow.

Nanoracks PlateReader: a laboratory instrument designed to detect biological, chemical or physical events of samples in microtiter plates. Microplate readers are widely used in research, drug discovery, bioassay validation, quality control and manufacturing processes in the pharmaceutical and biotechnological industry. It also has temperature control capability, making long-term incubation of samples possible, such as measuring microbial growth or monitoring gene expression.

Space Automated Bioproduct Lab (SABL): can be used for experiments in the life, physical and material sciences with a focus on supporting research of biological systems and processes. Microorganisms, small organisms, animal cells, tissue cultures, and small plants are studied in this lab.

Space Technology and Advanced Research Systems (STaARS): a research platform with the capacity to support physical science, advanced biotechnology, and life science research by providing reliable temperature control, controllable experiment hardware, and rapid flight access. Findings impact pharmaceutical, tissue engineering, regenerative medicine, biofuel, and discovery sciences.

TangoLab-1: a fully automated, multipurpose, reconfigurable general research facility on the ISS.

TangoLab-2: a fully automated, multipurpose, reconfigurable general research facility on the ISS. The primary difference between TangoLab-1 and TangoLab-2 is an upgraded fan system which allows for a greater heat rejection capability. This enables research with greater power draw and lower temperature requirements.

== Research ==
=== Life Sciences ===
All living organisms on Earth are continually influenced by gravitational forces on both macro and molecular levels. The microgravity conditions in space induce changes in DNA regulation, expression of genes and cell structure and function. Understanding the impact of gravitational force on living systems and their biochemical processes advances research in the fields of biology, genetics, health care, medicine, microbiology, plant and crop sciences, nanotechnology, and pharmaceutical and regenerative medicine.

==== Research examples ====
===== Stem Cell Research =====
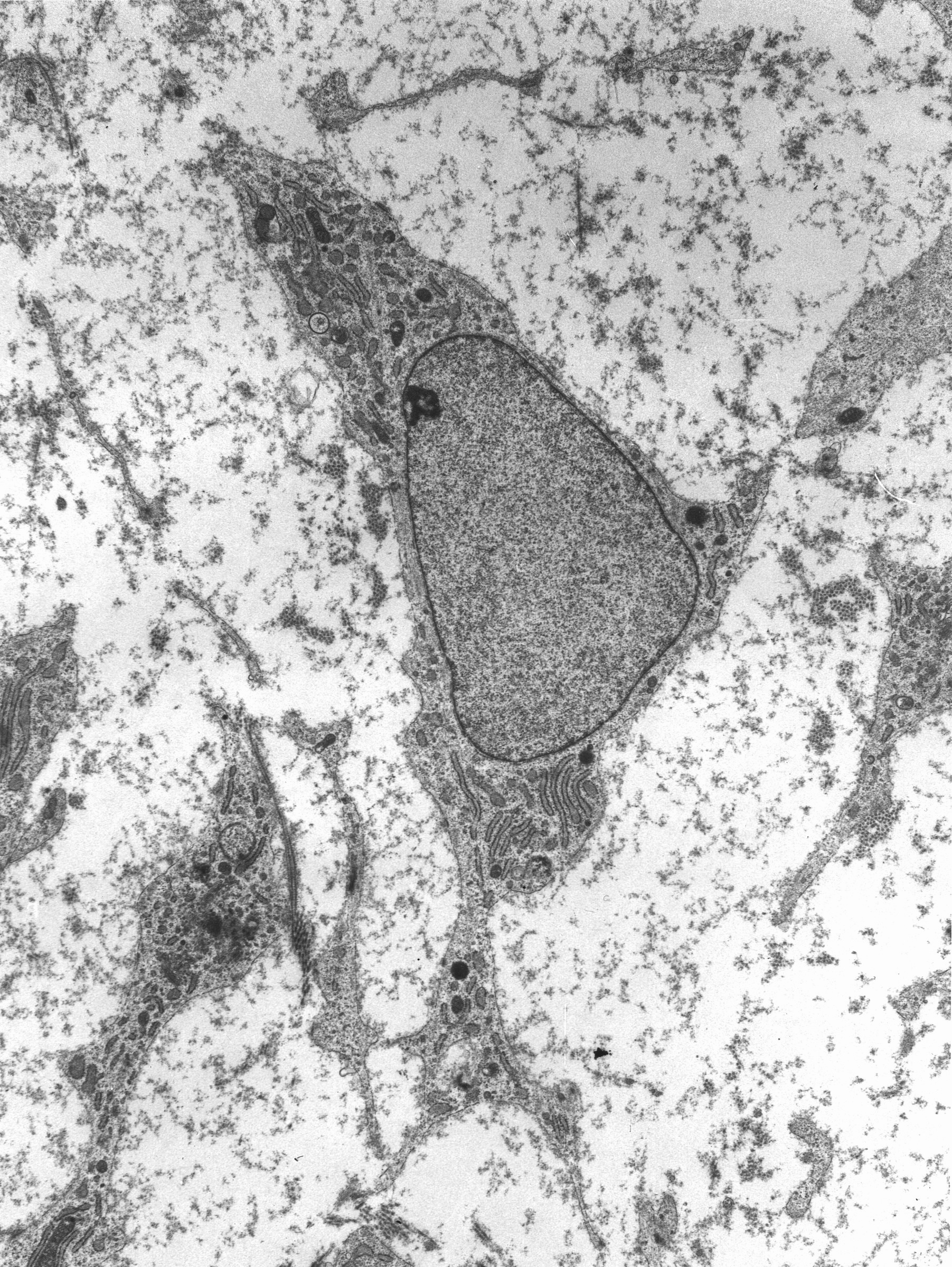
Stem cells

It has been shown that stem cells, the master cells that produce all organ and tissue cell types, may grow faster in microgravity as compared to cells grown conventionally in gravity. The conditions in space also allow for the formation of three-dimensional tissues coupled with the differentiation of stem-cells into different cell types that better mimic the functions of tissues and organ systems.

One scientist is experimenting with human stem cells in space to improve treatments for stroke victims. The goal is to "expand the population of stem cells that will induce regeneration of neurons and blood vessels in patients who have suffered a hemorrhagic stroke...". This kind of research is being conducted in labs on Earth using incubators, but growing the stem cells takes an extended period of time. This scientist believes that testing in space will accelerate the growth of the cells. Researchers are also using a technology called organs-on-chips or tissues-on-chips to build tiny versions of human systems. These microchip-like devices are embedded with living cells that will react in space as if the full organ was there. Scientists believe these chips will eventually replace traditional dish cultures and animal testing for studying disease and testing new drugs. The latest tissues-on-chip experiment on the ISS involves growing functional bone tissue.

===== Protein Crystallization =====
Microgravity also allows scientists to grow more higher-quality protein crystals that could help improve drug design. Scientists choose to conduct this type of research on the ISS because it's easier to maintain uniform temperatures in liquids in microgravity because of the absence of convection driving the mixing of fluids with different temperature and density. Without convection, the movement of fluids of different density and temperature occurs because of diffusion which is slower than convection. This makes the process of growing crystals more precise.

U.S. Lab researchers are growing protein crystals of the Parkinson's disease protein LRRK2. When grown in labs on Earth, the protein's crystals are small and have numerous defects. Scientists believe the effects of microgravity will allow the protein crystals to grow larger and with minimal flaws, which would make the structure easier to analyze. If successful, scientists believe they could develop a drug that would inhibit this protein, either preventing or slowing the progression of this disease. This type of research could also be useful for cystic fibrosis and Huntington's disease because scientists have not been able to grow crystals of the active proteins on Earth with good enough quality to image.

Protein crystallization could also have an impact on the delivery method of a cancer drug that is currently on the market. The hope is that the lack of gravity-induced variability while formulating the drug on the ISS could help the company improve the administration and effectiveness of the drug by turning an hours long intravenous infusion into a simple injection.

===== Bone Glue =====
Another scientist is testing a new glue that fixes fractured bone and stabilizes the seal between metal hardware and bones. The researcher found that when the bone was glued back together on Earth, the materials eventually converted to new bone over time. The researcher is now testing the glue in space to see if it accelerates the formation of new bone.

This scientist believes that surgeries on fractured bone could become a lot less complicated if bone glue were used instead of metal plates, screws and rods.

===== Analyzing Bacterial Growth =====
Scientists are also analyzing bacterial growth on the ISS and the mutations that may determine the next superbug, or strains of bacteria that have resistance to multiple antibiotic drugs. Observing these mutations will help them develop medicines that will eliminate bacteria such as Methicillin-resistant Staphylococcus aureus (MRSA), which is easily spread and very difficult to treat.

===== Immune System responses =====
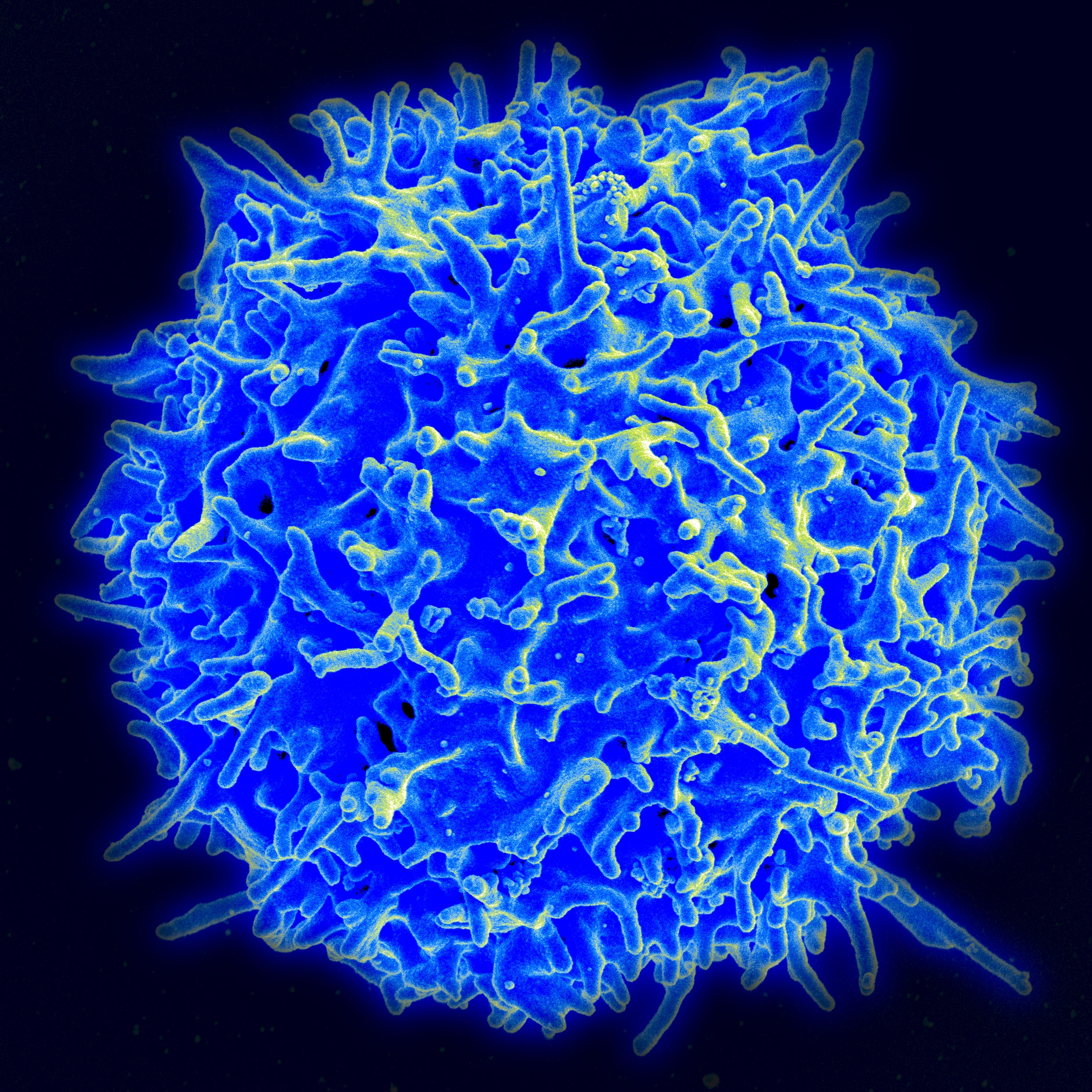
Human T-Cell

One study aims to find treatments for age-related illnesses by observing how microgravity affects T-cells, the type of white blood cells responsible for immune responses. In low gravity, T-cells only activate around half as often or less than the control samples, indicating a reduced ability to fight infection. Because living in microgravity accelerates the same type of problems that old age does, this researcher is interested in determining the earliest point at which T-cells become different in space.

===== Genetic Changes in DNA =====
Using a machine to analyze genes, one researcher is testing whether astronauts experience genetic changes in their DNA that would cause them to have weakened immune systems when in space. The findings in this experiment are important because it will determine if astronauts would be able to conduct experiments in space for extended periods of time.

===== Experiments with Model Organisms =====
For example, scientists are using microgravity's unique ability to accelerate bone deterioration to study rodent bone loss in space. The experiment involves studying how NELL-1, a molecule in humans that has the ability to grow new bone, works as a treatment for preventing bone loss in mice in space. The findings could lead to the development of treatments in bone restoration, bone loss prevention and bone grafting.

=== Remote sensing ===
The orbital path of the ISS travels over the regions of Earth that contain more than 90 percent of the Earth's population, giving scientists a unique view of our planet. In addition to the view, the ISS also provides better spatial resolution and variable lighting conditions as compared with other satellites used for Earth observation. These new technologies are advancing studies in agriculture, water quality, natural resources, atmospheric monitoring and maritime tracking.

==== Research examples ====
===== Atmospheric Sensors =====
A Lightning Imaging Sensor was attached to the ISS on one of its missions to monitor lightning flashes on Earth. The data gathered will help scientists predict weather changes, climate changes and atmospheric changes. Another sensor was attached to the spaceship to monitor changes in the ozone layer.

===== Monitoring Meteor Showers from Space =====
A camera was installed on the ISS for a two-year period to monitor meteor showers from space. This investigation helped scientists better understand the behavior of asteroids and comets and how they have affected our planet. The results from the study could also help protect us from potential collisions.

===== Red Tide Research =====
Red tide, a harmful algal bloom that releases toxins into our oceans, has been studied on the ISS. Using a special imager that was attached to the spaceship, scientists collected data that helped them detect and classify algal blooms.

=== Physical Sciences ===
The loss of buoyancy in space allows scientists to conduct fundamental research in fluid dynamics, combustion, and material sciences. Gaining more understanding of these concepts facilitates advances in the fields of transportation, power generation, manufacturing, and medicine; while at the same time evolving standards for safety and efficiency in multiple disciplines.

==== Research examples ====
===== Artificial Limbs =====
One of the biggest challenges in space travel is the effect that radiation has on both synthetic and natural materials. As a result, scientists are conducting research to see if a new gel-like material, designed to be used to make lifelike synthetic muscles for artificial limbs used by humans and robots, could survive a trip to Mars. This material is being tested on the ISS to determine if it retains its durability, flexibility and strength with high levels of radiation.

===== Study that Focuses on How Certain Pharmaceuticals Dissolve =====
A pharmaceutical company is conducting an experiment on liquid-solid interactions and how pharmaceuticals dissolve in microgravity. The results could lead to more effective medicines that last longer on the shelf.

===== Surgical Robots =====
Surgical robots are being tested in space to increase the efficiency of research conducted on the ISS. The robots will be able to perform small dexterous tasks, which will both expand the type of research that can be performed in space, as well as give the flight crew more time to focus on other experiments.

===== Consumer Products =====
Two companies are conducting experiments in space in order to improve consumer products. One company is testing a more efficient showerhead that uses an "oscillating chip" to break up the water and release it faster so that we use less water in the shower. Another is studying how a compound called silica forms in microgravity so it can produce more fuel-efficient tires.

=== Technology development ===
The U.S. Laboratory serves as a testing facility for new developments in remote sensing technology, as well as innovations in computing, electronics, and hardware prototyping. It also has microgravity-enabled material production and manufacturing facilities.

The Lab also tests robotics and advanced materials to see if they can withstand the harsh microgravity environment. The results will provide valuable information for future space stations and next-generation satellites.

==== Research examples ====
===== 3D Printer =====
A 3D printer on the ISS is scheduled to produce "parts for satellites and other spacecraft, medical research components, an exercise device for Autodesk, wrenches... and parts for high school projects". Researchers believe that manufacturing large structures in space, as opposed to sending them from Earth, will broaden space development and exploration, even as far as producing habitats on the Moon and sending drones to explore other planets.

===== Cotton Sustainability =====
Researchers are studying innovative methods to increase cotton sustainability ranging from improving the plants to use less water to getting real time data from Earth-observation to farmers in order to make informed decisions that conserve water and aid in the management of field crops.

===== Bone Densitometry =====
The first X-ray machine installed on the space station, called the Bone Densitometer, allows astronauts to study osteoporosis by examining the "bone density of model organisms in space by measuring energy levels absorbed by bones via the device".
