= Rodent Research Hardware System =

NASA research platform on the International Space Station

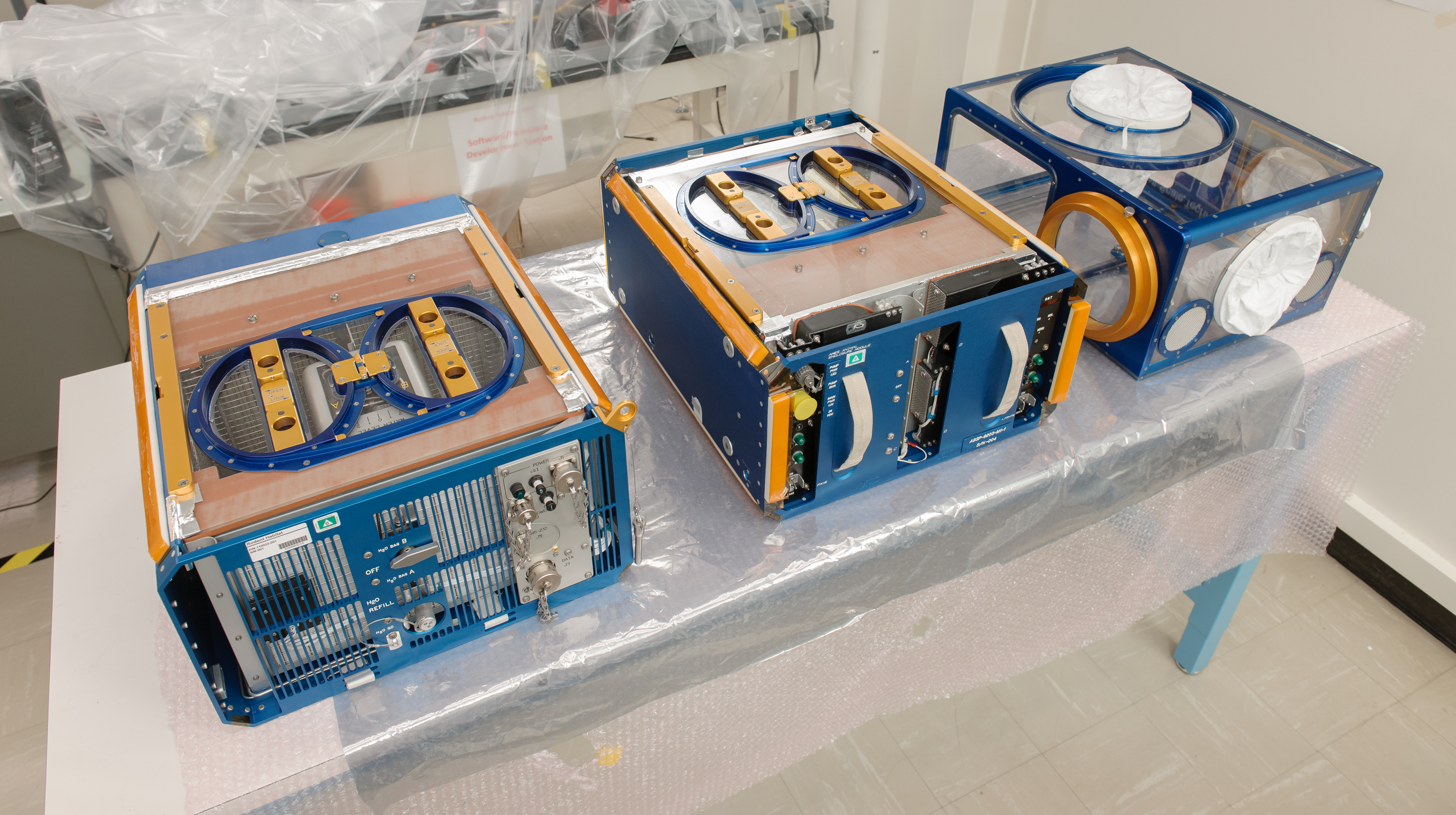
The Rodent Research Hardware System includes three modules: (Left) Habitat, (Center) Transporter, and (Right) Animal Access Unit

NASA's Rodent Research Hardware System provides a research platform aboard the International Space Station for long-duration experiments on rodents in space. Such experiments will examine how microgravity affects the rodents, providing information relevant to human spaceflight, discoveries in basic biology, and knowledge that can help treat human disease on Earth.

== Background ==
Based on the recommendations from the National Academies of Sciences, Engineering, and Medicine report Recapturing a Future for Space Exploration: Life and Physical Sciences Research for a New Era (2011). The report included a recommendation that NASA establish a rodent research facility aboard the International Space Station designated as a national laboratory “as soon as possible” to enable high-priority, long duration rodent studies. The goal was to conduct studies of durations up to 6 months. As mice and rats have life spans of at most 5 years the “studies on these rodents in space have the potential to extrapolate important implications for humans living in space well beyond six months."

The Rodent Research Hardware System was developed by scientists and engineers at NASA's Ames Research Center in Moffett Field, California. In the past short-term rodent experiments transported to space on various vehicle including the Space Shuttle. This is the first "permanent" laboratory for rodent research. The system was developed based on what was learned from the Animal Enclosure Module that flew aboard 27 Space Shuttle missions between 1983 and 2011. The first Rodent Research Hardware System was delivered to the ISS by SpaceX CRS-4.

== Design ==
The system has 4 major components. The Transporter is used to safely house the rodents while being transported from Earth to the space station. This is also referred to as the Animal Enclosure Module-Transporter(AEM-T). As the trip from Earth can take up to 10 days an Environmental Control and Life Support System(ECLSS) is required. This is provided by the Animal Enclosure Module-ECLSS(AEM-E). The Animal Access Unit provides containment while transferring of rodents between the Transporter and the Habitat; and the Habitat that provides long-term housing for rodents aboard the station. The Habitat component operate in an EXPRESS Rack facility aboard the station. Crew members will use the access module to examine the rodents closely during the study and to transfer them between habitats as needed. Each habitat module provides as many as 10 mice or six rats with all of the basics they need to live comfortably aboard the station including water, food, lighting and fresh air. Rodents easily can move around the living space by grasping grids that line the floor and walls. The modules include data downlink capability that enables monitoring of environmental conditions such as temperature. A visible light and infrared video system allows the crew in space and scientists and veterinarians on the ground to monitor behavior and overall health of the rodents on a daily basis.

== Missions ==
=== Rodent Research-1 (RR1) ===
Delivered on 21 September 2014 to the ISS by SpaceX CRS-4. Mission was a validation of the operational capabilities of the hardware to support rodent research provides valuable information applicable to future long-term space missions. Rodent Research-1 was a joint operation between NASA and CASIS. The experiments involved 20 mice; 10 NASA mice and 10 CASIS mice. This was the first time rodents were transported to the ISS aboard an uncrewed commercial vehicle. Lasting 37 days, Rodent Research-1 was the longest duration spaceflight rodent study to date conducted in a NASA facility. The Bone Densitometer was also delivered on this mission to be used in later missions.

=== Rodent Research-2 (RR2) ===
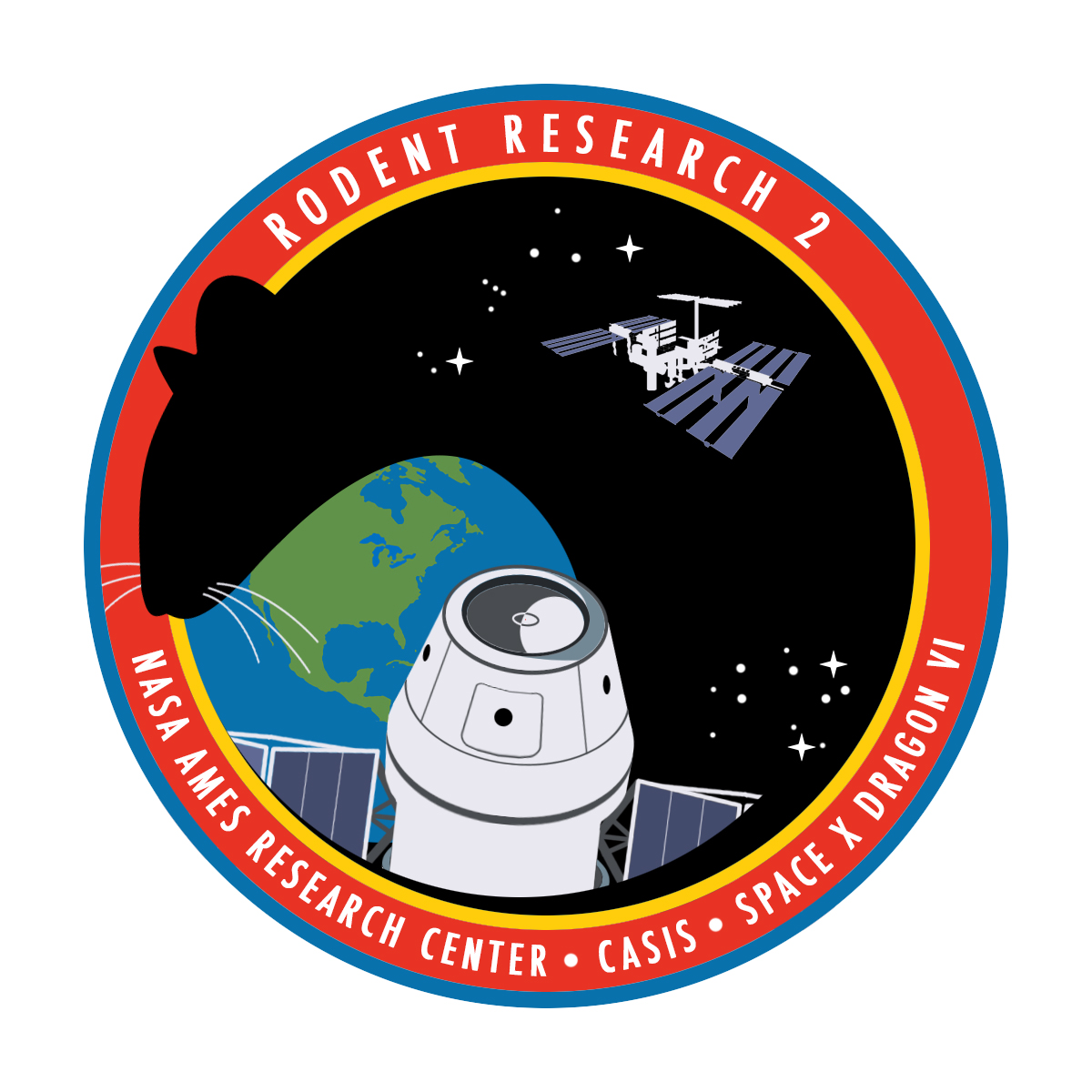
RR2 Patch

Delivered on 14 April 2015 to the ISS by SpaceX CRS-6. The research was sponsored by the Center for the Advancement of Science in Space (CASIS) and Novartis Institute for Biomedical Research. The primary objective of the research was to monitor the effects of the space environment on the musculoskeletal and neurological systems of mice as model organisms of human health and disease. In addition to the primary research focus other organ systems, including whole blood, brain, heart, lungs, kidney/adrenal glands, liver, spleen, and small intestines, were also studied for molecular and morphological changes as a function of duration of spaceflight exposure. The study included 40 mice, 20 that were flown to the ISS and 20 as controls that remained on Earth. The study lasted 37 days. The Bone Densitometer Validation experiment was used in support of RR-2.

=== Rodent Research-3 (RR3) ===
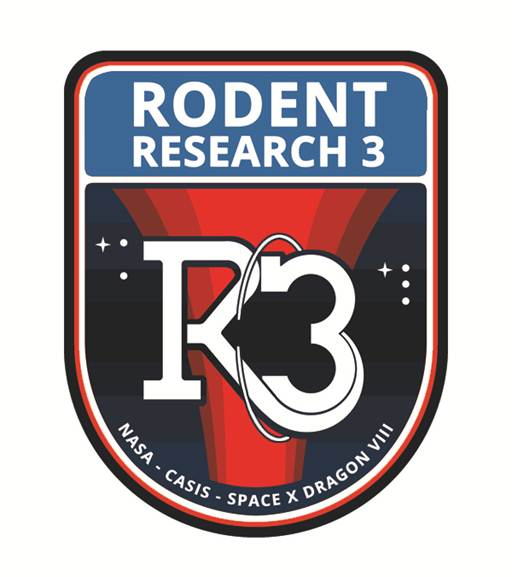
RR3 Patch

Delivered on 8 April 2016 to the ISS by SpaceX CRS-8. The research was sponsored by the International Space Station U.S. National Laboratory in partnership with Eli Lilly and Company. The primary objective was to countermeasure against muscle atrophy. The study assessed myostatin inhibition to prevent skeletal muscle atrophy and weakness in mice. Twenty mice were flown for this experiment and the study lasted 33 days. As part of the study astronauts successfully completed a functional assessment of grip strength in mice on the orbiting laboratory. This was the first time a grip strength meter has been used for rodent research on orbit, and the data gathered will be used to assess the efficacy of the anti-myostatin treatments in preventing muscle loss in space.

=== Rodent Research-4 (RR4) ===
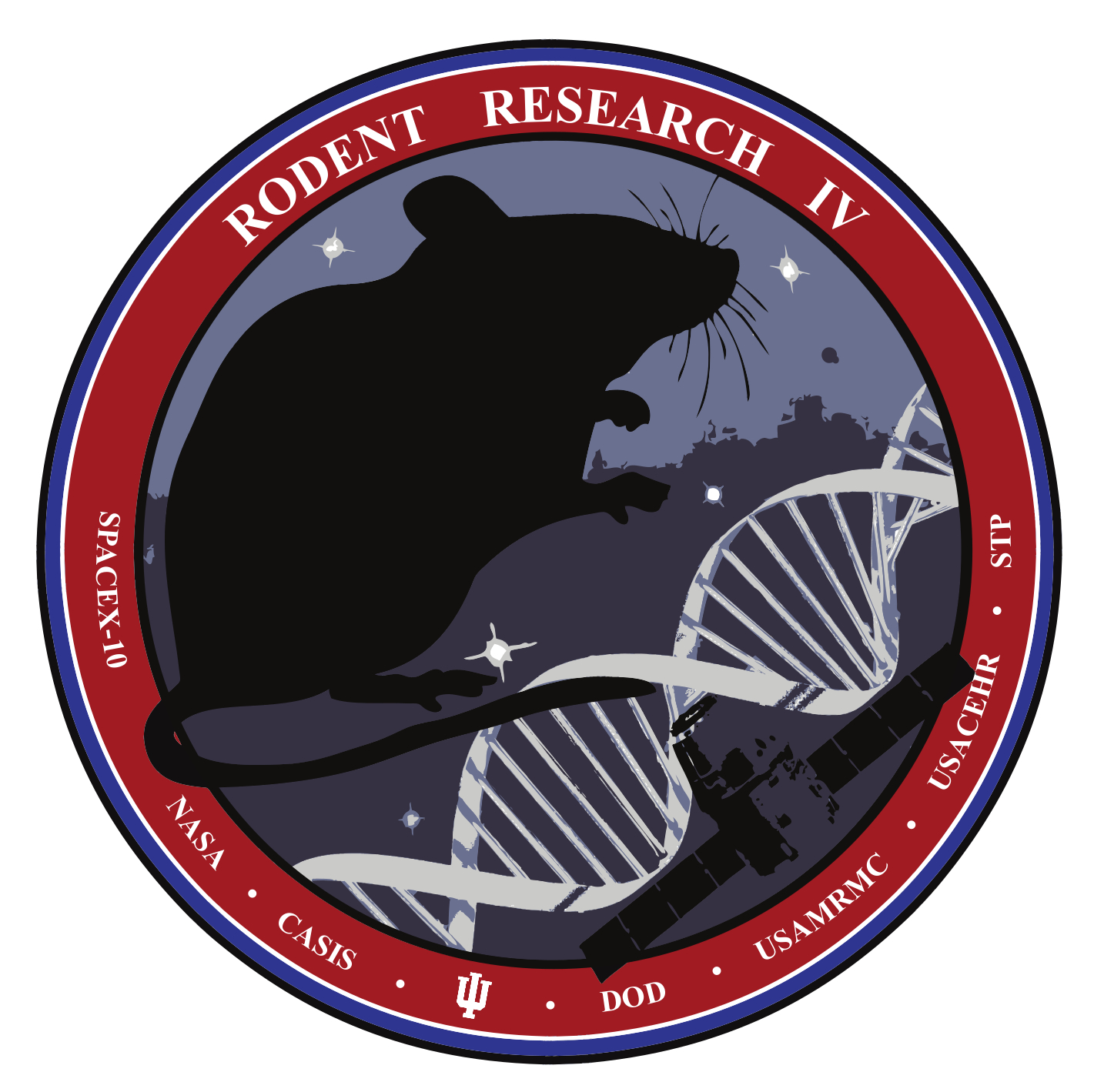
RR4 Patch

Delivered on 19 February 2017 to the ISS by SpaceX CRS-10. The research was sponsored by the United States Department of Defense (DoD) Space Test Program and the Center for the Advancement of Science in Space (CASIS), manager of the ISS National Laboratory. The primary objective of the study was to better understand bone healing and bone tissue regeneration and to study the impacts of microgravity on these processes. The study also intended to gauge certain agents capable of inducing bone healing and regeneration in spaceflight. The study lasted 28 days. NASA studies in space involving mice require housing mice at densities higher than recommended in the Guide for the Care and Use of Laboratory Animals. For this reason all previous NASA missions in which mice were co-housed, involved female mice. This spaceflight study examining bone healing, male mice are required for optimal experimentation. To ensure valid results from this first NASA study involving male mice an additional study on the housing density was done. The study included 80 mice, 40 that were flown to the ISS and 40 as controls that remained on Earth. Some of the results of this study have been published in the journal of Life Sciences in Space Research focusing on the impact of launch into space on bone fracture healing.

=== Rodent Research-5 (RR5) ===
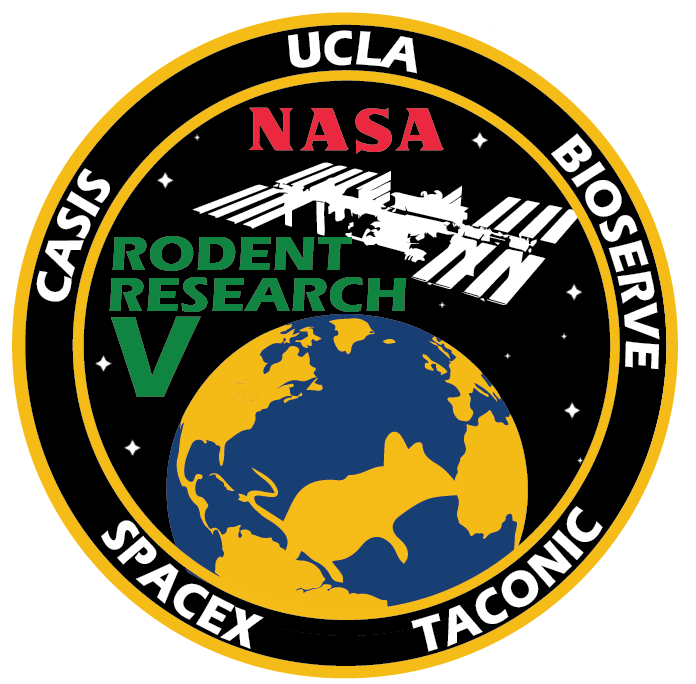
RR5 Patch

Delivered on 3 June 2017 to the ISS by SpaceX CRS-11. The research was sponsored by the Center for the Advancement of Science in Space (CASIS) in partnership with the University of California at Los Angeles. The primary objective of the study was to evaluate a new strategy to mitigate one of the negative effects of living in space (bone degradation). All the mice were periodically injected with either a control treatment or an experimental treatment that contains NELL1, a protein that when expressed can help regulate bone-remodeling. The study is based on research on NELL1 done by a group led by Dr. Chia Soo, a UCLA professor of plastic and reconstructive surgery and orthopedic surgery. The experiments involved 40 mice that were flown to the ISS. On 3 July 2017 twenty of the mice were returned to Earth live. This was the first time the Transporter unit was used to carry mice from the ISS back to Earth alive. The entire study lasted 30 days.

=== Rodent Research-9 (RR9) ===
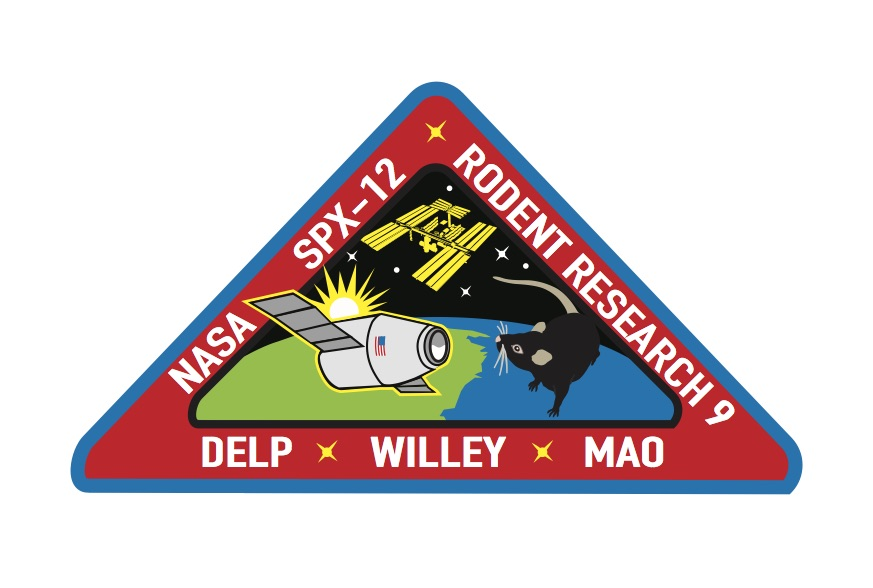
RR9 Patch

Delivered on 14 August 2017 to the ISS by SpaceX CRS-12. The research was sponsored by the National Aeronautics and Space Administration's Space Life and Physical Sciences program. This is the first Rodent Research mission that is dedicated to NASA-sponsored science experiments. Previous missions on the ISS involved commercial and other government agency experiments selected by the Center for Advancement of Science in Space (CASIS). The mission consisted of three separate experiments led by principal investigators Michael Delp, Xiao Wen Mao, and Jeffrey Willey. Delp's investigation was designed to study the effects of long duration spaceflight on fluid shifts and increased fluid pressures in the head, Mao's was to examine the impact of spaceflight on the vessels that supply blood to the eyes, and Willey's was designed to study the extent of knee and hip joint degradation caused by prolonged exposure to weightlessness. The flight lasted 33 days.

=== Rodent Research-6 (RR6) ===
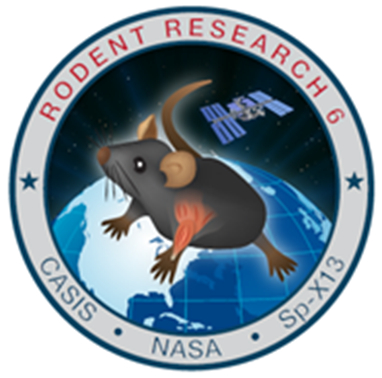
RR6 Patch

Delivered on 15 December 2017 to the ISS by SpaceX CRS-13. The research was sponsored by the Center for the Advancement of Science in Space (CASIS) in partnership with Novartis and NanoMedical Systems. The primary objective of the study was to evaluate a novel therapeutic drug delivery chip in microgravity. The nanochannel drug delivery chip delivered the drug formoterol, used in the management of asthma and other medical conditions, to achieve a constant and reliable dosage. The experiments involved 40 mice that were flown to the ISS. On 13 January 2018 twenty of the mice were returned to Earth alive. The remaining 20 mice were studied for and additional 30 days. The study lasted 60 days.

=== Rodent Research-7 (RR7) ===
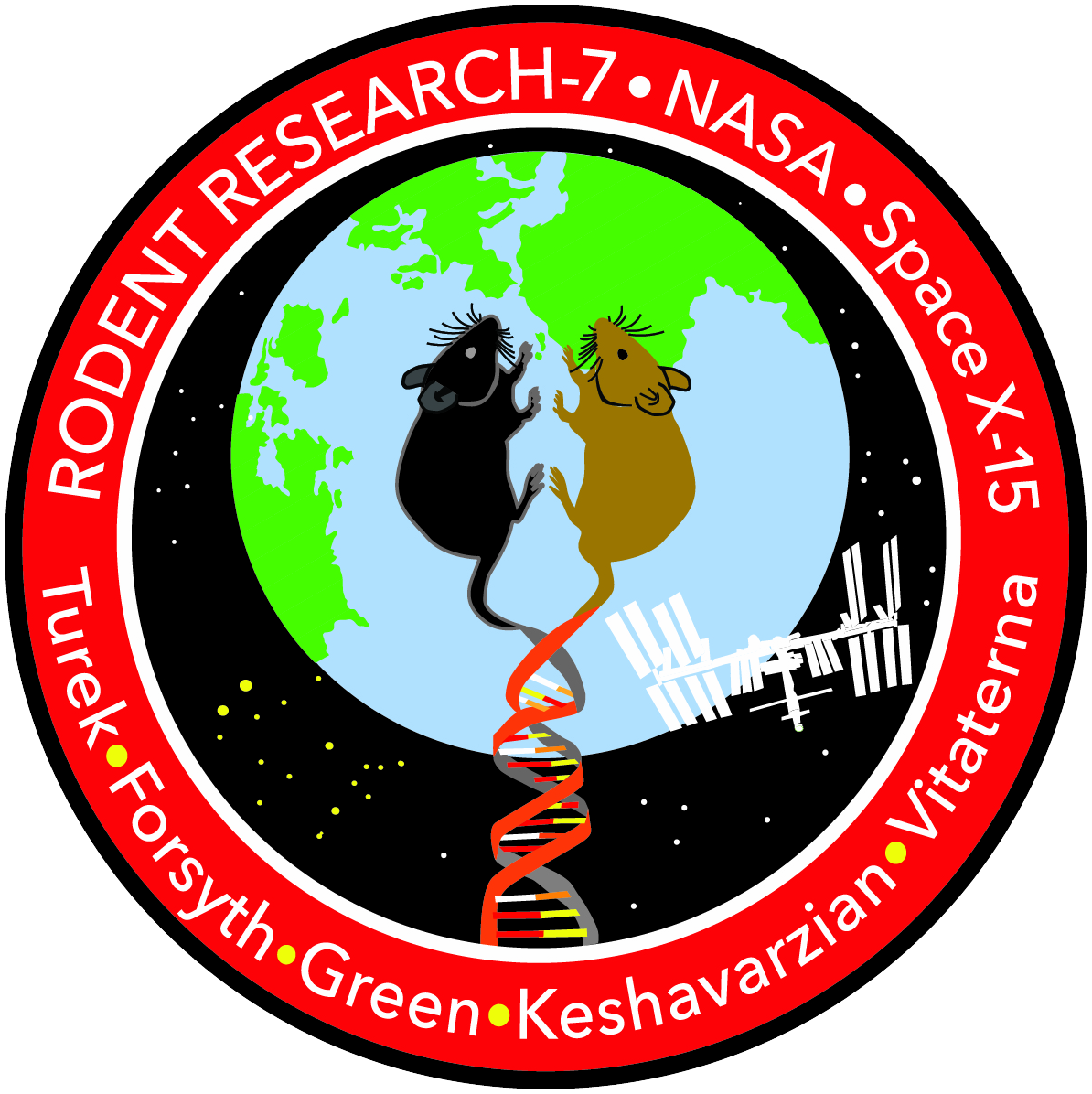
RR7 Patch

Delivered on 29 June 2018 to the ISS by SpaceX CRS-15. The research was the second mission sponsored by the National Aeronautics and Space Administration's Space Life and Physical Sciences program. The primary objective of the study was to study the impact of the space environment on the gut microbiota of mice. The importance of this study is that disruption of the normal microbiota communities in the digestive tract has been linked to multiple health problems: including the intestinal, immune, mental, and metabolic health. The experiments involved 20 mice that were flown to the ISS. On 3 August 2018 ten of the mice were returned to Earth alive. The entire study lasted 77 days.

=== Rodent Research-8 (RR8) ===
Delivered on 8 December 2018 to the ISS by SpaceX CRS-16. Strangely it did not appear on the list of science payloads for the mission. The experiment was blamed for delaying the launch due to mold being discovered on the food for the mice. The research is sponsored by the National Laboratory in partnership with Center for the Advancement of Science in Space (CASIS) and Taconic Biosciences. The primary objective of the study is to study the physiology of aging and the effect of age on disease progression using groups of young and old mice. The study will consist of 2 groups of 20 mice each. Half of each group will be 10–16 weeks old (young group), the other half will be 30–52 weeks old (old group). Half of each group will be returned to Earth alive after about 30 days. The remaining mice will be euthanized and cryogenically preserved for study back on Earth. This is also been designated as Rodent Research Reference Mission-1 (RRR-1). For this mission the samples gathered will be made available for other researchers through a proposals submitted to CASIS.

=== Rodent Research-10 (RR10) ===
This mission is scheduled to fly to the ISS on SpaceX CRS-17. The research is sponsored by NASA Research Office - Space Life and Physical Sciences. The primary objective of the study is to examine the CDKN1a/p21 pathway and its role in the arresting bone regeneration in microgravity. The study consisted of 20 mice, 10 of are transgenic CDKN1a/p21-Null mice. The study is expected to last up to 35 days.

=== Rodent Research-11 (RR11) ===
This mission is scheduled to fly to the ISS on SpaceX CRS-17. The research was sponsored by NASA Research Office - Space Life and Physical Sciences. The primary objective of the study is to study how MicroRNA related to vascular health in microgravity. The study consisted of 20 mice to be flown to the ISS and 20 mice that remained on the ground as controls. After approximately 30 days, the 20 mice on the ISS will be returned alive.
