= UNITE (satellite) =

American scientific research satellite

- Mission type: Ionospheric research
- Operator: University of Southern Indiana
- COSPAR ID: 1998-067PX
- SATCAT no.: 44031
- Mission duration: 2 years, 8 months and 21 days

Spacecraft properties
- Spacecraft type: 3U CubeSat
- Launch mass: 4 kg (8.8 lb)
- Dimensions: 10 cm (4 in) x 10 cm (4 in) x 30 cm (12 in)

Start of mission
- Launch date: 5 December 2018 UTC
- Rocket: Falcon 9 FT, CRS-16
- Launch site: Cape Canaveral Air Force Station
- Contractor: SpaceX

End of mission
- Decay date: 21 October 2021

Orbital parameters
- Reference system: Geocentric
- Regime: Low Earth

UNITE (Undergraduate Nano Ionospheric Temperature Explorer) was a CubeSat nanosatellite developed by the University of Southern Indiana. The project was funded by NASA's Undergraduate Student Instrument Project and primarily designed and built by students. It was launched into space on 5 December 2018 and deployed into its orbit from the International Space Station on 31 January 2019. Its mission included measuring plasma in the lower ionosphere and monitoring the drag and temperature of the satellite itself.

UNITE reentered the atmosphere on 21 October 2021, after 994 days in orbit.
