= Global Ecosystem Dynamics Investigation =

Scientific space mission

Global Ecosystem Dynamics Investigation lidar (GEDI)
- Operator: NASA
- Manufacturer: Goddard Space Flight Center
- Instrument type: LIDAR
- Function: 3D structure of forests
- Mission duration: 2 years
- Website: science.nasa.gov/missions/gedi/

Host spacecraft
- Spacecraft: International Space Station
- Launch date: 5 December 2018
- Rocket: Falcon 9 Block 5
- Launch site: Cape Canaveral SLC-40

Global Ecosystem Dynamics Investigation (GEDI, pronounced /ˈdʒɛdaɪ/) is a LiDAR altimeter mission by NASA to measure how deforestation has contributed to atmospheric CO_{2} concentrations. A full-waveform LiDAR was attached to the International Space Station to provide the first global, high-resolution observations of forest vertical structure. This will allow scientists to map habitats and biomass, particularly in the tropics, providing detail on the Earth's carbon cycle. Although GEDI has been originally developed to monitor biomass and carbon cycle, other potentials have been also investigated such as inland water level monitoring and DSM generation.

The Principal Investigator is Ralph Dubayah, at the University of Maryland. The Deputy Principal Investigator & Instrument Scientist is J. Bryan Blair at NASA's Goddard Space Flight Center.

== Overview ==
GEDI was competitively selected as a NASA Earth Ventures Instrument (EVI) mission in 2014. Cost-capped at $94 M, GEDI is led by the University of Maryland in collaboration with NASA Goddard Space Flight Center.

Climate change is closely tied to that of the carbon cycle. GEDI produces high resolution laser ranging observations of the 3D structure of the forests of Earth, which will provide answers to how deforestation has contributed to atmospheric CO_{2} concentrations, how much carbon forests will absorb in the future, and how habitat degradation will affect global biodiversity and the water cycle. This, in turn, is also of value for weather forecasting, forest management, glacier and snowpack monitoring. Overall, GEDI will help to better understand how the Earth behaves as a living system.

GEDI's LIDAR system provides precise geolocated elevation data that drastically improve global Digital Elevation Models (DEMs). Owing to the vast number of data points that GEDI is capable of collecting it will provide a stronger baseline for DEMs and remove more system errors compared to ICESat.

It launched on 5 December 2018 on board a Falcon 9 and it is part of the SpaceX CRS-16 mission. It was mounted on the Japanese Experiment Module - Exposed Facility (JEM-EF) Kibo module for a two-year mission. After three month, GEDI started collecting data for scientific use on March 25, 2019. The mission is being led by Professor Ralph Dubayah of the University of Maryland. Once reaching the end of its two-year mission, GEDI will be removed from the JEM-EF and loaded into another Dragon Capsule trunk for disposal.

== Instrument ==
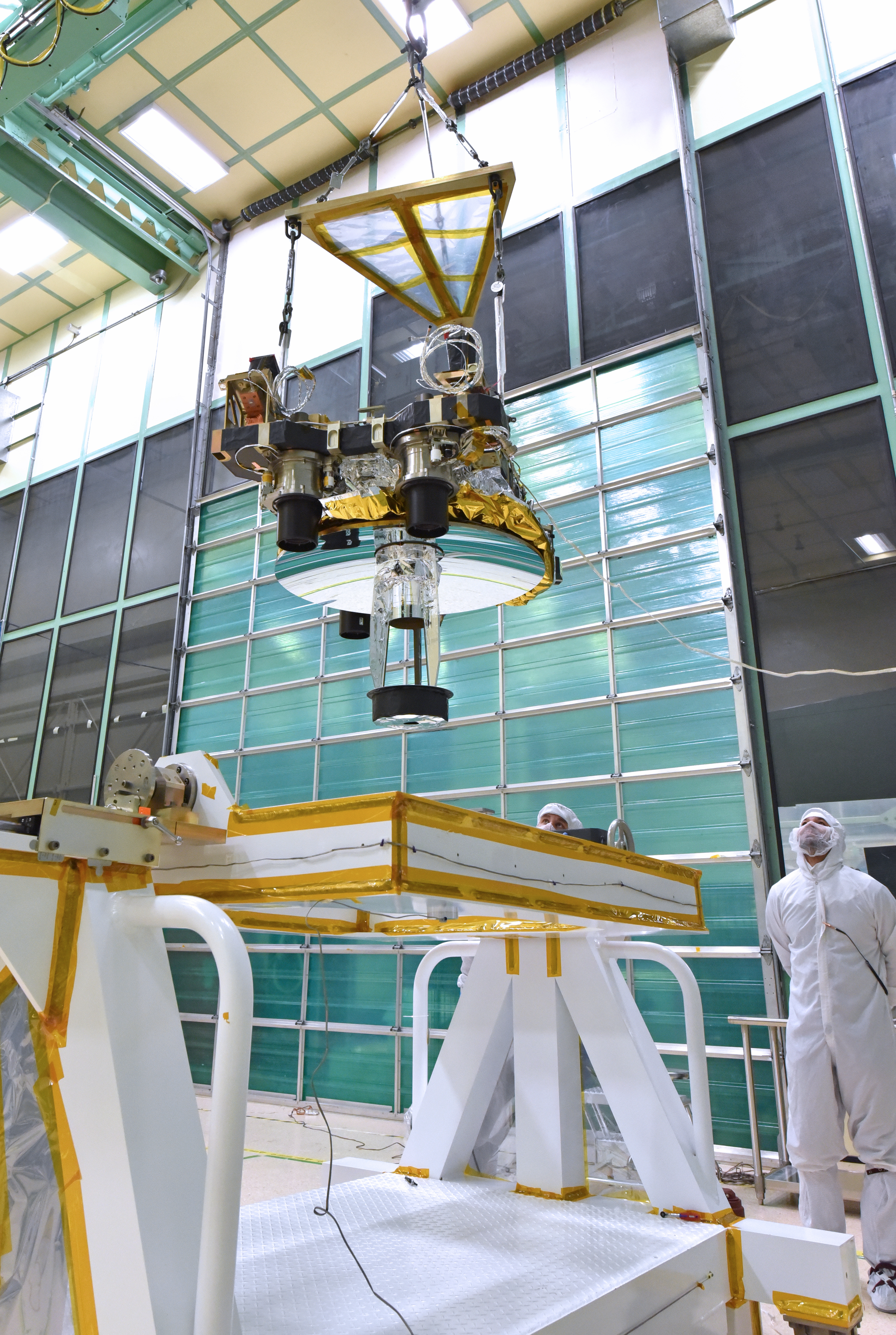
Optical Bench during integration activities inside the Spacecraft Checkout and Integration Area (SCA) clean room at Goddard Space Flight Center

The GEDI instrument is a geodetic-class, light detection and ranging (Lidar) laser system consisting of three lasers that produce eight parallel tracks of observations. Each laser fires 242 times per second and illuminates a 25 m spot (a footprint) on the surface over which 3D structure is measured. Each footprint is separated by 60 m along track, with an across-track distance of about 600 m between each of the eight tracks. GEDI is expected to produce about 10 billion cloud-free observations during its nominal 24-month mission length.

Using an 80 cm telescope attached to the bottom of the instrument, GEDI will be able to receive the pulses of light that bounce back from the Earth' surface and collect information on the 3D structure of the area in question. Upon the optical bench, the instrument contains three Beam Dither Units (BDU), three beam expanders, three star trackers, and three HOMER lasers. The three HOMER lasers built and installed on GEDI were built by D. Barry Coyle, Furqan L. Chiragh, and Erich A. Frese.

The GEDI instrumentation is designed to collect data between 51.6° N latitude and 51.6° S latitude. Within this area, GEDI gathers data from approximately four percent of the Earth's surface, including both tropical and temperate forests.

The LIDAR system can only operate effectively over relatively cloud free areas. Dense cloud cover blocks the laser pulses and prevents accurate measurements.

GEDI uses an active across-track pointing system in order to help show area that is not normally covered due to the International Space Station's orbit pattern. These occur because the ISS is not maintained in a repeating orbit and can get stuck in orbital resonances that essentially repeat orbital tracks and result in large coverage gaps.
