= Cygnus NG-10 =

Late 2018 cargo mission to the ISS

NG-10
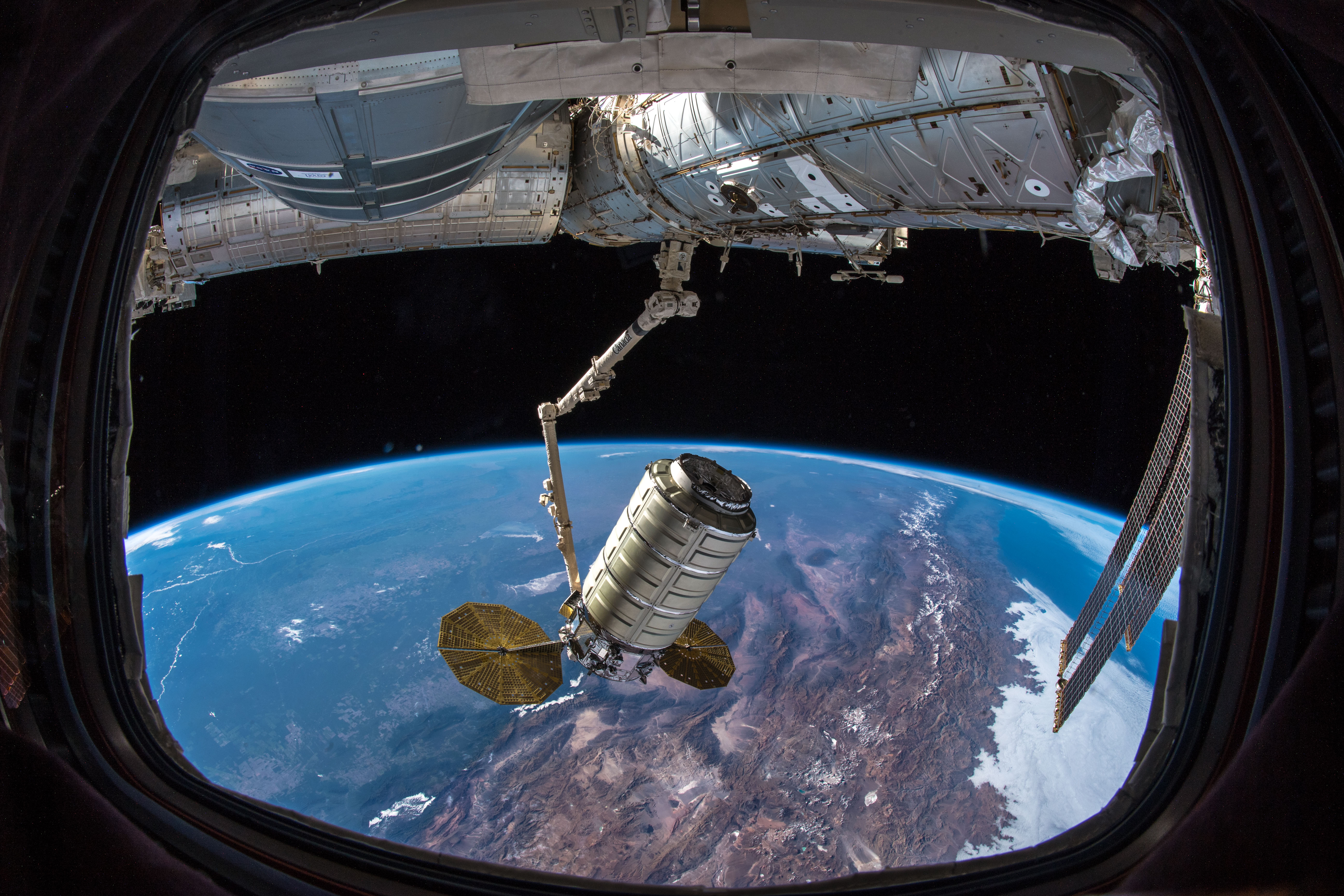
- Canadarm2 grapples the S.S. John Young
- Names: CRS NG-10; CRS OA-10E (2015–2018)
- Mission type: ISS resupply
- Operator: Northrop Grumman
- COSPAR ID: 2018-092A
- SATCAT no.: 43704
- Mission duration: 100 days, 4 minutes

Spacecraft properties
- Spacecraft: S.S. John Young
- Spacecraft type: Enhanced Cygnus
- Manufacturer: Northrop Grumman; Thales Alenia Space

Start of mission
- Launch date: 17 November 2018, 09:01:31 UTC (4:01:31 am EST)
- Rocket: Antares 230
- Launch site: MARS, Pad 0A

End of mission
- Disposal: Deorbited
- Decay date: 25 February 2019, 09:05 UTC

Orbital parameters
- Reference system: Geocentric orbit
- Regime: Low Earth orbit
- Inclination: 51.66°

Berthing at ISS
- Berthing port: Unity nadir
- RMS capture: 19 November 2018, 10:28 UTC
- Berthing date: 19 November 2018, 12:31 UTC
- Unberthing date: 8 February 2019, 14:37 UTC
- RMS release: 8 February 2019, 16:16 UTC
- Time berthed: 81 days, 3 hours, 45 minutes

Cargo
- Mass: 3,350 kg (7,390 lb)
- Pressurised: 3,273 kg (7,216 lb)
- Unpressurised: 77 kg (170 lb)
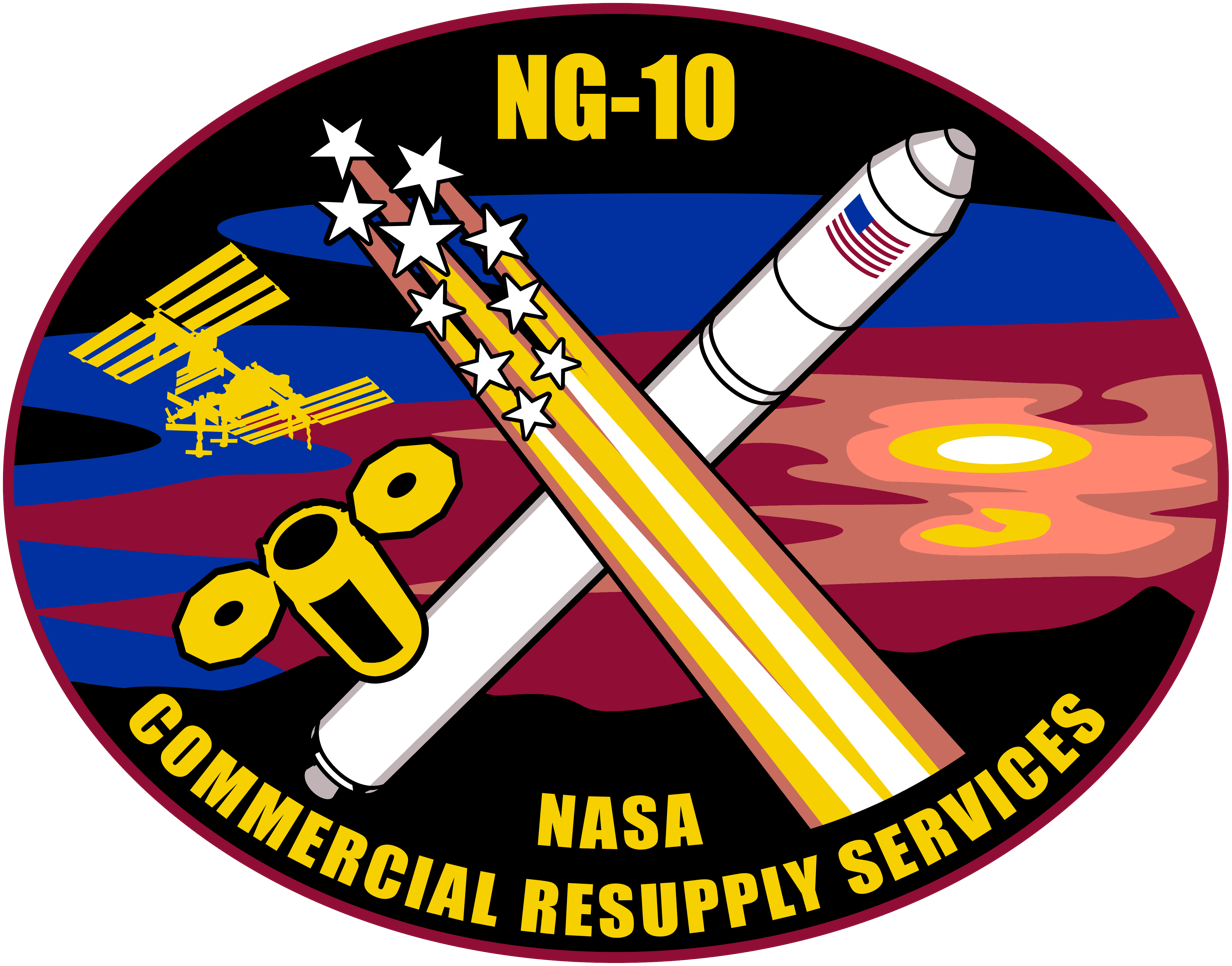
- NASA insignia Commercial Resupply Services Cygnus flights

NG-10, previously known as OA-10E, was the eleventh flight of the Northrop Grumman uncrewed resupply spacecraft Cygnus and its tenth flight to the International Space Station under the Commercial Resupply Services (CRS-1) contract with NASA. The mission launched on 17 November 2018, at 09:01:31 UTC. This particular mission was part of an extension of the initial CRS contract that enables NASA to cover the ISS resupply needs until the Commercial Resupply Services-2 (CRS-2) contract enters in effect.

Orbital ATK and NASA jointly developed a new space transportation system to provide commercial cargo resupply services to the International Space Station (ISS). Under the Commercial Orbital Transportation System (COTS) program, then Orbital Sciences designed and built Antares, a medium-class launch vehicle; Cygnus, an advanced maneuvering spacecraft, and a Pressurized Cargo Module which is provided by Orbital's industrial partner Thales Alenia Space. Northrop Grumman purchased Orbital ATK in June 2018, and it was renamed Northrop Grumman Innovation Systems.

== History ==
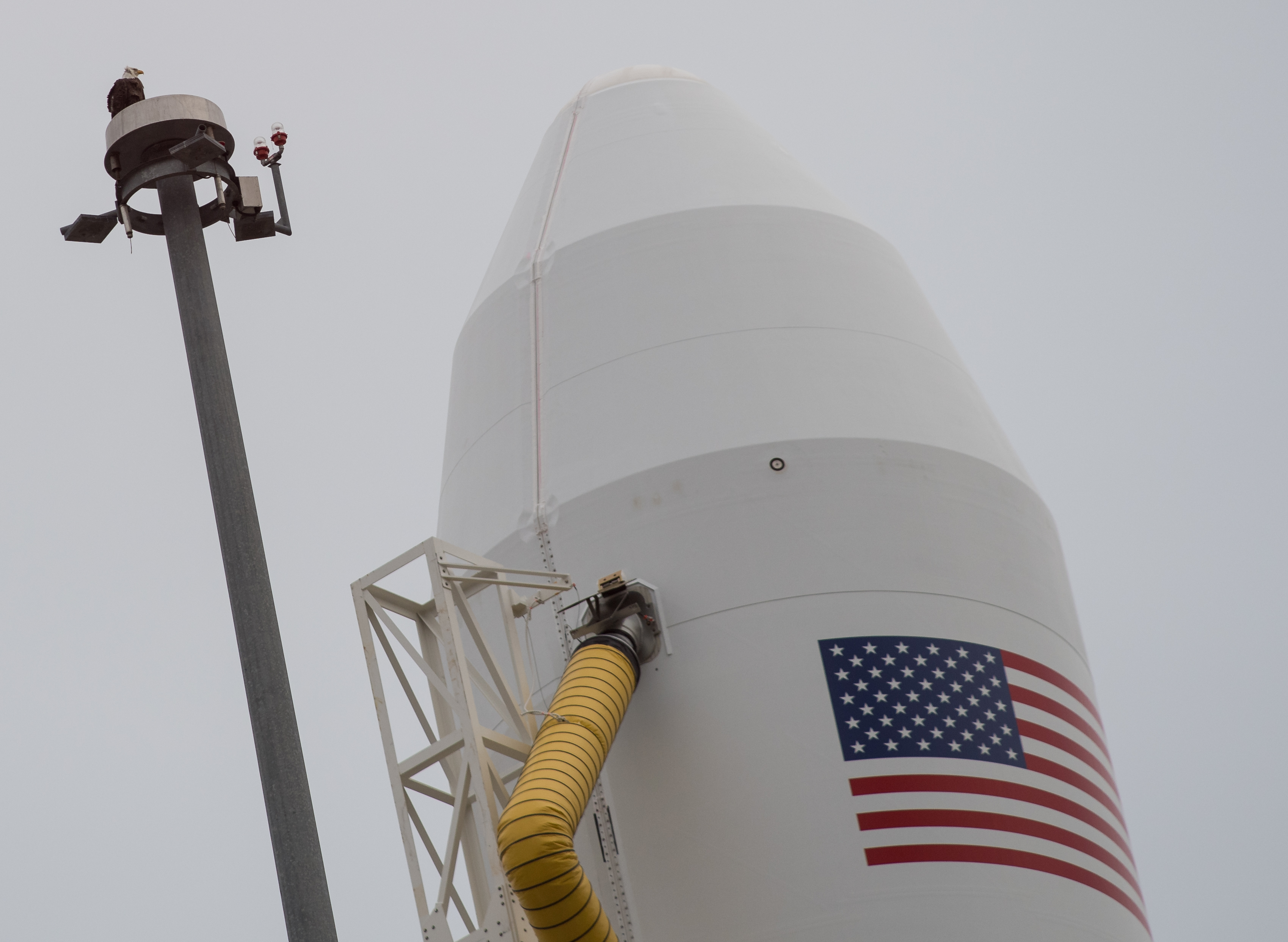
A bald eagle is seen atop a lightning tower next to the Northrop Grumman Antares rocket with, Cygnus spacecraft on board, at Pad-0A, 14 November 2018 at NASA's Wallops Flight Facility in Virginia.

The COTS demonstration mission was successfully conducted in September 2013, and Orbital commenced operational ISS cargo missions under the Commercial Resupply Service (CRS) program with two missions in 2014. Regrettably, the third operational mission, Cygnus CRS Orb-3, resulted was not successful due to spectacular Antares failure during launch. The company decided to discontinue the Antares 100 series and accelerate the introduction of a new propulsion. The Antares system was upgraded with newly built RD-181 first-stage engines to provide greater payload performance and increased reliability.

In the meantime, the company had contracted with United Launch Alliance for an Atlas V launch of Cygnus CRS OA-4 in late 2015 from Cape Canaveral, Florida, with a second Atlas V Cygnus launch in 2016. The company had planned Cygnus missions for the first (CRS OA-5), second (CRS OA-6) and fourth quarters (CRS OA-7) of 2016. Two of which flew on the new Antares 230 and one on the aforementioned second Atlas V. These three missions enabled Orbital ATK to cover their initial CRS contracted payload obligation. This particular mission, known as NG-10, is part of an extension program that will enable NASA to cover the ISS resupply needs until the Commercial Resupply Services 2 contract enters in effect, and thus the E indicates that it actually is an extension above the originally contracted payload transport.

Production and integration of Cygnus spacecraft is performed in Dulles, Virginia. The Cygnus service module is mated with the pressurized cargo module at the launch site, and mission operations are conducted from control centers in Dulles, Virginia and Houston, Texas.

== Spacecraft ==
This is the second-to-last of the eleven flights by Northrop Grumman under the Commercial Resupply Services contract with NASA, and it's considered an extension over the originally contracted flights. This will be the seventh flight of the Enhanced sized Cygnus PCM.

In an Orbital ATK tradition, this Cygnus spacecraft was named S.S. John Young. Young was the only person to fly twice on each of three NASA programs which included Gemini, Apollo, and the Space Shuttle. John Young died on 5 January 2018 at the age of 87.

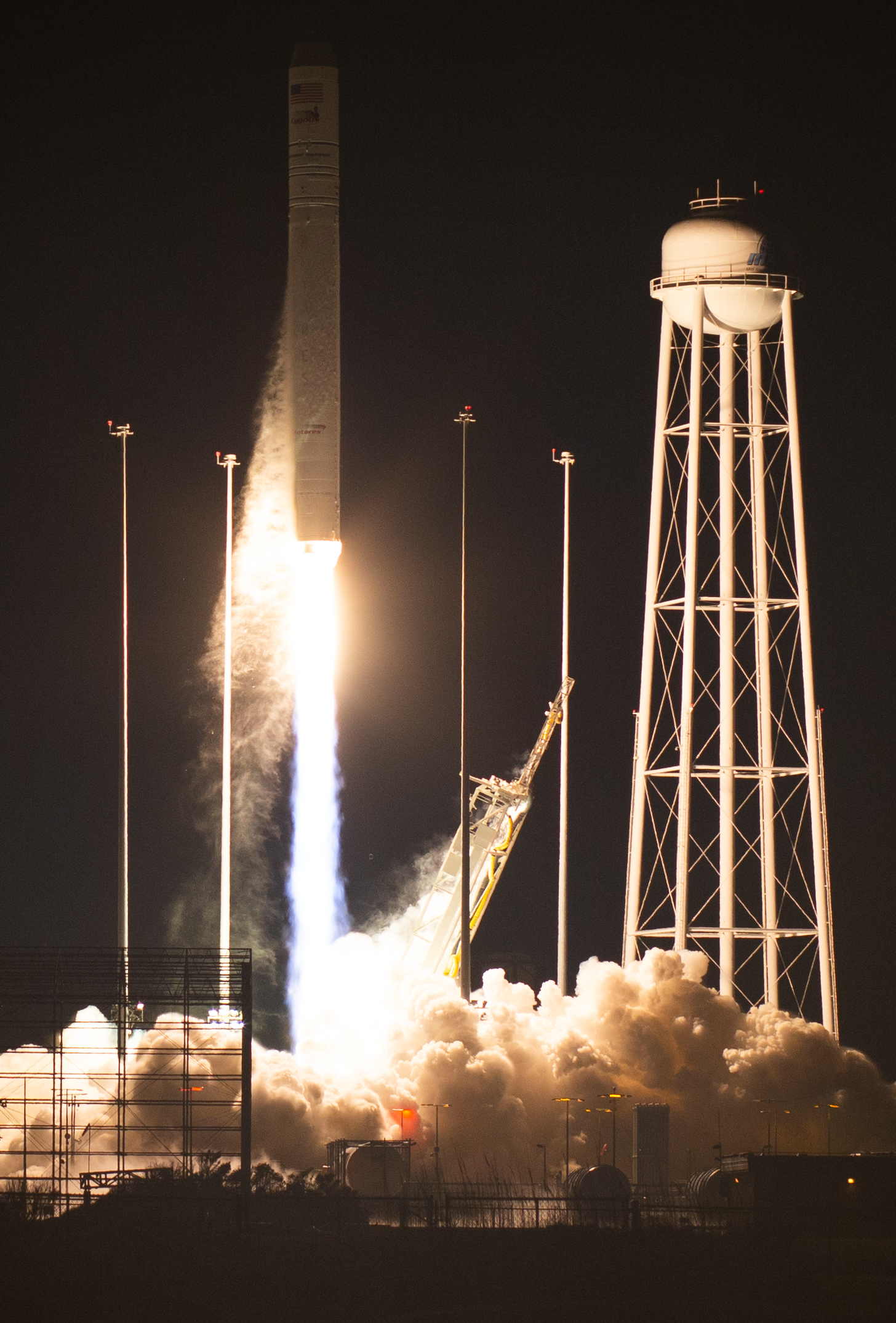
Northrop Grumman launches Cygnus NG-10

== Manifest ==
Total weight of cargo: 3,350 kg (7,390 lb).

- Crew supplies: 1,141 kg (2,515 lb)
- Science investigations: 1,044 kg (2,302 lb)
- Spacewalk equipment: 31 kg (68 lb)
- Vehicle hardware: 942 kg (2,077 lb)
- Computer resources: 115 kg (254 lb)

SEOPS Slingshot Deployer System Cygnus NG-10 is the first mission to fly this Cubesat deployment system. The system and its Cubesats arrived at ISS on SpaceX CRS-16 and then installed by Expedition 58 on Cygnus NG-10 while berthed to ISS.

After Cygnus leaves the station, the cargo craft will navigate to approximately 500 km (310 mi) above the Earth, approximately 100 km (62 mi) higher than the space station's orbit. Slingshot will deploy two satellites (David and Goliath II Quantum Radar, both launched on board of the previous Dragon CRS-16 mission), that are expected to stay in orbit at least two (2) years. In addition, a mounted payload will test SlingShot's capability to host fixed payloads for an extended period, where the payload uses Cygnus’ power, attitude control and communication capabilities.

After Cubesat deployment and conclusion of attached experiments, Northrop Grumman controllers commanded the spacecraft to a destructive re-entry over the South Pacific Ocean on 25 February 2019.

== Launch operations ==
After Northrop Grumman purchased Orbital ATK in June 2018, the mission was changed from CRS OA-10E to NG-10. The Antares rocket was built and processed in the Horizontal Integration Facility (HIF) over the course of six months. The rocket was rolled out to MARS pad 0A where it was originally planned to launch 15 November 2018 but was twice delayed due to inclement weather and successfully launched on 17 November 2018.

=== Launch attempt summary ===
Note: Times are local to the launch site (Eastern Standard Time).

Attempt	Planned	Result	Turnaround	Reason	Decision point	Weather go (%)	Notes
1	15 Nov 2018, 4:49:38 am	Scrubbed	—	Weather	14 Nov 2018, 11:00 am	10	
2	16 Nov 2018, 4:23:55 am	Scrubbed	0 days 23 hours 34 minutes	Weather	15 Nov 2018, 11:10 am	45	
3	17 Nov 2018, 4:01:31 am	Success	0 days 23 hours 38 minutes			95	

== See also ==
- Uncrewed spaceflights to the International Space Station
