= SpaceX CRS-16 =

2018 American resupply spaceflight to the ISS

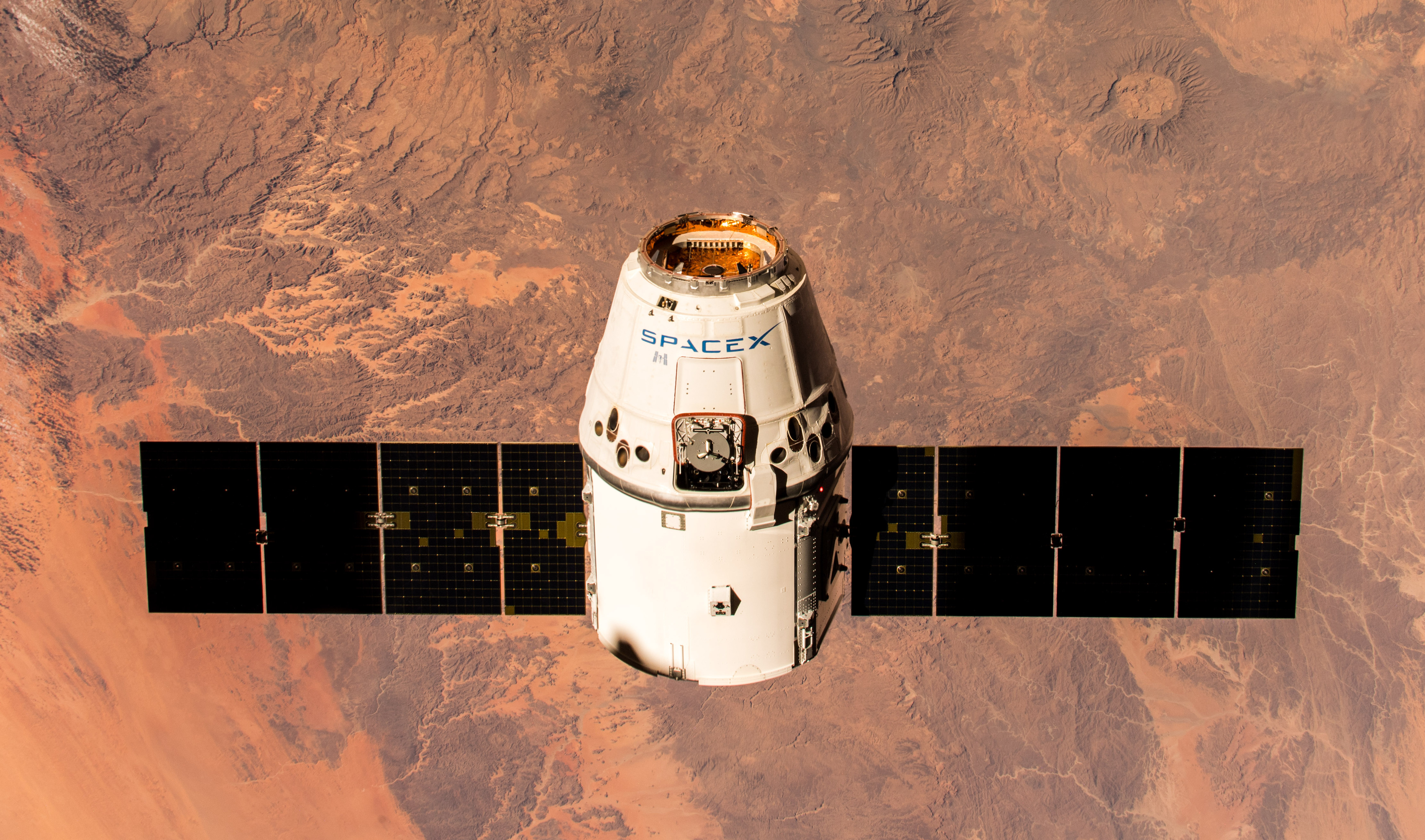
- CRS-16 Dragon approaching the ISS
- Names: SpX-16
- Mission type: ISS resupply
- Operator: SpaceX
- COSPAR ID: 2018-101A
- SATCAT no.: 43827
- Mission duration: 39 days, 10 hours, 54 minutes

Spacecraft properties
- Spacecraft: Dragon 1 C112
- Spacecraft type: Dragon 1
- Manufacturer: SpaceX
- Dry mass: 4,200 kg (9,300 lb)
- Dimensions: Height: 6.1 m (20 ft); Diameter: 3.7 m (12 ft)

Start of mission
- Launch date: 5 December 2018, 18:16:00 UTC
- Rocket: Falcon 9 Block 5 (B1050)
- Launch site: Cape Canaveral, SLC-40

End of mission
- Disposal: Recovered
- Landing date: 14 January 2019, 05:10 UTC
- Landing site: Pacific Ocean off Baja California

Orbital parameters
- Reference system: Geocentric orbit
- Regime: Low Earth orbit
- Inclination: 51.6°

Berthing at ISS
- Berthing port: Harmony nadir
- RMS capture: 8 December 2018, 12:21 UTC
- Berthing date: 8 December 2018, 15:36 UTC
- Unberthing date: 13 January 2019, 20:00 UTC
- RMS release: 13 January 2019, 23:33 UTC
- Time berthed: 36 days, 4 hours, 24 minutes

Cargo
- Mass: 2,573 kg (5,672 lb)
- Pressurised: 1,598 kg (3,523 lb)
- Unpressurised: 975 kg (2,150 lb)
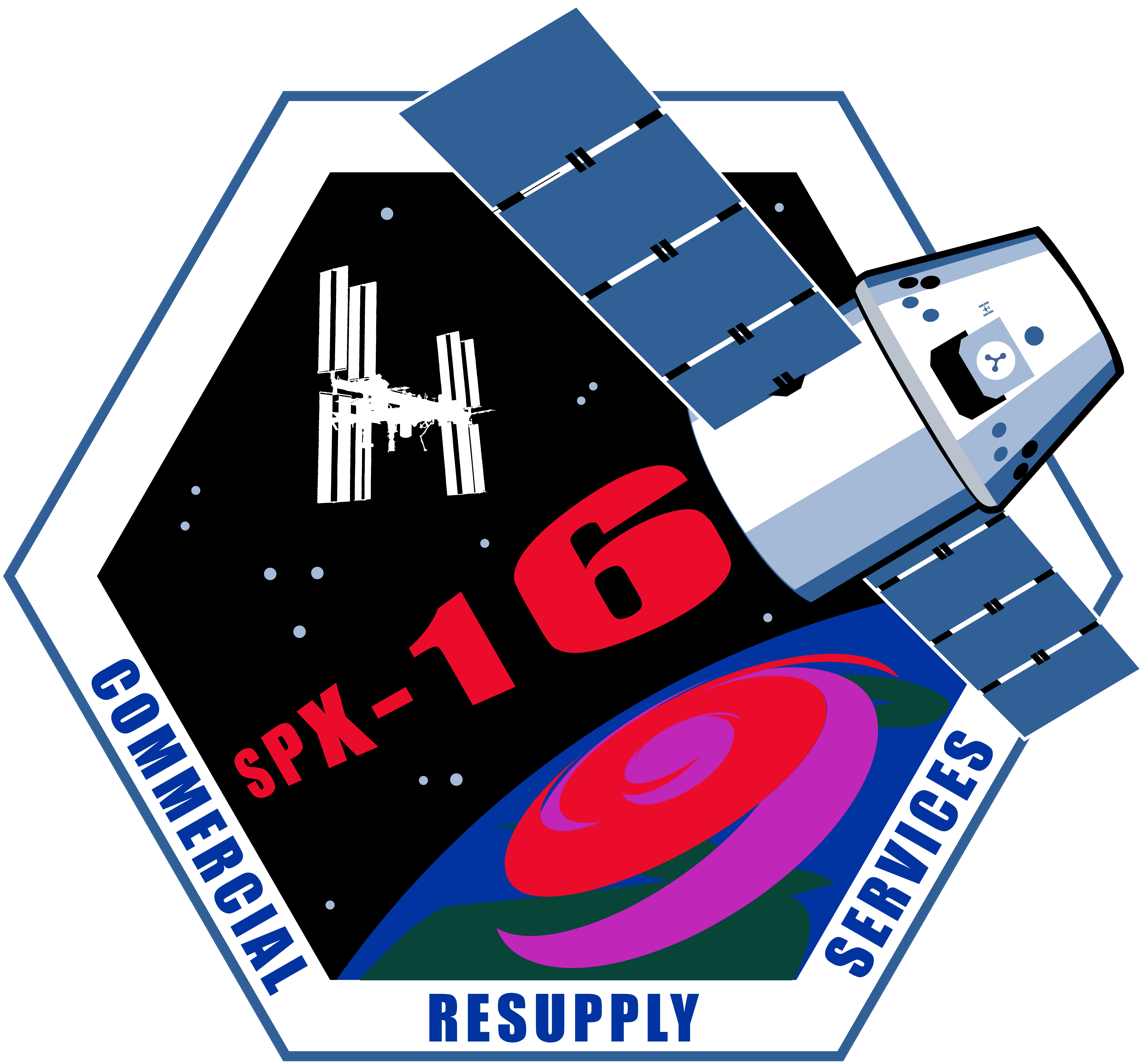
- NASA SpX-16 mission patch Commercial Resupply Services Cargo Dragon

SpaceX CRS-16, also known as SpX-16, was a Commercial Resupply Service mission to the International Space Station launched on 5 December 2018 aboard a Falcon 9 launch vehicle. The mission was contracted by NASA and is flown by SpaceX.

This CRS mission was the first to be launched by the Falcon 9 Block 5. It carried the Global Ecosystem Dynamics Investigation (GEDI) lidar and the Robotic Refueling Mission 3 (RRM3) experiment as external payloads.

== Launch ==
In February 2016, it was announced that NASA had awarded a contract extension to SpaceX for five additional CRS missions (CRS-16 to CRS-20). In June 2016, a NASA Inspector General report had this mission manifested in August 2018, but it was later delayed to 29 November 2018, 4 December 2018, and 5 December 2018.

The first stage booster B1050.1 experienced a grid fin hydraulic pump stall on re-entry. This caused the first stage to go into a roll after the re-entry burn. It failed to reach Landing Zone 1, but recovered enough to achieve a water landing off Cape Canaveral. Shortly after the landing, Elon Musk, CEO of SpaceX, stated the booster appeared to be undamaged and was being recovered. After recovering the booster, it was found to be unable to fly again, and was scrapped for parts.

On 13 January 2019, Dragon was released from ISS at 23:33 UTC and deorbited, splashing down in the Pacific Ocean approximately 5 hours later on 14 January 2019 at 05:10 UTC, returning more than 2,500 kg (5,500 lb) of cargo to Earth.

== Payload ==
NASA had contracted for the CRS-16 mission from SpaceX and therefore determined the primary payload, date/time of launch, and orbital parameters for the Dragon space capsule. CRS-16 carried a total of 2,573 kg (5,672 lb) of material into orbit. This included 1,598 kg (3,523 lb) of pressurised cargo with packaging bound for the International Space Station, and 975 kg (2,150 lb) of unpressurised cargo composed of two external station experiments: the Global Ecosystem Dynamics Investigation (GEDI) lidar and the Robotic Refueling Mission 3. Forty mice also flew with the payload in an experiment called Rodent Research-8 (RR-8).

The CRS-16 mission also carried a pair of CubeSats originally planned to launch aboard the Cygnus NG-10 International Space Station (ISS) cargo resupply mission, but which were deferred. These included the UNITE CubeSat from the University of Southern Indiana and the TechEdSat-8 CubeSat from NASA's Ames Research Center.

The following is a breakdown of cargo bound for the ISS:

- Crew supplies: 304 kg (670 lb)
- Science investigations: 1,037 kg (2,286 lb)
  - Rodent Research-8 (RR-8)
  - Molecular Muscle Experiment (MME)
  - Growth of Large, Perfect Protein Crystals for Neutron Crystallography (Perfect Crystals)
- Spacewalk equipment: 15 kg (33 lb)
- Vehicle hardware: 191 kg (421 lb)
- Computer resources: 40 kg (88 lb)
- Russian hardware: 11 kg (24 lb)
- External payloads:
  - Global Ecosystem Dynamics Investigation (GEDI): ≈500 kg (1,100 lb)
  - Robotic Refueling Mission 3 (RRM3)

== Gallery ==
SpaceX CRS-16
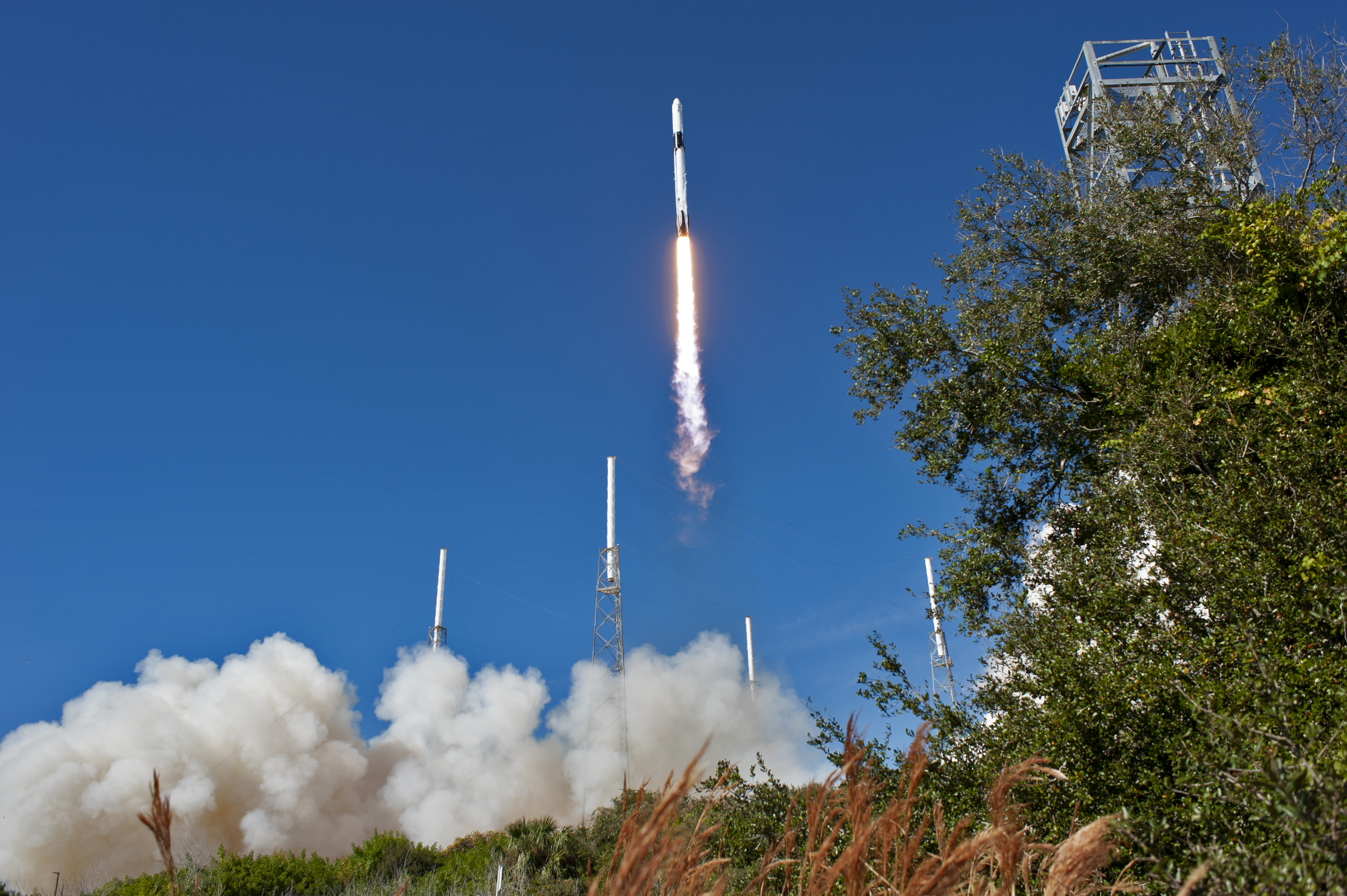
Launch of CRS-16

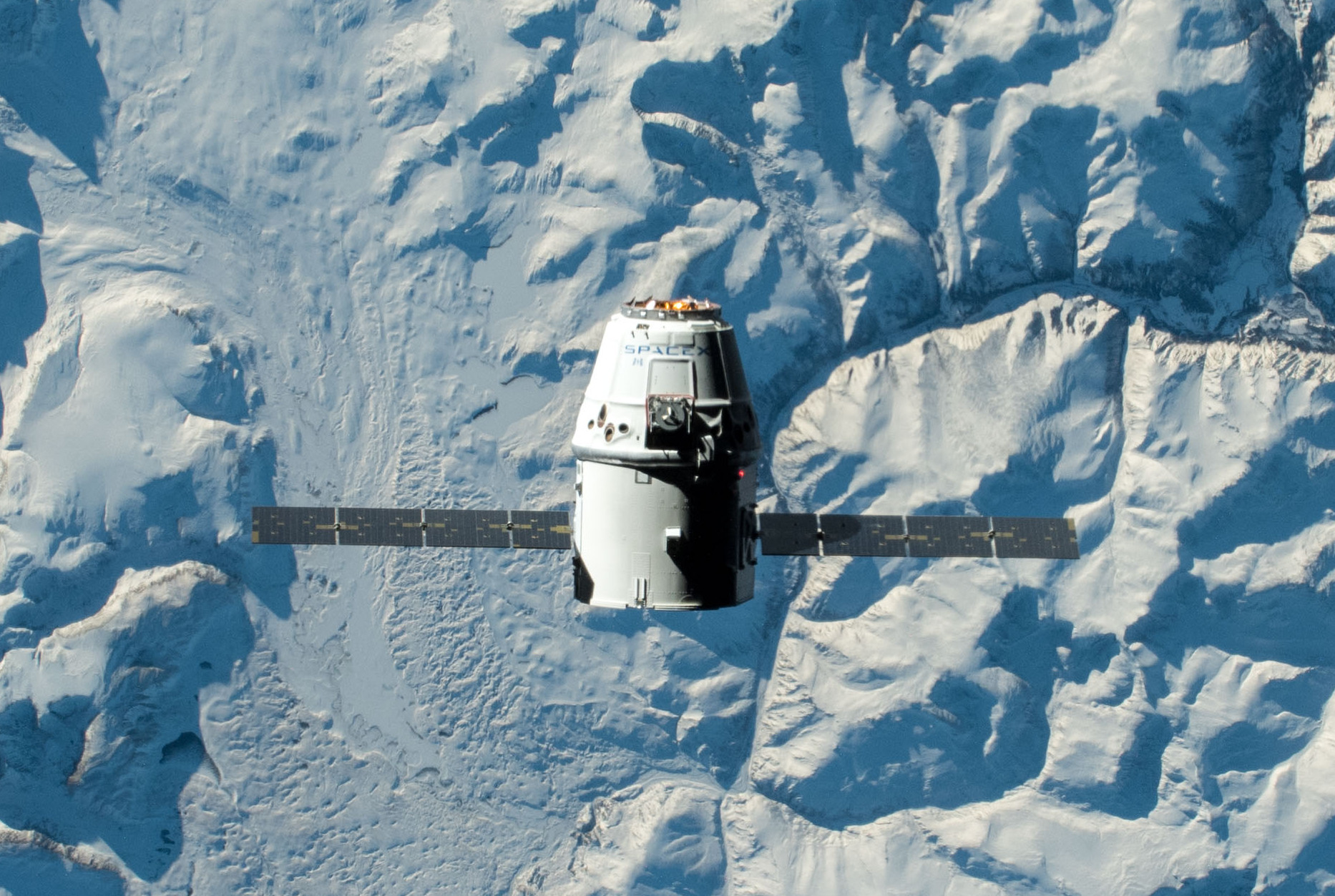
Dragon approaching the ISS

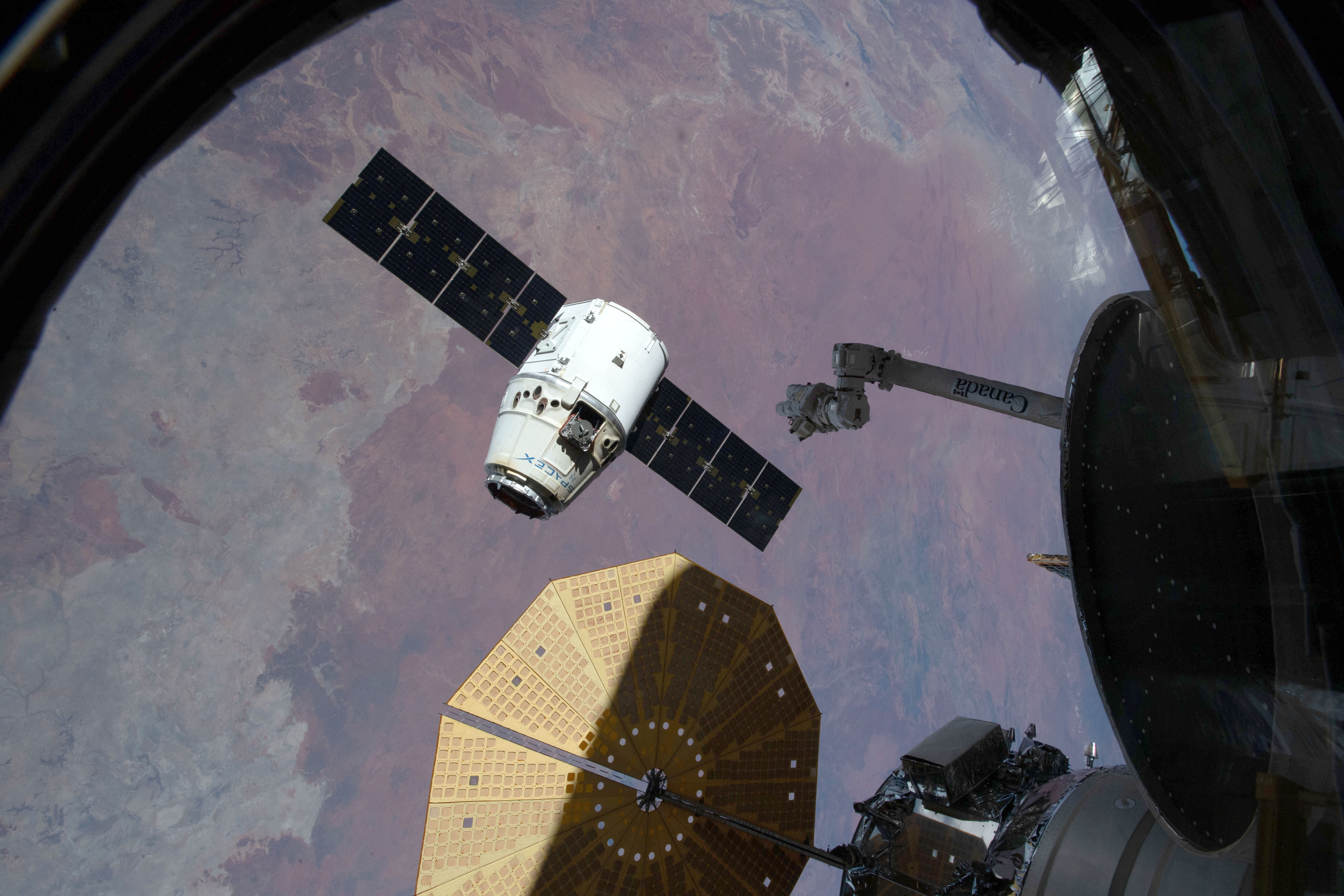
Dragon near the ISS

== See also ==
- Uncrewed spaceflights to the International Space Station
