= Falcon 9 B1050 =

Falcon 9 first stage booster

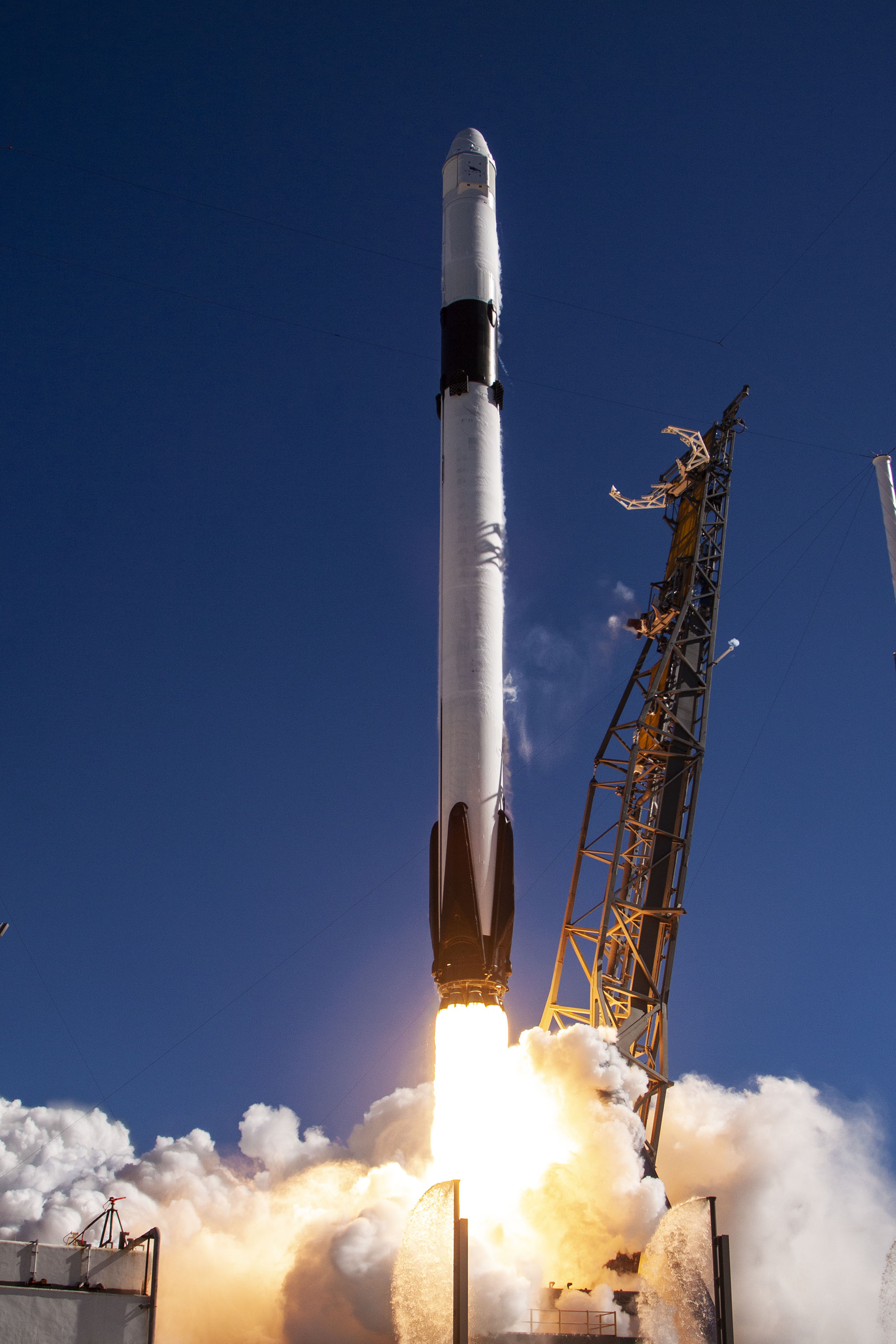
B1050 launches on what would be its only mission.

Falcon 9 B1050 was a reusable first-stage booster for the orbital-class Falcon 9 vehicle manufactured by SpaceX. It launched on December 5, 2018. A grid fin malfunction occurred shortly after the entry burn, resulting in the booster performing a controlled landing in the ocean.

Following this anomaly on its maiden and only flight, B1050 was scrapped for parts. It is believed its cold gas thrusters, as well as some of its electronics, were used for SpaceX's Starhopper prototype.

== Flight ==
B1050 became the fifth Falcon 9 Block 5 booster to enter service when it launched the SpaceX CRS-16 mission to the International Space Station. It was expected to fly on December 4, but was delayed one day due to moldy rodent food for one of the experiments on Dragon. B1050 successfully launched on December 5, separating from the upper stage and Dragon approximately two minutes after liftoff. The vehicle performed boostback and entry burns to guide itself toward a propulsive landing on LZ-1. However, the grid fin hydraulic pump stalled, rendering the fins inoperable. This resulted in a loss of control, and video footage showed the booster rolling. During descent, the Falcon 9 initially aims its trajectory to miss its landing target in case of a failure, and it only steers to the target if all systems are functioning normally. Due to the grid fin failure, the booster did not divert towards LZ-1 and performed its landing burn over the ocean. Remarkably, the booster was able to achieve an intact landing in the water, and it tipped over shortly after splashdown. The booster continued to transmit data for hours after landing, and recovery boats were sent to retrieve it.

== Recovery and possible reuse ==
SpaceX CEO Elon Musk said shortly after the water landing that the booster could be reused for future internal SpaceX launches. Subsequent photos taken of the booster revealed severe damage to the interstage section, raising questions as to whether it could be refurbished.

Divers from Logan Diving and Salvage secured a tow line to the booster on December 6. One landing leg was removed at sea and recovered by the support vessel. The grid fins and remaining landing legs were tethered to airbags prior to towing. B1050 was towed engines-first into Port Canaveral on December 7, 2018, and raised out of the water horizontally.

The landing legs were removed from the booster December 8–11, followed by removal of the grid fins later on December 11.

== Disruption to the SpaceX manifest ==
B1050 was initially scheduled to launch the Canadian RADARSAT mission from Vandenberg Air Force Base in February 2019. However, due to the damage from its water landing, B1050 was unable to support the mission. The RADARSAT mission was delayed until June 2019, when B1051 successfully launched the constellation.

== Flight history ==
Flight no.	Launch date (UTC)	Mission no.	Payload	Pictures	Launch pad	Landing location	Notes
1	December 5, 2018	65	CRS-16		CCAFS SLC-40	Intended landing at a ground pad at LZ-1, instead performed a soft landing in the ocean just offshore. Was the first failed landing intended to land on a ground pad.	Upper stage for this mission was the second to use upgraded COPV tanks.

== See also ==
- Category:Individual Falcon 9 boosters
- List of Falcon 9 first-stage boosters
