= NELL1 =

Protein-coding gene in the species Homo sapiens

Identifiers
- Aliases: NELL1, IDH3GL, NRP1, neural EGFL like 1
- External IDs: OMIM: 602319; MGI: 2443902; HomoloGene: 4486; GeneCards: NELL1; OMA:NELL1 - orthologs

Gene location (Human)
Chr.	Chromosome 11 (human)
Band	11p15.1	Start	20,669,551 bp
Band	11p15.1	End	21,575,686 bp

Gene location (Mouse)
Chr.	Chromosome 7 (mouse)
Band	7|7 B4	Start	49,624,612 bp
Band	7|7 B4	End	50,516,356 bp
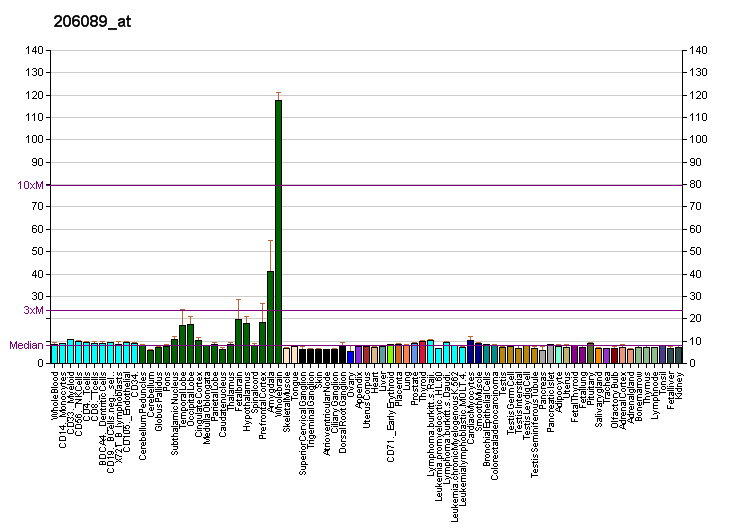
RNA expression pattern
Bgee	Human / Mouse (ortholog); Top expressed in: endothelial cell; buccal mucosa cell; ventricular zone; orbitofrontal cortex; Brodmann area 46; middle temporal gyrus; prefrontal cortex; sperm; Brodmann area 10; superior frontal gyrus / Top expressed in: medial geniculate nucleus; medial dorsal nucleus; lateral geniculate nucleus; dorsomedial hypothalamic nucleus; facial motor nucleus; suprachiasmatic nucleus; superior colliculus; ventral tegmental area; paraventricular nucleus of hypothalamus; lateral hypothalamus; More reference expression data
BioGPS	More reference expression data
Gene ontology
Molecular function	calcium ion binding; protein binding; protein kinase C binding; heparin binding
Cellular component	cytoplasm; perinuclear region of cytoplasm; extracellular region; nuclear envelope; nucleus
Biological process	regulation of gene expression; negative regulation of osteoblast proliferation; cell differentiation; positive regulation of osteoblast differentiation; nervous system development; positive regulation of bone mineralization
Sources:Amigo / QuickGO
Orthologs
Species	Human	Mouse
Entrez	4745	338352
Ensembl	ENSG00000165973	ENSMUSG00000055409
UniProt	Q92832	Q2VWQ2
RefSeq (mRNA)	NM_001288713; NM_001288714; NM_006157; NM_201551	NM_001037906; NM_177413
RefSeq (protein)	NP_001275642; NP_001275643; NP_006148; NP_963845	NP_001032995
Location (UCSC)	Chr 11: 20.67 – 21.58 Mb	Chr 7: 49.62 – 50.52 Mb
PubMed search
- Wikidata
View/Edit Human	View/Edit Mouse

Protein kinase C-binding protein NELL1 also known as NEL-like protein 1 (NELL1) or Nel-related protein 1 (NRP1) is a protein that in humans is encoded by the NELL1 gene.

== Function ==
This gene encodes a cytoplasmic protein that contains epidermal growth factor (EGF) -like repeats. The encoded heterotrimeric protein may be involved in cell growth regulation and differentiation. A similar protein in rodents is involved in craniosynostosis. An alternative splice variant has been described but its full-length sequence has not been determined.

Recent study by UCLA researchers shows that administering the protein NELL-1 intravenously stimulates significant bone formation through the regenerative ability of stem cells.
