= USA-276 =

American reconnaissance satellite

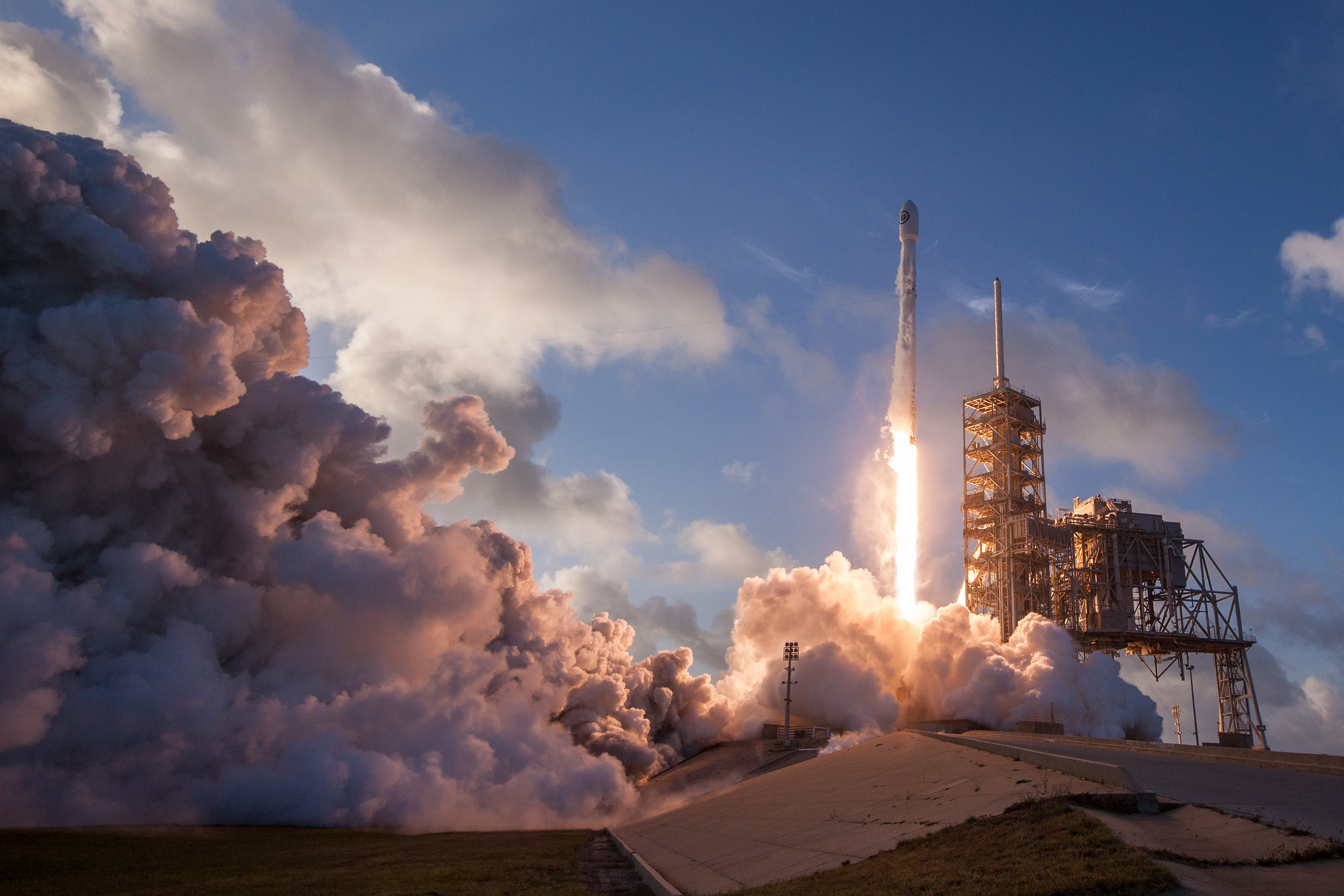
- Names: USA-276; NROL-76
- Mission type: Radar imaging / Technology demonstration
- Operator: National Reconnaissance Office
- COSPAR ID: 2017-022A
- SATCAT no.: 42689

Spacecraft properties
- Manufacturer: Bell Aerospace

Start of mission
- Launch date: May 1, 2017, 7:15 am EST
- Rocket: Falcon 9 Full Thrust
- Launch site: Launch Pad 39A, Cape Canaveral Space Force Station, Florida, United States
- Contractor: SpaceX

Orbital parameters
- Regime: Low Earth Orbit
- Inclination: ~50°

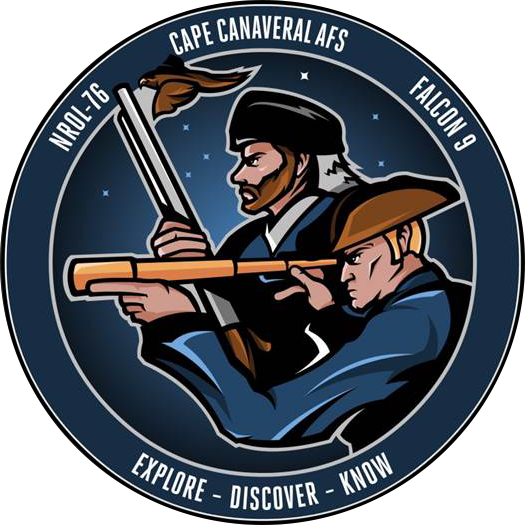
NROL-76 (USA-276) Mission Patch

USA-276, also known as NROL-76, is a classified spacecraft operated by the National Reconnaissance Office. Due to being classified, very little information is known about the satellite.

== Background ==
USA-276 was launched onboard Falcon 9 NROL-76. The Falcon 9 upper stage that carried USA-276 to its orbit made several close flybys of the ISS.

== See also ==
- List of NRO launches
- Sentient (intelligence analysis system)
