= Kennedy Space Center Launch Complex 39A =

Historic launch pad operated by NASA and SpaceX

Launch Complex 39A
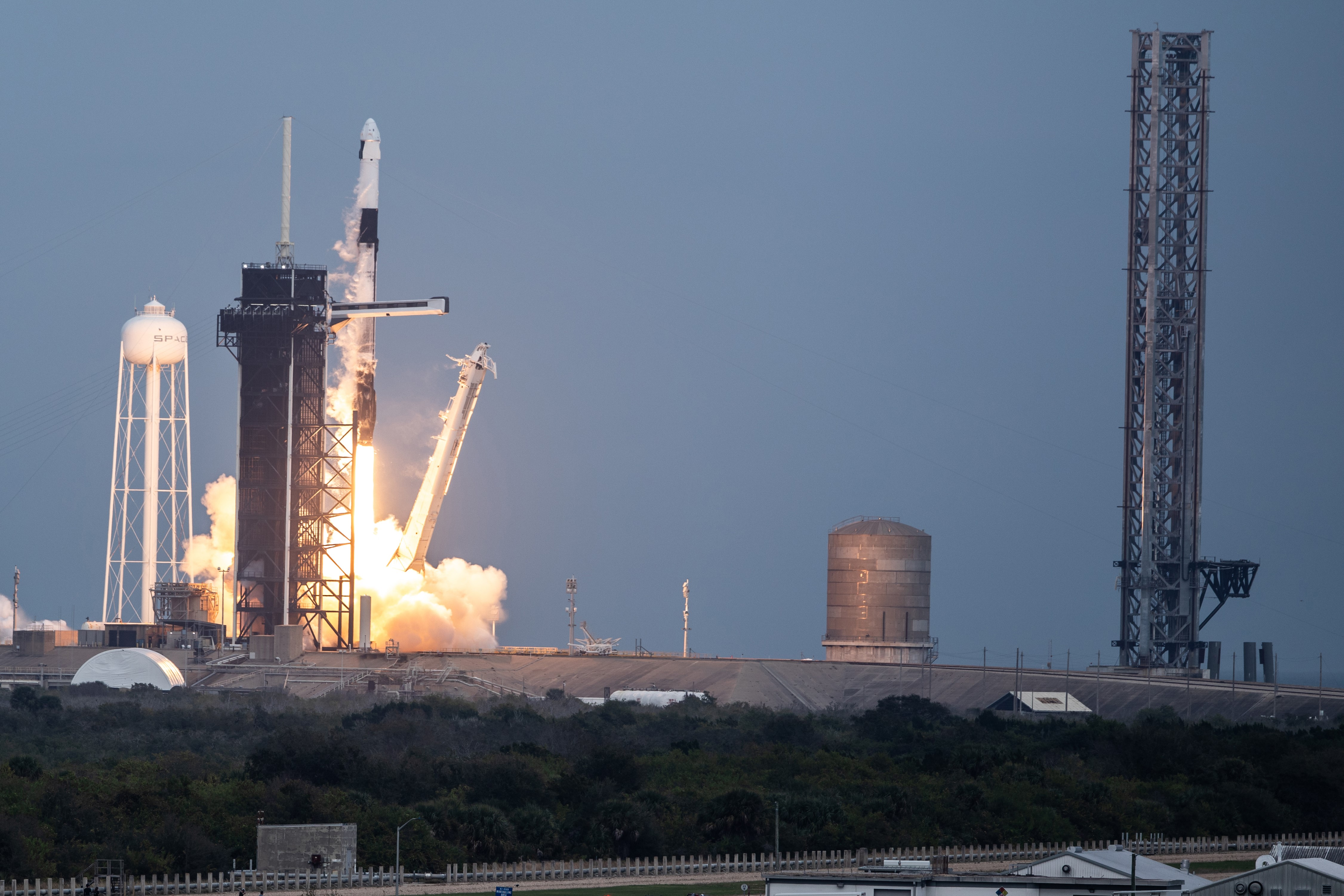
- The pad in January 2024 during the launch of Axiom Mission 3 with the SpaceX Starship launch tower in the background
- Interactive map of Launch Complex 39A
- Launch site: Kennedy Space Center
- Location: Merritt Island, Florida
- Coordinates: 28°36′30″N 80°36′16″W
- Time zone: UTC−05:00 (EST)
  - Summer (DST): UTC−04:00 (EDT)
- Short name: LC-39A
- Established: 1962; 64 years ago
- Operator: NASA (owner); SpaceX (tenant)
- Launch pad: 2, plus 2 landing sites
- Orbital inclination range: 28.5–55, 66–145°
Pad 39A (main) launch history
- Status: Active
- Launches: 222
- First launch: November 9, 1967; Saturn V (Apollo 4)
- Last launch: October 2, 2026; Falcon Heavy (NROL-97)
- Associated rockets: Current: Falcon 9, Falcon Heavy; Retired: Saturn V, Space Shuttle; Plans cancelled: Ares V
Pad 39A (Starship) launch history
- Status: Under Construction
- Associated rockets: Future: Starship
LZ-x landing history
- Status: Planned
- Associated rockets: Future: Falcon 9, Falcon Heavy
LZ-x landing history
- Status: Planned
- Associated rockets: Future: Falcon 9, Falcon Heavy
- Launch Complex 39--Pad A
- U.S. National Register of Historic Places
- Location within Florida Location within the United States
- Area: 160 acres (65 ha)
- Built: 1964–1968
- MPS: John F. Kennedy Space Center MPS
- NRHP reference No.: 99001638
- Added to NRHP: January 21, 2000

Launch sites at Cape Canaveral Space Force Station and Kennedy Space Center
Active pads
Inactive leased pads
Inactive unleased pads
Repurposed pads, not used for launches
1 LC-39B
2 LC-39A
3 LC-48
4 SLC-41
5 SLC-40
6 LC-47
7 SLC-37
8 LC-34
9 SLC-20
10 LC-19
11 LC-16
12 LC-15
13 LC-14
14 LC-13 (LZ-2)
15 LC-12
16 LC-11
17 LC-36
18 LC-1, LC-2, LC-3, and LC-4
19 SLC-46
20 LC-21 and LC-22
21 LC-31 and LC-32
22 LC-18
23 SLC-17
24 LC-26
25 LC-5 and LC-6
26 LC-30
27 LC-25
28 LC-29

Launch Complex 39A (LC-39A) is the first of Launch Complex 39's three launch sub-complexes, located at NASA's Kennedy Space Center in Merritt Island, Florida. The main launch pad, along with Launch Complex 39B, was built in the 1960s to accommodate the Saturn V launch vehicle, and has been used to support NASA crewed space flight missions, including the historic Apollo 11 moon landing and the Space Shuttle. Since 2014, the site has been leased by SpaceX and supports launches of the Falcon 9 and Falcon Heavy rockets. As of November 2025, SpaceX is expanding the site to support Starship operations. Other plans include adding two landing zones for Falcon 9 and Falcon Heavy rockets to conduct "Return-to-launch-site" landings.

== History ==
=== Apollo program ===
In May 1961, U.S. president John F. Kennedy proposed to the U.S. Congress the goal of landing a man on the Moon and returning him safely to the Earth before the end of the decade. Congressional approval led to the launch of the Apollo program, which required a massive expansion of NASA operations, including an expansion of launch operations from the Cape to adjacent Merritt Island to the north and west.

First named Launch Complex 39C, Launch Complex 39A was designed to handle launches of the Saturn V rocket, the largest and most powerful launch vehicle, which would propel the Apollo spacecraft to the Moon. The first launch from Launch Complex 39A occurred in 1967 with the first Saturn V launch, which carried the uncrewed Apollo 4 spacecraft. The second uncrewed launch, Apollo 6, also used Pad 39A. With the exception of Apollo 10, which used Pad 39B (due to the "all-up" testing resulting in a 2-month turnaround period), all crewed Apollo-Saturn V launches, commencing with Apollo 8, used Pad 39A.

=== Skylab program ===
Launch Complex 39A was used for the uncrewed launch of the Skylab space station on May 14, 1973. This used a modified Saturn V originally built for the cancelled Apollo 18 mission. The subsequent Skylab crewed missions launched from Launch Complex 39B using Saturn IB launch vehicles.

=== Space Shuttle ===
With the advent of the Space Shuttle program in the early 1980s, the original structure of the launch pads was remodeled for the needs of the Space Shuttle. The first usage of Pad 39A for the Space Shuttle came in 1979, when Enterprise was used to check the facilities prior to the first operational launch. Since then, Pad 39A hosted all Space Shuttle launches until January 1986, when Space Shuttle Challenger would become the first to launch from pad 39B during the ill-fated STS-51-L mission.

During the launch of Discovery on STS-124 on May 31, 2008, the pad at LC-39A suffered extensive damage, in particular to the concrete trench used to deflect the SRBs' flames. The subsequent investigation found that the damage was the result of carbonation of epoxy and corrosion of steel anchors that held the refractory bricks in the trench in place. The damage had been exacerbated by the fact that hydrochloric acid is an exhaust by-product of the solid rocket boosters.

Just as for the first 24 shuttle flights, LC-39A supported the final shuttle flights, starting with STS-117 in June 2007 and ending with the retirement of the Shuttle fleet in July 2011. In total, Pad 39A hosted 94 launches from 1967 to 2011, including 12 Saturn V rockets and 82 space shuttles. Prior to the SpaceX lease agreement, the pad remained as it was when Atlantis launched on the final shuttle mission on July 8, 2011, complete with a mobile launcher platform. The pad was originally going to be modified for the Ares V rocket for the Constellation program in the mid 2010s, looking identical to LC-39B with the three lightning towers. The Ares I was planned to launch on the adjacent 39B but in 2010, the Constellation program was cancelled.

=== SpaceX ===
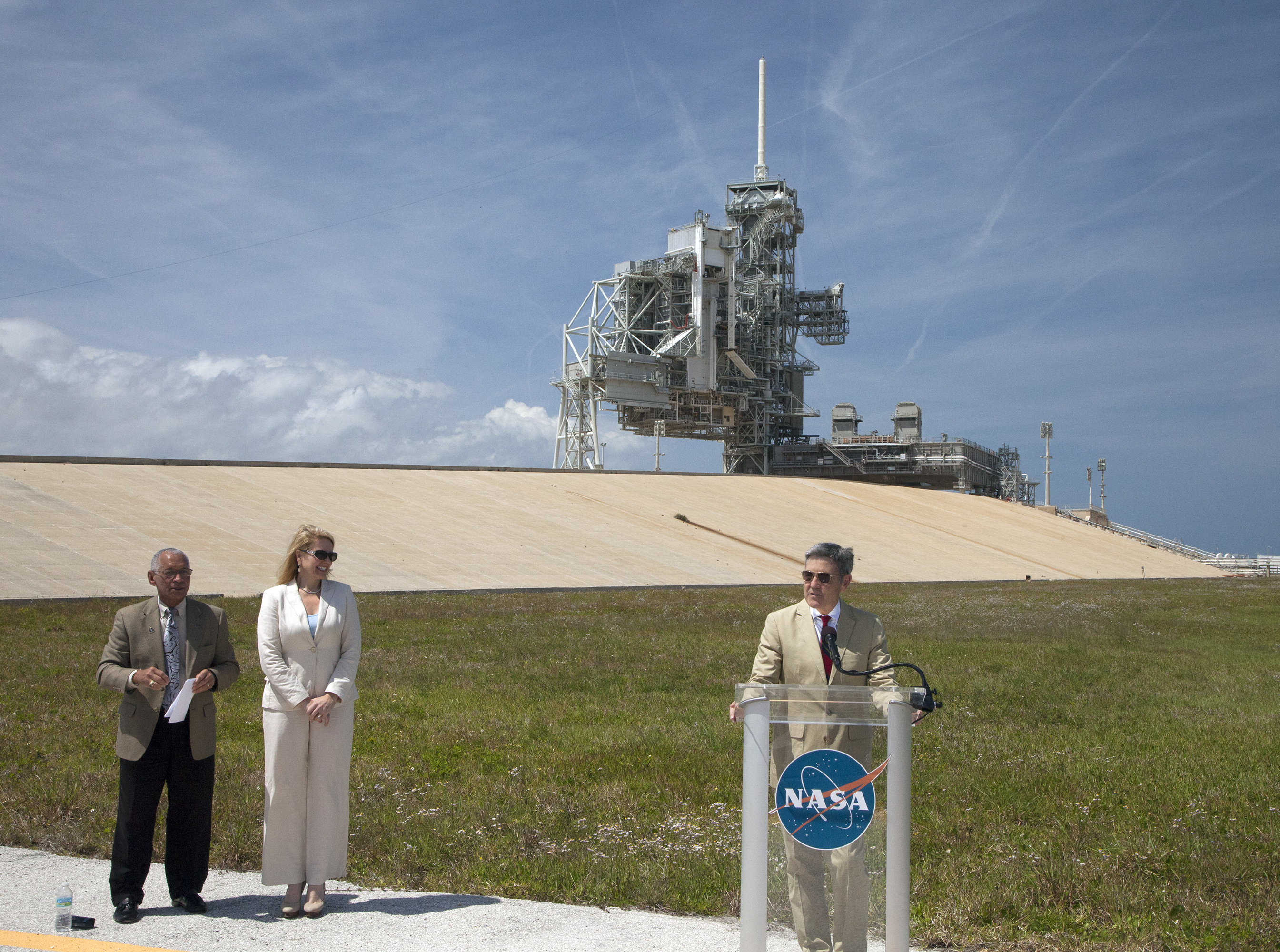
KSC Director Bob Cabana (at podium) announces the signing of the pad 39A lease agreement on April 14, 2014. NASA Administrator Charles Bolden (far left) and SpaceX COO Gwynne Shotwell stand nearby.

Talks for use of the pad were underway between NASA and Space Florida—the State of Florida's economic development agency—as early as 2011, but no deal materialized by 2012, and NASA then pursued other options for removing the pad from the federal government inventory.

By early 2013, NASA publicly announced that it would allow commercial launch providers to lease LC-39A, and followed that, in May 2013, with a formal solicitation for proposals for commercial use of the pad. There were two competing bids for the commercial use of the launch complex. SpaceX submitted a bid for exclusive use of the launch complex, while Jeff Bezos' Blue Origin submitted a bid for shared non-exclusive use of the complex, so that the launchpad would handle multiple vehicles, and costs could be shared over the long-term. One potential shared user in the Blue Origin plan was United Launch Alliance. Prior to the end of the bid period, and prior to any public announcement by NASA of the results of the process, Blue Origin filed a protest with the U.S. General Accounting Office (GAO) "over what it says is a plan by NASA to award an exclusive commercial lease to SpaceX for use of mothballed space shuttle launch pad 39A". NASA had planned to complete the bid award and have the pad transferred by October 1, 2013, but the protest "will delay any decision until the GAO reaches a decision, expected by mid-December". On December 12, 2013, the GAO denied the protest and sided with NASA, which argued that the solicitation contained no preference on the use of the facility as multi-use or single-use. "The [solicitation] document merely asks bidders to explain their reasons for selecting one approach instead of the other and how they would manage the facility".

On December 13, 2013, NASA announced that it had selected SpaceX as the new commercial tenant. On April 14, 2014, SpaceX signed a lease agreement that gave it a 20-year exclusive lease on LC-39A. SpaceX planned to launch their launch vehicles from the pad and build a new hangar nearby. Elon Musk, CEO of SpaceX, stated that he wanted to shift most of SpaceX's NASA launches to LC-39A, including commercial cargo and crew missions to the International Space Station.

==== Modifications ====
In 2015, SpaceX built the Horizontal Integration Facility (HIF) just outside the perimeter of the existing launch pad in order to house both the Falcon 9 and the Falcon Heavy rockets, and their associated hardware and payloads, during preparation for flight. Both types of launch vehicles are transported from the HIF to the launch pad aboard a Transporter Erector (TE) which rides on rails up the former crawlerway path. Also in 2015, the launch mount for the Falcon Heavy was constructed on Pad 39A over the existing infrastructure. The work on both the HIF building and the pad was substantially complete by late 2015. A rollout test of the new Transporter Erector was conducted in November 2015.

In February 2016, SpaceX indicated that they had "completed and activated Launch Complex 39A", but still had more work yet to do to support crewed flights. SpaceX originally planned to be ready to accomplish the first launch at pad 39A—of a Falcon Heavy—as early as 2015, as they had architects and engineers working on the new design and modifications since 2013. By late 2014, a preliminary date for a wet dress rehearsal of the Falcon Heavy was set for no earlier than July 1, 2015. Due to a failure in a June 2015 Falcon 9 launch, SpaceX delayed launching the Falcon Heavy in order to focus on the Falcon 9's failure investigation and its return to flight. In early 2016, considering the busy Falcon 9 launch manifest, it became unclear if the Falcon Heavy would be the first vehicle to launch from Pad 39A, or if one or more Falcon 9 missions would precede a Falcon Heavy launch. In the following months, the Falcon Heavy launch was delayed multiple times and eventually pushed back to February 2018.

SpaceX used the former Fixed Service Structure (FSS) of the Pad 39A launch towers and initially intended to extend it above its former 350-foot (110 m) height. It did not need the Rotating Service Structure (RSS) and removed it beginning in February 2016.

NASA removed the Orbiter Servicing Arm—with intent to use the space later to build a museum—and the white room by which astronauts entered the Space Shuttle. SpaceX indicated in late 2014 that additional levels to the FSS would not be added in the near term. SpaceX planned to eventually add at least two additional levels to the FSS, to provide crew access for the Dragon 2 launches.

In August 2018, SpaceX's Crew Access Arm (CAA) was installed on a new level, which was built at the necessary height to enter the Crew Dragon spacecraft atop a Falcon 9 rocket. It very closely resembles jetways that are frequently found at airports. In September 2018, the refurbished Space Shuttle Emergency Egress System was raised to this new level.

SpaceX added a crew gantry access arm and white room to allow for crew and cargo ingress to the vehicle. The existing Space Shuttle evacuation slide-wire basket system was re-purposed to provide a safe emergency egress for the Dragon crew in the event of an emergency on the pad that does not necessitate using the Crew Dragon's launch abort system".

In 2019, SpaceX began substantial modification to LC 39A in order to begin work on phase 1 of the construction to prepare the facility to launch prototypes of the large 9 m (30 ft)-diameter methalox reusable rocket—Starship—from a launch stand, which would fly from 39A on suborbital test flight trajectories with six or fewer Raptor engines. A second phase of the construction was planned for 2020 to build a much more capable launch mount capable of launching the entire Starship launch vehicle, powered by 33 Raptor engines and producing a total of 72 MN (16,000,000 lbf) liftoff thrust when departing 39A.

In August 2019, SpaceX submitted an Environmental Assessment for the Starship launch system at Kennedy Space Center. This document included plans for the construction of additional structures at LC-39A to support Starship launches, including a dedicated pad, liquid methane tanks, and a Landing Zone. These are separate from the existing structures that support Falcon 9 and Falcon Heavy launches.

In December 2021, SpaceX started construction of a Starship orbital launch pad on the site.

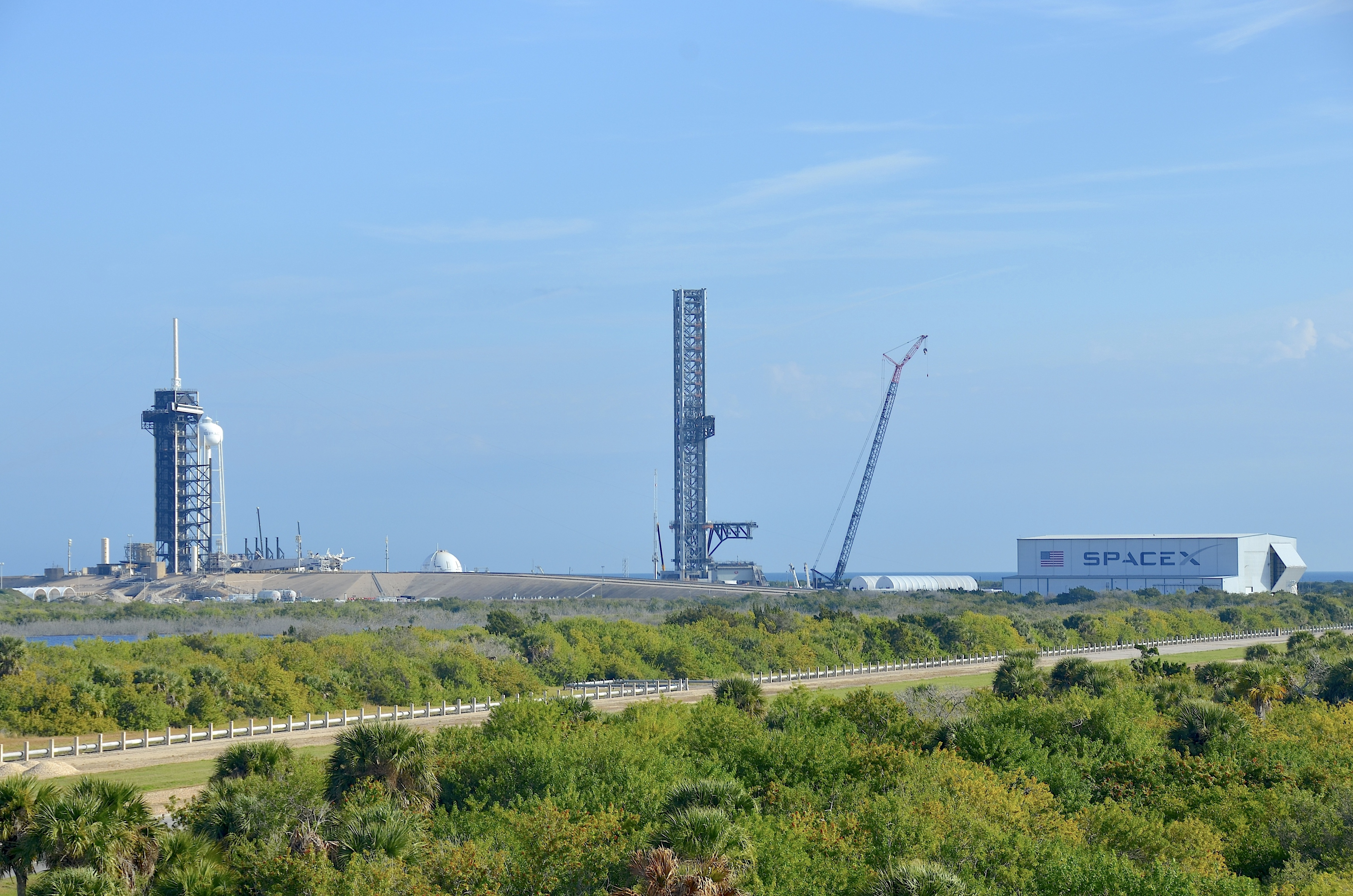
LC-39A in early 2026, with constructed SpaceX's facilities.

On June 16, 2022, the first tower segment for the Starship orbital pad arrived at LC-39A. Stacking began on June 21, and the Starship launch mount was also under construction. In 2024, an additional Environmental Impact Statement was underway to support an annual launch cadence of 40+ Starship launches. In early 2025, the original launch mount for LC-39a was scrapped in favor of a new design. The new launch mount was fabricated at SpaceX's Roberts Road facility and was transported to the launch complex for installation on November 4, 2025.

==== Launch history ====
The first SpaceX launch from pad 39A was SpaceX CRS-10 on February 19, 2017, using a Falcon 9 launch vehicle; it was the company's 10th cargo resupply mission to the International Space Station, and the first uncrewed launch from 39A since Skylab.

While Cape Canaveral Space Launch Complex 40 (SLC-40) was undergoing reconstruction after the loss of the AMOS-6 satellite on September 1, 2016, all SpaceX's east coast launches were from Pad 39A until SLC-40 became operational again in December 2017. These included the May 1, 2017, launch of NROL-76, the first SpaceX mission for the National Reconnaissance Office, with a classified payload.

On February 6, 2018, Pad 39A hosted the successful liftoff of the Falcon Heavy on its maiden launch, carrying Elon Musk's Tesla Roadster car to space; and the first flight of the human-rated spacecraft Dragon 2; (Demo-1) took place there on March 2, 2019.

The second Falcon Heavy flight, carrying the Arabsat-6A communications satellite for Arabsat of Saudi Arabia, successfully launched on April 11, 2019. The satellite provides K_{u}-band and K_{a}-band communication services for the Middle East and northern Africa, as well as for South Africa. The launch was notable as it marked the first time that SpaceX was able to successfully soft-land all three of the reusable booster stages, which were to be refurbished for future launches.

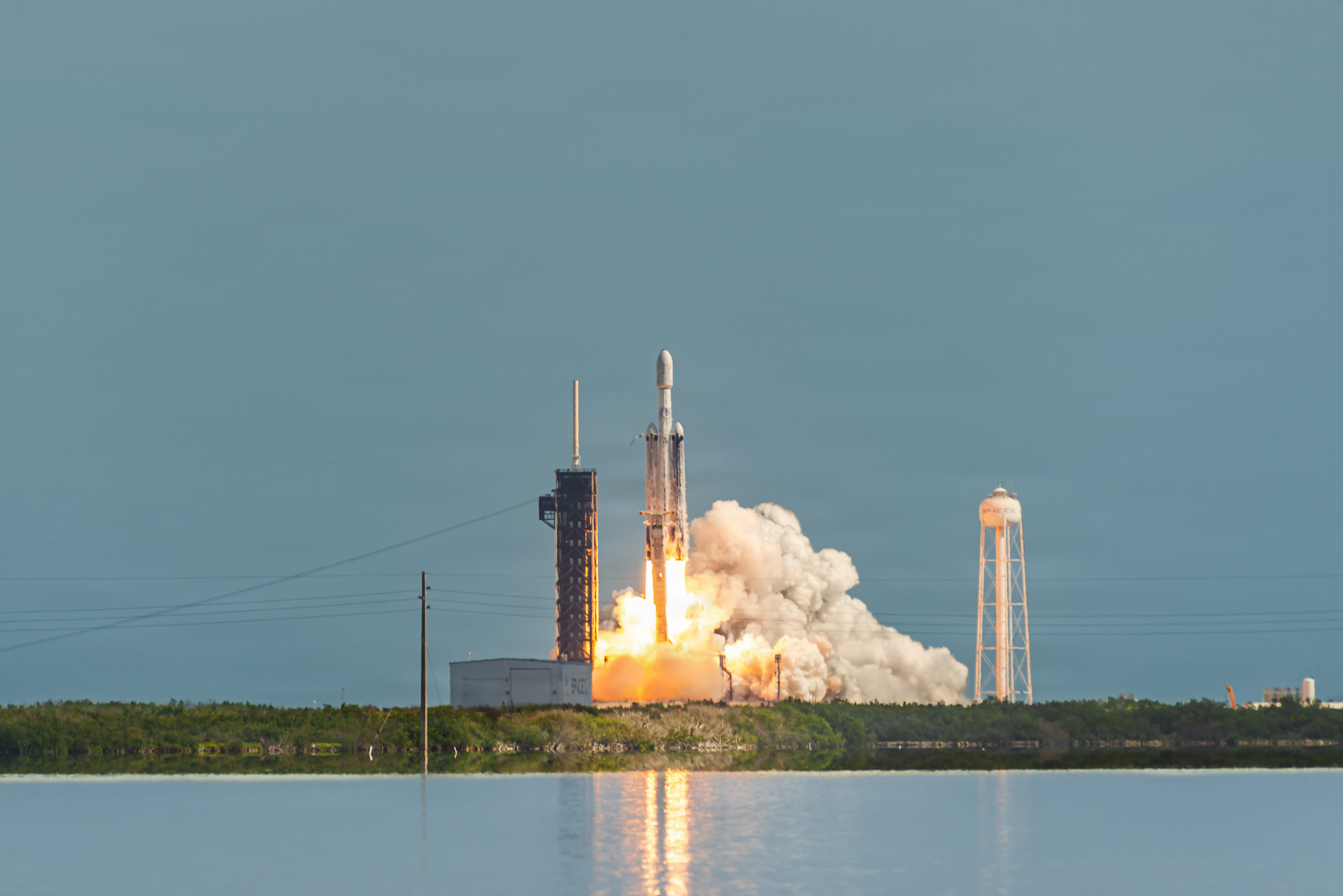
Falcon Heavy launching ViaSat-3 F3 from LC-39A in 2026.

The Crew Dragon Demo-2 test flight launched with astronauts Bob Behnken and Doug Hurley from Launch Complex 39A on 30 May 2020, and docked to the forward port of the Harmony module of the ISS on 31 May 2020. The first operational Commercial Crew mission Crew-1 was launched on November 15, 2020.

SpaceX launched the IM-1 robotic lander for NASA's Commercial Lunar Payload Services program on 15 February 2024, returning the pad to Lunar missions since the end of the Apollo program. The Starlink Group 6-56 mission launched on 8 May 2024, and was the Falcon 9's 83rd launch from LC-39A. That milestone made the rocket family the pad leader for launches from that launch complex, surpassing the Space Shuttle's 82 launches.

== Current status ==
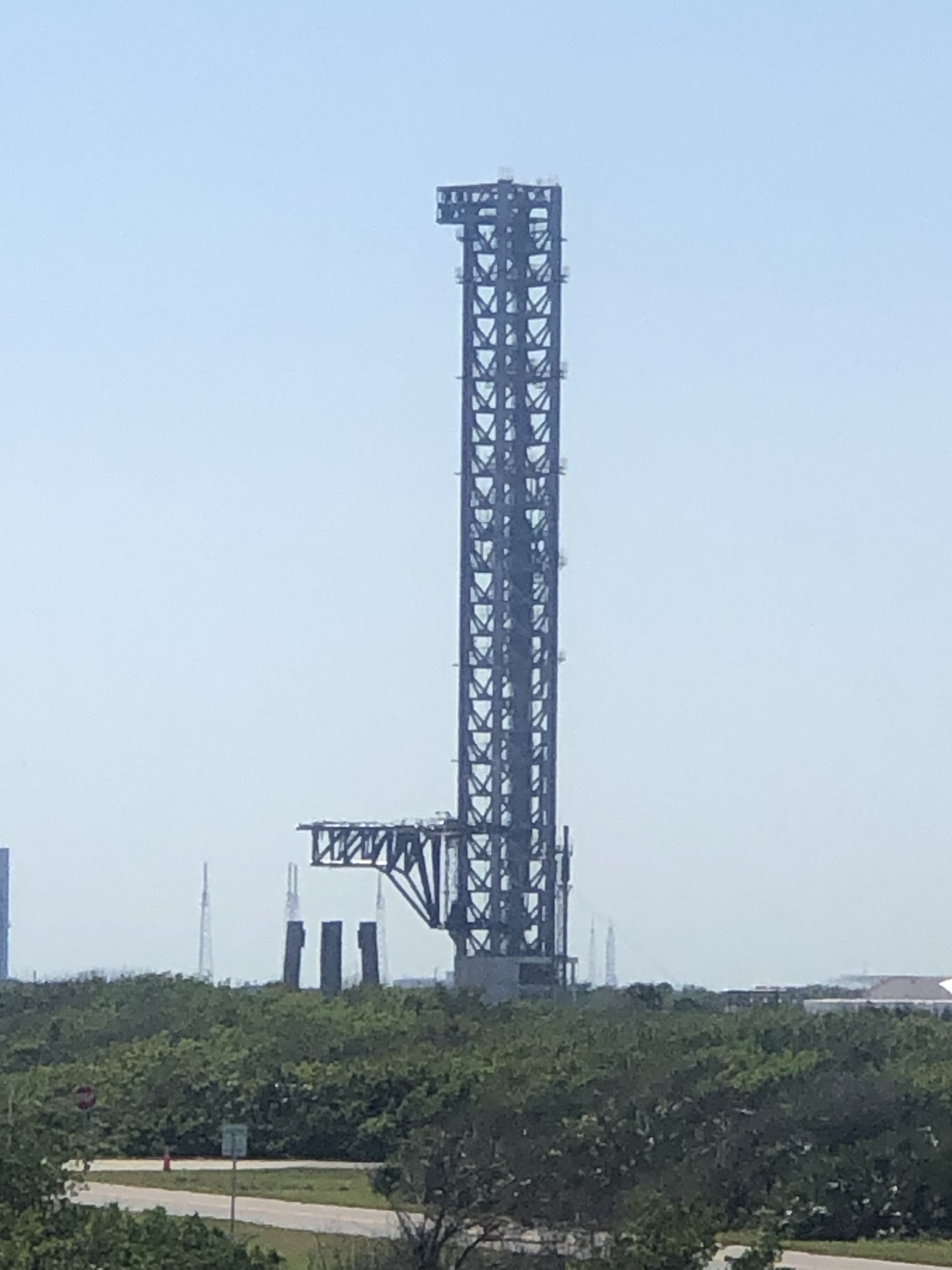
SpaceX's "orbital launch mount" at LC-39A for Starship with "catch arms" visible towards the base of the tower

The private American company SpaceX has been the lease holder as of April 14, 2014. The terms of the agreement gave SpaceX a 20-year exclusive lease to LC-39A. SpaceX has launched their launch vehicles from the pad since the launch of the SpaceX CRS-10 Dragon resupply mission in 2017, and crewed missions since the launch of the Crew Dragon Demo-2 mission in 2020. Currently Pad 39A is used to host launches of astronauts on the crewed-version of the Dragon space capsule in a public–private partnership with NASA.

SpaceX assembles its launch vehicles horizontally in a hangar near the pad and transports them horizontally to the pad before erecting the vehicle to vertical for the launch.

SpaceX is building a Starship pad at LC-39A with a configuration equivalent to Pad B at Starbase. The launch tower was fully stacked in September 2022. After a few years of dormancy, SpaceX resumed work on the pad in the summer of 2024. On November 5, 2025, the launch mount for the Starship pad was lifted into place. As of November 16, 2026 the Launch tower is ready for pre-flight testing, the latest test was executed on November 5, 2026 with up to 44 launches and 88 landings per year approved by the FAA on January 30, 2026 and other government permits like with the department of fish and wildlife have been filed on February 5, 2026

== Future plans ==
With the expiration of the leases on LZ-1 and LZ-2, SpaceX plans to construct two landing zones for Falcon 9 and Falcon Heavy "Return-to-launch-site" landings.

There are also plans to expand the tank farm at the site and construct a separate catch-only tower for recovering Starship vehicles.

== Launch statistics ==
=== Main pad ===
- Saturn V
- Space Shuttle
- Falcon 9
- Falcon Heavy

==== Apollo and Apollo Applications ====
All flights operated by NASA.

No.	Date	Time (UTC)	Launch vehicle	Serial number	Mission	Result	Remarks
1	9 November 1967	12:00	Saturn V	SA-501	Apollo 4	Success	Maiden flight of the Saturn V and first launch from LC-39A.
2	4 April 1968	12:00	Saturn V	SA-502	Apollo 6	Partial failure	Pogo oscillations caused a failure of two J-2s in the S-II and a relight of the S-IVB, severely changing the planned mission trajectory of the Apollo CSM.
3	21 December 1968	12:51	Saturn V	SA-503	Apollo 8	Success	First crewed launch of the Saturn V and first crewed launch from LC-39A. First crewed launch going beyond low Earth orbit, inserting into Lunar orbit.
4	3 March 1969	16:00	Saturn V	SA-504	Apollo 9 (CSM Gumdrop and LM Spider)	Success	First launch of the Saturn V in its full Apollo configuration, flying with an Apollo Lunar Module. First American manned flight with a call sign since Gemini 3's Molly Brown in 1965.
5	16 July 1969	13:32	Saturn V	SA-506	Apollo 11 (CSM Columbia and LM Eagle)	Success	First fully operational Apollo flight. First crewed landing on the Moon and on another celestial body.
6	14 November 1969	16:22	Saturn V	SA-507	Apollo 12 (CSM Yankee Clipper and LM Intrepid)	Success	A lightning strike caused the shutdown of the CSM's computer systems, but was successfully restarted mid-flight. First surface rendezvous on another celestial body, landing next to Surveyor 3.
7	11 April 1970	19:13	Saturn V	SA-508	Apollo 13 (CSM Odyssey and LM Aquarius)	Partial failure	First crewed flyby of the Moon and set crewed distance record from Earth that stood until Artemis II in 2026. Launch was a success, but mission had to be aborted following a failure in the CSM's service module during the lunar transfer phase.
8	31 January 1971	21:03	Saturn V	SA-509	Apollo 14 (CSM Kitty Hawk and LM Antares)	Success	
9	26 July 1971	13:34	Saturn V	SA-510	Apollo 15 (CSM Endeavour and LM Falcon)	Success	First flight of the extended Apollo missions, notably carrying the Lunar Roving Vehicle.
10	16 April 1972	17:54	Saturn V	SA-511	Apollo 16 (CSM Casper and LM Orion)	Success	Second flight of the extended Apollo missions.
11	7 December 1972	05:33	Saturn V	SA-512	Apollo 17 (CSM America and LM Challenger)	Success	Last crewed launch of the Saturn V, and last of the extended Apollo missions. Final crewed flight to the Moon until Artemis II in 2026.
12	14 May 1973	17:30	Saturn V	SA-513	Skylab	Success	Last flight of the Saturn V. The S-IVB was replaced with the space station module, while the S-II was modified to make orbit. Payload was extensively damaged during ascent, leading to the loss of the station's micrometeoroid shield and a solar panel.

==== Space Shuttle ====
All flights operated by NASA.

No.	Date	Time (UTC)	Launch vehicle	Shuttle	Mission	Result	Remarks
13	12 April 1981	12:00	Space Shuttle	Columbia	STS-1	Success	Maiden flight of the Space Shuttle program, and maiden flight of Space Shuttle Columbia. First Space Shuttle orbital test. First shuttle landing at Edwards.
14	12 November 1981	15:10	Space Shuttle	Columbia	STS-2	Success	Second orbital test.
15	22 March 1982	16:00	Space Shuttle	Columbia	STS-3	Success	Third orbital test. Only shuttle landing at White Sands.
16	27 June 1982	15:00	Space Shuttle	Columbia	STS-4	Success	Fourth and final Space Shuttle orbital test. First flight for the Department of Defense.
17	11 November 1982	12:19	Space Shuttle	Columbia	STS-5	Success	
18	4 April 1983	18:30	Space Shuttle	Challenger	STS-6	Success	Maiden flight of Space Shuttle Challenger. Launch and deployment of TDRS-1 (as TDRS-A). First launch for the Tracking and Data Relay Satellite System.
19	18 June 1983	11:33	Space Shuttle	Challenger	STS-7	Success	First crewed American flight with a female astronaut, Sally Ride.
20	30 August 1983	06:32	Space Shuttle	Challenger	STS-8	Success	First night launch and night landing of a Shuttle. First crewed flight with an African-American astronaut, Guion Bluford.
21	28 November 1983	16:00	Space Shuttle	Columbia	STS-9	Success	First mission using Spacelab.
22	3 February 1984	13:00	Space Shuttle	Challenger	STS-41-B	Success	First shuttle landing at the Shuttle Landing Facility.
23	6 April 1984	13:58	Space Shuttle	Challenger	STS-41-C	Success	Repair mission for the Solar Maximum Mission satellite launched in 1980. Also deployed the Long Duration Exposure Facility, aiming to study long-term data placed in an outer space environment.
24	30 August 1984	12:41	Space Shuttle	Discovery	STS-41-D	Success	Maiden flight of Space Shuttle Discovery.
25	5 October 1984	11:03	Space Shuttle	Challenger	STS-41-G	Success	Deployment of Earth Radiation Budget Satellite, aiming to study Earth's energy budget.
26	8 November 1984	12:15	Space Shuttle	Discovery	STS-51-A	Success	
27	24 January 1985	19:50	Space Shuttle	Discovery	STS-51-C	Success	DoD mission. Deployment of Magnum satellite, also known as USA-8.
28	12 April 1985	13:59	Space Shuttle	Discovery	STS-51-D	Success	
29	29 April 1985	16:02	Space Shuttle	Challenger	STS-51-B	Success	
30	17 June 1985	11:33	Space Shuttle	Discovery	STS-51-G	Success	
31	29 July 1985	22:00	Space Shuttle	Challenger	STS-51-F	Success	Mission was ultimately a success, but a faulty temperature reading caused an early shutdown of one of the RS-25s, forcing an abort to orbit. Insertion was thus much lower than planned altitude.
32	27 August 1985	10:58	Space Shuttle	Discovery	STS-51-I	Success	
33	3 October 1985	15:15	Space Shuttle	Atlantis	STS-51-J	Success	Maiden flight of Space Shuttle Atlantis. DoD mission. Deployment of two Defense Satellite Communications System satellites, also known as USA-11 and USA-12.
34	30 October 1985	17:00	Space Shuttle	Challenger	STS-61-A	Success	Final successful flight of Space Shuttle Challenger.
35	27 November 1985	00:29	Space Shuttle	Atlantis	STS-61-B	Success	
36	12 January 1986	11:55	Space Shuttle	Columbia	STS-61-C	Success	Last Space Shuttle flight before the Challenger disaster. Carried Representative Bill Nelson onboard.
37	9 January 1990	12:35	Space Shuttle	Columbia	STS-32	Success	First flight from LC-39A following the Space Shuttle's return to flight in 1988. Retrieval of the Long Duration Exposure Facility.
38	28 February 1990	07:50	Space Shuttle	Atlantis	STS-36	Success	DoD mission. Deployment of Misty satellite, also known as USA-53. Shuttle mission with the highest inclination, at 62°. Originally planned to launch from SLC-6 at Vandenberg, prior to the West Coast shuttle program's cancellation post-Challenger.
39	15 November 1990	23:48	Space Shuttle	Atlantis	STS-38	Success	DoD mission. Deployment of SDS satellite, also known as USA-67.
40	28 April 1991	11:33	Space Shuttle	Discovery	STS-39	Success	DoD mission. Performed a variety of experiments.
41	2 August 1991	15:02	Space Shuttle	Atlantis	STS-43	Success	Launch and deployment of TDRS-5 (as TDRS-E) for the Tracking and Data Relay Satellite System.
42	12 September 1991	23:11	Space Shuttle	Discovery	STS-48	Success	Launch and deployment of the Upper Atmosphere Research Satellite.
43	24 November 1991	23:44	Space Shuttle	Atlantis	STS-44	Success	DoD mission. Deployment of Defense Support Program satellite, also known as USA-75.
44	22 January 1992	14:52	Space Shuttle	Discovery	STS-42	Success	
45	24 March 1992	13:13	Space Shuttle	Atlantis	STS-45	Success	
46	25 June 1992	16:12	Space Shuttle	Columbia	STS-50	Success	
47	2 December 1992	13:24	Space Shuttle	Discovery	STS-53	Success	Last flight for the DoD. Deployment of SDS satellite, also known as USA-89.
48	26 April 1993	14:50	Space Shuttle	Columbia	STS-55	Success	
49	3 February 1994	12:10	Space Shuttle	Discovery	STS-60	Success	First shuttle mission to fly with a Russian cosmonaut, Sergei Krikalev.
50	9 April 1994	11:05	Space Shuttle	Endeavour	STS-59	Success	First flight of Space Shuttle Endeavour from 39A.
51	8 July 1994	04:43	Space Shuttle	Columbia	STS-65	Success	
52	30 September 1994	11:16	Space Shuttle	Endeavour	STS-68	Success	
53	2 March 1995	06:38	Space Shuttle	Endeavour	STS-67	Success	
54	27 June 1995	19:32	Space Shuttle	Atlantis	STS-71	Success	First Shuttle docking with the Mir space station.
55	7 September 1995	15:09	Space Shuttle	Endeavour	STS-69	Success	
56	12 November 1995	12:30	Space Shuttle	Atlantis	STS-74	Success	Docking with Mir. Launch and delivery of the Mir Docking Module to the station.
57	16 September 1996	08:54	Space Shuttle	Atlantis	STS-79	Success	Docking with Mir.
58	11 February 1997	08:55	Space Shuttle	Discovery	STS-82	Success	Servicing mission for the Hubble Space Telescope.
59	4 April 1997	19:20	Space Shuttle	Columbia	STS-83	Success	Mission cut short because of a fuel cell issue.
60	15 May 1997	08:07	Space Shuttle	Atlantis	STS-84	Success	Docking with Mir.
61	1 July 1997	18:02	Space Shuttle	Columbia	STS-94	Success	Reflight of STS-83.
62	7 August 1997	14:41	Space Shuttle	Discovery	STS-85	Success	
63	25 September 1997	14:34	Space Shuttle	Atlantis	STS-86	Success	Docking with Mir.
64	23 January 1998	02:48	Space Shuttle	Endeavour	STS-89	Success	Docking with Mir.
65	2 June 1998	22:06	Space Shuttle	Discovery	STS-91	Success	Last shuttle mission to Mir.
66	4 December 1998	08:35	Space Shuttle	Endeavour	STS-88	Success	First flight to the International Space Station and first ISS assembly flight. Added the Unity Node 1 module.
67	11 February 2000	16:43	Space Shuttle	Endeavour	STS-99	Success	
68	19 May 2000	10:11	Space Shuttle	Atlantis	STS-101	Success	Docking with the ISS.
69	11 October 2000	23:17	Space Shuttle	Discovery	STS-92	Success	ISS assembly flight, adding the Z1 truss.
70	7 February 2001	23:13	Space Shuttle	Atlantis	STS-98	Success	ISS assembly flight, adding the Destiny US Lab module.
71	19 April 2001	18:40	Space Shuttle	Endeavour	STS-100	Success	ISS assembly flight, adding the Mobile Servicing System.
72	10 August 2001	21:10	Space Shuttle	Discovery	STS-105	Success	Docking with the ISS.
73	1 March 2002	11:22	Space Shuttle	Columbia	STS-109	Success	Servicing mission for the Hubble Space Telescope. Final successful flight of Space Shuttle Columbia.
74	5 June 2002	21:22	Space Shuttle	Endeavour	STS-111	Success	Docking with the ISS.
75	24 November 2002	00:49	Space Shuttle	Endeavour	STS-113	Success	ISS assembly flight, adding the P1 truss. Last shuttle flight before the Columbia disaster.
76	16 January 2003	15:39	Space Shuttle	Columbia	STS-107	Failure	Launch and orbital operations were a success, but damage to the thermal protection system during ascent resulted in breakup during reentry, causing the Space Shuttle Columbia disaster.
77	8 June 2007	23:38	Space Shuttle	Atlantis	STS-117	Success	ISS assembly flight, adding the S3/S4 truss and solar arrays. First launch from 39A following the shuttle's return to service in 2005.
78	8 August 2007	23:36	Space Shuttle	Endeavour	STS-118	Success	ISS assembly flight, adding the S5 truss.
79	23 October 2007	15:38	Space Shuttle	Discovery	STS-120	Success	ISS assembly flight, adding the Harmony Node 2 module.
80	7 February 2008	19:45	Space Shuttle	Atlantis	STS-122	Success	ISS assembly flight, adding the Columbus European Laboratory module.
81	11 March 2008	06:28	Space Shuttle	Endeavour	STS-123	Success	ISS assembly flight, adding the Experiment Logistics Module-Pressurized Section and Dextre.
82	31 May 2008	21:02	Space Shuttle	Discovery	STS-124	Success	ISS assembly flight, adding the Kibō Japanese Experiment Module.
83	15 November 2008	00:55	Space Shuttle	Endeavour	STS-126	Success	Docking with the ISS.
84	15 March 2009	23:43	Space Shuttle	Discovery	STS-119	Success	ISS assembly flight, adding the S6 solar array and truss.
85	11 May 2009	18:01	Space Shuttle	Atlantis	STS-125	Success	Final servicing mission for the Hubble Space Telescope, and final non-ISS Space Shuttle mission.
86	15 July 2009	22:03	Space Shuttle	Endeavour	STS-127	Success	ISS assembly flight, adding the Japanese Experiment Module Exposed Facility.
87	29 August 2009	03:59	Space Shuttle	Discovery	STS-128	Success	Docking with the ISS. Final shuttle landing at Edwards.
88	16 November 2009	19:28	Space Shuttle	Atlantis	STS-129	Success	Docking with the ISS.
89	8 February 2010	09:14	Space Shuttle	Endeavour	STS-130	Success	ISS assembly flight, adding the Tranquility Node 3 module and Cupola.
90	5 April 2010	10:21	Space Shuttle	Discovery	STS-131	Success	Docking with the ISS. Final night launch of the Space Shuttle.
91	14 May 2010	18:20	Space Shuttle	Atlantis	STS-132	Success	ISS assembly flight, adding the Rassvet Mini-Research module.
92	24 February 2011	21:53	Space Shuttle	Discovery	STS-133	Success	ISS assembly flight, adding the Leonardo Permanent Multipurpose Module. Final daytime shuttle landing, and final flight of Space Shuttle Discovery.
93	16 May 2011	12:56	Space Shuttle	Endeavour	STS-134	Success	ISS assembly flight, adding the Alpha Magnetic Spectrometer. Final flight of Space Shuttle Endeavour.
94	8 July 2011	15:29	Space Shuttle	Atlantis	STS-135	Success	Docking with the ISS. Final flight of Space Shuttle Atlantis, final crewed launch from the United States until 2020, and the final flight of the Space Shuttle program.

==== Falcon 9 and Falcon Heavy ====
All flights operated by SpaceX.

===== Falcon 9 and Falcon Heavy (2017-2025) =====
No.	Date	Time (UTC)	Launch Vehicle	Booster flight (Note: Falcon 9 first-stage boosters have a four-digit serial number. A hyphen followed by a number indicates the flight count. For example, B1021‑1 and B1021‑2 represent the first and second flights of booster B1021. Boosters without a hyphen were expended on their first flight.)	Payload/mission	Result	Remarks
95	19 February 2017	14:39	Falcon 9 Full Thrust	1031‑1	SpaceX CRS-10	Success	ISS resupply flight. First Falcon 9 launch from LC-39A, and first unmanned launch from 39A since Skylab in 1973. Originally planned to launch from SLC-40, but the AMOS-6 preclusion rendered that pad out of use until repairs.
96	16 March 2017	06:00	Falcon 9 Full Thrust	1030	EchoStar 23	Success	First uncrewed launch not to the ISS from LC-39A since Apollo 6 in 1968. First stage expended.
97	30 March 2017	22:27	Falcon 9 Full Thrust	1021‑2	SES-10	Success	First ever reflight of a previously used Falcon 9 first stage, being previously flown in 2016 as part of SpaceX CRS-8.
98	1 May 2017	11:15	Falcon 9 Full Thrust	1032‑1	NROL-76	Success	NRO launch. Unknown satellite, also known as USA-276. First classified Falcon 9 flight and first SpaceX flight for the National Reconnaissance Office.
99	15 May 2017	23:21	Falcon 9 Full Thrust	1034‑1	Inmarsat-5 F4	Success	First stage expended.
100	3 June 2017	21:07	Falcon 9 Full Thrust	1035‑1	SpaceX CRS-11	Success	ISS resupply flight. Launched and delivered ROSA and NICER. First flight of a reused Dragon capsule, previously flown as part of SpaceX CRS-4.
101	23 June 2017	19:10	Falcon 9 Full Thrust	1029‑2	BulgariaSat-1	Success	
102	5 July 2017	23:38	Falcon 9 Full Thrust	1037	Intelsat 35e	Success	First stage expended.
103	14 August 2017	16:31	Falcon 9 Block 4	1039‑1	SpaceX CRS-12	Success	ISS resupply flight. First Block 4 launch.
104	7 September 2017	14:00	Falcon 9 Block 4	1040‑1	X-37B OTV-5	Success	Fifth flight of the Boeing X-37B. First X-37B flight not launched on an Atlas V.
105	11 October 2017	22:53	Falcon 9 Full Thrust	1031‑2	SES-11 / EchoStar 105	Success	
106	30 October 2017	19:34	Falcon 9 Block 4	1042‑1	Koreasat 5A	Success	
107	6 February 2018	20:45	Falcon Heavy	1033 (core); 1023‑2, 1025‑2 (sides)	Falcon Heavy test flight	Success	Maiden launch of Falcon Heavy and first of two National Security Space Launch certification launches. Placed Elon Musk's Tesla Roadster into heliocentric orbit. Boosters successfully recovered, but core stage was lost. First flight from LC-39A since SLC-40 was reactivated.
108	11 May 2018	20:14	Falcon 9 Block 5	1046‑1	Bangabandhu-1	Success	First Block 5 launch.
109	15 November 2018	20:46	Falcon 9 Block 5	1047‑2	Es'hail 2	Success	
110	2 March 2019	07:19	Falcon 9 Block 5	1051‑1	Crew Dragon Demo-1 (Dragon C204)	Success	Maiden flight of Crew Dragon and first SpaceX demonstration flight for the Commercial Crew Program, docking with the ISS. Only flight of Dragon C204 before it was accidentally destroyed during a test.
111	11 April 2019	22:35	Falcon Heavy	1055 (core); 1052‑1, 1053‑1 (sides)	Arabsat-6A	Success	First Block 5 Falcon Heavy launch and second of two National Security Space Launch certification launches. All three cores safely landed, but the core stage tipped over during transport back to Port Canaveral.
112	25 June 2019	06:30	Falcon Heavy	1057 (core); 1052‑2, 1053‑2 (sides)	STP-2	Success	First DoD flight for Falcon Heavy, and successful recovery of a fairing.
113	19 January 2020	15:30	Falcon 9 Block 5	1046‑4	Crew Dragon in-flight abort test (Dragon C205)	Success	Suborbital flight. Falcon 9 was deliberately destroyed 85 seconds in to simulate a failure at max q. Dragon capsule then separated and followed an abort procedure. Only flight of Crew Dragon C205.
114	18 March 2020	12:16	Falcon 9 Block 5	1048‑5	Starlink 5 (v1.0)	Success	First Starlink launch from LC-39A.
115	22 April 2020	19:30	Falcon 9 Block 5	1051‑4	Starlink 6 (v1.0)	Success	
116	30 May 2020	19:22	Falcon 9 Block 5	1058‑1	Crew Dragon Demo-2 (Dragon Endeavour)	Success	Maiden crewed flight of a Falcon 9 and the first crewed flight from the United States since STS-135 in 2011, carrying astronauts Bob Behnken and Doug Hurley to the ISS. Maiden flight of Crew Dragon Endeavour.
117	7 August 2020	05:12	Falcon 9 Block 5	1051‑5	Starlink 9 (v1.0)	Success	
118	3 September 2020	12:46	Falcon 9 Block 5	1060‑2	Starlink 11 (v1.0)	Success	
119	6 October 2020	11:29	Falcon 9 Block 5	1058‑3	Starlink 12 (v1.0)	Success	
120	18 October 2020	12:25	Falcon 9 Block 5	1051‑6	Starlink 13 (v1.0)	Success	
121	16 November 2020	00:27	Falcon 9 Block 5	1061‑1	SpaceX Crew-1 (Dragon Resilience)	Success	First crew rotation mission of the Commercial Crew Program to the ISS and maiden flight of Crew Dragon Resilience.
122	6 December 2020	16:17	Falcon 9 Block 5	1058‑4	SpaceX CRS-21	Success	ISS resupply flight. Launched and delivered the Nanoracks Bishop Airlock. Maiden flight of Cargo Dragon 2.
123	19 December 2020	14:00	Falcon 9 Block 5	1059‑5	NROL-108	Success	NRO launch. Two reported Starshield satellites, also known as USA-312 and USA-313.
124	20 January 2021	13:02	Falcon 9 Block 5	1051‑8	Starlink 16 (v1.0)	Success	
125	4 March 2021	08:24	Falcon 9 Block 5	1049‑8	Starlink 17 (v1.0)	Success	
126	14 March 2021	10:01	Falcon 9 Block 5	1051‑9	Starlink 21 (v1.0)	Success	
127	23 April 2021	09:49	Falcon 9 Block 5	1061‑2	SpaceX Crew-2 (Dragon Endeavour)	Success	ISS crew rotation flight.
128	4 May 2021	19:01	Falcon 9 Block 5	1049‑9	Starlink 25 (v1.0)	Success	
129	15 May 2021	22:56	Falcon 9 Block 5	1058‑8	Starlink 25 (v1.0)	Success	
130	3 June 2021	17:29	Falcon 9 Block 5	1067‑1	SpaceX CRS-22	Success	ISS resupply flight. Launched and delivered the first set of iROSA solar panels.
131	29 August 2021	07:14	Falcon 9 Block 5	1061‑4	SpaceX CRS-23	Success	ISS resupply flight.
132	16 September 2021	00:02	Falcon 9 Block 5	1062‑3	Inspiration4 (Dragon Resilience)	Success	First private crewed orbital spaceflight, being commanded by entrepreneur Jared Isaacman. First non-ISS American crewed spaceflight since STS-125 in 2009, first splashdown in the Atlantic Ocean since Apollo 9 in 1969, and set highest crewed altitude record since STS-103 in 1999.
133	11 November 2021	02:03	Falcon 9 Block 5	1067‑2	SpaceX Crew-3 (Dragon Endurance)	Success	ISS crew rotation flight. Maiden flight of Crew Dragon Endurance.
134	9 December 2021	06:00	Falcon 9 Block 5	1061‑5	Imaging X-ray Polarimetry Explorer	Success	Part of the Explorers Program. Launch consisted of three identical telescope tasked with x-ray astronomy.
135	21 December 2021	10:06	Falcon 9 Block 5	1069‑1	SpaceX CRS-24	Success	ISS resupply flight.
136	6 January 2022	21:49	Falcon 9 Block 5	1062‑4	Starlink Group 4–5	Success	
137	19 January 2022	02:02	Falcon 9 Block 5	1060‑10	Starlink Group 4–6	Success	
138	3 February 2022	18:13	Falcon 9 Block 5	1061‑6	Starlink Group 4–7	Success	
139	3 March 2022	14:25	Falcon 9 Block 5	1060‑11	Starlink Group 4–9	Success	
140	8 April 2022	15:17	Falcon 9 Block 5	1062‑5	Axiom Mission 1 (Dragon Endeavour)	Success	Docking with the ISS. First private crewed flight to the ISS.
141	27 April 2022	07:52	Falcon 9 Block 5	1067‑4	SpaceX Crew-4 (Dragon Freedom)	Success	ISS crew rotation flight. Maiden flight of Crew Dragon Freedom.
142	6 May 2022	09:46	Falcon 9 Block 5	1058‑12	Starlink Group 4–17	Success	
143	18 May 2022	10:59	Falcon 9 Block 5	1052‑5	Starlink Group 4–18	Success	
144	17 June 2022	16:09	Falcon 9 Block 5	1060‑13	Starlink Group 4–19	Success	
145	15 July 2022	00:44	Falcon 9 Block 5	1067‑5	SpaceX CRS-25	Success	ISS resupply flight.
146	24 July 2022	13:38	Falcon 9 Block 5	1062‑8	Starlink Group 4–25	Success	
147	10 August 2022	02:14	Falcon 9 Block 5	1073‑3	Starlink Group 4–26	Success	
148	11 September 2022	01:20	Falcon 9 Block 5	1058‑14	Starlink Group 4–20	Success	
149	5 October 2022	16:00	Falcon 9 Block 5	1077‑1	SpaceX Crew-5 (Dragon Endurance)	Success	ISS crew rotation flight.
150	1 November 2022	13:41	Falcon Heavy	1066 (core); 1064‑1, 1065‑1 (sides)	USSF-44	Success	Launch for the United States Space Force. Eight technology demonstration satellites, also known as USA-339, 340, 341, 344, 399, 546, 547, and 548. Core stage expended.
151	26 November 2022	19:20	Falcon 9 Block 5	1076‑1	SpaceX CRS-26	Success	ISS resupply flight. Launched and delivered the second set of iROSA solar panels.
152	8 December 2022	22:27	Falcon 9 Block 5	1069‑4	OneWeb Flight #15	Success	
153	17 December 2022	21:32	Falcon 9 Block 5	1058‑15	Starlink Group 4–37	Success	
154	15 January 2023	22:56	Falcon Heavy	1070 (core); 1064‑2, 1065‑2 (sides)	USSF-67	Success	Launch for the United States Space Force. CBAS satellite, also known as USA-342. Core stage expended.
155	2 February 2023	07:58	Falcon 9 Block 5	1069‑5	Starlink Group 5–3	Success	
156	2 March 2023	05:34	Falcon 9 Block 5	1078‑1	SpaceX Crew-6 (Dragon Endeavour)	Success	ISS crew rotation flight.
157	15 March 2023	00:30	Falcon 9 Block 5	1073‑7	SpaceX CRS-27	Success	ISS resupply flight.
158	1 May 2023	00:26	Falcon Heavy	1068 (core); 1052‑8, 1053‑3 (sides)	ViaSat-3 Americas	Success	Heaviest all-electric satellite launched into orbit. All three boosters expended.
159	21 May 2023	21:37	Falcon 9 Block 5	1080‑1	Axiom Mission 2 (Dragon Freedom)	Success	Private crewed docking to the ISS.
160	5 June 2023	15:47	Falcon 9 Block 5	1077‑5	SpaceX CRS-28	Success	ISS resupply flight. Launched and delivered the third set of iROSA solar panels.
161	29 July 2023	03:04	Falcon Heavy	1074 (core); 1064‑3, 1065‑3 (sides)	EchoStar-24	Success	Heaviest geostationary satellite ever launched. Core stage expended.
162	26 August 2023	07:27	Falcon 9 Block 5	1081‑1	SpaceX Crew-7 (Dragon Endurance)	Success	ISS crew rotation flight.
163	4 September 2023	02:47	Falcon 9 Block 5	1073‑10	Starlink Group 6–12	Success	
164	13 October 2023	14:19	Falcon Heavy	1079 (core); 1064‑4, 1065‑4 (sides)	Psyche	Success	Part of the Discovery Program, aimed at studying 16 Psyche. First Falcon Heavy launch towards another celestial body. Core stage expended.
165	10 November 2023	01:28	Falcon 9 Block 5	1081‑2	SpaceX CRS-29	Success	ISS resupply flight.
166	29 December 2023	01:07	Falcon Heavy	1084 (core); 1064‑5, 1065‑5 (sides)	X-37B OTV-7	Success	Seventh flight of the X-37B. First X-37B flight to medium Earth orbit, and first flight on a Falcon Heavy. Core stage expended.
167	18 January 2024	21:49	Falcon 9 Block 5	1080‑5	Axiom Mission 3 (Dragon Freedom)	Success	Private crewed docking to the ISS.
168	29 January 2024	01:10	Falcon 9 Block 5	1062‑18	Starlink Group 6–38	Success	
169	15 February 2024	06:05	Falcon 9 Block 5	1060‑18	IM-1	Success	Part of the Commercial Lunar Payload Services program. First launch of Intuitive Machines' Nova-C Lunar lander. Second mission and first successful flight of the program. First launch to the Moon from 39A since Apollo 17 in 1972.
170	4 March 2024	03:53	Falcon 9 Block 5	1083‑1	SpaceX Crew-8 (Dragon Endeavour)	Success	ISS crew rotation flight.
171	16 March 2024	00:21	Falcon 9 Block 5	1062‑19	Starlink Group 6–44	Success	
172	24 March 2024	03:09	Falcon 9 Block 5	1060‑19	Starlink Group 6–42	Success	
173	30 March 2024	21:52	Falcon 9 Block 5	1076‑12	Eutelsat 36D	Success	
174	7 April 2024	23:16	Falcon 9 Block 5	1073‑14	Bandwagon-1	Success	First SpaceX dedicated rideshare mission from LC-39A.
175	17 April 2024	21:26	Falcon 9 Block 5	1077‑12	Starlink Group 6–51	Success	
176	28 April 2024	00:34	Falcon 9 Block 5	1060‑20	Galileo-L12	Success	Part of the Galileo satellite navigation system. First Gallileo launch from the United States, following development issues with Ariane 6. First stage expended.
177	8 May 2024	18:42	Falcon 9 Block 5	1083‑3	Starlink Group 6–56	Success	
178	24 May 2024	02:45	Falcon 9 Block 5	1077‑13	Starlink Group 6–63	Success	
179	25 June 2024	21:26	Falcon Heavy	1087 (core); 1072‑1, 1086‑1 (sides)	GOES-19	Success	Part of the Geostationary Operational Environmental Satellite system of satellites. Launched as GOES-U. First GOES launch on a SpaceX rocket. Core stage expended.
180	27 July 2024	05:45	Falcon 9 Block 5	1069‑17	Starlink Group 10–9	Success	
181	2 August 2024	05:01	Falcon 9 Block 5	1078‑12	Starlink Group 10–6	Success	
182	12 August 2024	10:37	Falcon 9 Block 5	1073‑17	Starlink Group 10–7	Success	
183	10 September 2024	09:23	Falcon 9 Block 5	1083‑4	Polaris Dawn (Dragon Resilience)	Success	First mission of the private Polaris Program, commanded by Jared Isaacman. First ever private spacewalk, conducted by Isaacman and Sarah Gillis. Set non-Lunar crewed altitude record, surpassing Gemini 11 in 1966, and contributed to current record of most people in orbit, at 19.
184	14 October 2024	16:06	Falcon Heavy	1089 (core); 1064‑6, 1065‑6 (sides)	Europa Clipper	Success	Part of the Large Strategic Science Missions, aimed at studying Jupiter and its moon Europa through performing successive close-proximity flybys. First Falcon Heavy launch to another planet. All three boosters expended.
185	5 November 2024	02:29	Falcon 9 Block 5	1083‑5	SpaceX CRS-31	Success	ISS resupply flight.
186	11 November 2024	17:22	Falcon 9 Block 5	1067‑23	Koreasat 6A	Success	
187	17 November 2024	22:28	Falcon 9 Block 5	1077‑16	Optus-X/TD7	Success	
188	27 November 2024	04:41	Falcon 9 Block 5	1078‑15	Starlink Group 6–76	Success	
189	5 December 2024	16:10	Falcon 9 Block 5	1076‑19	SXM-9	Success	
190	17 December 2024	22:26	Falcon 9 Block 5	1090‑1	O3b mPOWER 7 & 8	Success	
191	23 December 2024	05:35	Falcon 9 Block 5	1080‑14	Starlink Group 12–2	Success	
192	31 December 2024	05:39	Falcon 9 Block 5	1078‑16	Starlink Group 12–6	Success	
193	8 January 2025	15:27	Falcon 9 Block 5	1086‑3	Starlink Group 12–11	Success	
194	15 January 2025	06:11	Falcon 9 Block 5	1085‑5	Blue Ghost Mission 1 /Hakuto-R Mission 2	Success	Part of the Commercial Lunar Payload Services program for Blue Ghost, private mission for Hakuto-R. First launch of Firefly Aerospace's Blue Ghost and second launch of ispace's Hakuto-R Lunar landers. Blue Ghost became first completely successful CLPS mission. Hakuto-R crashed into lunar surface during final descent.
195	21 January 2025	05:24	Falcon 9 Block 5	1083‑8	Starlink Group 13–1	Success	
196	30 January 2025	01:34	Falcon 9 Block 5	1073‑21	Spainsat NG I	Success	First stage expended.
197	4 February 2025	23:13	Falcon 9 Block 5	1086‑4	WorldView Legion 5 & 6	Success	
198	27 February 2025	00:16	Falcon 9 Block 5	1083‑9	IM-2	Success	Part of the Commercial Lunar Payload Services program. Second flight of Nova-C. Flight contained secondary payloads Lunar Trailblazer, Brokkr-2, and Chimera-1.
199	14 March 2025	23:03	Falcon 9 Block 5	1069‑22	SpaceX Crew-10 (Dragon Endurance)	Success	ISS crew rotation flight.
200	1 April 2025	01:46	Falcon 9 Block 5	1085‑6	Fram2 (Dragon Resilience)	Success	Private crewed mission, commanded by Chun Wang. First ever crewed mission to go into polar orbit, and first polar launch from LC-39A.
201	13 April 2025	00:53	Falcon 9 Block 5	1083‑10	Starlink Group 12–17	Success	
202	21 April 2025	08:15	Falcon 9 Block 5	1092‑3	SpaceX CRS-32	Success	ISS resupply flight.
203	29 April 2025	02:34	Falcon 9 Block 5	1094‑1	Starlink Group 12–10	Success	
204	4 May 2025	08:54	Falcon 9 Block 5	1078‑20	Starlink Group 6–84	Success	
205	13 May 2025	05:02	Falcon 9 Block 5	1067‑28	Starlink Group 6–83	Success	
206	28 May 2025	13:30	Falcon 9 Block 5	1080‑19	Starlink Group 10–32	Success	
207	25 June 2025	06:31	Falcon 9 Block 5	1094‑2	Axiom Mission 4 (Dragon Grace)	Success	Private crewed docking to the ISS. Maiden flight of Crew Dragon Grace.
208	1 July 2025	21:04	Falcon 9 Block 5	1085‑9	MTG-S1/Sentinel-4A	Success	Part of ESA's Copernicus Programme series of earth observation satellites. First Sentinel launch from Florida.
209	1 August 2025	15:43	Falcon 9 Block 5	1094‑3	SpaceX Crew-11 (Dragon Endeavour)	Success	ISS crew rotation flight. Final Falcon 9 landing at LZ-1.
210	22 August 2025	03:50	Falcon 9 Block 5	1092‑6	X-37B OTV-8	Success	Eighth flight of the Boeing X-37B, also known as USSF-36. Third launch from Falcon.
211	28 August 2025	08:12	Falcon 9 Block 5	1067‑30	Starlink Group 10–11	Success	First time a booster reached 30 flights.
212	5 September 2025	12:32	Falcon 9 Block 5	1069‑27	Starlink Group 10-57	Success	
213	24 September 2025	11:30	Falcon 9 Block 5	1096‑2	Interstellar Mapping and Acceleration Probe	Success	Part of the Solar Terrestrial Probes program, designed to observe particle acceleration and solar wind interaction with the interstellar medium. Launched alongside SWFO-L1 and the Carruthers Geocorona Observatory.
214	9 November 2025	08:10	Falcon 9 Block 5	1069‑28	Starlink Group 10‑51	Success	
215	15 November 2025	03:08	Falcon 9 Block 5	1092‑8	Starlink Group 6‑89	Success	
216	21 November 2025	03:39	Falcon 9 Block 5	1080‑23	Starlink Group 6‑78	Success	
217	1 December 2025	07:44	Falcon 9 Block 5	1095‑4	Starlink Group 6‑86	Success	
218	8 December 2025	22:26	Falcon 9 Block 5	1067‑32	Starlink Group 6‑92	Success	
219	17 December 2025	13:42	Falcon 9 Block 5	1094‑6	Starlink Group 6‑99	Success	Final Falcon 9 flight at LC-39A before pad was prioritized towards Falcon Heavy and Starship launches.

===== Falcon 9 and Falcon Heavy (since 2026) =====
No.	Date	Time (UTC)	Launch Vehicle	Booster flight	Payload/mission	Result	Remarks
220	29 April 2026	14:13	Falcon Heavy	1098 (core); 1072‑2, 1075‑22 (sides)	ViaSat-3 F3	Success	Core stage expended.
221	30 August 2026	11:26	Falcon Heavy	1105 (core); 1072‑3, 1104‑1 (sides)	Nancy Grace Roman Space Telescope	Success	Part of the Large Strategic Science Missions, a space telescope designed to conduct infrared astronomy with a wide field of view, complimenting the Hubble Space Telescope and James Webb Space Telescope. Notably uses a mirror donated by the NRO to NASA in 2012. Core stage expended.
222	2 October 2026	03:54	Falcon Heavy	1106 (core); 1072‑4, 1104‑2 (sides)	NROL-97	Success	NRO launch. Unknown satellite, also known as USA-708. First Falcon Heavy launch for the National Reconnaissance Office. LZ-1 was temporarily reactivated for use thanks to LZ-40 already being occupied by SpaceX Crew-13's booster. Core stage expended.

==== Upcoming launches ====
Date	Launch vehicle	Payload
January 2027	Falcon Heavy	Griffin Mission One

=== Starship pad ===
==== Upcoming launches ====
Date	Launch vehicle	Payload
Q4 2026	Starship	Starlink Group 30-1

== Gallery ==
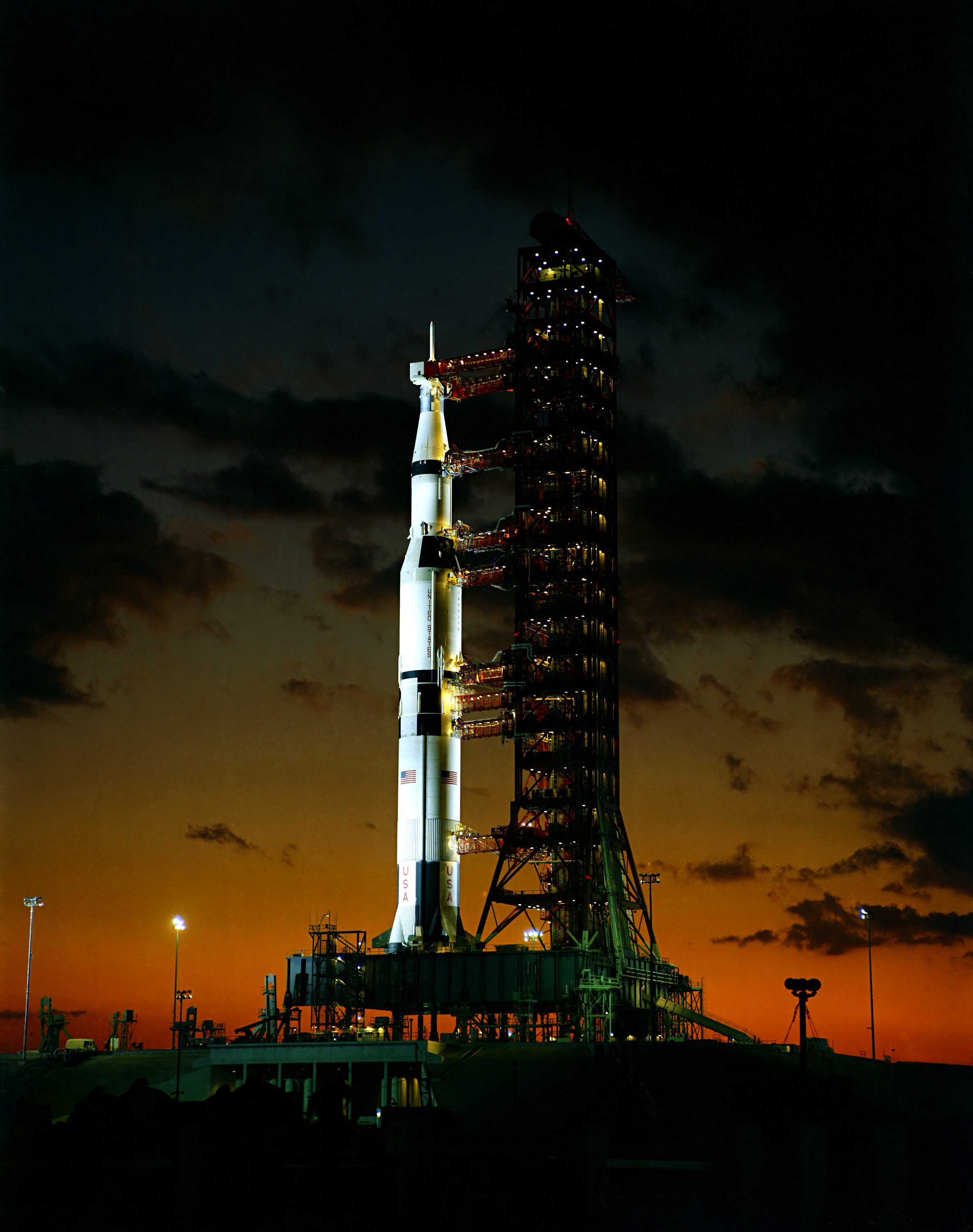
Apollo 4 on the pad at LC-39A (1967)

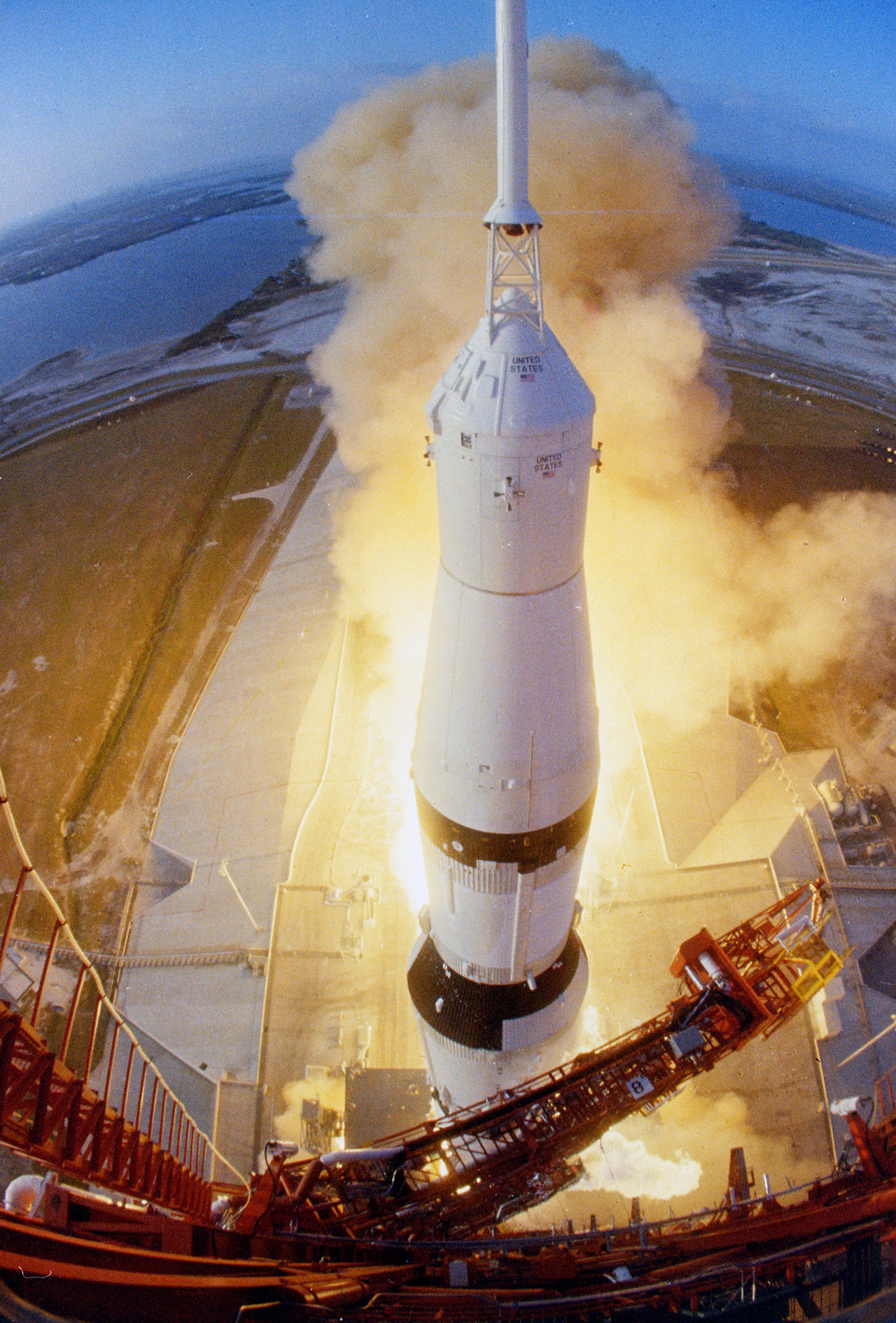
The launch of Apollo 6 viewed from the top of the LC-39A launch tower (1968)

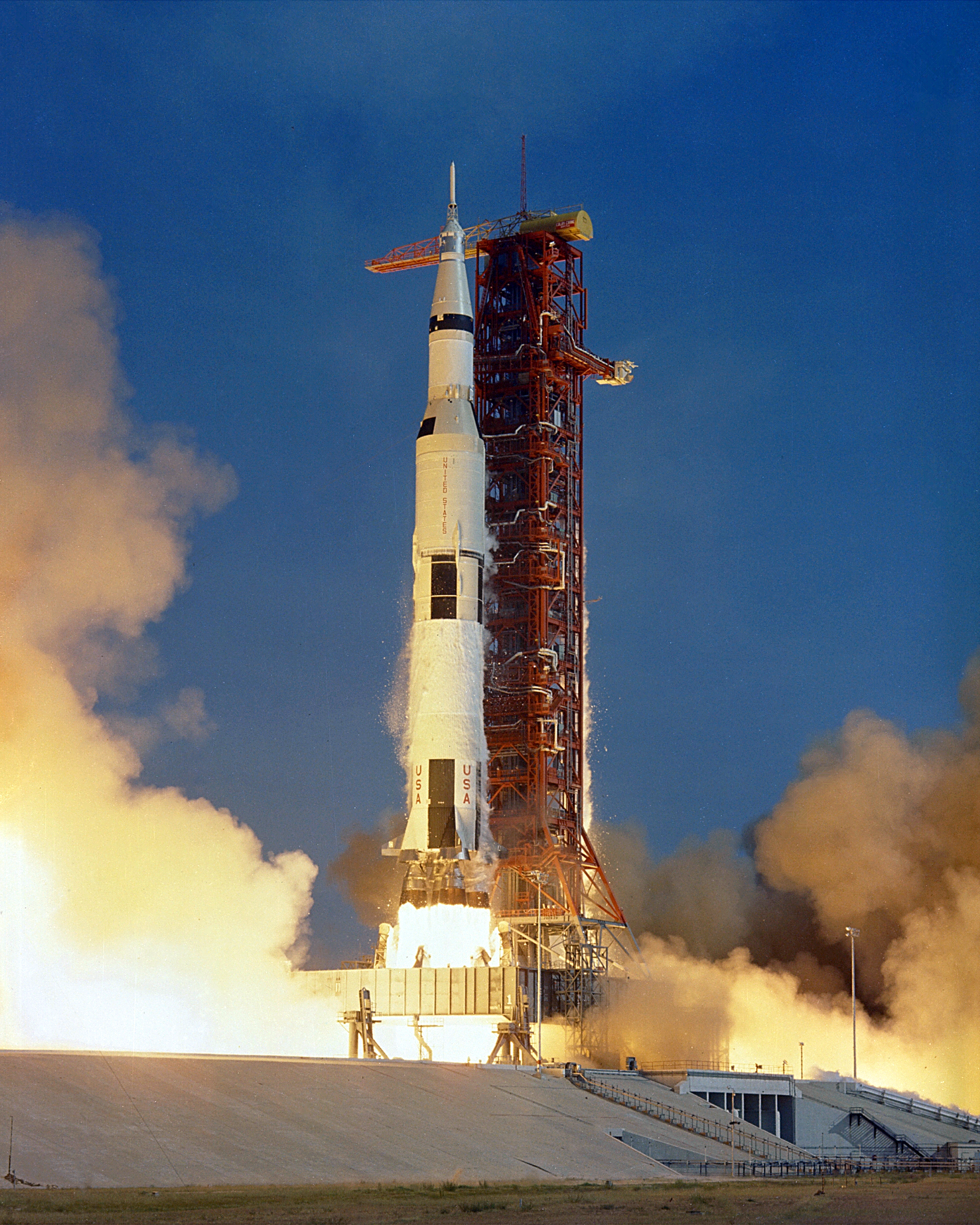
Apollo 11 launch at LC-39A (1969)

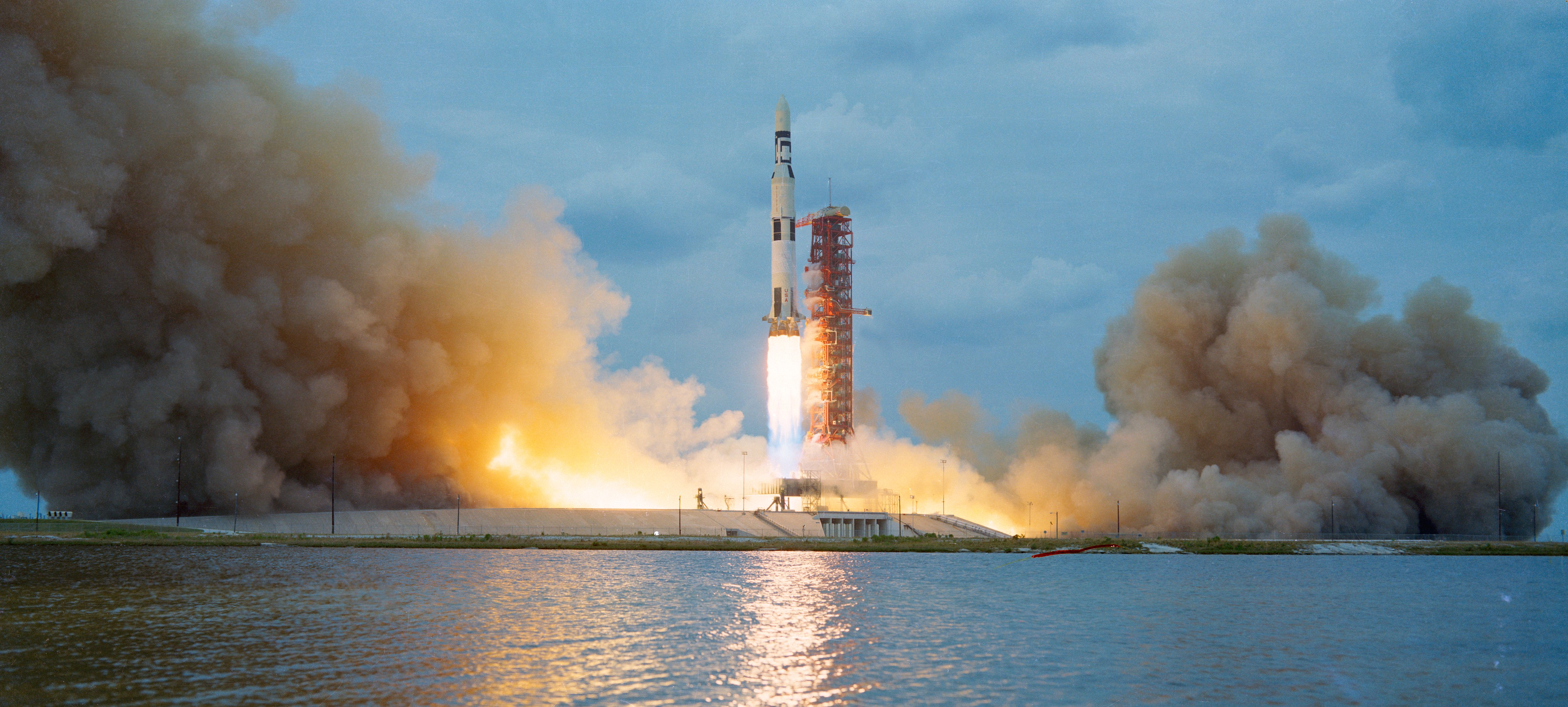
Skylab launches from LC-39A (1973)

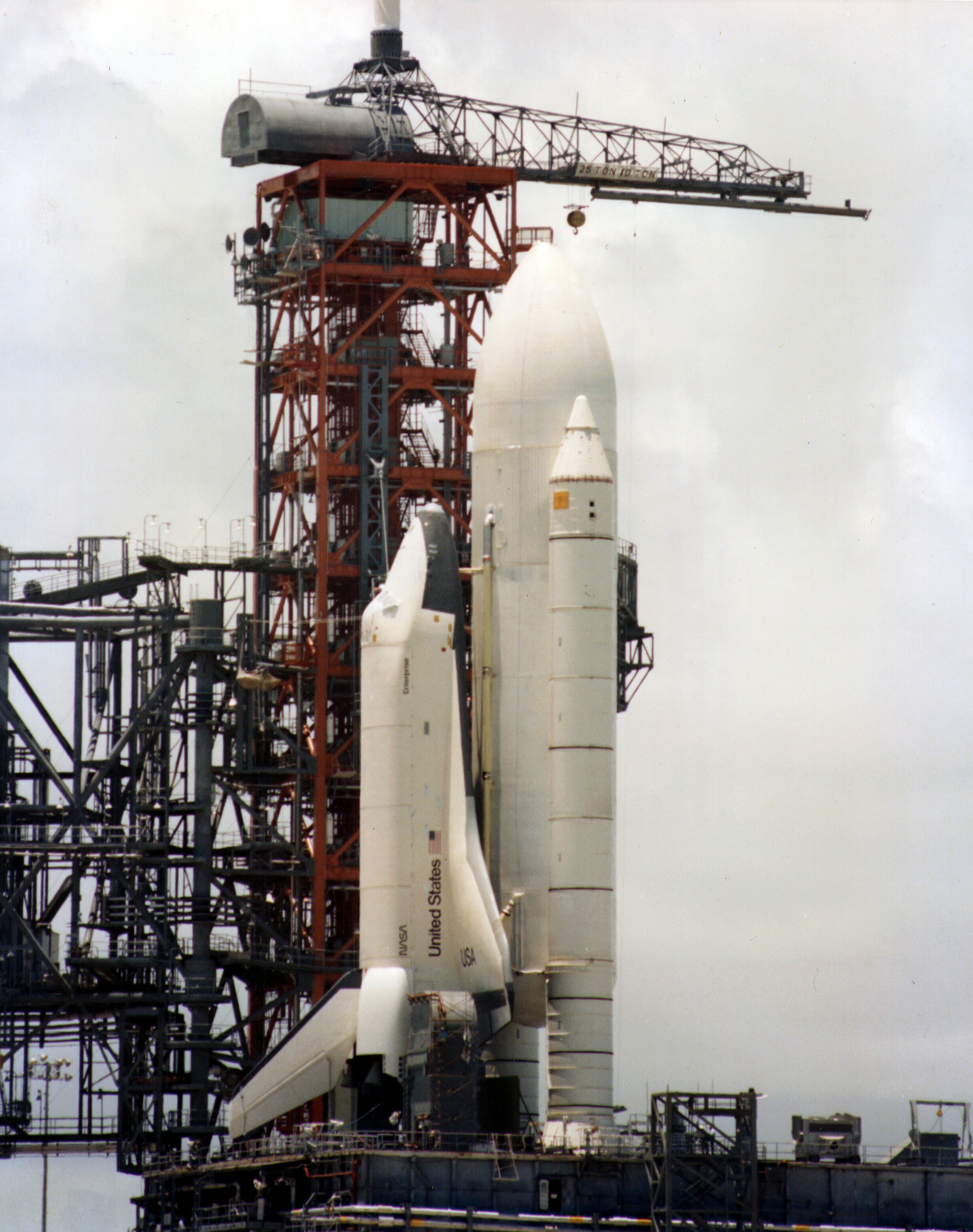
Space Shuttle Enterprise at LC-39A during the fit check tests (1979)

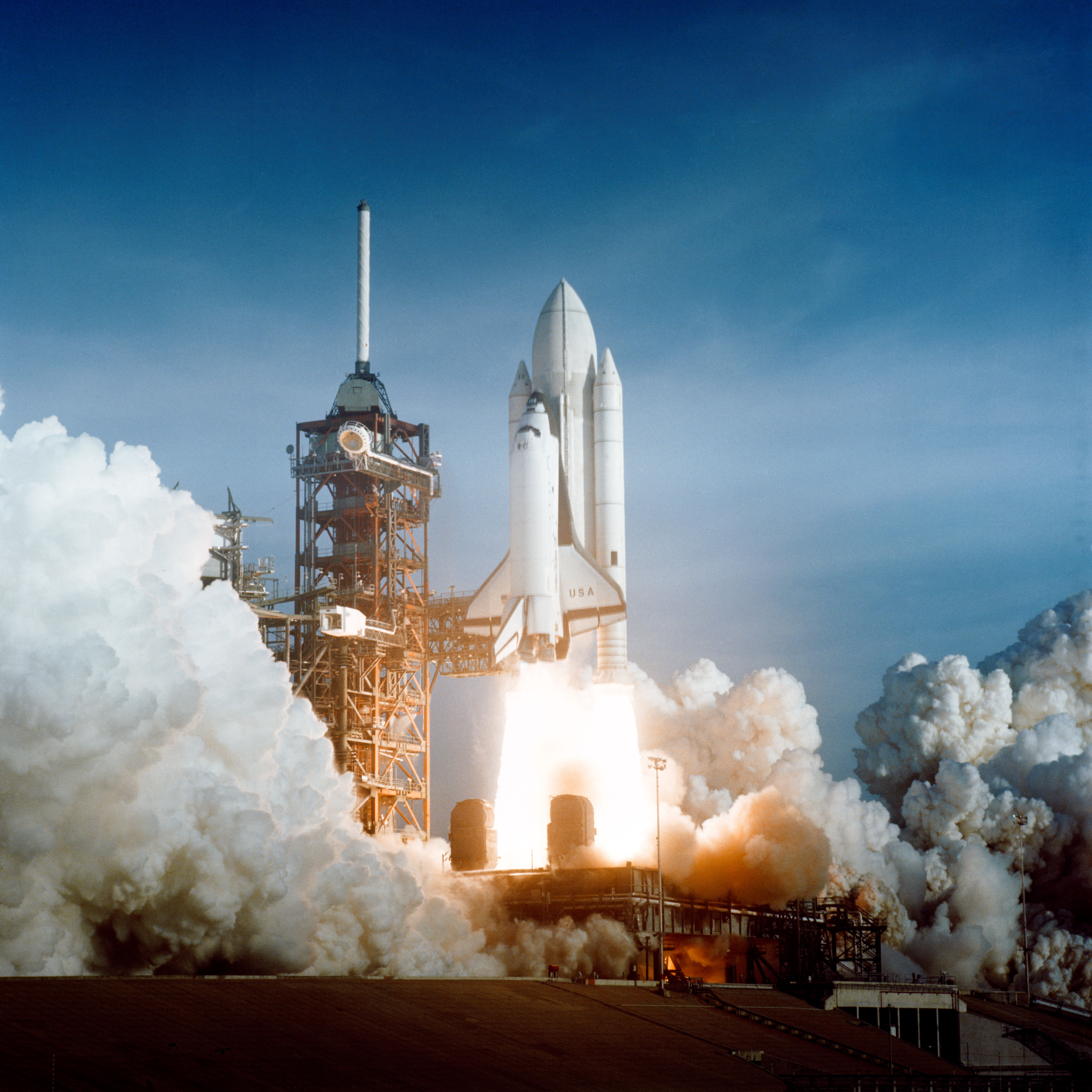
Space Shuttle Columbia launches from LC-39A on STS-1 (1981)

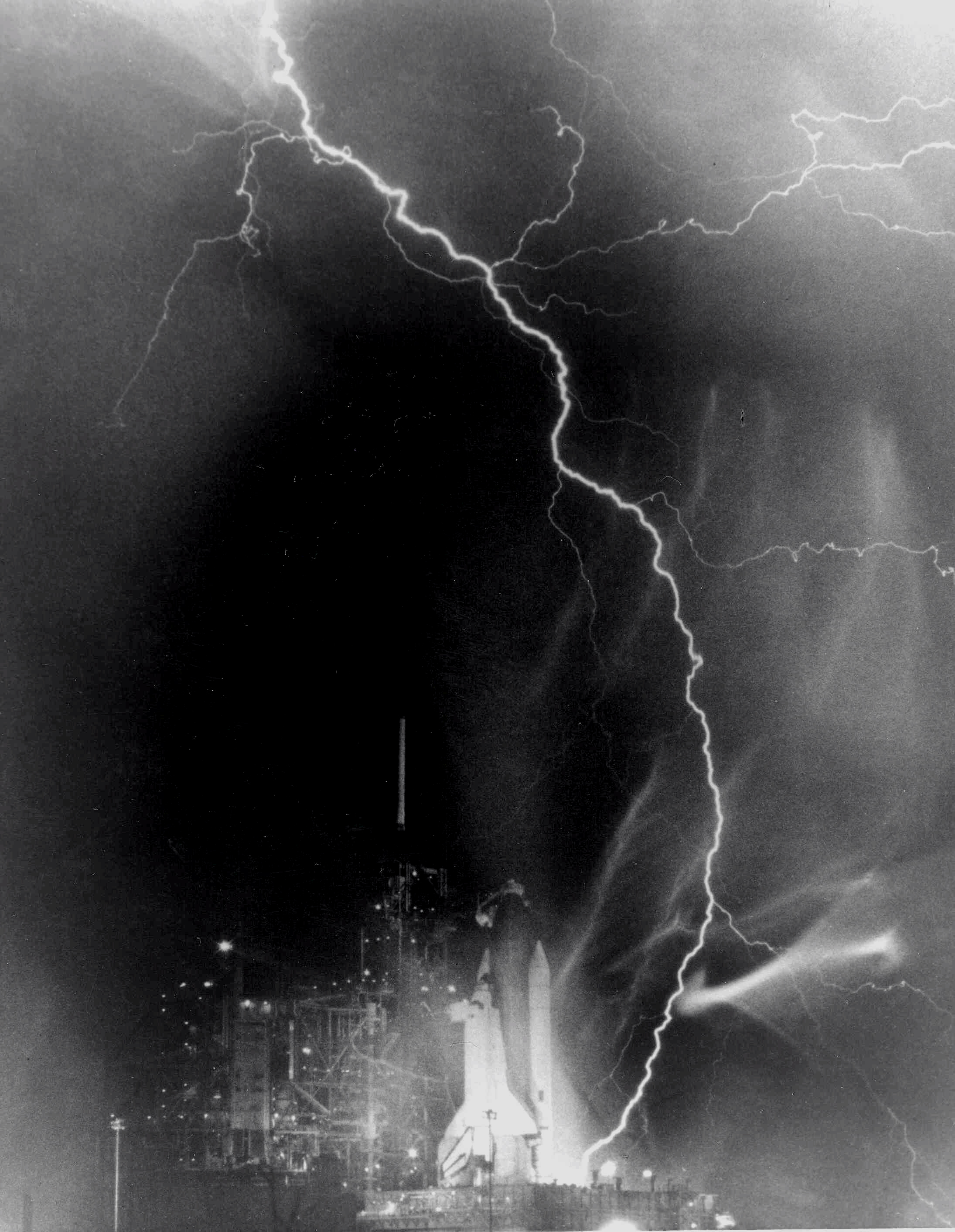
Lightning strikes LC-39A in the hours before Space Shuttle Challenger launches on STS-8 (1983)

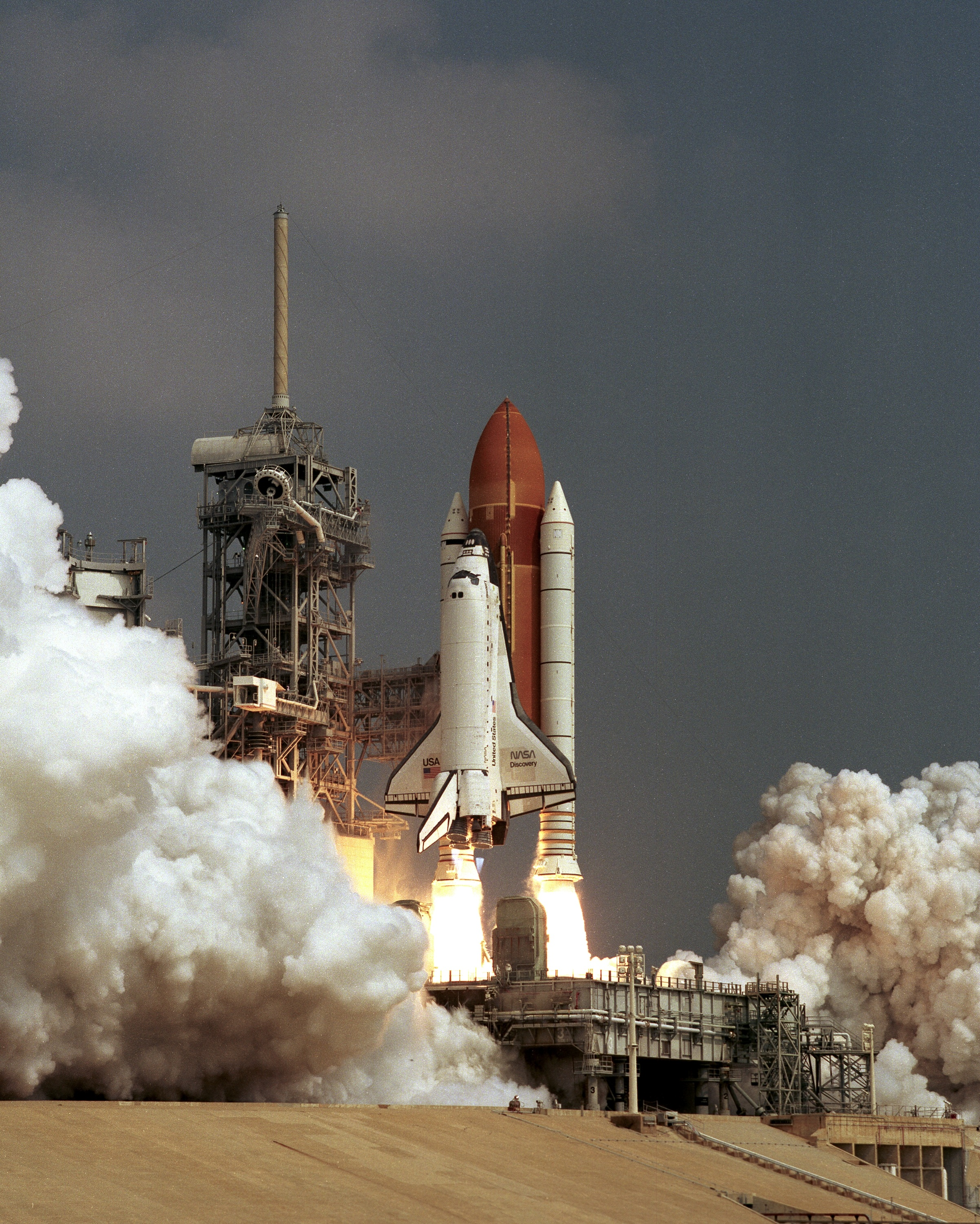
Space Shuttle Discovery launches from LC-39A on STS-85 (1997)

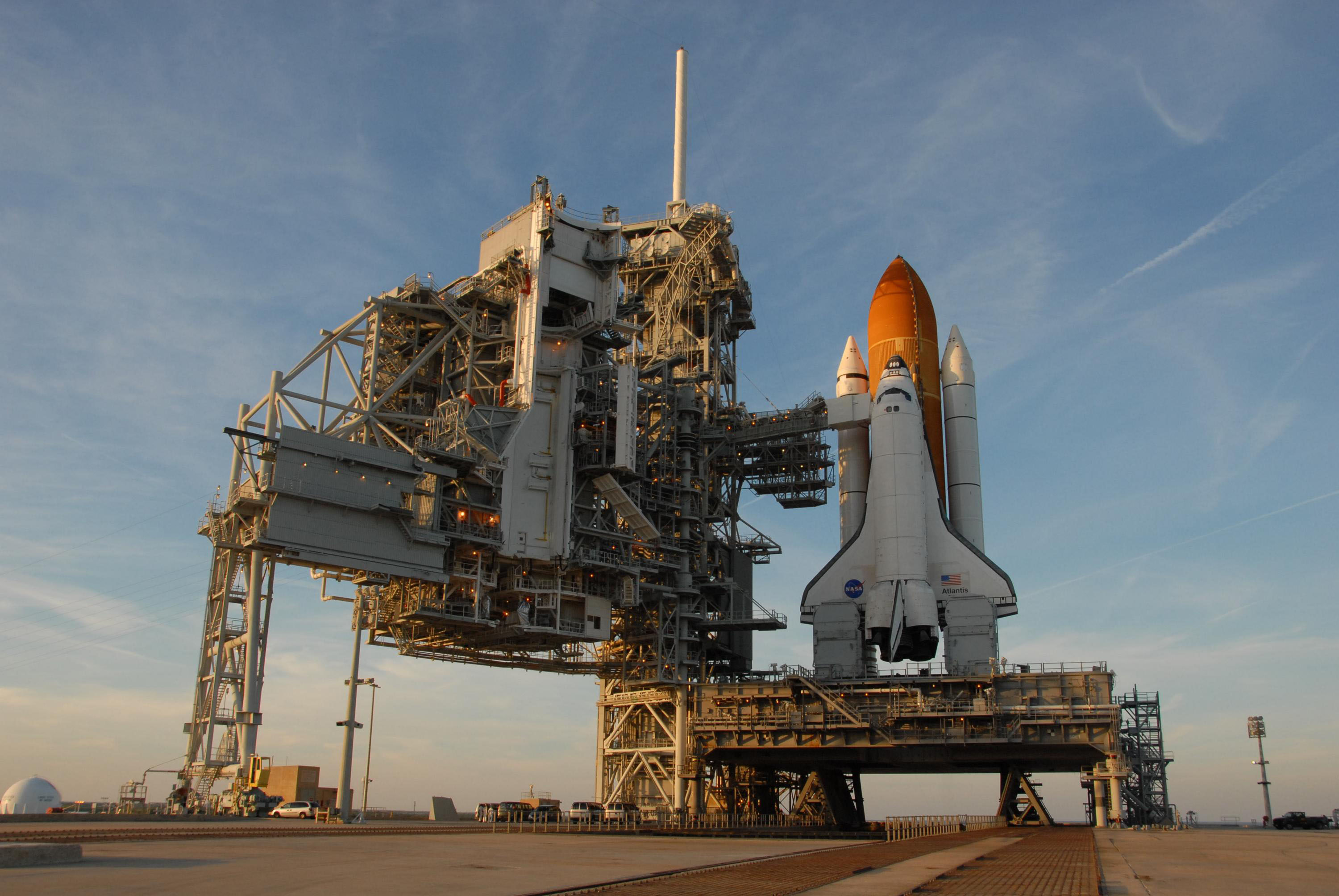
Space Shuttle Atlantis at LC-39A ahead of STS-122 (2007)

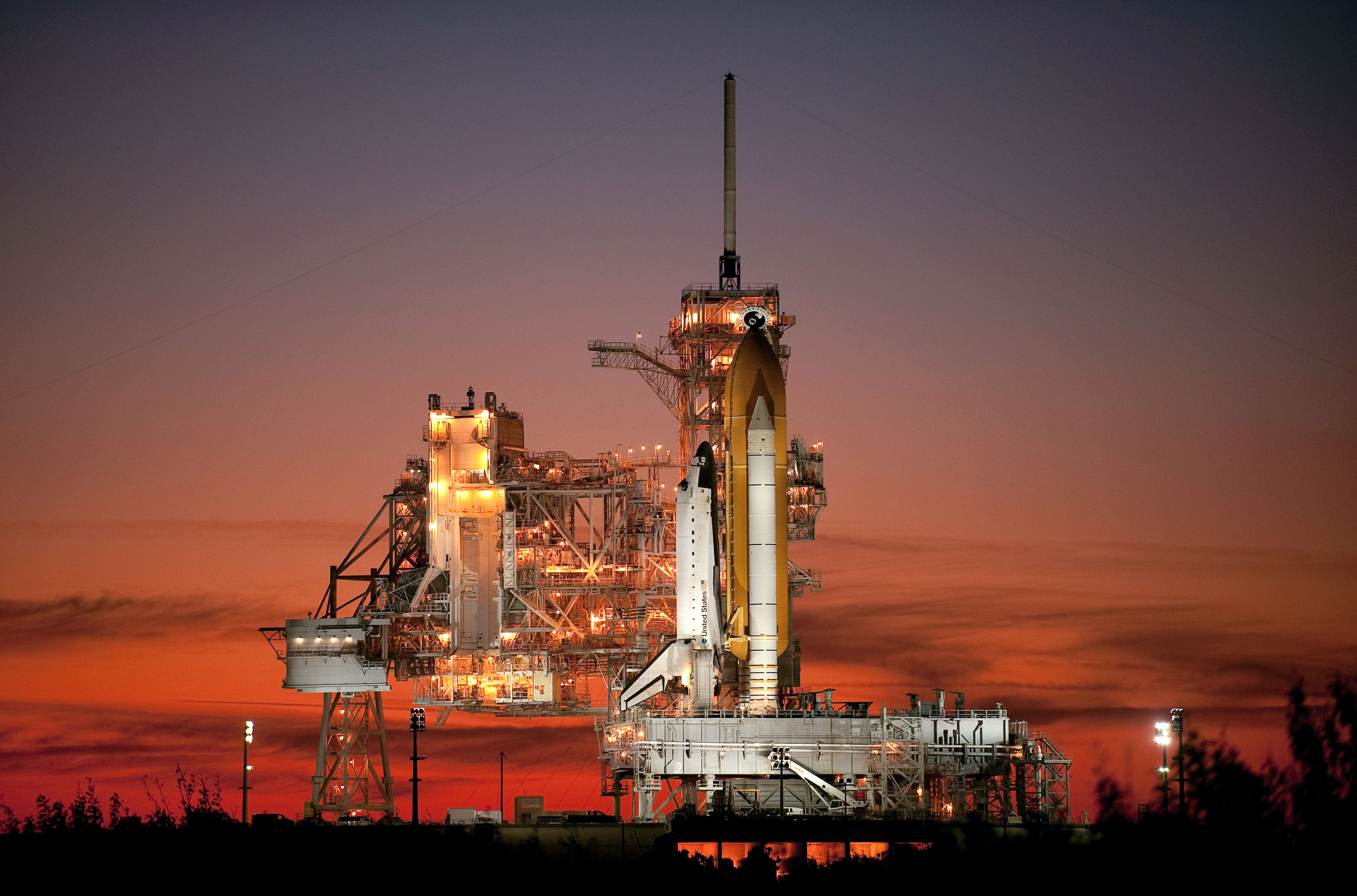
Space Shuttle Atlantis at LC-39A ahead of STS-129 (2009)

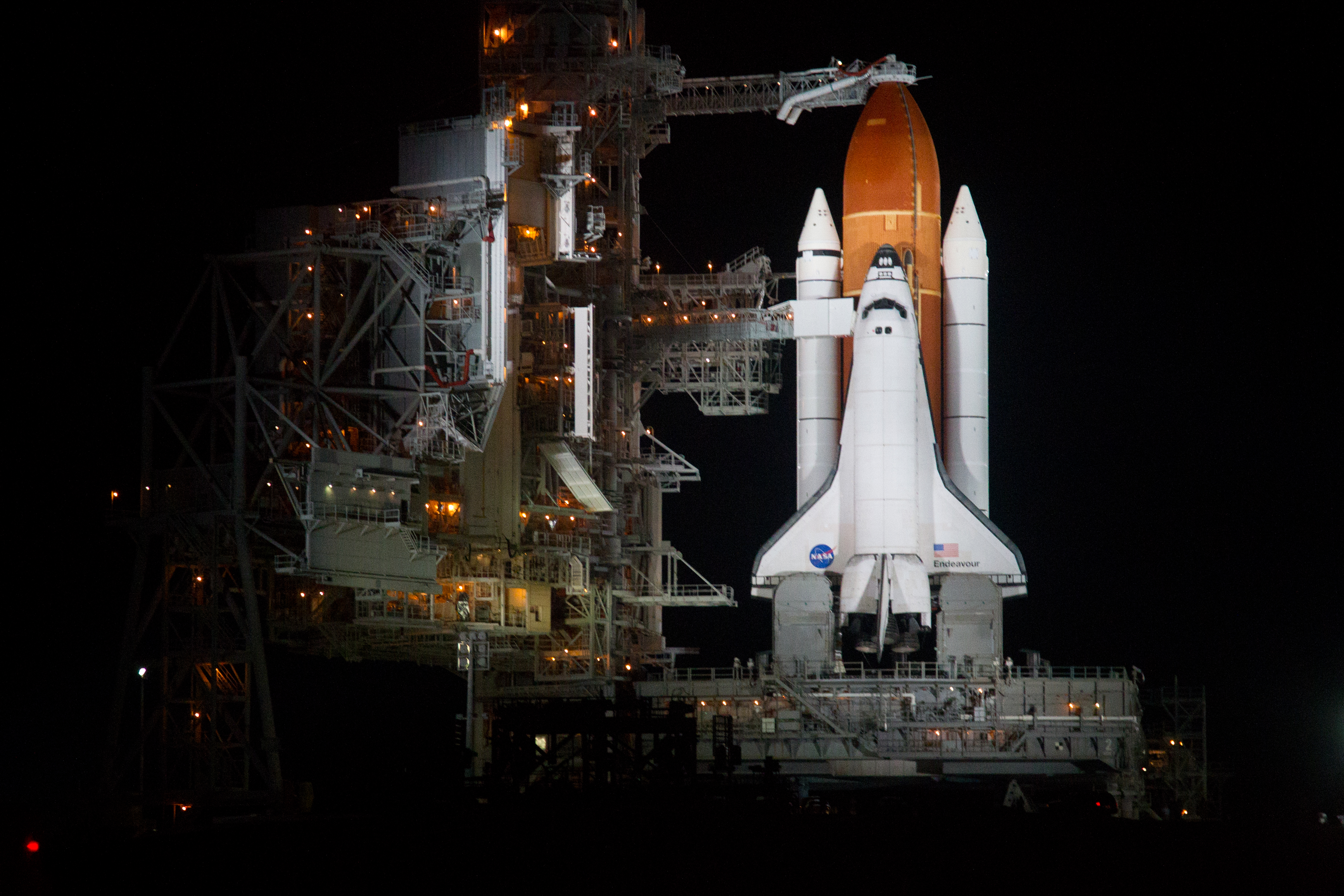
Space Shuttle Endeavour on the pad at LC-39A ahead of STS-134 (2011)

Deluge system test at pad 39A (2017)

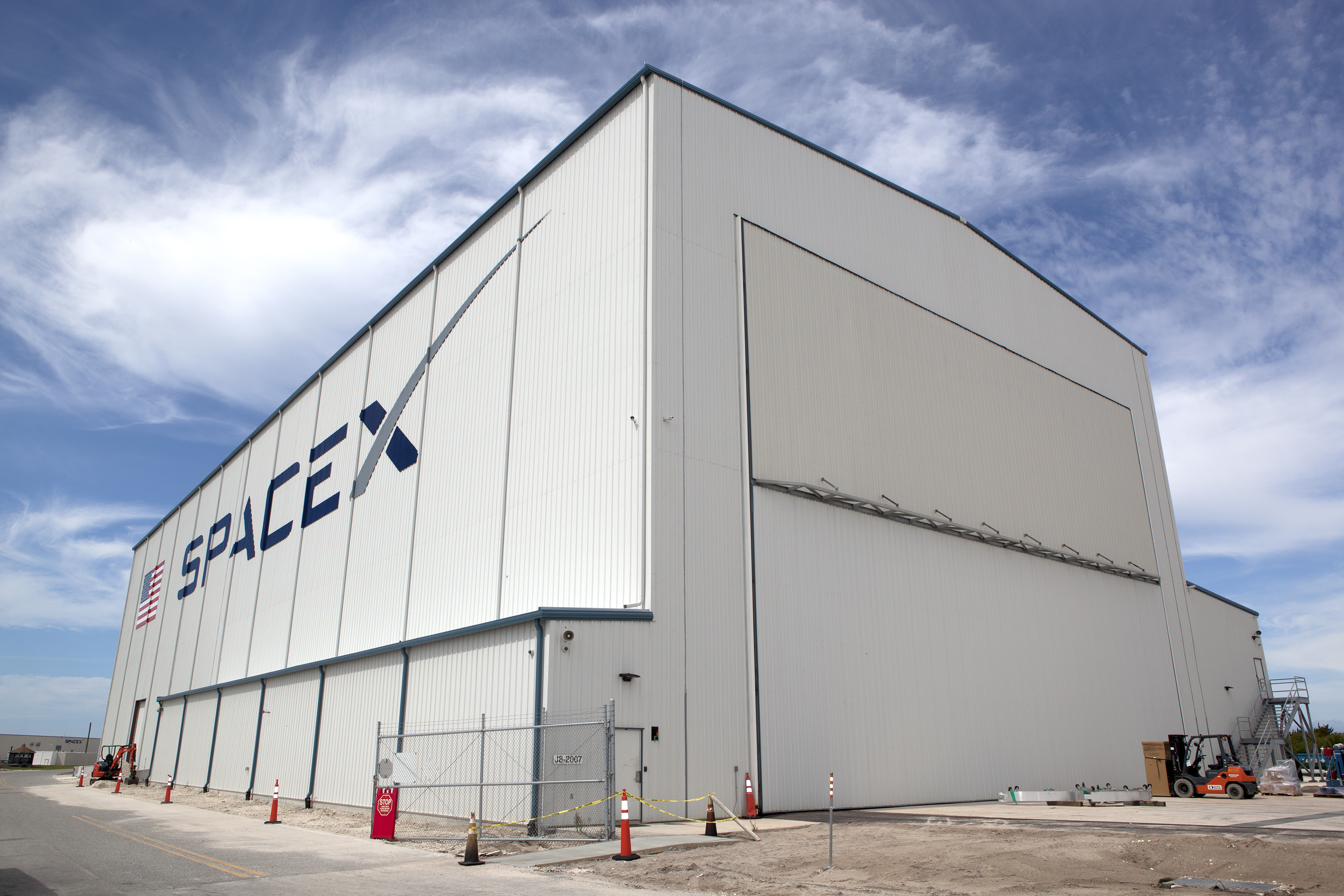
SpaceX Horizontal Integration Facility (HIF)

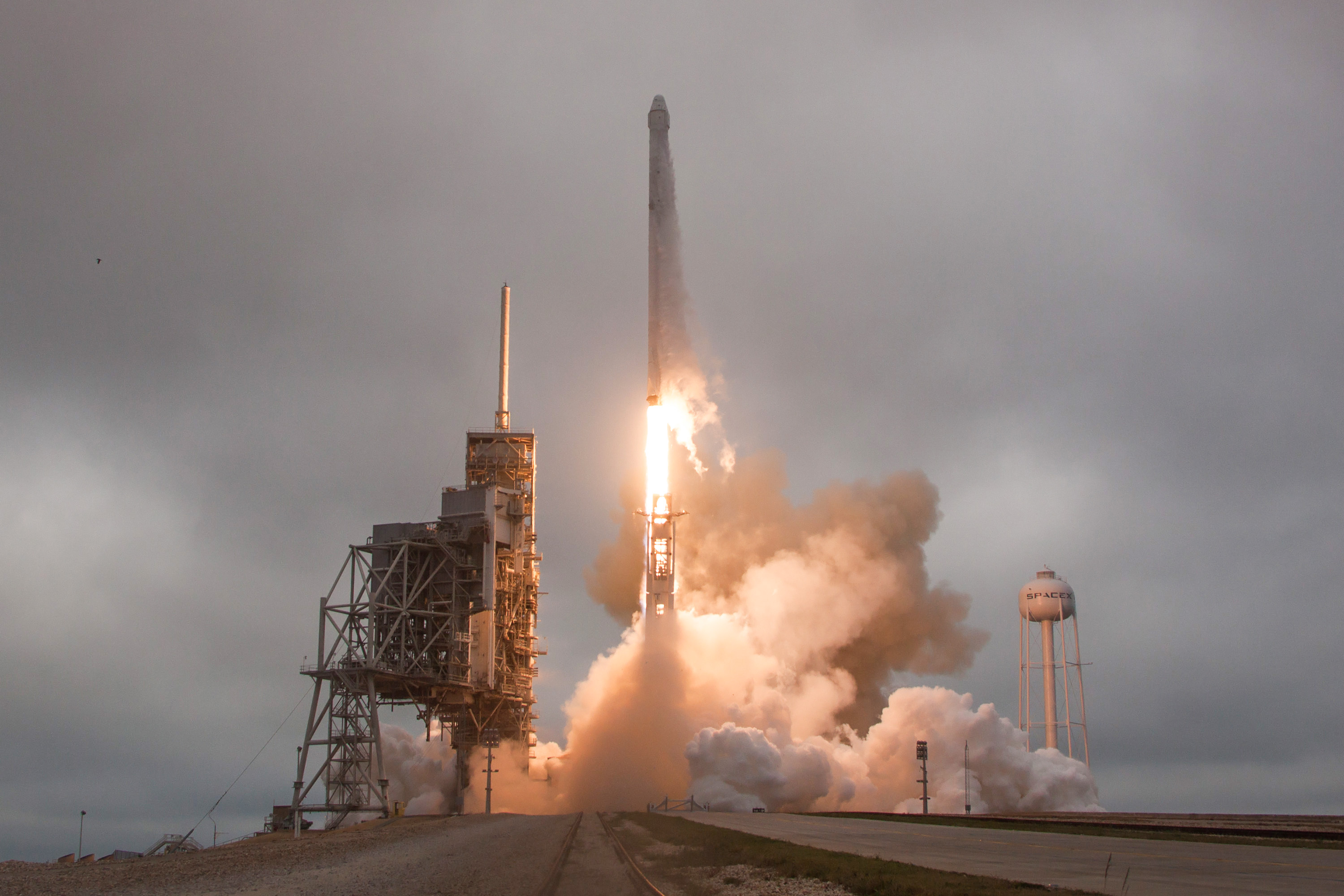
The first launch of Falcon 9 from LC-39A, on CRS-10 (2017)

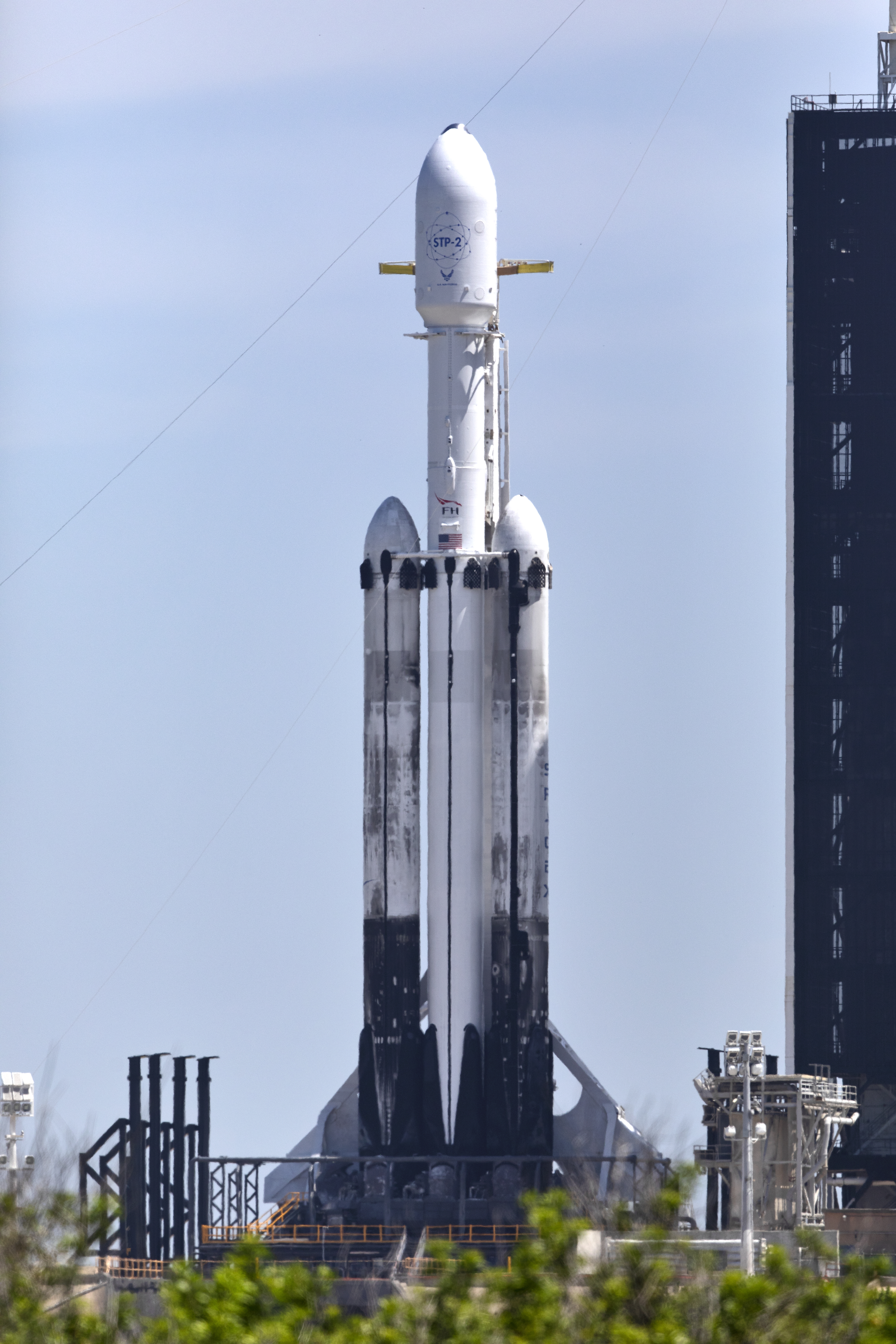
Falcon Heavy at LC-39A (2019)

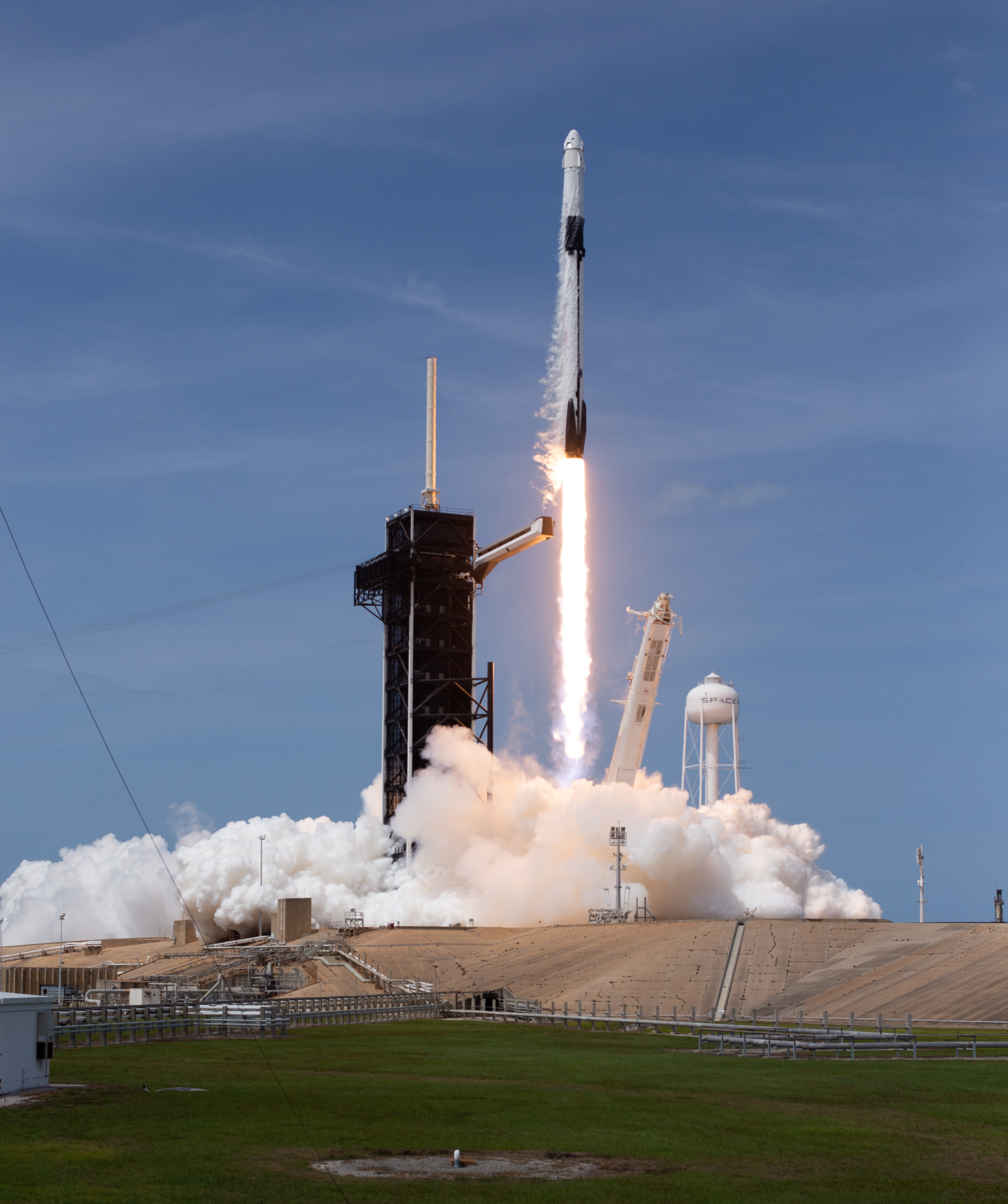
Crew Dragon Endeavour launches from LC-39A on Crew Dragon Demo-2 (2020)

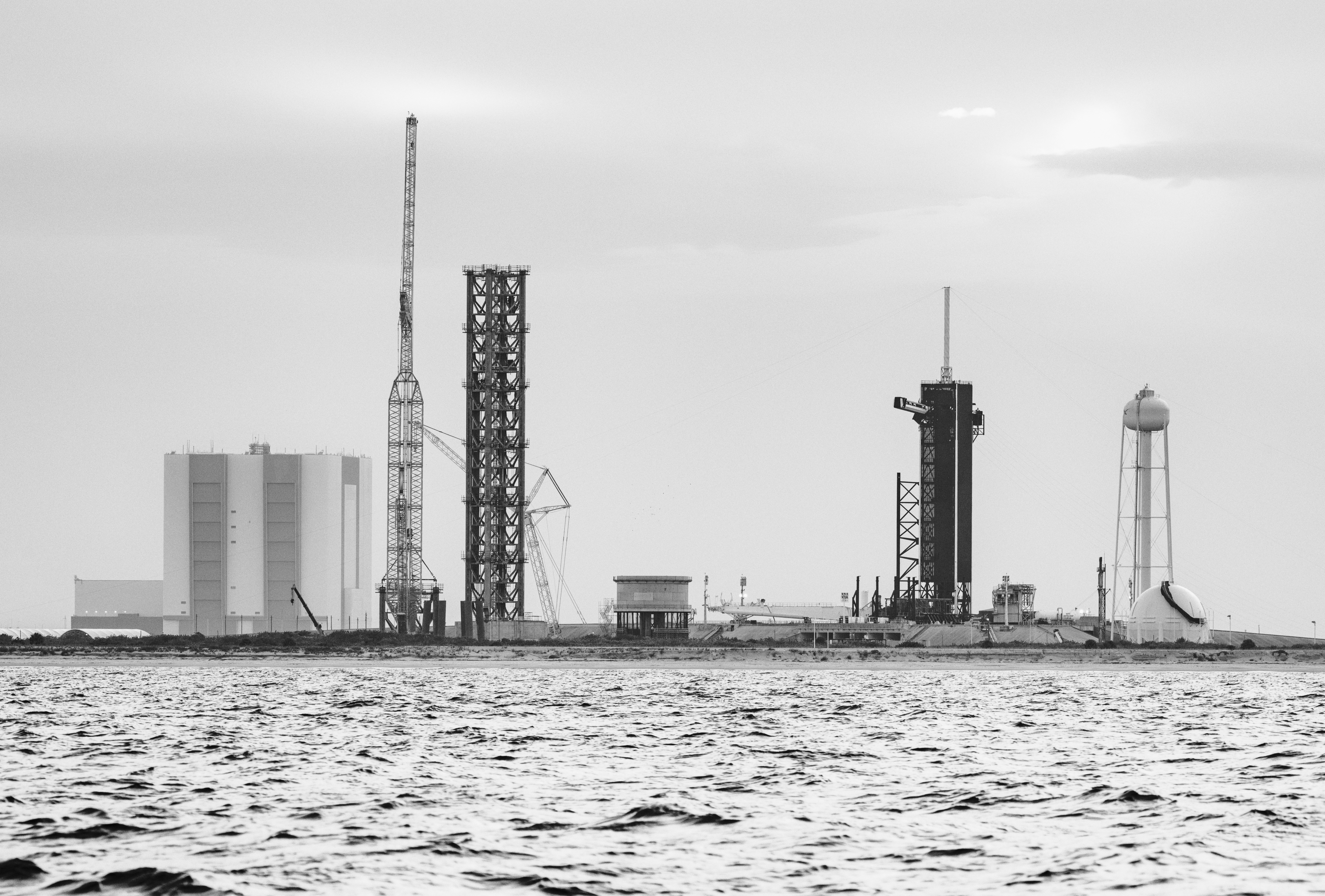
Construction of the future launch tower for the dedicated SpaceX Starship launch pad at LC-39A (2022)

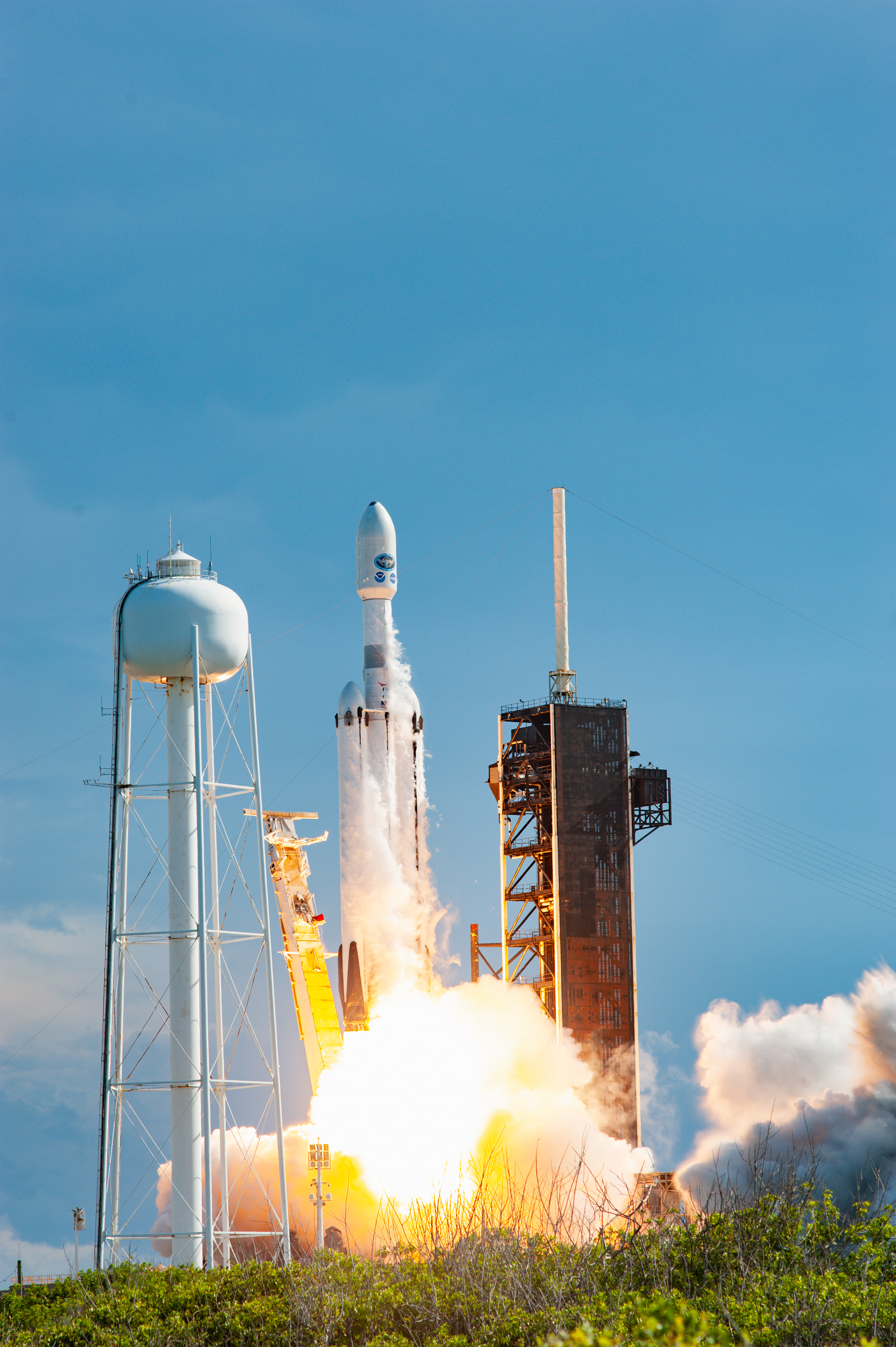
A Falcon Heavy launches from LC-39A (2024)

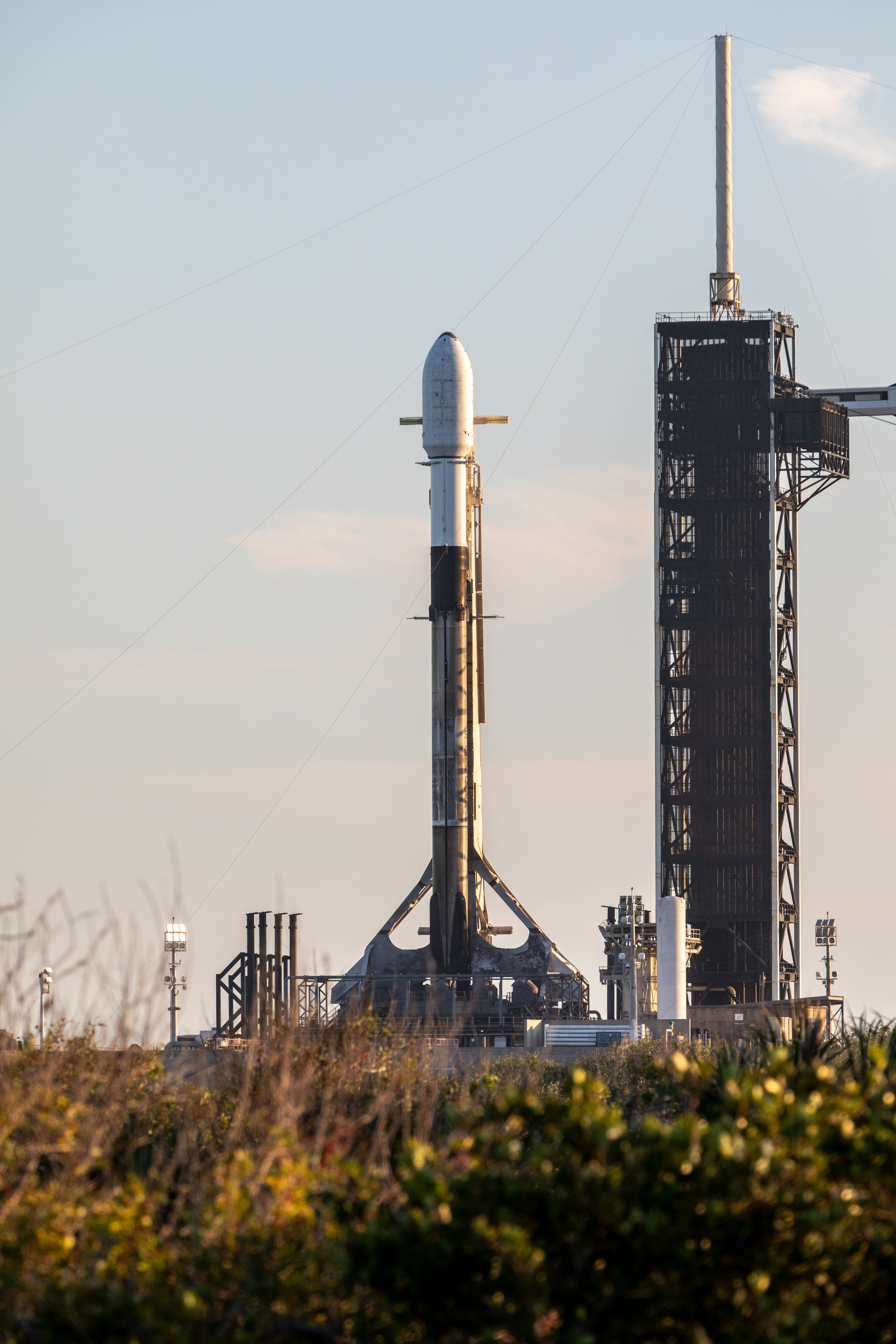
Falcon 9 on the pad at LC-39A before the launch of Blue Ghost Mission 1 (2025)

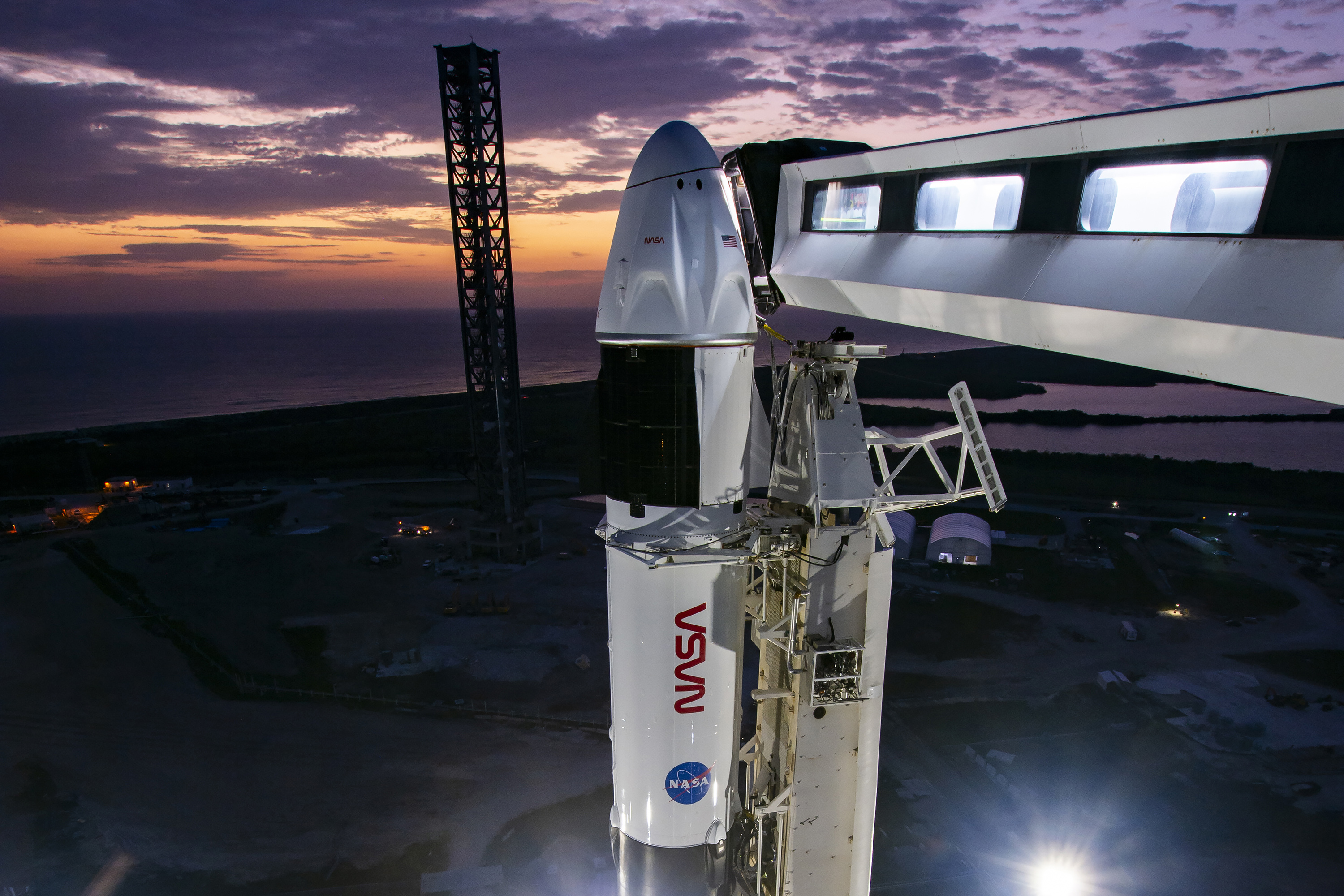
Crew Dragon Endurance viewed from the top of the LC-39A launch tower ahead of SpaceX Crew-10 (2025)

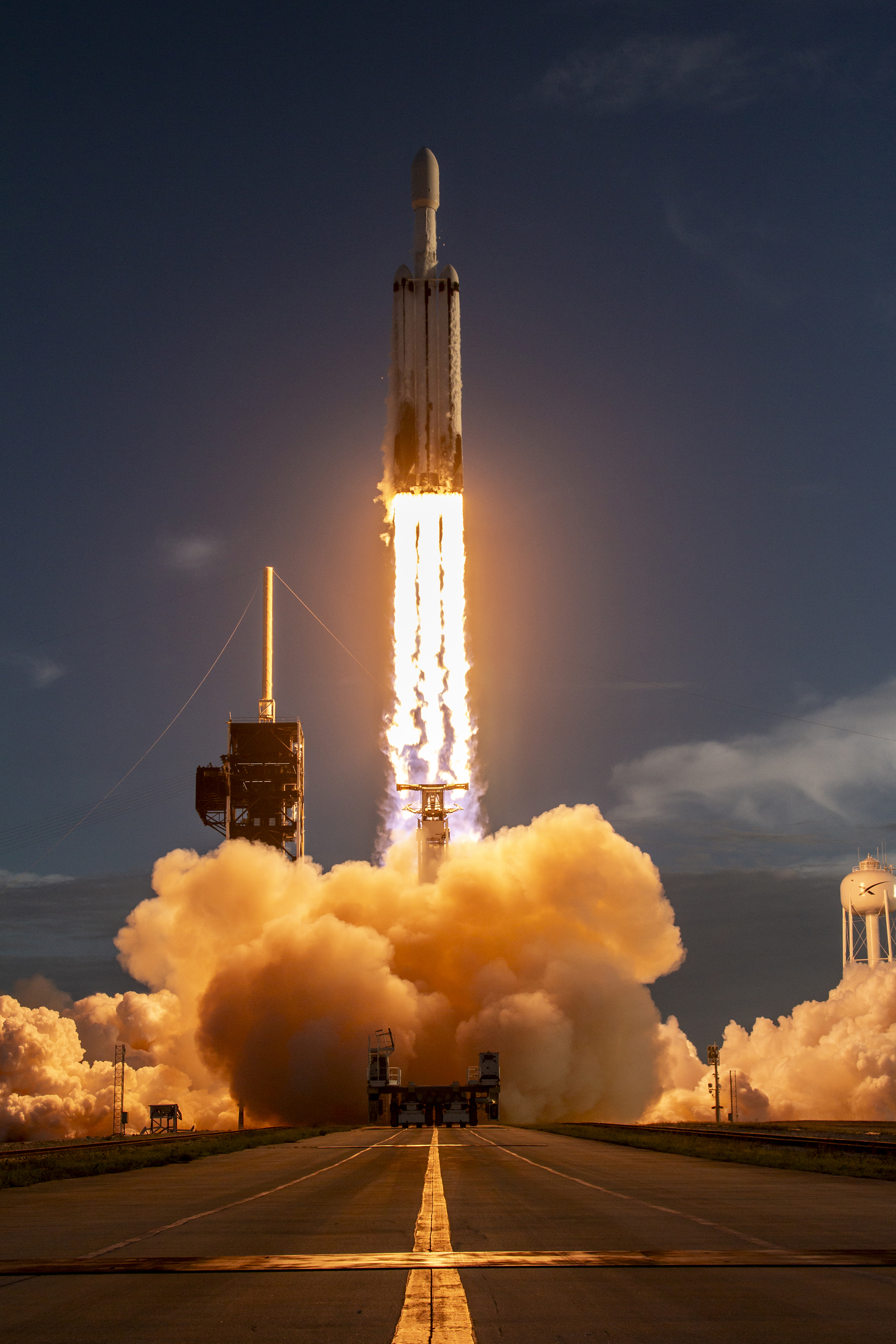
Launch of the Nancy Grace Roman Space Telescope aboard a Falcon Heavy rocket (2026)

== See also ==
- List of Cape Canaveral and Merritt Island launch sites
