= Rocket landing pad =

Rocket landing pad may refer to:

- Floating landing platform, a water-borne landing platform for a rocket
- SpaceX landing zone, a type of facility for landing SpaceX rockets
  - SpaceX Landing Complex 1, a SpaceX multi-pad landing facility on the Space Coast, Florida, United States
    - SpaceX Landing Zone 1, a SpaceX landing pad on the Space Coast, Florida, United States
    - SpaceX Landing Zone 2, a SpaceX landing pad on the Space Coast, Florida, United States
  - SpaceX Landing Zone 4, a SpaceX landing pad in Vandenberg AFB, California, United States

== See also ==
- Autonomous spaceport drone ship (ASDS)
- Landing pad (disambiguation)
- Landing zone (disambiguation)
