= Landing zone (disambiguation) =

A landing zone (LZ) is an area where aircraft can land.

Landing zone may also refer to:

- SpaceX landing zone (set index), SpaceX's land-based rocket landing facilities
- Hard disc drive landing zone, a safe area to land HDD flying heads during hard disk drive failure
- Landing zone, or staging, a storage area used for data processing during the extract, transform and load (ETL) process
- Landing zone (software), cloud computing infrastructure element

== See also ==
- Drop zone (disambiguation)
- Landing (disambiguation)
- Landing area
- Landing pad (disambiguation)
- Landing strip (disambiguation)
- LZ (disambiguation)
- Rocket landing pad (disambiguation)
