= Drop zone (disambiguation) =

A drop zone is a place where parachutists or parachuted supplies land.

Drop zone may also refer to:

- Drop Zone (film), a 1994 American action film
- Dropzone, a 1984 scrolling shooter video game
- Drop Zone (G.I. Joe), a fictional character in the G.I. Joe universe
- Drop zone (sports) or relegation zone, in sports with promotion and relegation, teams low enough in the table to be subject to relegation
- "Drop-Zone" (Young Justice), an episode of Young Justice
- Drop Zone: Stunt Tower, now known as Drop Tower: Scream Zone, a type of amusement ride at Cedar Fair amusement and theme parks in North America
- "Drop Zone", a song by Michael Woods
- "Drop Zone", a song by JJ Lawhorn
- Relegation, when a team is moved to a lower division in an open league system due to poor performance.

== See also ==
- Landing zone (disambiguation)
- Landing pad (disambiguation)
- Drop (disambiguation)
- Zone (disambiguation)
- DZ (disambiguation)
