= LZ =

LZ may refer to:

== Computing ==
- .lz, a filename extension for an lzip archive
- Abraham Lempel (born 1936) and Jacob Ziv (born 1931), Israeli computer scientists:
  - Lempel-Ziv, prefix for family of data compression algorithms, sometimes used as beginning for file name extensions
  - Lempel–Ziv–Markov chain algorithm

== Aviation ==
- Republic of Bulgaria (aviation code)
- Air Link IATA code
- Balkan Bulgarian Airlines IATA code (1947-2002)
- Swiss Global Air Lines IATA code (2005-2018)
- Landing zone, an area where aircraft can land
- LZ-, prefix of the serial numbers of Zeppelin airships built by Ferdinand von Zeppelin

== Other uses ==
- LUX-ZEPLIN, a dark matter detection experiment
- Lubrizol, a chemical manufacturer (NYSE symbol LZ)
- Lutz jump, a figure skating jump

== See also ==
- Landing zone (disambiguation)
- ZL (disambiguation)
- IZ (disambiguation)
- 1Z (disambiguation)
