= Autonomous spaceport drone ship =

Floating landing platform operated by SpaceX

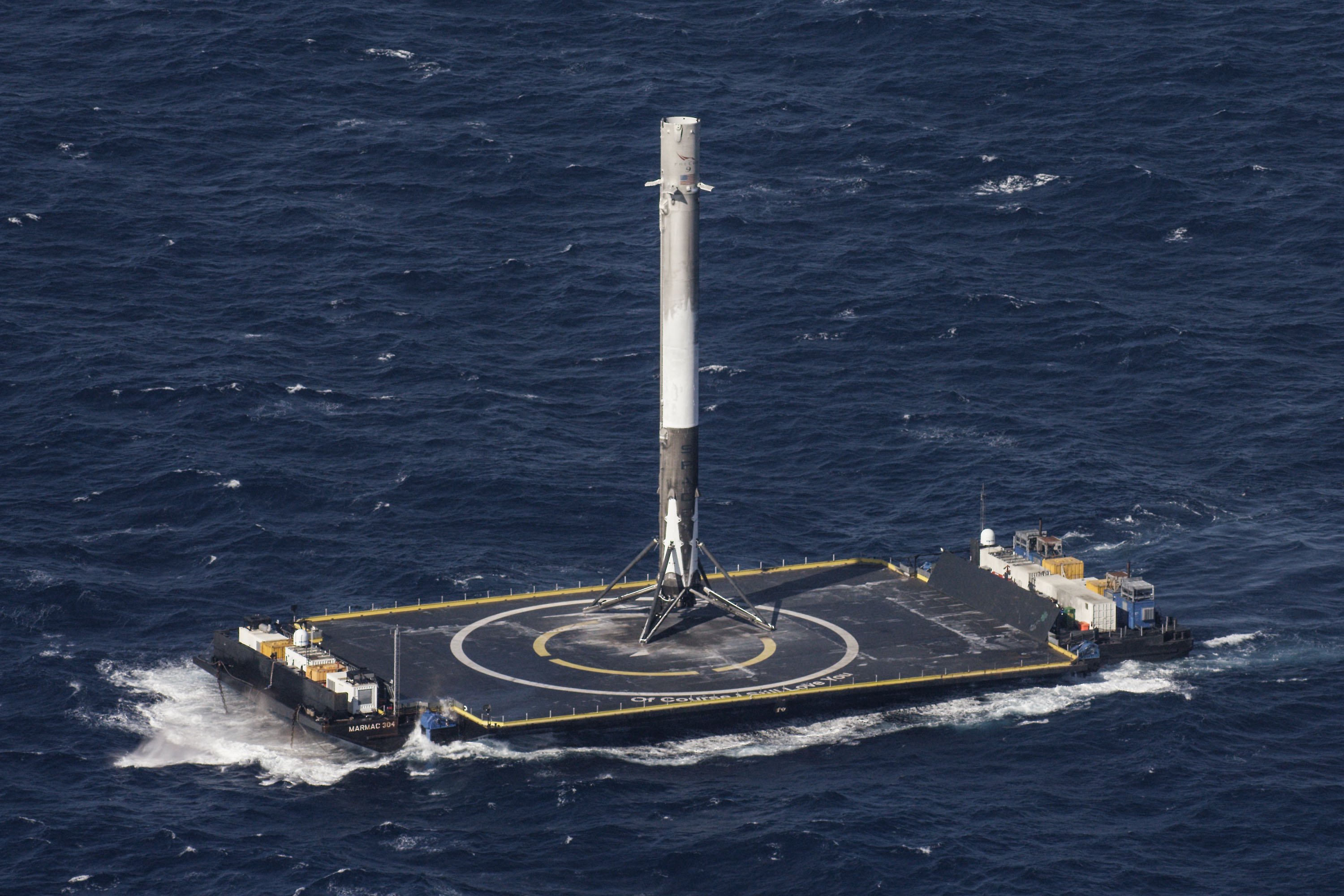
- Of Course I Still Love You carries the first rocket stage to successfully land on a drone ship (CRS-8, 8 April 2016)
- Launch site: Just Read the Instructions & A Shortfall of Gravitas: Cape Canaveral / Kennedy; Of Course I Still Love You: Vandenberg; You'll Thank Me Later: Starbase / Kennedy
- Location: Just Read the Instructions & A Shortfall of Gravitas: Port Canaveral; Of Course I Still Love You: Port of Long Beach; You'll Thank Me Later: Port of Brownsville
- Short name: ASDS
- Operator: SpaceX
Just Read the Instructions (I) landing history
- Status: Retired (May 2015)
- Landings: 2 (0 success, 2 failures)
- First landing: 10 January 2015 (CRS-5)
- Last landing: 14 April 2015 (CRS-6)
- Associated rockets: Falcon 9 v1.1
Of Course I Still Love You landing history
- Status: Active
- Landings: 243 (235 successes, 7 failures, 1 partial failure)
- First landing: 4 March 2016 (SES-9)
- Last landing: 21 November 2026 (USSF-317)
- Associated rockets: Falcon 9 Full Thrust; Falcon 9 Block 5; Falcon Heavy
Just Read the Instructions (II) landing history
- Status: Active (Starship); Retired (Falcon 9)
- Landings: 157 (154 successes, 1 failure, 2 partial failure)
- First landing: 17 January 2016 (Jason-3)
- Last landing: 21 April 2026 (GPS III-10)
- Associated rockets: Falcon 9 Full Thrust; Falcon 9 Block 5; Starship
A Shortfall of Gravitas landing history
- Status: Active
- Landings: 169 (168 successful, 1 failure)
- First landing: 29 August 2021 (CRS-23)
- Last landing: 20 September 2026 (Bandwagon-5)
- Associated rockets: Falcon 9 Block 5; Falcon Heavy
You'll Thank Me Later landing history
- Status: Active
- Associated rockets: Starship

An autonomous spaceport drone ship (ASDS) is a modified ocean-going barge developed by SpaceX and equipped with propulsion systems to maintain precise position and a large landing platform. They were developed to recover the first stage (also called the booster) of its launch vehicles. By recovering and reusing these boosters, SpaceX has significantly reduced the cost of space launch.

SpaceX operates two ASDS: A Shortfall of Gravitas (ASOG), and Of Course I Still Love You (OCISLY). ASOG operates from Port Canaveral supporting launches from Kennedy Space Center and Cape Canaveral Space Force Station landing in the Atlantic Ocean, while OCISLY operates from the Port of Long Beach supporting launches from Vandenberg Space Force Base landing in the Pacific Ocean.

Depending on mission requirements, SpaceX can return the booster to the launch site for a ground landing, land the booster at sea on an ASDS, or discard it. While a ground landing is the least expensive option, it requires the most fuel and thus reduces payload capacity. Sea landings offer a balance of cost and performance, making them the most common choice, used on approximately three-quarters of missions.

== History ==
In 2009, SpaceX CEO Elon Musk articulated ambitions for "creating a paradigm shift in the traditional approach for reusing rocket hardware". In October 2014, SpaceX announced that they had contracted with a Louisiana shipyard to build a floating landing platform for reusable orbital launch vehicles. Early information indicated that the platform would carry an approximately 90 m × 50 m (300 ft × 160 ft) landing pad and would be capable of precision positioning so that the platform could hold its position for launch vehicle landing. On 22 November 2014, Musk released a photograph of the "autonomous spaceport drone ship" along with additional details of its construction and size.

As of December 2014, the first drone ship used, the McDonough Marine Service's Marmac 300 barge, was based in Jacksonville, Florida, at the northern tip of the JAXPORT Cruise Terminal, where SpaceX built a stand to secure the Falcon stage during post-landing operations. The stand consisted of four 6,800 kg (15,000 lb), 270 cm (110 in) tall and 244.5 cm (96.3 in) wide pedestal structures bolted to a concrete base. A mobile crane would have lifted the stage from the ship and placed it on the stand. Tasks such as removing or folding back the landing legs prior to placing the stage in a horizontal position for trucking would have been undertaken while the booster was on the stand.

The ASDS landing location for the first landing test was in the Atlantic approximately 320 km (200 mi) northeast of the launch location at Cape Canaveral, and 266 km (165 mi) southeast of Charleston, South Carolina.

On 23 January 2015, during repairs to the ship following the unsuccessful first test, Musk announced that the ship was to be named Just Read the Instructions, with a sister ship planned for West Coast launches to be named Of Course I Still Love You (OCISLY). On 29 January 2015, SpaceX released a manipulated photo of the ship with the name illustrating how it would look once painted.

The first Just Read the Instructions was retired in May 2015 after approximately six months of service in the Atlantic Ocean, and its duties were assumed by Of Course I Still Love You. The former ASDS was modified by removing the wing extensions that had extended the barge surface and the equipment (thrusters, cameras, and communications gear) that had been added to refit it as an ASDS; these items were saved for future reuse.

In 2018, Elon Musk announced plans for an additional barge, A Shortfall of Gravitas (ASOG), to support East Coast operations but the build of the droneship was delayed, and instead JRTI was moved to the East Coast and began operations in June 2020. ASOG was completed in July 2021.

By June 2020, SpaceX had received the ability to use "its own private Automatic Identification System (AIS) aids to navigation (ATON) to mark the temporary exclusion areas it uses during rocket launches [from] Cape Canaveral, Florida", the first such use of dynamic restricted area ever approved by the U.S. Coast Guard.

== Fleet ==
Vessel	Home port	Status
Just Read The Instructions (I)	—N/a	Scrapped
Of Course I Still Love You	Long Beach	Active
Just Read The Instructions (II)	Port Canaveral	Repurposed for Starship
A Shortfall of Gravitas	Port Canaveral	Active

=== Just Read the Instructions (I) ===
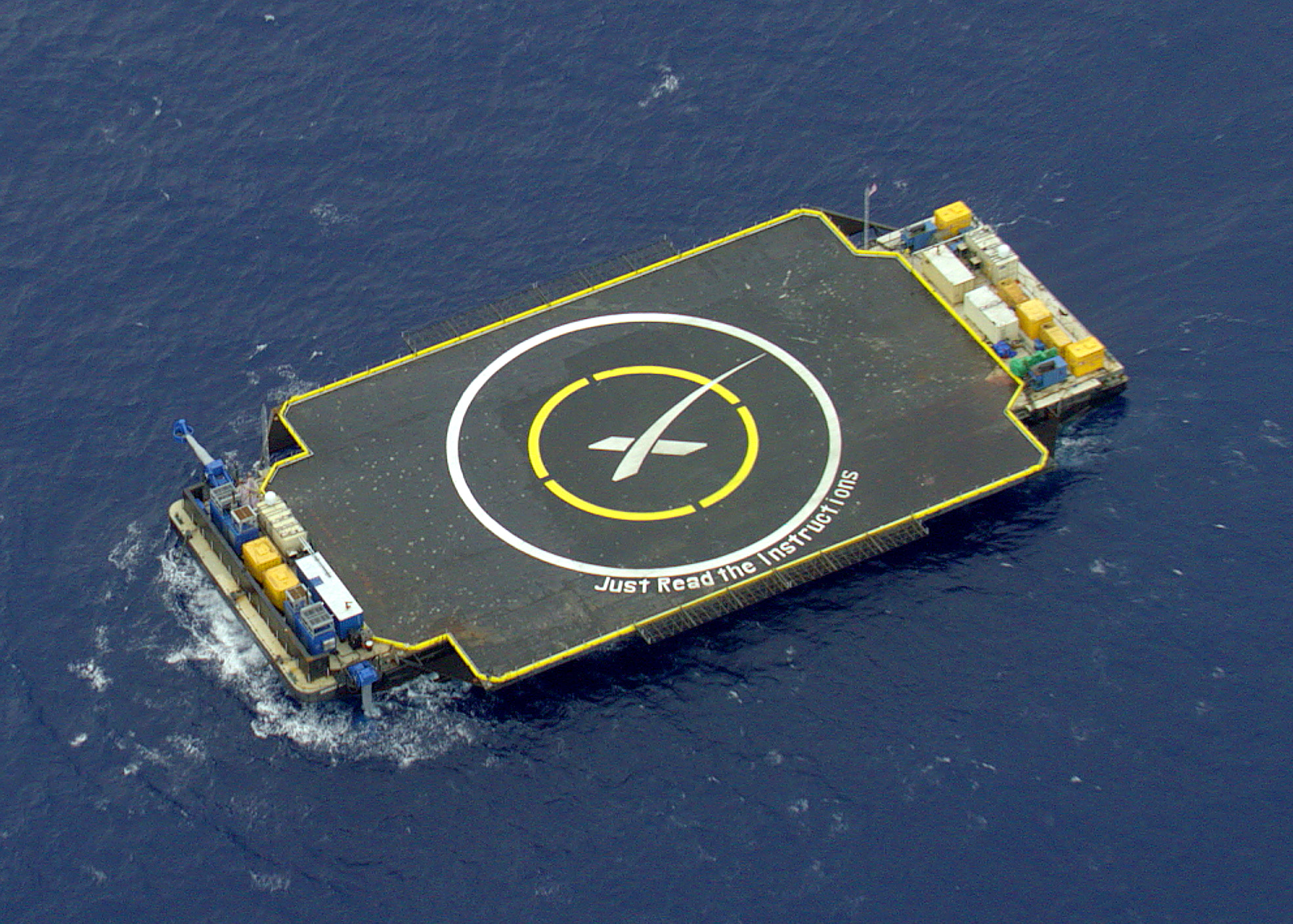
Just Read the Instructions (I)

SpaceX's first ASDS was named Just Read the Instructions (JRTI). Converted from the existing Marmac 300 barge, JRTI served as a testbed for just two landing attempts, SpaceX CRS-5 and SpaceX CRS-6, the latter of which ended with the booster toppling over and exploding, damaging JRTI beyond repair on 14 April 2015.

=== Of Course I Still Love You ===
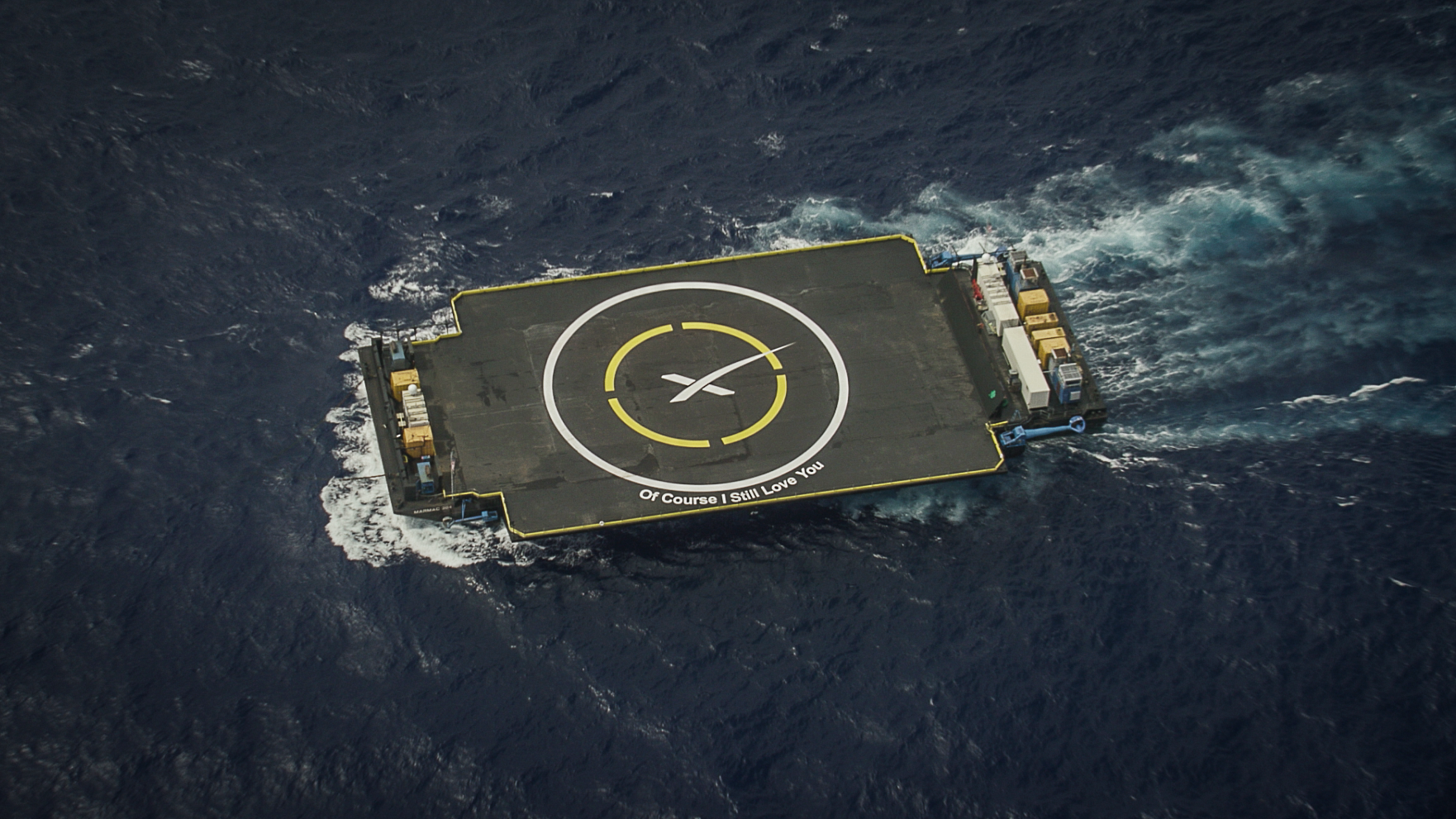
Of Course I Still Love You

SpaceX's second ASDS, Of Course I Still Love You (OCISLY) was constructed in a Louisiana shipyard beginning in early 2015 on the Marmac 304 hull. While the dimensions of the ship are nearly identical to the original JRTI, OCISLY incorporated improvements including a steel blast wall. Initially intended for West Coast operations, OCISLY's role shifted after the loss of the original JRTI in April 2015. The ship entered service in late June 2015, based in Jacksonville, Florida, before relocating to Port Canaveral later that year.

OCISLY achieved a historic first on April 8, 2016, successfully landing the first stage of the Dragon SpaceX CRS-8 mission. Despite sustaining damage during the Falcon Heavy Test Flight in February 2018, the ship was repaired and continued operations. Another notable moment came on May 30, 2020, when OCISLY captured the first stage of the Crew Dragon Demo-2 mission, marking the return of human spaceflight from U.S. soil.

In 2021, OCISLY was relocated to the Port of Long Beach to support West Coast launches from Vandenberg.

=== Just Read the Instructions (II) ===
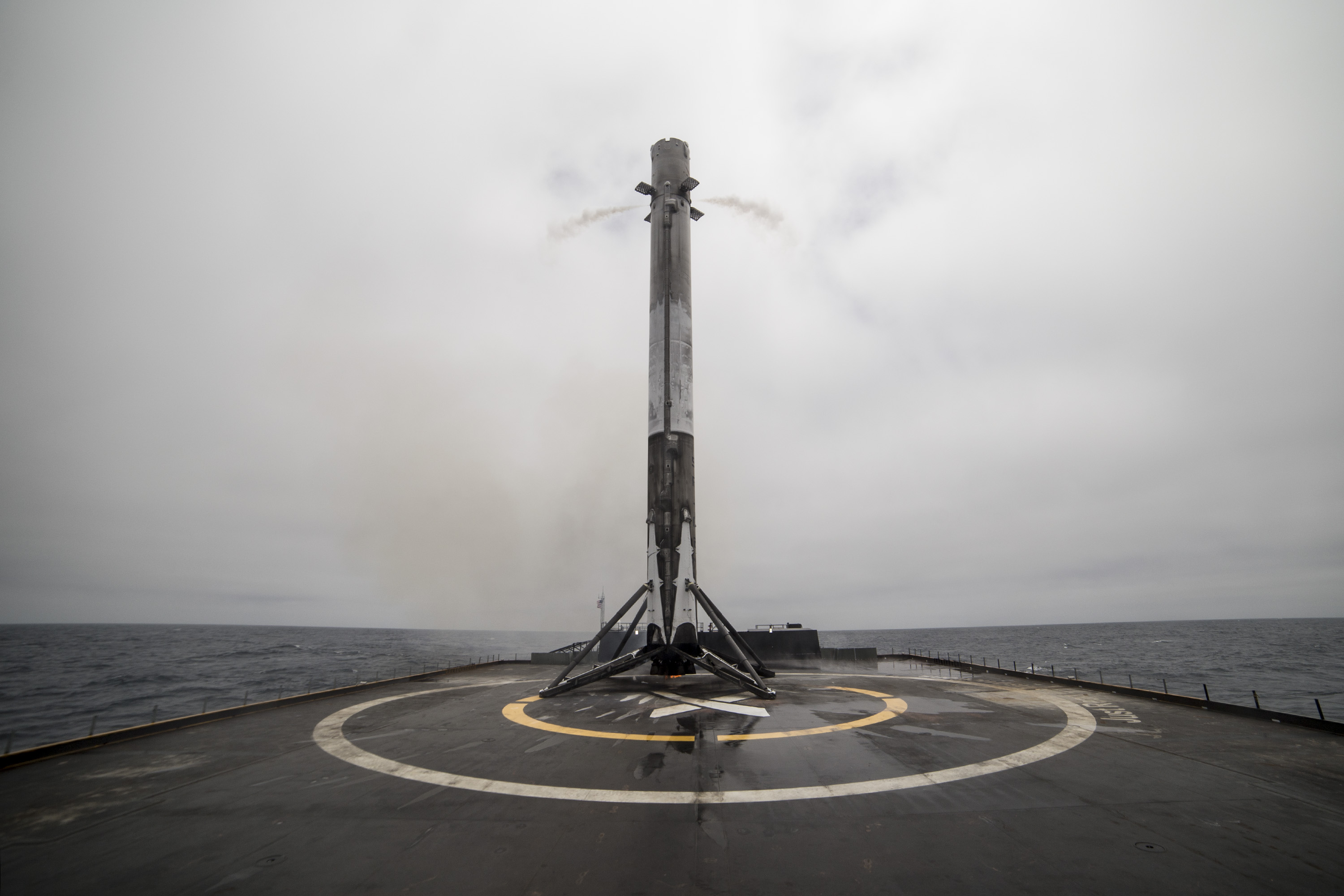
Falcon 9 on Just Read The Instructions (II)

The third ASDS barge was named Just Read The Instructions, using the Marmac 303 barge hull. It was converted during 2015 in a Louisiana shipyard. When the refit as an ASDS was complete, the barge transited the Panama Canal in June 2015, carrying its wing extensions (the same ones originally built for the first Just Read The Instructions on the Marmac 300) as cargo on the deck because the ASDS, when complete, would be too wide to pass through the canal. The ship underwent a major refit in September 2019 to May 2020, initially in Louisiana, and finishing at Port Canaveral, including four new, much larger, positioning thrusters.

The home port for the Marmac 303 was initially the Port of Los Angeles (until in August 2019) at the Altana Sea marine research and business campus in San Pedro, California's outer harbor. The landing platform and tender vessels began docking there in July 2015 in advance of the main construction of the AltaSea facilities.

SpaceX announced that the Marmac 303 would be the second ASDS to be named Just Read the Instructions in January 2016, shortly before its first use as a landing platform for Falcon 9 Flight 21.

On 17 January 2016, JRTI was put to first use in an attempt to recover a Falcon 9 first-stage booster from the Jason-3 mission from Vandenberg Space Launch Complex 4. The booster successfully landed on the deck; however, a lockout collet failed to engage on one of the legs, causing the first stage to tip over, exploding on impact with the deck. On 14 January 2017, SpaceX launched Falcon 9 flight 29 from Vandenberg Air Force Base and landed the first stage on the JRTI, which was located about 370 km (230 mi) downrange in the Pacific Ocean, making it the first successful landing in the Pacific.

In August 2019, JRTI left the Port of Los Angeles to be towed to the Gulf of Mexico; it transited through the Panama Canal. JRTI arrived in Morgan City, Louisiana in late August 2019 and stayed there until December 2019 then moved to Port Canaveral.

JRTI is based at Port Canaveral and began operations in the Atlantic in June 2020, supporting the first time a Falcon 9 would land after a 5th use.

On February 18, 2025, a Falcon 9 landed on JRTI off the coast of The Bahamas, marking the first international landing of a booster.

On April 21, 2026, it was announced that JRTI will no longer be supporting Falcon operations and will instead be used for Starship. It will be used alongside the vessel You'll Thank Me Later for transportation operations.

=== A Shortfall of Gravitas ===
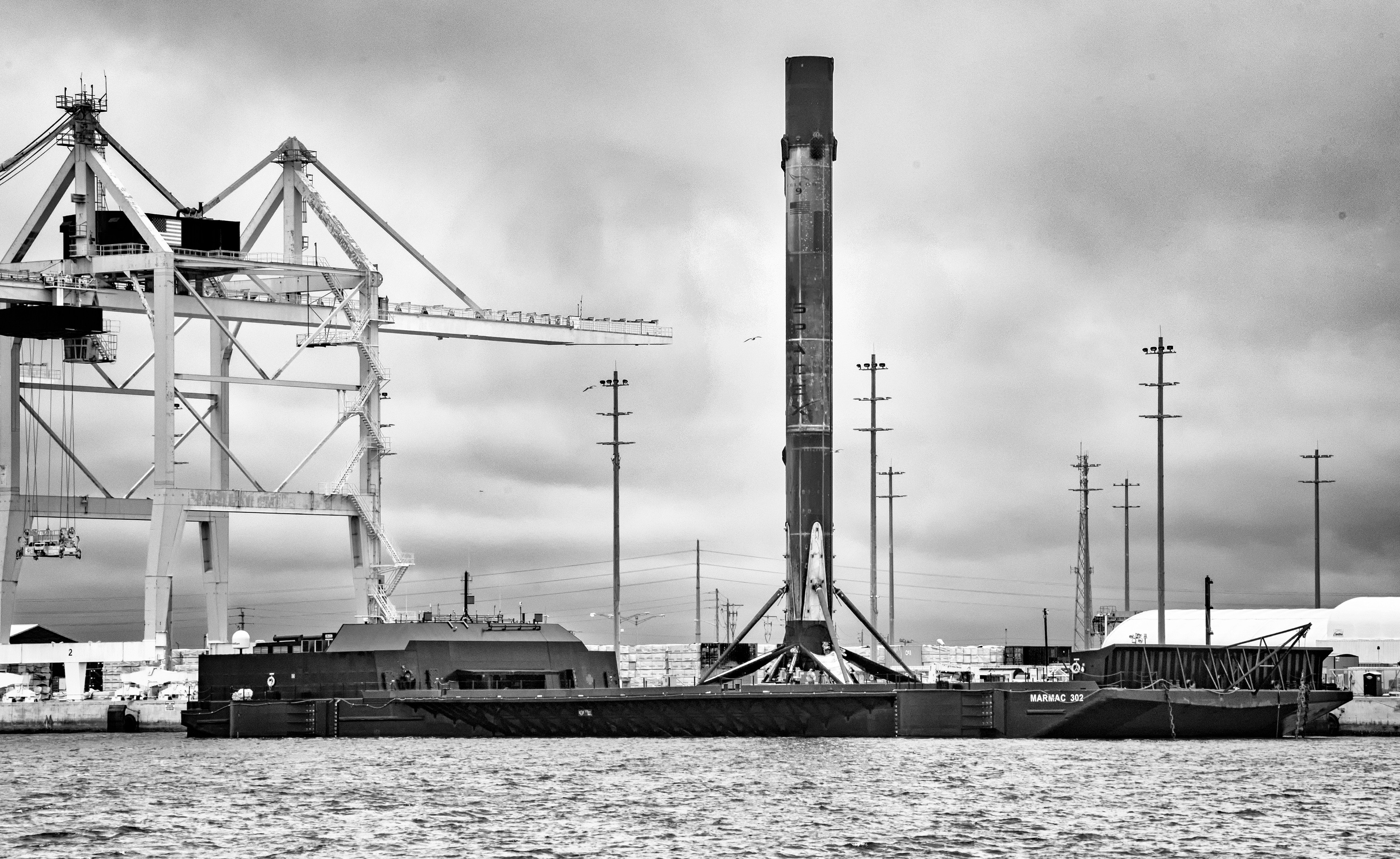
Falcon 9 on A Shortfall of Gravitas

A fourth ASDS, A Shortfall of Gravitas (ASOG), was announced in February 2018 and was originally planned to enter service in mid-2019. It was made by modifying Marmac 302. In October 2020, Elon Musk re-affirmed plans to build a ship of this name. In January 2021, Marmac 302 was spotted at Bollinger Fourchon site. On 6 April 2021, NASASpaceFlight.com spotted the Octagrabber presumed to be for A Shortfall of Gravitas at the Cidco Road facility in Cocoa Beach, Florida. It may have originated as an upgraded Octagrabber for Just Read The Instructions. By mid April 2021, Marmac 302 had scaffolding to prepare for construction, which was confirmed on 9 May 2021. It joined the East Coast fleet in July, after sending OCISLY to the West Coast in July 2021.

On 9 July 2021, Elon Musk tweeted aerial footage of the completed drone ship in the Gulf of Mexico while undergoing its first sea-trials. According to him, this drone ship will not require a tug boat to be towed to the landing area. ASOG is used to support rocket launches from a base at Port Canaveral. After completing a sea trial in Port Fourchon, transiting over the Gulf of Mexico while being towed by Finn Falgout from its construction port, Port Fourchon to its recovery base, Port Canaveral, arriving at 16:47 UTC on 15 July 2021, and completing a number of sea trials, it successfully completed its first booster landing attempt for a Falcon 9 first-stage booster B1061.4 being used in CRS-23 mission at 300 km downrange in the Atlantic Ocean, becoming the first ASDS to land a first stage booster in its maiden landing attempt.

ASOG is based at Port Canaveral to support east coast recovery operations.

== Characteristics ==
Autonomous spaceport drone ship
History
- Name: Just Read the Instructions
- Owner: McDonough Marine Service
- Operator: SpaceX
- In service: November 2014
- Out of service: May 2015
- Status: Retired

General characteristics as drone ship (2014–present)
- Length: 300 ft (91 m)
- Beam: 170 ft (52 m)
- Depth: 19.8 ft (6.0 m)
- Installed power: Generator units
- Propulsion: 4 × 300 hp (220 kW) azimuth thrusters with 40 in (1.0 m) nozzles, as of January 2015
- Notes: Autonomous or remote-controlled operation modes are available during rocket landing operations

The ASDS are autonomous vessels capable of precision positioning, originally stated to be within 3 m (9.8 ft) even under storm conditions, using GPS position information and four diesel-powered azimuth thrusters. In addition to the autonomous operating mode, the ships may also be telerobotically controlled.

The azimuth thrusters are hydraulic propulsion outdrive units with modular diesel-hydraulic-drive power units manufactured by Thrustmaster, a marine equipment manufacturer in Texas. The returning first stage must not only land within the confines of the deck surface, but must also deal with ocean swells and GPS errors.

SpaceX equips the ships with a variety of sensor and measurement technology to gather data on the booster returns and landing attempts, including commercial off the shelf GoPro cameras.

At the center of the ASDS landing pads is a circle that encloses the SpaceX stylized "X" in an X-marks-the-spot landing point.

=== Names ===
The ASDS have names that are the same as or similar to spaceships that appear in the Culture series of science fiction novels by Iain M. Banks.

=== Just Read the Instructions (Marmac 300) ===
The landing platform of the upper deck of the first barge named Just Read the Instructions was 170 ft × 300 ft (52 m × 91 m), while the span of the Falcon 9 v1.1 landing legs was 60 ft (18 m).

=== Of Course I Still Love You (Marmac 304) ===
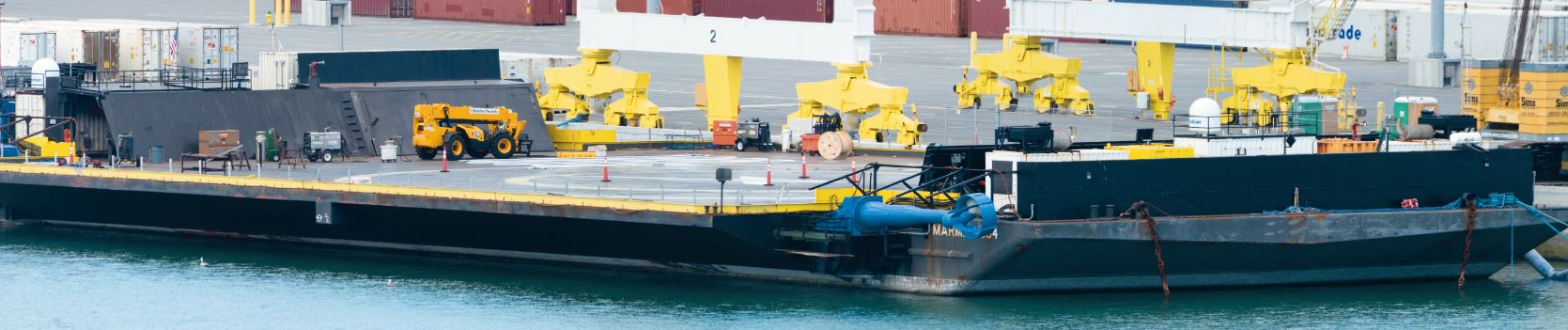
Side view of OCISLY docked in March 2017

Of Course I Still Love You is registered as 1247500 was built as a refit of the barge Marmac 304 for landings in the Atlantic Ocean. Its homeport was Port Canaveral, Florida, from December 2015 to June 2021, after being ported for a year at the Port of Jacksonville during most of 2015. Of Course I Still Love You worked successfully as a landing platform after the Falcon 9 rocket brought astronauts to space on the crewed mission Demo-2 on 30 May 2020. In June 2021, OCISLY was transported to the Port of Long Beach to begin supporting launches on the west coast. On 8 July 2021, OCISLY was docked in Long Beach after transiting the Panama Canal. It is the first ASDS where 50th and 100th successful landings of a particular ASDS were first achieved.

=== Just Read the Instructions (Marmac 303) ===
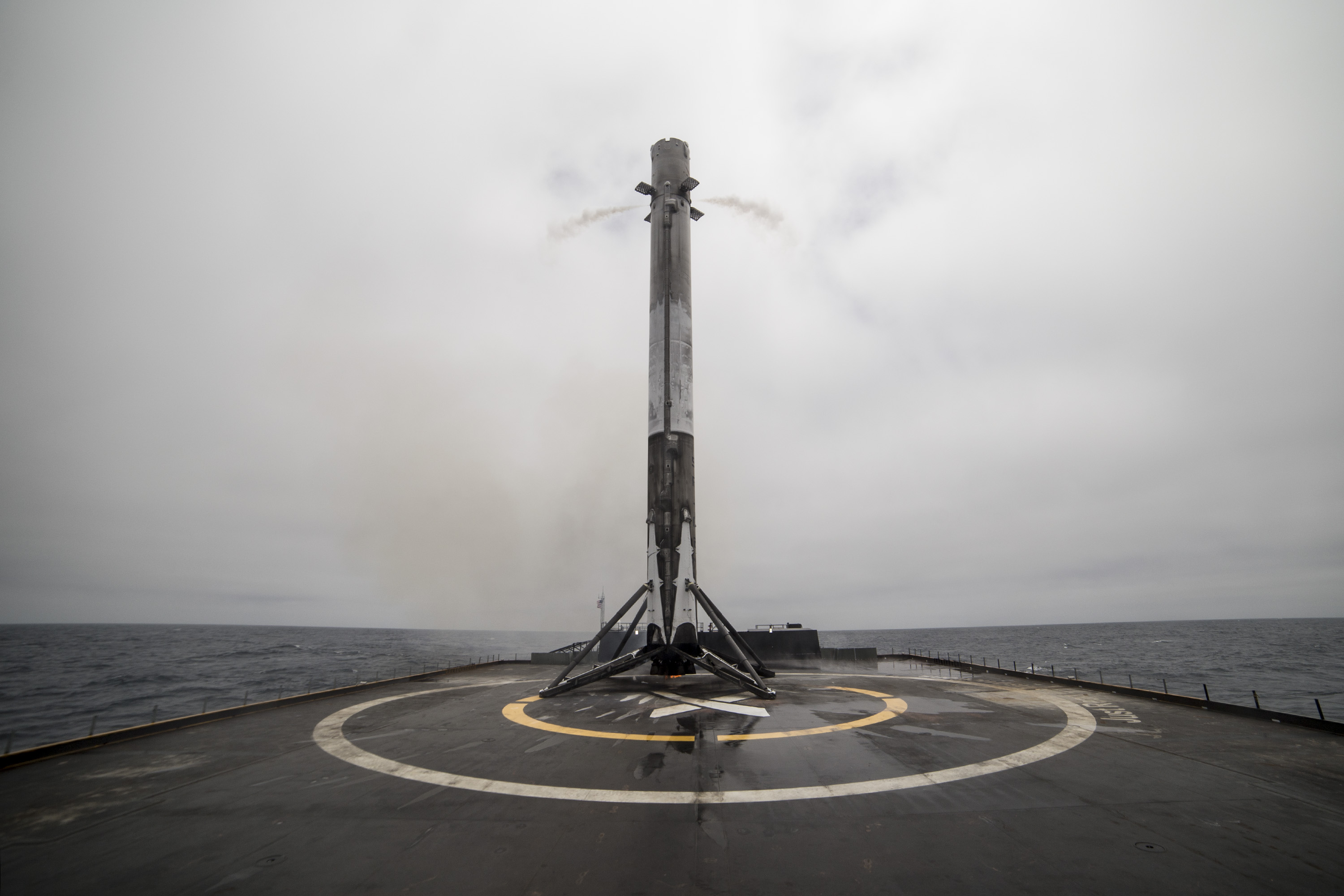
Falcon 9 landed on JRTI post Iridium-2 mission

Just Read the Instructions, the second barge with that name, is registered as 1245062 with MMSI 368219920, and was built as a refit of the barge Marmac 303 in 2015 for landings in the Pacific Ocean. Its homeport was in the Port of Los Angeles, California from 2015 to 2019 but in August 2019 it was moved to the Gulf of Mexico. After undergoing upgrades and refurbishment, in December 2019 it was moved to Cape Canaveral. After several months of additional work, including installation of new thrusters, Just Read the Instructions went back into service in June 2020 with booster recovery from Starlink v1.0 L7 mission.

=== A Shortfall of Gravitas (Marmac 302) ===
The fourth ASDS, named A Shortfall of Gravitas, is registered as 1240683 with MMSI 368219910 and was mentioned by SpaceX in February 2018 and again in October 2020 to help support East Coast launches. In May 2021, conversion of Marmac 302 into ASOG began and was expected to move to the East Coast for operation in the following months. A Shortfall of Gravitas underwent its first sea trials on 9 July 2021, and a short video of the ship underway was shared on Twitter by Elon Musk. After completing the sea trials, it was towed by Finn Falgout from its construction port, Port Fourchon, to its recovery base, Port Canaveral, arriving 15 July 2021.

== Operation ==
A tug is used to bring the ASDS to its oceanic position, and a support ship stands by some distance away from the unmanned ASDS. Following landing, technicians and engineers typically board the landing platform and secure the rocket's landing legs to lock the vehicle in place for transport back to port. The first stage is secured to the deck of the drone ship with steel hold-downs welded on to the feet of the landing legs. In June 2017, OCISLY started being deployed with a robot that drives under the rocket and grabs onto the hold-down clamps located on the outside of the Falcon 9's structure after landing. The robot is officially called the "octagrabber".

== Vessel missions ==
The first flight test was 10 January 2015, when SpaceX conducted a controlled-descent flight test to land the first stage of Falcon 9 Flight 14 after it helped to loft a contracted payload into Earth orbit. Before the first landing attempt, SpaceX estimated that the likelihood of a successful landing on the platform would be 50% or less. The landings went from being landing tests to become routine parts of missions.

=== Autonomous spaceport drone ship (ASDS) Statistics ===
==== Usage ====
- Just Read The Instructions (I) (Marmac 300)
- Of Course I Still Love You (Marmac 304)
- Just Read The Instructions (Marmac 303)
- A Shortfall of Gravitas (Marmac 302)

==== Booster landings ====
- Ground-pad failure
- Drone-ship failure
- Ocean test failure (Note: Controlled descent; ocean touchdown control failed; no recovery)
- Parachute test failure (Note: Passive reentry failed before parachute deployment)
- Ground-pad success
- Drone-ship success
- Ocean test success (Note: Controlled descent; soft vertical ocean touchdown; no recovery)
- No attempt

=== Mission details ===
No.	Date	ASDS	Mission	ASDS landing mission description	Landing result	Image
1	10 January 2015	JRTI (I)	SpaceX CRS-5	SpaceX attempted a landing during SpaceX CRS-5 on Just Read the Instructions on 10 January 2015. Many of the test objectives were achieved, including precision control of the rocket's descent to land on the platform at a specific point in the North Atlantic Ocean and a large amount of test data was obtained from the first use of grid fin control surfaces used for more precise reentry positioning. However, the landing was a hard landing. The SpaceX webcast indicated that the boostback burn and reentry burns for the descending first-stage occurred, and that the descending rocket then went "below the horizon", as expected, which eliminated the live telemetry signal. Shortly thereafter, SpaceX released information that the launch vehicle did get to the drone spaceport ship as planned, but "landed hard ... Ship itself is fine. Some of the support equipment on the deck will need to be replaced".	Failure	
—	11 February 2015	JRTI (I)	DSCOVR	Just Read the Instructions was towed to sea for the Deep Space Climate Observatory satellite launch on 11 February 2015 but, it was not used for a landing attempt. Ocean conditions of 7 m (23 ft)-high waves interfered with the ASDS recovery duties for the landing, so the ship returned to port and no landing test occurred. SpaceX executed a soft landing in the sea to continue data gathering for future landing attempts. The soft landing was successful, Elon Musk tweeted that it landed with a lateral accuracy of 10 m (33 ft) away from the target and in a vertical position.	No attempt	
2	14 April 2015	JRTI (I)	SpaceX CRS-6	On 14 April 2015, SpaceX made a second attempt during SpaceX CRS-6 to land a Falcon first-stage on the Marmac 300 drone ship Just Read the Instructions. News from Elon Musk suggested that it made a hard landing. He later clarified that it appeared to have made a vertical landing on the ship, but then toppled over due to excessive remaining lateral momentum.	Failure	CRS-6 first stage booster landing attempt on ASDS
—	28 June 2015	OCISLY	SpaceX CRS-7	In order to prepare for SpaceX CRS-7 on 28 June 2015, the then new ASDS, Of Course I Still Love You, was towed out to sea to prepare for a third landing test. This was its first operational assignment. However, the Falcon launch vehicle disintegrated before first stage shutdown so the mission never progressed to the point where the controlled-descent test could happen.	Precluded	
3	17 January 2016	JRTI	Jason-3	In January 2016, SpaceX indicated that there would be an attempt to land on the then new ASDS, reusing the name Just Read the Instructions (JRTI), located on the West Coast following the launch of Falcon 9 flight 21 scheduled for 17 January 2016. JRTI was located about 320 km (200 mi) downrange from the launch site in the Pacific Ocean. Musk reported that the first stage did successfully soft-land on the ship, but a lockout latch on one of the landing legs failed to latch and the first stage fell over, causing a breach of the propellant tanks and a deflagration on impact with the drone ship.	Failure	First stage of Falcon 9 flight 21 descending to the ASDS
4	4 March 2016	OCISLY	SES-9	During a launch of a heavy communications satellite on Falcon 9 flight 22 on 4 March 2016, SpaceX performed an experimental descent and landing attempt with very low propellant margins. For the first time, and in order to reduce the propellant required, SpaceX attempted the landing burn with three engines. SpaceX had indicated that the test was unlikely to result in a successful landing and recovery. In the event, one engine flamed out early, and the first stage hit Of Course I Still Love You (OCISLY)'s deck surface with considerable velocity, destroying the first stage and causing damage to the drone ship's deck. By 21 March 2016, the deck of the drone ship was nearly repaired.	Failure	
5	8 April 2016	OCISLY	SpaceX CRS-8	The Falcon 9 first-stage performed a successful landing on OCISLY in the Atlantic Ocean off the coast of Florida at T+9 minutes and 10 seconds after liftoff of SpaceX CRS-8, the first-ever successful landing of a first stage on an Autonomous Spaceport Drone Ship. The first stage was successfully affixed to the barge for the maritime transport portion of the journey back to port, and successfully completed its journey, entering Port Canaveral early in the morning on 12 April 2016.	Success	The first time that the first stage of a Falcon 9 landed on a drone ship.
6	6 May 2016	OCISLY	JCSat-14	SpaceX landed the first stage of the Falcon 9 on OCISLY during the JCSat-14 mission on 6 May 2016, its second time successfully landing on a drone ship at sea, and its first time recovering a booster from a high-velocity (GTO) mission.	Success	
7	27 May 2016	OCISLY	Thaicom 8	SpaceX landed the first stage of a Falcon 9 on OCISLY during the Thaicom 8 mission, its third time successfully landing on a drone ship at sea.	Success	
8	15 June 2016	OCISLY	ABS-3A / Eutelsat 115 West B	SpaceX failed to land the first stage of the Falcon 9 on OCISLY during the Asia Broadcast Satellite / Eutelsat mission. Elon Musk tweeted that one of the three engines had low thrust, and when the rocket was just off the deck, the engines ran out of oxidizer.	Failure	
9	14 August 2016	OCISLY	JCSAT-16	Falcon 9's 28th flight propelled the Japanese JCSAT-16 communications satellite to a geostationary transfer orbit on 14 August 2016. The first stage re-entered the atmosphere and during the night landed vertically on OCISLY, positioned in the Atlantic Ocean nearly 400 miles from the Florida coastline; unlike previous successful landings, this landing-burn only used one engine, not three.	Success	
10	14 January 2017	JRTI	Iridium NEXT-1	The Falcon 9 first stage landed on the Pacific Ocean ASDS JRTI during the Iridium NEXT-1 mission. This marked the first successful landing on JRTI and the first landing in the Pacific Ocean.	Success	
11	30 March 2017	OCISLY	SES-10	The Falcon 9 first stage landed on OCISLY during the SES-10 launch. This was the first successful launch and landing of a previously flown orbital booster.	Success	
12	23 June 2017	OCISLY	BulgariaSat-1	The Falcon 9 first stage landed on OCISLY during the BulgariaSat-1 launch. This was the second successful launch and landing of a previously flown orbital booster. This was also the first booster to have landed on both active drone ships. While the landing was considered a success, the booster was "slammed sideways" and suffered a 'hard landing' which resulted in 'most of the emergency crush core being used'.	Success	
13	25 June 2017	JRTI	Iridium NEXT-2	The Falcon 9 first stage landed on JRTI during the Iridium launch.	Success	
14	24 August 2017	JRTI	FORMOSAT-5	The Falcon 9 first stage landed on JRTI during the FORMOSAT-5 launch.	Success	
15	9 October 2017	JRTI	Iridium NEXT-3	The Falcon 9 first stage landed on JRTI during the Iridium launch.	Success	
16	11 October 2017	OCISLY	SES-11	The Falcon 9 first stage landed on OCISLY during the SES-11 launch.	Success	
17	30 October 2017	OCISLY	Koreasat 5A	The Falcon 9 first stage landed on OCISLY during the Koreasat 5A mission.	Success	
18	6 February 2018	OCISLY	Falcon Heavy Test Flight	On 6 February 2018, the central core from the Falcon Heavy Test Flight attempted a landing on OCISLY. There was not enough TEA-TEB igniter remaining and only the centermost of the three engines required ignited during the landing burn. The core hit the water near the drone ship at over 300 mph and was destroyed. The explosion of the central core upon impact also damaged two of the thrusters on the drone ship. The side boosters successfully landed at Landing Zones 1 and 2. The loss of the central core did not impact SpaceX operations since it was from an older generation of the Falcon 9 not intended to be reused.	Failure	
—	6 March 2018	OCISLY	Hispasat 30W-6	On 6 March 2018, a Falcon 9 Full Thrust carrying the Hispasat 30W-6 communications satellite for Hispasat of Spain was originally supposed to attempt a landing, as the first stage was programmed to do the landing. However, due to sea conditions considered to be unfavorable, the drone ship was left at the port. The first stage did its pre-programmed maneuvers, but did not attempt to land.	No attempt	
19	18 April 2018	OCISLY	TESS	The Falcon 9 first stage landed on OCISLY during the TESS mission and was the 13th successful drone ship-based recovery.	Success	
20	11 May 2018	OCISLY	Bangabandhu-1	The Falcon 9 Block 5 first stage landed on OCISLY during the Bangabandhu-1 mission and was the first flight of a Block 5 booster and upper stage. It was the overall 25th successful recovery of a booster.	Success	
21	22 July 2018	OCISLY	Telstar 19V	The Falcon 9 first stage landed on OCISLY during the Telstar 19V mission.	Success	
22	25 July 2018	JRTI	Iridium 7	The Falcon 9 first stage landed on JRTI during the Iridium 7 mission.	Success	
23	7 August 2018	OCISLY	Merah Putih	Falcon 9 first stage landed on OCISLY during the Merah Putih mission.	Success	
24	10 September 2018	OCISLY	Telstar 18V	The Falcon 9 first stage B1049 landed on OCISLY during the Telstar 18V mission.	Success	
25	15 November 2018	OCISLY	Es'hail-2	Falcon 9 first stage landed on OCISLY during the Es'hail-2 mission.	Success	
26	3 December 2018	JRTI	SSO-A	Falcon 9 block 5 first stage landed on JRTI during the Spaceflight SSO-A mission and was the first time that a booster landed 3 times.	Success	
27	11 January 2019	JRTI	Iridium 8	Falcon 9 block 5 first stage B1049 landed on JRTI during the Iridium 8 mission.	Success	
28	22 February 2019	OCISLY	Nusantara Satu/Beresheet/ S5	Falcon 9 block 5 first stage B1048 landed on OCISLY during the Nusantara Satu, Beresheet & S5 mission.	Success	
29	2 March 2019	OCISLY	SpX-DM1	Falcon 9 block 5 first stage B1051.1 landed on OCISLY during the SpX-DM1 (SpaceX Demonstration Mission 1).	Success	
30	11 April 2019	OCISLY	Arabsat-6A	Falcon Heavy block 5 first stage's center booster B1055.1 landed on OCISLY. This was the first successful landing of a center booster used in a Falcon Heavy rocket. The side boosters also landed on their respective ground pads. However, the recovery team was unable to secure the center booster onto the drone ship due to rough seas and the core was lost at sea. SpaceX thus successfully executed furthest downrange landing of a Falcon Heavy or any Falcon booster on this mission.	Partial failure	The booster before tipping over during transport
31	4 May 2019	OCISLY	SpaceX CRS-17	Falcon 9 first stage B1056.1 landed on OCISLY during the SpaceX CRS-17 mission. The landing was originally scheduled for Landing Zone 1, but was switched after an explosion in a test of a Crew Dragon capsule at LZ1. The launch of CRS-17 was delayed due to generator issues on the drone ship.	Success	
32	24 May 2019	OCISLY	Starlink L0	Falcon 9 first stage B1049.3 landed on OCISLY during the Starlink mission to launch 60 satellites.	Success	
33	25 June 2019	OCISLY	Space Test Program Flight 2	Falcon Heavy center core from the STP-2 mission failed to land on the OCISLY due to lack of control from a failure with the thrust vectoring control in the center engine; the side cores landed successfully on ground pads. SpaceX was trying to land the booster with less fuel than normal so the landing target was stationed a record-breaking 1240 km (770 mi) off the coast of Florida — almost 30% further than any previous recovery attempt. The extra heat caused by less braking than normal damaged the engine.	Failure	
34	11 November 2019	OCISLY	Starlink L1	Falcon 9 first stage B1048.4 landed on OCISLY during the second large batch Starlink mission to launch 60 satellites. This was the first time that a Falcon 9 booster made a fourth flight and landing.	Success	
35	5 December 2019	OCISLY	SpaceX CRS-19	Falcon 9 first stage B1059.1 successfully landed on OCISLY following the launch of the SpaceX CRS-19 commercial resupply mission. It was the first flight and landing for this booster.	Success	
36	16 December 2019	OCISLY	JSAT-18	Falcon 9 first stage B1056.3 successfully landed on OCISLY following the launch of the Kacific-1/JCSAT-18 communications satellite. It was the third flight and landing for this booster.	Success	
37	7 January 2020	OCISLY	Starlink L2	Falcon 9 first stage B1049.4 successfully landed on OCISLY following the launch of Starlink L2, which was third large batch of Starlink satellites.	Success	
38	29 January 2020	OCISLY	Starlink L3	Falcon 9 first stage B1051.3 successfully landed third time on OCISLY following the launch of Starlink L3, which was fourth batch of 60 Starlink satellites launched from Space Launch Complex 40 at Cape Canaveral Air Force Station in Florida.	Success	
39	17 February 2020	OCISLY	Starlink L4	Falcon 9 first stage B1056.4 made a water landing following the launch of Starlink L4, which was the fifth batch of 60 Starlink satellites. The first stage booster failed to land on the drone ship making it the first landing failure of flight proven booster. The booster diverted from the droneship as wind data loaded into booster was different from the actual winds.	Failure	
40	18 March 2020	OCISLY	Starlink L5	Falcon 9 first stage B1048.5 failed to land on OCISLY after an engine anomaly during launch. After a launch abort at T-0s due to out of family data during an engine power check on 15 March 2020, the launch was postponed until 18 March 2020. At T+2:22, an engine shutdown occurred, the second one to ever have happened on a Falcon 9 flight since CRS-1. It performed the entry burn nominally but then at T+7:30 the downlink feed cut out. It is presumed that the booster either broke up in the atmosphere or crashed into the ocean. It was later confirmed by Elon Musk on Twitter that a small amount of isopropyl alcohol was trapped in a sensor dead leg and was ignited during flight.	Failure	
41	22 April 2020	OCISLY	Starlink L6	Falcon 9 first stage B1051.4 successfully landed on OCISLY. It was the 4th flight and landing for this booster.	Success	
42	30 May 2020	OCISLY	Crew Dragon Demo-2	Falcon 9 first stage B1058.1 successfully landed on OCISLY following the launch of Crew Dragon Demo-2. This was SpaceX's first crewed mission and the first Falcon 9 first stage to launch humans into orbit and successfully return to Earth.	Success	
43	3 June 2020	JRTI	Starlink L7	Falcon 9 first stage B1049.5 successfully landed on JRTI following the launch of Starlink L7. This marks only the second time a Falcon core has been able to fly five times.	Success	
44	13 June 2020	OCISLY	Starlink L8	Falcon 9 first stage B1059.3 successfully landed on OCISLY. It was the 3rd flight and landing for this booster.	Success	
45	30 June 2020	JRTI	GPS III SV03	Falcon 9 first stage B1060.1 successfully landed on JRTI.	Success	
46	20 July 2020	JRTI	ANASIS-II	Falcon 9 first stage B1058.2, already used in the Crew Dragon Demo 2 mission, successfully landed on JRTI.	Success	
47	7 August 2020	OCISLY	Starlink L9	Falcon 9 first stage B1051.5 successfully landed on OCISLY. This marks the third time a Falcon booster has been able to fly five times.	Success	
48	18 August 2020	OCISLY	Starlink L10	Falcon 9 first stage B1049.6 successfully landed on OCISLY. This is the first time that a Falcon booster has been able to fly six times.	Success	
49	3 September 2020	OCISLY	Starlink L11	Falcon 9 first stage B1060.2 successfully landed on OCISLY.	Success	
50	6 October 2020	OCISLY	Starlink L12	Falcon 9 first stage B1058.3 successfully landed on OCISLY.	Success	
51	18 October 2020	OCISLY	Starlink L13	Falcon 9 first stage B1051.6 successfully landed on OCISLY.	Success	
52	24 October 2020	JRTI	Starlink L14	Falcon 9 first stage B1060.3 successfully landed on JRTI.	Success	
53	5 November 2020	OCISLY	GPS III SV04	Falcon 9 first stage B1062.1 successfully landed on OCISLY.	Success	
54	15 November 2020	JRTI	SpaceX Crew-1	Falcon 9 first stage B1061.1 successfully landed on JRTI.	Success	
55	25 November 2020	OCISLY	Starlink L15	Falcon 9 first stage B1049.7 successfully landed on OCISLY.	Success	
56	6 December 2020	OCISLY	SpaceX CRS-21	Falcon 9 first stage B1058.4 successfully landed on OCISLY.	Success	
57	13 December 2020	JRTI	SXM 7	Falcon 9 first stage B1051.7 successfully landed on JRTI.	Success	
58	6 January 2021	JRTI	Türksat 5A	Falcon 9 first stage B1060.4 successfully landed on JRTI.	Success	
59	20 January 2021	JRTI	Starlink L16	Falcon 9 first stage B1051.8 successfully landed on JRTI.	Success	
60	24 January 2021	OCISLY	Transporter-1	Falcon 9 first stage B1058.5 successfully landed on OCISLY.	Success	
61	4 February 2021	OCISLY	Starlink L18	Falcon 9 first stage B1060.5 successfully landed on OCISLY.	Success	
62	16 February 2021	OCISLY	Starlink L19	Falcon 9 first stage B1059.6 failed to land on OCISLY due to a heating problem near the engines' heatshield.	Failure	
63	4 March 2021	OCISLY	Starlink L17	Falcon 9 first stage B1049.8 successfully landed on OCISLY.	Success	
64	11 March 2021	JRTI	Starlink L20	Falcon 9 first stage B1058.6 successfully landed on JRTI.	Success	
65	14 March 2021	OCISLY	Starlink L21	Falcon 9 first stage B1051.9 successfully landed on OCISLY.	Success	
66	24 March 2021	OCISLY	Starlink L22	Falcon 9 first stage B1060.6 successfully landed on OCISLY.	Success	
67	7 April 2021	OCISLY	Starlink L23	Falcon 9 first stage B1058.7 successfully landed on OCISLY.	Success	
68	23 April 2021	OCISLY	SpaceX Crew-2	Falcon 9 first stage B1061.2 successfully landed on OCISLY.	Success	
69	29 April 2021	JRTI	Starlink L24	Falcon 9 first stage B1060.7 successfully landed on JRTI.	Success	
70	4 May 2021	OCISLY	Starlink L25	Falcon 9 first stage B1049.9 successfully landed on OCISLY.	Success	
71	9 May 2021	JRTI	Starlink L27	Falcon 9 first stage B1051.10 successfully landed on JRTI.	Success	
72	15 May 2021	OCISLY	Starlink L26	Falcon 9 first stage B1058.8 successfully landed on OCISLY.	Success	
73	26 May 2021	JRTI	Starlink L28	Falcon 9 first stage B1063.2 successfully landed on JRTI.	Success	
74	3 June 2021	OCISLY	SpaceX CRS-22	Falcon 9 first stage B1067.1 successfully landed on OCISLY.	Success	
75	6 June 2021	JRTI	SXM 8	Falcon 9 first stage B1061.2 successfully landed on JRTI.	Success	
76	17 June 2021	JRTI	GPS III SV05	Falcon 9 first stage B1062.2 successfully landed on JRTI.	Success	
77	29 August 2021	ASOG	SpaceX CRS-23	First time Falcon 9 first stage landing attempt to be done on ASOG. The booster recovered is B1061.4.	Success	
78	13 September 2021	OCISLY	Starlink Group 2-1	Falcon 9 first stage B1049.10 successfully landed on OCISLY.	Success	
79	15 September 2021	JRTI	Inspiration4	Falcon 9 first stage B1062.3 successfully landed on JRTI.	Success	
80	11 November 2021	ASOG	SpaceX Crew-3	Falcon 9 first stage B1067.2 successfully landed on ASOG. Originally the droneship JRTI was assigned to recover the first stage booster for this mission, but after JRTI recovery team was struck by harsh weather conditions while being at sea even after launch delays, ASOG was reassigned for this mission's booster recovery.	Success	
81	13 November 2021	JRTI	Starlink Group 4-1	Falcon 9 first stage B1058.9 successfully landed on JRTI.	Success	
82	24 November 2021	OCISLY	DART	Falcon 9 first stage B1063.3 successfully landed on OCISLY.	Success	
83	2 December 2021	ASOG	Starlink Group 4-3	Falcon 9 first stage B1060.9 successfully landed on ASOG.	Success	
84	9 December 2021	JRTI	IXPE	Falcon 9 first stage B1061.5 successfully landed on JRTI.	Success	
85	18 December 2021	OCISLY	Starlink Group 4-4	Falcon 9 first stage B1051.11 successfully landed on OCISLY.	Success	
86	19 December 2021	ASOG	Türksat 5B	Falcon 9 first stage B1067.3 successfully landed on ASOG.	Success	
87	21 December 2021	JRTI	SpaceX CRS-24	Falcon 9 first stage B1069.1 successfully landed on JRTI.	Success	
88	6 January 2022	ASOG	Starlink Group 4-5	Falcon 9 first stage B1062.4 successfully landed on ASOG.	Success	
89	18 January 2022	ASOG	Starlink Group 4-6	Falcon 9 first stage B1060.10 successfully landed on ASOG.	Success	
90	3 February 2022	ASOG	Starlink Group 4-7	Falcon 9 first stage B1061.6 successfully landed on ASOG.	Success	
91	21 February 2022	ASOG	Starlink Group 4-8	Falcon 9 first stage B1058.11 successfully landed on ASOG.	Success	
92	25 February 2022	OCISLY	Starlink Group 4-11	Falcon 9 first stage B1063.4 successfully landed on OCISLY.	Success	
93	3 March 2022	JRTI	Starlink Group 4-9	Falcon 9 first stage B1060.11 successfully landed on JRTI.	Success	
94	9 March 2022	ASOG	Starlink Group 4-10	Falcon 9 first stage B1052.4 successfully landed on ASOG.	Success	
95	19 March 2022	JRTI	Starlink Group 4-12	Falcon 9 first stage B1051.12 successfully landed on JRTI.	Success	
96	1 April 2022	JRTI	Transporter 4	Falcon 9 first stage B1061.7 successfully landed on JRTI.	Success	
97	8 April 2022	ASOG	Axiom Mission 1	Falcon 9 first stage B1062.5 successfully landed on ASOG.	Success	
98	21 April 2022	JRTI	Starlink Group 4-14	Falcon 9 first stage B1060.12 successfully landed on JRTI.	Success	
99	27 April 2022	ASOG	SpaceX Crew-4	Falcon 9 first stage B1067.4 successfully landed on ASOG.	Success	
100	29 April 2022	JRTI	Starlink Group 4-16	Falcon 9 first stage B1062.6 successfully landed on JRTI.	Success	
101	7 May 2022	ASOG	Starlink Group 4-17	Falcon 9 first stage B1058.12 successfully landed on ASOG. 100th ASDS landing attempt by SpaceX.	Success	
102	13 May 2022	OCISLY	Starlink Group 4-13	Falcon 9 first stage B1063.5 successfully landed on OCISLY.	Success	
103	14 May 2022	JRTI	Starlink Group 4-15	Falcon 9 first stage B1073.1 successfully landed on JRTI.	Success	
104	18 May 2022	ASOG	Starlink Group 4-18	Falcon 9 first stage B1052.5 successfully landed on ASOG.	Success	
105	8 June 2022	JRTI	Nilesat-301	Falcon 9 first stage B1062.7 successfully landed on JRTI. SpaceX successfully executed furthest downrange landing of a Falcon 9 booster on this mission.	Success	
106	17 June 2022	ASOG	Starlink Group 4-19	Falcon 9 first stage B1060.13 successfully landed on ASOG.	Success	
107	19 June 2022	JRTI	Globalstar-2 M087 (FM15); USA 328-331	Falcon 9 first stage B1061.9 successfully landed on JRTI.	Success	
108	29 June 2022	ASOG	SES-22	Falcon 9 first stage B1073.2 successfully landed on ASOG.	Success	
109	7 July 2022	JRTI	Starlink Group 4-21	Falcon 9 first stage B1058.13 successfully landed on JRTI.	Success	
110	11 July 2022	OCISLY	Starlink Group 3-1	Falcon 9 first stage B1063.6 successfully landed on OCISLY.	Success	
111	14 July 2022	ASOG	SpaceX CRS-25	Falcon 9 first stage B1067.5 successfully landed on ASOG.	Success	
112	17 July 2022	JRTI	Starlink Group 4-22	Falcon 9 first stage B1051.13 successfully landed on JRTI.	Success	
113	22 July 2022	OCISLY	Starlink Group 3-2	Falcon 9 first stage B1071.4 successfully landed on OCISLY.	Success	
114	24 July 2022	ASOG	Starlink Group 4-25	Falcon 9 first stage B1062.8 successfully landed on ASOG.	Success	
115	4 August 2022	JRTI	KPLO	Falcon 9 first stage B1052.6 successfully landed on JRTI.	Success	
116	9 August 2022	ASOG	Starlink Group 4-26	Falcon 9 first stage B1073.3 successfully landed on ASOG.	Success	
117	12 August 2022	OCISLY	Starlink Group 3-3	Falcon 9 first stage B1061.10 successfully landed on OCISLY.	Success	
118	19 August 2022	ASOG	Starlink Group 4-27	Falcon 9 first stage B1062.9 successfully landed on ASOG.	Success	
119	28 August 2022	ASOG	Starlink Group 4-23	Falcon 9 first stage B1069.2 successfully landed on ASOG.	Success	
120	30 August 2022	OCISLY	Starlink Group 3-4	Falcon 9 first stage B1063.7 successfully landed on OCISLY.	Success	
121	5 September 2022	JRTI	Starlink Group 4-20	Falcon 9 first stage B1052.7 successfully landed on JRTI.	Success	
122	11 September 2022	ASOG	Starlink Group 4-2	Falcon 9 first stage B1058.14 successfully landed on ASOG.	Success	
123	19 September 2022	JRTI	Starlink Group 4-34	Falcon 9 first stage B1067.6 successfully landed on JRTI.	Success	
124	24 September 2022	ASOG	Starlink Group 4-35	Falcon 9 first stage B1073.4 successfully landed on ASOG.	Success	
125	5 October 2022	JRTI	SpaceX Crew-5	Falcon 9 first stage B1077.1 successfully landed on JRTI.	Success	
126	5 October 2022	OCISLY	Starlink Group 4-29	Falcon 9 first stage B1071.5 successfully landed on OCISLY.	Success	
127	8 October 2022	ASOG	Galaxy 33 & 34	Falcon 9 first stage B1060.14 successfully landed on ASOG.	Success	
128	15 October 2022	JRTI	Hotbird 13F	Falcon 9 first stage B1069.3 successfully landed on JRTI.	Success	
129	20 October 2022	ASOG	Starlink Group 4-36	Falcon 9 first stage B1062.10 successfully landed on ASOG.	Success	
130	28 October 2022	OCISLY	Starlink Group 4-31	Falcon 9 first stage B1063.8 successfully landed on OCISLY.	Success	
131	3 November 2022	JRTI	Hotbird 13G	Falcon 9 first stage B1067.7 successfully landed on JRTI.	Success	
132	26 November 2022	JRTI	SpaceX CRS-26	Falcon 9 first stage B1076.1 successfully landed on JRTI.	Success	
133	16 December 2022	ASOG	O3b mPOWER 1 & 2	Falcon 9 first stage B1067.8 successfully landed on ASOG.	Success	
134	17 December 2022	JRTI	Starlink Group 4-37	Falcon 9 first stage B1058.15 successfully landed on JRTI.	Success	
135	28 December 2022	ASOG	Starlink Group 5-1	Falcon 9 first stage B1062.11 successfully landed on ASOG.	Success	
136	18 January 2023	ASOG	GPS III SV06	Falcon 9 first stage B1077.2 successfully landed on ASOG.	Success	
137	19 January 2023	OCISLY	Starlink Group 2-4	Falcon 9 first stage B1075.1 successfully landed on OCISLY.	Success	
138	26 January 2023	JRTI	Starlink Group 5-2	Falcon 9 first stage B1067.9 successfully landed on JRTI.	Success	
139	31 January 2023	OCISLY	Starlink Group 2-6	Falcon 9 first stage B1071.7 successfully landed on OCISLY.	Success	
140	2 February 2023	ASOG	Starlink Group 5-3	Falcon 9 first stage B1069.5 successfully landed on ASOG.	Success	
141	7 February 2023	JRTI	Amazonas Nexus	Falcon 9 first stage B1073.6 successfully landed on JRTI.	Success	
142	12 February 2023	ASOG	Starlink Group 5-4	Falcon 9 first stage B1062.12 successfully landed on ASOG.	Success	
143	17 February 2023	OCISLY	Starlink Group 2-5	Falcon 9 first stage B1063.9 successfully landed on OCISLY.	Success	
144	18 February 2023	JRTI	Inmarsat-6 F2	Falcon 9 first stage B1077.3 successfully landed on JRTI.	Success	
145	27 February 2023	ASOG	Starlink Group 6-1	Falcon 9 first stage B1076.3 successfully landed on ASOG.	Success	
146	2 March 2023	JRTI	SpaceX Crew-6	Falcon 9 first stage B1078.1 successfully landed on JRTI.	Success	
147	3 March 2023	OCISLY	Starlink Group 2-7	Falcon 9 first stage B1061.12 successfully landed on OCISLY.	Success	
148	15 March 2023	ASOG	SpaceX CRS-27	Falcon 9 first stage B1073.7 successfully landed on ASOG.	Success	
149	17 March 2023	OCISLY	Starlink Group 2-8	Falcon 9 first stage B1071.8 successfully landed on OCISLY.	Success	
150	17 March 2023	JRTI	SES-18 & SES-19	Falcon 9 first stage B1069.6 successfully landed on JRTI.	Success	
151	24 March 2023	ASOG	Starlink Group 5-5	Falcon 9 first stage B1067.10 successfully landed on ASOG.	Success	
152	29 March 2023	JRTI	Starlink Group 5-10	Falcon 9 first stage B1077.4 successfully landed on JRTI.	Success	
153	7 April 2023	ASOG	Intelsat 40e/TEMPO	Falcon 9 first stage B1076.4 successfully landed on ASOG.	Success	
154	19 April 2023	ASOG	Starlink Group 6-2	Falcon 9 first stage B1073.8 successfully landed on ASOG.	Success	
155	27 April 2023	OCISLY	Starlink Group 3-5	Falcon 9 first stage B1061.13 successfully landed on OCISLY.	Success	
156	28 April 2023	JRTI	O3b mPOWER 3 & 4	Falcon 9 first stage B1078.2 successfully landed on JRTI.	Success	
157	4 May 2023	ASOG	Starlink Group 5-6	Falcon 9 first stage B1069.7 successfully landed on ASOG.	Success	
158	10 May 2023	OCISLY	Starlink Group 2-9	Falcon 9 first stage B1075.3 successfully landed on OCISLY.	Success	
159	14 May 2023	JRTI	Starlink Group 5-9	Falcon 9 first stage B1067.11 successfully landed on JRTI.	Success	
160	19 May 2023	ASOG	Starlink Group 6-3	Falcon 9 first stage B1076.5 successfully landed on ASOG.	Success	
161	20 May 2023	OCISLY	Iridium-9 & OneWeb #19	Falcon 9 first stage B1063.11 successfully landed on OCISLY.	Success	
162	27 May 2023	JRTI	Arabsat 7B (Badr-8)	Falcon 9 first stage B1062.14 successfully landed on JRTI.	Success	
163	31 May 2023	OCISLY	Starlink Group 2-10	Falcon 9 first stage B1061.14 successfully landed on OCISLY.	Success	
164	4 June 2023	JRTI	Starlink Group 6-4	Falcon 9 first stage B1078.3 successfully landed on JRTI.	Success	
165	5 June 2023	ASOG	SpaceX CRS-28	Falcon 9 first stage B1077.5 successfully landed on ASOG.	Success	
166	12 June 2023	JRTI	Starlink Group 5-11	Falcon 9 first stage B1073.9 successfully landed on JRTI.	Success	
167	18 June 2023	ASOG	Satria	Falcon 9 first stage B1067.12 successfully landed on ASOG.	Success	
168	22 June 2023	OCISLY	Starlink Group 5-7	Falcon 9 first stage B1075.4 successfully landed on OCISLY.	Success	
169	23 June 2023	JRTI	Starlink Group 5-12	Falcon 9 first stage B1069.8 successfully landed on JRTI.	Success	
170	1 July 2023	ASOG	Euclid Telescope	Falcon 9 first stage B1080.2 successfully landed on ASOG.	Success	
171	7 July 2023	OCISLY	Starlink Group 5-13	Falcon 9 first stage B1063.12 successfully landed on OCISLY.	Success	
172	10 July 2023	JRTI	Starlink Group 6-5	Falcon 9 first stage B1058.16 successfully landed on JRTI.	Success	
173	16 July 2023	ASOG	Starlink Group 5-15	Falcon 9 first stage B1060.16 successfully landed on ASOG.	Success	
174	20 July 2023	OCISLY	Starlink Group 6-15	Falcon 9 first stage B1071.10 successfully landed on OCISLY.	Success	
175	24 July 2023	JRTI	Starlink Group 6-6	Falcon 9 first stage B1076.6 successfully landed on JRTI.	Success	
176	28 July 2023	ASOG	Starlink Group 6-7	Falcon 9 first stage B1062.15 successfully landed on ASOG.	Success	
177	3 August 2023	JRTI	Galaxy 37	Falcon 9 first stage B1077.6 successfully landed on JRTI.	Success	
178	7 August 2023	ASOG	Starlink Group 6-8	Falcon 9 first stage B1078.4 successfully landed on ASOG.	Success	
179	8 August 2023	OCISLY	Starlink Group 6-20	Falcon 9 first stage B1075.5 successfully landed on OCISLY.	Success	
180	11 August 2023	JRTI	Starlink Group 6-9	Falcon 9 first stage B1069.9 successfully landed on JRTI.	Success	
181	17 August 2023	ASOG	Starlink Group 6-10	Falcon 9 first stage B1067.13 successfully landed on ASOG.	Success	
182	22 August 2023	OCISLY	Starlink Group 7-1	Falcon 9 first stage B1061.15 successfully landed on OCISLY.	Success	
183	27 August 2023	JRTI	Starlink Group 6-11	Falcon 9 first stage B1080.3 successfully landed on JRTI.	Success	
184	1 September 2023	ASOG	Starlink Group 6-13	Falcon 9 first stage B1077.7 successfully landed on ASOG.	Success	
185	4 September 2023	JRTI	Starlink Group 6-12	Falcon 9 first stage B1073.10 successfully landed on JRTI.	Success	
186	9 September 2023	ASOG	Starlink Group 6-14	Falcon 9 first stage B1076.7 successfully landed on ASOG.	Success	
187	12 September 2023	OCISLY	Starlink Group 7-2	Falcon 9 first stage B1071.11 successfully landed on OCISLY.	Success	
188	16 September 2023	JRTI	Starlink Group 6-16	Falcon 9 first stage B1078.5 successfully landed on JRTI.	Success	
189	20 September 2023	ASOG	Starlink Group 6-17	Falcon 9 first stage B1058.17 successfully landed on ASOG.	Success	
190	24 September 2023	JRTI	Starlink Group 6-18	Falcon 9 first stage B1060.17 successfully landed on JRTI.	Success	
191	25 September 2023	OCISLY	Starlink Group 7-3	Falcon 9 first stage B1075.6 successfully landed on OCISLY.	Success	
192	30 September 2023	ASOG	Starlink Group 6-19	Falcon 9 first stage B1069.10 successfully landed on ASOG.	Success	
193	5 October 2023	JRTI	Starlink Group 6-21	Falcon 9 first stage B1076.8 successfully landed on JRTI.	Success	
194	9 October 2023	OCISLY	Starlink Group 7-4	Falcon 9 first stage B1063.14 successfully landed on OCISLY.	Success	
195	13 October 2023	ASOG	Starlink Group 6-22	Falcon 9 first stage B1067.14 successfully landed on ASOG.	Success	
196	18 October 2023	JRTI	Starlink Group 6-23	Falcon 9 first stage B1062.16 successfully landed on JRTI.	Success	
197	21 October 2023	OCISLY	Starlink Group 7-5	Falcon 9 first stage B1061.16 successfully landed on OCISLY.	Success	
198	22 October 2023	ASOG	Starlink Group 6-24	Falcon 9 first stage B1080.4 successfully landed on ASOG.	Success	
199	29 October 2023	OCISLY	Starlink Group 7-6	Falcon 9 first stage B1075.7 successfully landed on OCISLY.	Success	
200	30 October 2023	JRTI	Starlink Group 6-25	Falcon 9 first stage B1077.8 successfully landed on JRTI.	Success	
201	4 November 2023	ASOG	Starlink Group 6-26	Falcon 9 first stage B1058.18 successfully landed on ASOG.	Success	
202	8 November 2023	JRTI	Starlink Group 6-27	Falcon 9 first stage B1073.11 successfully landed on JRTI.	Success	
203	12 November 2023	ASOG	O3b mPOWER 5 & 6	Falcon 9 first stage B1076.9 successfully landed on ASOG.	Success	
204	18 November 2023	JRTI	Starlink Group 6-28	Falcon 9 first stage B1069.11 successfully landed on JRTI.	Success	
205	20 November 2023	OCISLY	Starlink Group 7-7	Falcon 9 first stage B1063.15 successfully landed on OCISLY.	Success	
206	22 November 2023	ASOG	Starlink Group 6-29	Falcon 9 first stage B1067.15 successfully landed on ASOG.	Success	
207	28 November 2023	JRTI	Starlink Group 6-30	Falcon 9 first stage B1062.17 successfully landed on JRTI.	Success	
208	3 December 2023	ASOG	Starlink Group 6-31	Falcon 9 first stage B1078.6 successfully landed on ASOG.	Success	
209	7 December 2023	JRTI	Starlink Group 6-33	Falcon 9 first stage B1077.9 successfully landed on JRTI.	Success	
210	8 December 2023	OCISLY	Starlink Group 7-8	Falcon 9 first stage B1071.13 successfully landed on OCISLY. 200th landing on a droneship by a Falcon booster.	Success	
211	19 December 2023	ASOG	Starlink Group 6-34	Falcon 9 first stage B1081.3 successfully landed on ASOG.	Success	
212	23 December 2023	JRTI	Starlink Group 6-32	Falcon 9 first stage B1058.19 initially successfully landed on JRTI. Due to waves and strong winds, the B1058 booster tilted during transport and was destroyed.	Partial failure	
213	29 December 2023	ASOG	Starlink Group 6-36	Falcon 9 first stage B1069.12 successfully landed on ASOG.	Success	
214	3 January 2024	OCISLY	Starlink Group 7-9	Falcon 9 first stage B1082.1 successfully landed on OCISLY.	Success	
215	7 January 2024	ASOG	Starlink Group 6-35	Falcon 9 first stage B1067.16 successfully landed on ASOG.	Success	
216	14 January 2024	OCISLY	Starlink Group 7-10	Falcon 9 first stage B1061.18 successfully landed on OCISLY.	Success	
217	15 January 2024	ASOG	Starlink Group 6-37	Falcon 9 first stage B1073.12 successfully landed on ASOG. 190th landing in a row since the last landing failure and this was also the shortest time between landings on any droneship at just a bit over seven days.	Success	
218	24 January 2024	OCISLY	Starlink Group 7-11	Falcon 9 first stage B1063.16 successfully landed on OCISLY.	Success	
219	29 January 2024	ASOG	Starlink Group 6-38	Falcon 9 first stage B1062.18 successfully landed on ASOG.	Success	
220	29 January 2024	OCISLY	Starlink Group 7-12	Falcon 9 first stage B1075.9 successfully landed on OCISLY. This landing marked the fastest turnaround of a droneship at just over 5 days.	Success	
221	10 February 2024	OCISLY	Starlink Group 7-13	Falcon 9 first stage B1071.14 successfully landed on OCISLY.	Success	
222	15 February 2024	OCISLY	Starlink Group 7-14	Falcon 9 first stage B1082.2 successfully landed on OCISLY. 200th Successful Consecutive Landing for the orbital class Falcon booster.	Success	
223	20 February 2024	JRTI	HTS-113BT (Merah Putih 2)	Falcon 9 first stage B1067.17 successfully landed on JRTI.	Success	
224	23 February 2024	OCISLY	Starlink Group 7-15	Falcon 9 first stage B1061.19 successfully landed on OCISLY.	Success	
225	25 February 2024	ASOG	Starlink Group 6-39	Falcon 9 first stage B1069.13 successfully landed on ASOG.	Success	
226	29 February 2024	JRTI	Starlink Group 6-40	Falcon 9 first stage B1076.11 successfully landed on JRTI.	Success	
227	4 March 2024	ASOG	Starlink Group 6-41	Falcon 9 first stage B1073.13 successfully landed on ASOG.	Success	
228	10 March 2024	JRTI	Starlink Group 6-43	Falcon 9 first stage B1077.11 successfully landed on JRTI.	Success	
229	11 March 2024	OCISLY	Starlink Group 7-17	Falcon 9 first stage B1063.17 successfully landed on OCISLY.	Success	
230	16 March 2024	ASOG	Starlink Group 6-44	Falcon 9 first stage B1062.19 successfully landed on ASOG.	Success	
231	19 March 2024	OCISLY	Starlink Group 7-16	Falcon 9 first stage B1075.10 successfully landed on OCISLY.	Success	
232	24 March 2024	JRTI	Starlink Group 6-42	Falcon 9 first stage B1060.19 successfully landed on JRTI.	Success	
233	25 March 2024	ASOG	Starlink Group 6-46	Falcon 9 first stage B1078.8 successfully landed on ASOG.	Success	
234	30 March 2024	JRTI	Eutelsat 36D	Falcon 9 first stage B1076.12 successfully landed on JRTI.	Success	
235	31 March 2024	ASOG	Starlink Group 6-45	Falcon 9 first stage B1067.18 successfully landed on ASOG.	Success	
236	2 April 2024	OCISLY	Starlink Group 7-18	Falcon 9 first stage B1071.15 successfully landed on OCISLY.	Success	
237	5 April 2024	ASOG	Starlink Group 6-47	Falcon 9 first stage B1069.14 successfully landed on ASOG.	Success	
238	7 April 2024	OCISLY	Starlink Group 8-1	Falcon 9 first stage B1081.6 successfully landed on OCISLY.	Success	
239	10 April 2024	JRTI	Starlink Group 6-48	Falcon 9 first stage B1083.2 successfully landed on JRTI.	Success	
240	13 April 2024	ASOG	Starlink Group 6-49	Falcon 9 first stage B1062.20 successfully landed on ASOG.	Success	
241	17 April 2024	JRTI	Starlink Group 6-51	Falcon 9 first stage B1077.12 successfully landed on JRTI.	Success	
242	18 April 2024	ASOG	Starlink Group 6-52	Falcon 9 first stage B1080.7 successfully landed on ASOG.	Success	
243	23 April 2024	JRTI	Starlink Group 6-53	Falcon 9 first stage B1078.9 successfully landed on JRTI.	Success	
244	28 April 2024	JRTI	Starlink Group 6-54	Falcon 9 first stage B1076.13 successfully landed on JRTI.	Success	
245	3 May 2024	ASOG	Starlink Group 6-55	Falcon 9 first stage B1067.19 successfully landed on ASOG.	Success	
246	6 May 2024	JRTI	Starlink Group 6-57	Falcon 9 first stage B1069.15 successfully landed on JRTI.	Success	
247	8 May 2024	ASOG	Starlink Group 6-56	Falcon 9 first stage B1083.3 successfully landed on ASOG.	Success	
248	10 May 2024	OCISLY	Starlink Group 8-2	Falcon 9 first stage B1082.4 successfully landed on OCISLY.	Success	
249	13 May 2024	ASOG	Starlink Group 6-58	Falcon 9 first stage B1073.15 successfully landed on ASOG.	Success	
250	14 May 2024	OCISLY	Starlink Group 8-7	Falcon 9 first stage B1063.18 successfully landed on OCISLY.	Success	
251	18 May 2024	ASOG	Starlink Group 6-59	Falcon 9 first stage B1062.21 successfully landed on ASOG.	Success	
252	22 May 2024	OCISLY	NROL-146	Falcon 9 first stage B1071.16 successfully landed on OCISLY.	Success	
253	23 May 2024	ASOG	Starlink Group 6-62	Falcon 9 first stage B1080.8 successfully landed on ASOG.	Success	
254	24 May 2024	JRTI	Starlink Group 6-63	Falcon 9 first stage B1077.13 successfully landed on JRTI.	Success	
255	28 May 2024	ASOG	Starlink Group 6-60	Falcon 9 first stage B1078.10 successfully landed on ASOG.	Success	
256	1 June 2024	ASOG	Starlink Group 6-64	Falcon 9 first stage B1076.14 successfully landed on ASOG.	Success	
257	5 June 2024	JRTI	Starlink Group 8-5	Falcon 9 first stage B1067.20 successfully landed on JRTI.	Success	
258	8 June 2024	ASOG	Starlink Group 10-1	Falcon 9 first stage B1069.16 successfully landed on ASOG.	Success	
259	8 June 2024	OCISLY	Starlink Group 8-8	Falcon 9 first stage B1061.21 successfully landed on OCISLY.	Success	
260	19 June 2024	OCISLY	Starlink Group 9-1	Falcon 9 first stage B1082.5 successfully landed on OCISLY.	Success	
261	20 June 2024	JRTI	Astra 1P/SES-24	Falcon 9 first stage B1080.9 successfully landed on JRTI.	Success	
262	23 June 2024	ASOG	Starlink Group 10-2	Falcon 9 first stage B1078.11 successfully landed on ASOG.	Success	
263	24 June 2024	OCISLY	Starlink Group 9-2	Falcon 9 first stage B1075.11 successfully landed on OCISLY.	Success	
264	27 June 2024	JRTI	Starlink Group 10-3	Falcon 9 first stage B1062.22 successfully landed on JRTI.	Success	
265	29 June 2024	OCISLY	NROL-186	Falcon 9 first stage B1081.8 successfully landed on OCISLY.	Success	
266	3 July 2024	ASOG	Starlink Group 8-9	Falcon 9 first stage B1073.16 successfully landed on ASOG.	Success	
267	8 July 2024	JRTI	Türksat 6A	Falcon 9 first stage B1076.15 successfully landed on JRTI.	Success	
268	12 July 2024	OCISLY	Starlink Group 9-3	Falcon 9 first stage B1063.19 successfully landed on OCISLY.	Success	
269	27 July 2024	JRTI	Starlink Group 10-9	Falcon 9 first stage B1069.17 successfully landed on JRTI.	Success	
270	28 July 2024	ASOG	Starlink Group 10-4	Falcon 9 first stage B1077.14 successfully landed on ASOG.	Success	
271	28 July 2024	OCISLY	Starlink Group 9-4	Falcon 9 first stage B1071.17 successfully landed on OCISLY.	Success	
272	2 August 2024	ASOG	Starlink Group 10-6	Falcon 9 first stage B1078.12 successfully landed on ASOG.	Success	
273	4 August 2024	OCISLY	Starlink Group 11-1	Falcon 9 first stage B1082.6 successfully landed on OCISLY.	Success	
274	10 August 2024	JRTI	Starlink Group 8-3	Falcon 9 first stage B1067.21 successfully landed on JRTI.	Success	
275	12 August 2024	OCISLY	ASBM 1 & ASBM 2	Falcon 9 first stage B1061.22 successfully landed on OCISLY.	Success	
276	12 August 2024	ASOG	Starlink Group 10-7	Falcon 9 first stage B1073.17 successfully landed on ASOG.	Success	
277	20 August 2024	ASOG	Starlink Group 10-5	Falcon 9 first stage B1085.1 successfully landed on ASOG.	Success	
278	28 August 2024	ASOG	Starlink Group 8-6	Falcon 9 first stage B1062.23 fell over after landing attempt on ASOG. This was the boosters 23rd mission. This breaks the longest streak of 268 landing successes since Starlink 19 v1.0 mission and was the first ASOG landing failure.	Failure	
279	31 August 2024	JRTI	Starlink Group 8-10	Falcon 9 first stage B1069.18 successfully landed on JRTI.	Success	
280	31 August 2024	OCISLY	Starlink Group 9-5	Falcon 9 first stage B1081.9 successfully landed on OCISLY.	Success	
281	5 September 2024	JRTI	Starlink Group 8-11	Falcon 9 first stage B1077.15 successfully landed on JRTI.	Success	
282	6 September 2024	OCISLY	NROL-113	Falcon 9 first stage B1063.20 successfully landed on OCISLY. 100th successfully landing on OCISLY.	Success	
283	10 September 2024	JRTI	Polaris Dawn	Falcon 9 first stage B1083.4 successfully landed on JRTI.	Success	
284	13 September 2024	OCISLY	Starlink Group 9-6	Falcon 9 first stage B1071.18 successfully landed on OCISLY.	Success	
285	17 September 2024	JRTI	Galileo-L13 (FOC FM26 & FM32	Falcon 9 first stage B1067.22 successfully landed on JRTI.	Success	
286	20 September 2024	OCISLY	Starlink Group 9-17	Falcon 9 first stage B1075.13 successfully landed on OCISLY.	Success	
287	25 September 2024	OCISLY	Starlink Group 9-8	Falcon 9 first stage B1081.10 successfully landed on OCISLY.	Success	
288	15 October 2024	ASOG	Starlink Group 10-10	Falcon 9 first stage B1080.11 successfully landed on ASOG.	Success	
289	15 October 2024	OCISLY	Starlink Group 9-7	Falcon 9 first stage B1071.19 successfully landed on OCISLY.	Success	
290	18 October 2024	JRTI	Starlink Group 8-19	Falcon 9 first stage B1076.17 successfully landed on JRTI.	Success	
291	23 October 2024	ASOG	Starlink Group 6-61	Falcon 9 first stage B1073.18 successfully landed on ASOG.	Success	
292	24 October 2024	OCISLY	NROL-167	Falcon 9 first stage B1063.21 successfully landed on OCISLY.	Success	
293	26 October 2024	JRTI	Starlink Group 10-8	Falcon 9 first stage B1069.19 successfully landed on JRTI.	Success	
294	30 October 2024	OCISLY	Starlink Group 9-9	Falcon 9 first stage B1075.14 successfully landed on OCISLY.	Success	
295	30 October 2024	ASOG	Starlink Group 10-13	Falcon 9 first stage B1078.14 successfully landed on ASOG.	Success	
296	7 November 2024	JRTI	Starlink Group 6-77	Falcon 9 first stage B1085.3 successfully landed on JRTI.	Success	
297	9 November 2024	OCISLY	Starlink Group 9-10	Falcon 9 first stage B1081.11 successfully landed on OCISLY.	Success	
298	11 November 2024	ASOG	Starlink Group 6-69	Falcon 9 first stage B1080.12 successfully landed on ASOG.	Success	
299	14 November 2024	OCISLY	Starlink Group 9-11	Falcon 9 first stage B1082.8 successfully landed on OCISLY.	Success	
300	14 November 2024	JRTI	Starlink Group 6-68	Falcon 9 first stage B1076.18 successfully landed on JRTI.	Success	
301	17 November 2024	ASOG	Optus-X/TD7	Falcon 9 first stage B1077.16 successfully landed on ASOG.	Success	
302	18 November 2024	OCISLY	Starlink Group 9-12	Falcon 9 first stage B1071.20 successfully landed on OCISLY.	Success	
303	18 November 2024	JRTI	GSAT-20 (GSAT-N2)	Falcon 9 first stage B1073.19 successfully landed on JRTI.	Success	
304	21 November 2024	ASOG	Starlink Group 6-66	Falcon 9 first stage B1069.20 successfully landed on ASOG.	Success	
305	24 November 2024	OCISLY	Starlink Group 9-13	Falcon 9 first stage B1075.15 successfully landed on OCISLY.	Success	
306	25 November 2024	JRTI	Starlink Group 12-1	Falcon 9 first stage B1080.13 successfully landed on JRTI.	Success	
307	27 November 2024	ASOG	Starlink Group 6-76	Falcon 9 first stage B1078.15 successfully landed on ASOG.	Success	
308	30 November 2024	JRTI	Starlink Group 6-65	Falcon 9 first stage B1083.6 successfully landed on JRTI.	Success	
309	30 November 2024	OCISLY	NROL-126	Falcon 9 first stage B1088.1 successfully landed on OCISLY.	Success	
310	4 December 2024	ASOG	Starlink Group 6-70	Falcon 9 first stage B1067.24 successfully landed on ASOG.	Success	
311	5 December 2024	OCISLY	Starlink Group 9-14	Falcon 9 first stage B1081.12 successfully landed on OCISLY.	Success	
312	5 December 2024	JRTI	SXM-9	Falcon 9 first stage B1076.19 successfully landed on JRTI. 100th booster landing on JRTI.	Success	
313	8 December 2024	ASOG	Starlink Group 12-5	Falcon 9 first stage B1086.2 successfully landed on ASOG.	Success	
314	13 December 2024	OCISLY	Starlink Group 11-2	Falcon 9 first stage B1082.9 successfully landed on OCISLY. 100th droneship landing in 2024, a record.	Success	
315	17 December 2024	ASOG	GPS III-7 (RRT-1)	Falcon 9 first stage B1085.4 successfully landed on ASOG.	Success	
316	17 December 2024	OCISLY	NROL-149	Falcon 9 first stage B1063.22 successfully landed on OCISLY.	Success	
317	17 December 2024	JRTI	O3b mPOWER 7 & 8	Falcon 9 first stage B1090.1 successfully landed on JRTI.	Success	
318	23 December 2024	JRTI	Starlink Group 12-2	Falcon 9 first stage B1080.14 successfully landed on JRTI.	Success	
319	29 December 2024	OCISLY	Starlink Group 11-3	Falcon 9 first stage B1075.16 successfully landed on OCISLY.	Success	
320	29 December 2024	ASOG	Astranis: From One to Many	Falcon 9 first stage B1083.7 successfully landed on ASOG.	Success	
321	31 December 2024	JRTI	Starlink Group 12-6	Falcon 9 first stage B1078.16 successfully landed on JRTI.	Success	
322	4 January 2025	ASOG	Thuraya 4-NGS	Falcon 9 first stage B1073.20 successfully landed on ASOG.	Success	
323	6 January 2025	JRTI	Starlink Group 6-71	Falcon 9 first stage B1077.17 successfully landed on JRTI.	Success	
324	8 January 2025	ASOG	Starlink Group 12-11	Falcon 9 first stage B1086.3 successfully landed on ASOG.	Success	
325	10 January 2025	OCISLY	NROL-153	Falcon 9 first stage B1071.22 successfully landed on OCISLY.	Success	
326	10 January 2025	JRTI	Starlink Group 12-12	Falcon 9 first stage B1067.25 successfully landed on JRTI.	Success	
327	13 January 2025	ASOG	Starlink Group 12-4	Falcon 9 first stage B1080.15 successfully landed on ASOG.	Success	
328	15 January 2025	JRTI	Blue Ghost M1 & Hakuto-R Mission 2	Falcon 9 first stage B1085.5 successfully landed on JRTI.	Success	
329	21 January 2025	ASOG	Starlink Group 13-1	Falcon 9 first stage B1083.8 successfully landed on ASOG.	Success	
330	21 January 2025	OCISLY	Starlink Group 11-8	Falcon 9 first stage B1082.10 successfully landed on OCISLY.	Success	
331	24 January 2025	OCISLY	Starlink Group 11-6	Falcon 9 first stage B1063.23 successfully landed on OCISLY.	Success	
332	27 January 2025	ASOG	Starlink Group 12-7	Falcon 9 first stage B1076.20 successfully landed on ASOG.	Success	
333	1 February 2025	OCISLY	Starlink Group 11-4	Falcon 9 first stage B1075.17 successfully landed on OCISLY.	Success	
334	4 February 2025	JRTI	Starlink Group 12-3	Falcon 9 first stage B1069.21 successfully landed on JRTI.	Success	
335	8 February 2025	ASOG	Starlink Group 12-9	Falcon 9 first stage B1078.17 successfully landed on ASOG.	Success	
336	11 February 2025	OCISLY	Starlink Group 11-10	Falcon 9 first stage B1071.23 successfully landed on OCISLY.	Success	
337	11 February 2025	JRTI	Starlink Group 12-18	Falcon 9 first stage B1077.18 successfully landed on JRTI.	Success	
338	15 February 2025	ASOG	Starlink Group 12-8	Falcon 9 first stage B1067.26 successfully landed on ASOG.	Success	
339	18 February 2025	JRTI	Starlink Group 10-12	Falcon 9 first stage B1080.16 successfully landed on JRTI.	Success	
340	21 February 2025	ASOG	Starlink Group 12-14	Falcon 9 first stage B1076.21 successfully landed on ASOG.	Success	
341	23 February 2025	OCISLY	Starlink Group 15-1	Falcon 9 first stage B1082.11 successfully landed on OCISLY.	Success	
342	27 February 2025	ASOG	IM-2 Nova-C Lunar Lander	Falcon 9 first stage B1083.9 successfully landed on ASOG. 100th booster landing on ASOG.	Success	
343	27 February 2025	JRTI	Starlink Group 12-13	Falcon 9 first stage B1092.1 successfully landed on JRTI.	Success	
344	3 March 2025	JRTI	Starlink Group 12-20	Falcon 9 first stage B1086.5 initially successfully landed on JRTI. Following the successful landing, an off-nominal fire in the aft end of the rocket damaged one of the booster's landing legs which resulted in it tipping over.	Partial failure	
345	13 March 2025	ASOG	Starlink Group 12-21	Falcon 9 first stage B1069.22 successfully landed on ASOG.	Success	
346	15 March 2025	JRTI	Starlink Group 12-16	Falcon 9 first stage B1078.18 successfully landed on JRTI.	Success	
347	18 March 2025	ASOG	Starlink Group 12-25	Falcon 9 first stage B1077.19 successfully landed on ASOG.	Success	
348	26 March 2025	OCISLY	Starlink Group 11-7	Falcon 9 first stage B1063.24 successfully landed on OCISLY.	Success	
349	31 March 2025	JRTI	Starlink Group 6-80	Falcon 9 first stage B1080.17 successfully landed on JRTI.	Success	
350	1 April 2025	ASOG	Fram2	Falcon 9 first stage B1085.6 successfully landed on ASOG.	Success	
351	4 April 2025	OCISLY	Starlink Group 11-13	Falcon 9 first stage B1088.5 successfully landed on OCISLY.	Success	
352	6 April 2025	JRTI	Starlink Group 6-72	Falcon 9 first stage B1078.19 successfully landed on JRTI.	Success	
353	7 April 2025	OCISLY	Starlink Group 11-11	Falcon 9 first stage B1093.1 successfully landed on OCISLY.	Success	
354	12 April 2025	OCISLY	NROL-192	Falcon 9 first stage B1071.24 successfully landed on OCISLY.	Success	
355	13 April 2025	ASOG	Starlink Group 12-17	Falcon 9 first stage B1083.10 successfully landed on ASOG.	Success	
356	14 April 2025	JRTI	Starlink Group 6-73	Falcon 9 first stage B1067.27 successfully landed on JRTI.	Success	
357	20 April 2025	OCISLY	NROL-145	Falcon 9 first stage B1082.12 successfully landed on OCISLY.	Success	
358	25 April 2025	ASOG	Starlink Group 6-74	Falcon 9 first stage B1069.23 successfully landed on ASOG.	Success	
359	28 April 2025	JRTI	Starlink Group 12-23	Falcon 9 first stage B1077.20 successfully landed on JRTI.	Success	
360	28 April 2025	OCISLY	Starlink Group 11-9	Falcon 9 first stage B1063.25 successfully landed on OCISLY.	Success	
361	29 April 2025	ASOG	Starlink Group 12-10	Falcon 9 first stage B1094.1 successfully landed on ASOG.	Success	
362	2 May 2025	JRTI	Starlink Group 6-75	Falcon 9 first stage B1080.18 successfully landed on JRTI.	Success	
363	4 May 2025	ASOG	Starlink Group 6-84	Falcon 9 first stage B1078.20 successfully landed on ASOG.	Success	
364	7 May 2025	JRTI	Starlink Group 6-93	Falcon 9 first stage B1085.7 successfully landed on JRTI.	Success	
365	10 May 2025	OCISLY	Starlink Group 15-3	Falcon 9 first stage B1081.14 successfully landed on OCISLY.	Success	
366	10 May 2025	ASOG	Starlink Group 6-91	Falcon 9 first stage B1083.11 successfully landed on ASOG.	Success	
367	13 May 2025	OCISLY	Starlink Group 15-4	Falcon 9 first stage B1088.6 successfully landed on OCISLY.	Success	
368	13 May 2025	JRTI	Starlink Group 6-83	Falcon 9 first stage B1067.28 successfully landed on JRTI.	Success	
369	14 May 2025	ASOG	Starlink Group 6-67	Falcon 9 first stage B1090.4 successfully landed on ASOG.	Success	
370	16 May 2025	OCISLY	Starlink Group 15-5	Falcon 9 first stage B1093.2 successfully landed on OCISLY.	Success	
371	21 May 2025	JRTI	Starlink Group 12-15	Falcon 9 first stage B1095.1 successfully landed on JRTI.	Success	
372	23 May 2025	OCISLY	Starlink Group 11-16	Falcon 9 first stage B1075.18 successfully landed on OCISLY.	Success	
373	24 May 2025	ASOG	Starlink Group 12-22	Falcon 9 first stage B1069.24 successfully landed on ASOG.	Success	
374	27 May 2025	OCISLY	Starlink Group 17-1	Falcon 9 first stage B1082.13 successfully landed on OCISLY.	Success	
375	28 May 2025	JRTI	Starlink Group 10-32	Falcon 9 first stage B1080.19 successfully landed on JRTI.	Success	
376	30 May 2025	ASOG	GPS III-8	Falcon 9 first stage B1092.4 successfully landed on ASOG.	Success	
377	31 May 2025	OCISLY	Starlink Group 11-18	Falcon 9 first stage B1071.25 successfully landed on OCISLY.	Success	
378	3 June 2025	JRTI	Starlink Group 12-19	Falcon 9 first stage B1077.21 successfully landed on JRTI.	Success	
379	4 June 2025	OCISLY	Starlink Group 11-22	Falcon 9 first stage B1063.26 successfully landed on OCISLY.	Success	
380	7 June 2025	ASOG	SXM-10	Falcon 9 first stage B1085.8 successfully landed on ASOG.	Success	
381	8 June 2025	OCISLY	Starlink Group 15-8	Falcon 9 first stage B1088.7 successfully landed on OCISLY.	Success	
382	10 June 2025	JRTI	Starlink Group 12-24	Falcon 9 first stage B1083.12 successfully landed on JRTI.	Success	
383	13 June 2025	OCISLY	Starlink Group 15-6	Falcon 9 first stage B1081.15 successfully landed on OCISLY.	Success	
384	13 June 2025	ASOG	Starlink Group 12-26	Falcon 9 first stage B1078.21 successfully landed on ASOG.	Success	
385	17 June 2025	OCISLY	Starlink Group 15-9	Falcon 9 first stage B1093.3 successfully landed on OCISLY.	Success	
386	18 June 2025	JRTI	Starlink Group 10-18	Falcon 9 first stage B1090.5 successfully landed on JRTI.	Success	
387	23 June 2025	ASOG	Starlink Group 10-23	Falcon 9 first stage B1069.25 successfully landed on ASOG.	Success	
388	23 June 2025	OCISLY	Transporter 14	Falcon 9 first stage B1071.26 successfully landed on OCISLY.	Success	
389	25 June 2025	JRTI	Starlink Group 10-16	Falcon 9 first stage B1080.20 successfully landed on JRTI.	Success	
390	28 June 2025	ASOG	Starlink Group 10-34	Falcon 9 first stage B1092.5 successfully landed on ASOG.	Success	
391	28 June 2025	OCISLY	Starlink Group 15-7	Falcon 9 first stage B1088.8 successfully landed on OCISLY. Fastest turnaround for barge from preceding landed booster arrival onshore to next launch (5 days).	Success	
392	1 July 2025	JRTI	MTG-S1 / Sentinel-4A	Falcon 9 first stage B1085.9 successfully landed on JRTI.	Success	
393	2 July 2025	ASOG	Starlink Group 10-25	Falcon 9 first stage B1067.29 successfully landed on ASOG.	Success	
394	8 July 2025	ASOG	Starlink Group 10-28	Falcon 9 first stage B1077.22 successfully landed on ASOG.	Success	
395	13 July 2025	JRTI	Dror-1 "Commercial GTO 1"	Falcon 9 first stage B1083.13 successfully landed on JRTI.	Success	
396	16 July 2025	OCISLY	Starlink Group 15-2	Falcon 9 first stage B1093.4 successfully landed on OCISLY.	Success	
397	16 July 2025	ASOG	LeoSat (KF-01)	Falcon 9 first stage B1096.1 successfully landed on ASOG.	Success	
398	19 July 2025	OCISLY	Starlink Group 17-3	Falcon 9 first stage B1082.14 successfully landed on OCISLY.	Success	
399	22 July 2025	JRTI	O3b mPOWER 9 & 10	Falcon 9 first stage B1090.6 successfully landed on JRTI.	Success	
400	26 July 2025	ASOG	Starlink Group 10-26	Falcon 9 first stage B1078.22 successfully landed on ASOG.	Success	
401	27 July 2025	OCISLY	Starlink Group 17-2	Falcon 9 first stage B1075.19 successfully landed on OCISLY.	Success	
402	30 July 2025	JRTI	Starlink Group 10-29	Falcon 9 first stage B1069.26 successfully landed on JRTI.	Success	
403	31 July 2025	OCISLY	Starlink Group 13-4	Falcon 9 first stage B1071.27 successfully landed on OCISLY.	Success	
404	4 August 2025	JRTI	Starlink Group 10-30	Falcon 9 first stage B1080.21 successfully landed on JRTI.	Success	
405	11 August 2025	ASOG	LeoSat (KF-02)	Falcon 9 first stage B1091.1 successfully landed on ASOG. First converted Falcon Heavy center core type booster landing.	Success	
406	14 August 2025	OCISLY	Starlink Group 17-4	Falcon 9 first stage B1093.5 successfully landed on OCISLY.	Success	
407	14 August 2025	JRTI	Starlink Group 10-20	Falcon 9 first stage B1085.10 successfully landed on JRTI.	Success	
408	18 August 2025	OCISLY	Starlink Group 17-5	Falcon 9 first stage B1088.9 successfully landed on OCISLY.	Success	
409	22 August 2025	OCISLY	Starlink Group 17-6	Falcon 9 first stage B1081.17 successfully landed on OCISLY.	Success	
410	24 August 2025	ASOG	SpaceX CRS-33	Falcon 9 first stage B1090.7 successfully landed on ASOG.	Success	
411	27 August 2025	JRTI	Starlink Group 10-56	Falcon 9 first stage B1095.2 successfully landed on JRTI. 400th droneship landing.	Success	
412	28 August 2025	ASOG	Starlink Group 10-11	Falcon 9 first stage B1067.30 successfully landed on ASOG.	Success	
413	30 August 2025	OCISLY	Starlink Group 17-7	Falcon 9 first stage B1082.15 successfully landed on OCISLY.	Success	
414	31 August 2025	JRTI	Starlink Group 10-14	Falcon 9 first stage B1077.23 successfully landed on JRTI.	Success	
415	3 September 2025	OCISLY	Starlink Group 17-8	Falcon 9 first stage B1097.1 successfully landed on OCISLY.	Success	
416	3 September 2025	ASOG	Starlink Group 10-22	Falcon 9 first stage B1083.14 successfully landed on ASOG.	Success	
417	5 September 2025	JRTI	Starlink Group 10-57	Falcon 9 first stage B1069.27 successfully landed on JRTI.	Success	
418	6 September 2025	OCISLY	Starlink Group 17-9	Falcon 9 first stage B1075.20 successfully landed on OCISLY. 150th booster landing on OCISLY.	Success	
419	10 September 2025	OCISLY	SDA Tranche 1 Transport Layer B	Falcon 9 first stage B1093.6 successfully landed on OCISLY.	Success	
420	12 September 2025	ASOG	Nusantara Lima	Falcon 9 first stage B1078.23 successfully landed on ASOG.	Success	
421	13 September 2025	OCISLY	Starlink Group 17-10	Falcon 9 first stage B1071.28 successfully landed on OCISLY.	Success	
422	18 September 2025	JRTI	Starlink Group 10-61	Falcon 9 first stage B1092.7 successfully landed on JRTI.	Success	
423	19 September 2025	OCISLY	Starlink Group 17-12	Falcon 9 first stage B1088.10 successfully landed on OCISLY.	Success	
424	21 September 2025	ASOG	Starlink Group 10-27	Falcon 9 first stage B1085.11 successfully landed on ASOG.	Success	
425	24 September 2025	JRTI	IMAP	Falcon 9 first stage B1096.2 successfully landed on JRTI.	Success	
426	25 September 2025	ASOG	Starlink Group 10-15	Falcon 9 first stage B1080.22 successfully landed on ASOG.	Success	
427	26 September 2025	OCISLY	Starlink Group 17-11	Falcon 9 first stage B1082.16 successfully landed on OCISLY.	Success	
428	29 September 2025	OCISLY	Starlink Group 11-20	Falcon 9 first stage B1063.28 successfully landed on OCISLY.	Success	
429	3 October 2025	OCISLY	Starlink Group 11-39	Falcon 9 first stage B1097.2 successfully landed on OCISLY.	Success	
430	7 October 2025	ASOG	Starlink Group 10-59	Falcon 9 first stage B1090.8 successfully landed on ASOG.	Success	
431	8 October 2025	OCISLY	Starlink Group 11-17	Falcon 9 first stage B1071.29 successfully landed on OCISLY.	Success	
432	14 October 2025	ASOG	LeoSat (KF-03)	Falcon 9 first stage B1091.2 successfully landed on ASOG.	Success	
433	15 October 2025	OCISLY	SDA Tranche 1 Transport Layer C	Falcon 9 first stage B1093.7 successfully landed on OCISLY.	Success	
434	16 October 2025	JRTI	Starlink Group 10-52	Falcon 9 first stage B1095.3 successfully landed on JRTI.	Success	
435	19 October 2025	ASOG	Starlink Group 10-17	Falcon 9 first stage B1067.31 successfully landed on ASOG.	Success	
436	19 October 2025	OCISLY	Starlink Group 11-19	Falcon 9 first stage B1088.11 successfully landed on OCISLY.	Success	
437	22 October 2025	OCISLY	Starlink Group 11-5	Falcon 9 first stage B1075.21 successfully landed on OCISLY.	Success	
438	25 October 2025	OCISLY	Starlink Group 11-12	Falcon 9 first stage B1081.19 successfully landed on OCISLY.	Success	
439	26 October 2025	ASOG	Starlink Group 10-21	Falcon 9 first stage B1077.24 successfully landed on ASOG.	Success	
440	28 October 2025	OCISLY	Starlink Group 11-21	Falcon 9 first stage B1082.17 successfully landed on OCISLY.	Success	
441	29 October 2025	JRTI	Starlink Group 10-37	Falcon 9 first stage B1083.15 successfully landed on JRTI.	Success	
442	31 October 2025	OCISLY	Starlink Group 11-23	Falcon 9 first stage B1063.29 successfully landed on OCISLY.	Success	
443	6 November 2025	JRTI	Starlink Group 6-81	Falcon 9 first stage B1094.5 successfully landed on JRTI.	Success	
444	6 November 2025	OCISLY	Starlink Group 11-14	Falcon 9 first stage B1093.8 successfully landed on OCISLY.	Success	
445	9 November 2025	ASOG	Starlink Group 10-51	Falcon 9 first stage B1069.28 successfully landed on ASOG.	Success	
446	11 November 2025	JRTI	Starlink Group 6-87	Falcon 9 first stage B1096.3 successfully landed on JRTI.	Success	
447	15 November 2025	ASOG	Starlink Group 6-89	Falcon 9 first stage B1092.8 successfully landed on ASOG.	Success	
448	15 November 2025	JRTI	Starlink Group 6-85	Falcon 9 first stage B1078.24 successfully landed on JRTI.	Success	
449	19 November 2025	ASOG	Starlink Group 6-94	Falcon 9 first stage B1085.12 successfully landed on ASOG.	Success	
450	21 November 2025	JRTI	Starlink Group 6-78	Falcon 9 first stage B1080.23 successfully landed on JRTI.	Success	
451	22 November 2025	ASOG	Starlink Group 6-79	Falcon 9 first stage B1090.9 successfully landed on ASOG.	Success	
452	23 November 2025	OCISLY	Starlink Group 11-30	Falcon 9 first stage B1100.1 successfully landed on OCISLY.	Success	
453	28 November 2025	OCISLY	Transporter-15	Falcon 9 first stage B1071.30 successfully landed on OCISLY.	Success	
454	1 December 2025	JRTI	Starlink Group 6-86	Falcon 9 first stage B1095.4 successfully landed on JRTI.	Success	
455	2 December 2025	OCISLY	Starlink Group 15-10	Falcon 9 first stage B1081.20 successfully landed on OCISLY.	Success	
456	2 December 2025	ASOG	Starlink Group 6-95	Falcon 9 first stage B1077.25 successfully landed on ASOG.	Success	
457	4 December 2025	OCISLY	Starlink Group 11-25	Falcon 9 first stage B1097.4 successfully landed on OCISLY.	Success	
458	7 December 2025	OCISLY	Starlink Group 11-15	Falcon 9 first stage B1088.12 successfully landed on OCISLY.	Success	
459	8 December 2025	ASOG	Starlink Group 6-92	Falcon 9 first stage B1067.32 successfully landed on ASOG.	Success	
460	10 December 2025	OCISLY	Starlink Group 15-11	Falcon 9 first stage B1082.18 successfully landed on OCISLY.	Success	
461	11 December 2025	JRTI	Starlink Group 6-90	Falcon 9 first stage B1083.16 successfully landed on JRTI.	Success	
462	14 December 2025	OCISLY	Starlink Group 15-12	Falcon 9 first stage B1093.9 successfully landed on OCISLY.	Success	
463	15 December 2025	ASOG	Starlink Group 6-82	Falcon 9 first stage B1092.9 successfully landed on ASOG.	Success	
464	17 December 2025	JRTI	Starlink Group 6-99	Falcon 9 first stage B1094.6 successfully landed on JRTI.	Success	
465	17 December 2025	OCISLY	Starlink Group 15-13	Falcon 9 first stage B1063.30 successfully landed on OCISLY.	Success	
466	4 January 2026	JRTI	Starlink Group 6-88	Falcon 9 first stage B1101.1 successfully landed on JRTI.	Success	
467	9 January 2026	ASOG	Starlink Group 6-96	Falcon 9 first stage B1069.29 successfully landed on ASOG.	Success	
468	12 January 2026	JRTI	Starlink Group 6-97	Falcon 9 first stage B1078.25 successfully landed on JRTI.	Success	
469	14 January 2026	ASOG	Starlink Group 6-98	Falcon 9 first stage B1085.13 successfully landed on ASOG.	Success	
470	18 January 2026	ASOG	Starlink Group 6-100	Falcon 9 first stage B1080.24 successfully landed on ASOG.	Success	
471	22 January 2026	OCISLY	Starlink Group 17-30	Falcon 9 first stage B1093.10 successfully landed on OCISLY.	Success	
472	25 January 2026	OCISLY	Starlink Group 17-20	Falcon 9 first stage B1097.6 successfully landed on OCISLY.	Success	
473	28 January 2026	ASOG	GPS III-9	Falcon 9 first stage B1096.5 successfully landed on ASOG.	Success	
474	29 January 2026	OCISLY	Starlink Group 17-19	Falcon 9 first stage B1082.19 successfully landed on OCISLY.	Success	
475	30 January 2026	JRTI	Starlink Group 6-101	Falcon 9 first stage B1095.5 successfully landed on JRTI.	Success	
476	2 February 2026	OCISLY	Starlink Group 17-32	Falcon 9 first stage B1071.31 successfully landed on OCISLY.	Success	
477	7 February 2026	OCISLY	Starlink Group 17-33	Falcon 9 first stage B1088.13 successfully landed on OCISLY.	Success	
478	11 February 2026	OCISLY	Starlink Group 17-34	Falcon 9 first stage B1100.3 successfully landed on OCISLY.	Success	
479	15 February 2026	OCISLY	Starlink Group 17-13	Falcon 9 first stage B1081.22 successfully landed on OCISLY.	Success	
480	16 February 2026	ASOG	Starlink Group 6-103	Falcon 9 first stage B1090.10 successfully landed on ASOG.	Success	
481	20 February 2026	JRTI	Starlink Group 10-36	Falcon 9 first stage B1077.26 successfully landed on JRTI.	Success	
482	21 February 2026	OCISLY	Starlink Group 17-25	Falcon 9 first stage B1063.31 successfully landed on OCISLY.	Success	
483	22 February 2026	ASOG	Starlink Group 6-104	Falcon 9 first stage B1067.33 successfully landed on ASOG.	Success	
484	24 February 2026	JRTI	Starlink Group 6-110	Falcon 9 first stage B1092.10 successfully landed on JRTI.	Success	
485	25 February 2026	OCISLY	Starlink Group 17-26	Falcon 9 first stage B1093.11 successfully landed on OCISLY.	Success	
486	27 February 2026	ASOG	Starlink Group 6-108	Falcon 9 first stage B1069.30 successfully landed on ASOG.	Success	
487	1 March 2026	OCISLY	Starlink Group 17-23	Falcon 9 first stage B1082.20 successfully landed on OCISLY.	Success	
488	2 March 2026	JRTI	Starlink Group 10-41	Falcon 9 first stage B1078.26 successfully landed on JRTI.	Success	
489	4 March 2026	ASOG	Starlink Group 10-40	Falcon 9 first stage B1080.25 successfully landed on ASOG.	Success	
490	8 March 2026	OCISLY	Starlink Group 17-18	Falcon 9 first stage B1097.7 successfully landed on OCISLY.	Success	
491	10 March 2026	ASOG	EchoStar XXV	Falcon 9 first stage B1085.14 successfully landed on ASOG.	Success	
492	13 March 2026	OCISLY	Starlink Group 17-31	Falcon 9 first stage B1071.32 successfully landed on OCISLY.	Success	
493	14 March 2026	JRTI	Starlink Group 10-48	Falcon 9 first stage B1095.6 successfully landed on JRTI.	Success	
494	17 March 2026	OCISLY	Starlink Group 17-24	Falcon 9 first stage B1088.14 successfully landed on OCISLY.	Success	
495	17 March 2026	ASOG	Starlink Group 10-46	Falcon 9 first stage B1090.11 successfully landed on ASOG.	Success	
496	19 March 2026	JRTI	Starlink Group 10-33	Falcon 9 first stage B1077.27 successfully landed on JRTI.	Success	
497	20 March 2026	OCISLY	Starlink Group 17-15	Falcon 9 first stage B1100.4 successfully landed on OCISLY.	Success	
498	22 March 2026	ASOG	Starlink Group 10-62	Falcon 9 first stage B1078.27 successfully landed on ASOG.	Success	
499	26 March 2026	OCISLY	Starlink Group 17-17	Falcon 9 first stage B1081.23 successfully landed on OCISLY.	Success	
500	30 March 2026	OCISLY	Transporter-16	Falcon 9 first stage B1093.12 successfully landed on OCISLY.	Success	
501	30 March 2026	JRTI	Starlink Group 10-44	Falcon 9 first stage B1067.34 successfully landed on JRTI.	Success	
502	2 April 2026	ASOG	Starlink Group 10-58	Falcon 9 first stage B1085.15 successfully landed on ASOG.	Success	
503	7 April 2026	OCISLY	Starlink Group 17-35	Falcon 9 first stage B1103.1 successfully landed on OCISLY.	Success	
504	11 April 2026	OCISLY	Starlink Group 17-21	Falcon 9 first stage B1063.32 successfully landed on OCISLY.	Success	
505	14 April 2026	JRTI	Starlink Group 10-24	Falcon 9 first stage B1080.26 successfully landed on JRTI.	Success	
506	15 April 2026	OCISLY	Starlink Group 17-27	Falcon 9 first stage B1082.21 successfully landed on OCISLY.	Success	
507	19 April 2026	OCISLY	Starlink Group 17-22	Falcon 9 first stage B1097.8 successfully landed on OCISLY.	Success	
508	21 April 2026	JRTI	GPS III-10	Falcon 9 first stage B1095.7 successfully landed on JRTI. Final planned landing on Just Read The Instructions, which will be dedicated to supporting Starship operations.	Success	
509	23 April 2026	OCISLY	Starlink Group 17-14	Falcon 9 first stage B1100.5 successfully landed on OCISLY.	Success	
510	26 April 2026	OCISLY	Starlink Group 17-16	Falcon 9 first stage B1088.15 successfully landed on OCISLY.	Success	
511	30 April 2026	OCISLY	Starlink Group 17-36	Falcon 9 first stage B1093.13 successfully landed on OCISLY.	Success	
512	1 May 2026	ASOG	Starlink Group 10-38	Falcon 9 first stage B1069.31 successfully landed on ASOG.	Success	
513	6 May 2026	OCISLY	Starlink Group 17-29	Falcon 9 first stage B1081.24 successfully landed on OCISLY.	Success	
514	12 May 2026	OCISLY	NROL-172	Falcon 9 first stage B1097.9 successfully landed on OCISLY.	Success	
515	20 May 2026	OCISLY	Starlink Group 17-42	Falcon 9 first stage B1103.2 successfully landed on OCISLY.	Success	
516	21 May 2026	ASOG	Starlink Group 10-31	Falcon 9 first stage B1077.28 successfully landed on ASOG.	Success	
517	25 May 2026	ASOG	Starlink Group 10-47	Falcon 9 first stage B1078.28 successfully landed on ASOG.	Success	
518	26 May 2026	OCISLY	Starlink Group 17-37	Falcon 9 first stage B1100.6 successfully landed on OCISLY.	Success	
519	29 May 2026	ASOG	Starlink Group 10-53	Falcon 9 first stage B1085.16 successfully landed on ASOG.	Success	
520	30 May 2026	OCISLY	Starlink Group 17-41	Falcon 9 first stage B1082.22 successfully landed on OCISLY.	Success	
521	3 June 2026	OCISLY	Starlink Group 17-47	Falcon 9 first stage B1088.16 successfully landed on OCISLY.	Success	
522	4 June 2026	ASOG	Starlink Group 10-43	Falcon 9 first stage B1090.12 successfully landed on ASOG.	Success	
523	7 June 2026	OCISLY	Starlink Group 17-43	Falcon 9 first stage B1097.10 successfully landed on OCISLY.	Success	
524	8 June 2026	ASOG	Starlink Group 10-35	Falcon 9 first stage B1067.35 successfully landed on ASOG.	Success	
525	11 June 2026	OCISLY	Starlink Group 17-44	Falcon 9 first stage B1071.34 successfully landed on OCISLY.	Success	
526	12 June 2026	ASOG	Starlink Group 10-54	Falcon 9 first stage B1080.27 successfully landed on ASOG.	Success	
527	15 June 2026	OCISLY	Starlink Group 17-54	Falcon 9 first stage B1093.14 successfully landed on OCISLY.	Success	
528	17 June 2026	ASOG	BlueBird 8 to 10	Falcon 9 first stage B1077.29 successfully landed on ASOG.	Success	
529	21 June 2026	OCISLY	Starlink Group 17-28	Falcon 9 first stage B1063.33 successfully landed on OCISLY.	Success	
530	23 June 2026	ASOG	Starfall Demo	Falcon 9 first stage B1078.29 successfully landed on ASOG.	Success	
531	25 June 2026	OCISLY	Starlink Group 17-45	Falcon 9 first stage B1081.25 successfully landed on OCISLY.	Success	
532	28 June 2026	OCISLY	Starlink Group 17-40	Falcon 9 first stage B1088.17 successfully landed on OCISLY.	Success	
533	29 June 2026	ASOG	SXM-11	Falcon 9 first stage B1085.17 successfully landed on ASOG.	Success	
534	2 July 2026	OCISLY	Starlink Group 17-46	Falcon 9 first stage B1100.7 successfully landed on OCISLY.	Success	
535	5 July 2026	ASOG	Starlink Group 10-50	Falcon 9 first stage B1090.13 successfully landed on ASOG.	Success	
536	7 July 2026	OCISLY	Transporter-17	Falcon 9 first stage B1097.11 successfully landed on OCISLY.	Success	
537	9 July 2026	ASOG	Starlink Group 10-42	Falcon 9 first stage B1067.36 successfully landed on ASOG.	Success	
538	11 July 2026	OCISLY	Starlink Group 17-48	Falcon 9 first stage B1071.35 successfully landed on OCISLY.	Success	
539	14 July 2026	OCISLY	Starlink Group 15-14	Falcon 9 first stage B1093.15 successfully landed on OCISLY.	Success	
540	14 July 2026	ASOG	Starlink Group 10-45	Falcon 9 first stage B1080.28 successfully landed on ASOG.	Success	
541	16 July 2026	OCISLY	SDA Tranche 1 Transport Layer E	Falcon 9 first stage B1103.4 successfully landed on OCISLY.	Success	
542	21 July 2026	OCISLY	Starlink Group 17-39	Falcon 9 first stage B1082.23 successfully landed on OCISLY.	Success	
543	25 July 2026	OCISLY	Starlink Group 17-51	Falcon 9 first stage B1100.8 successfully landed on OCISLY.	Success	
544	1 August 2026	OCISLY	Starlink Group 17-52	Falcon 9 first stage B1081.26 successfully landed on OCISLY.	Success	
545	4 August 2026	OCISLY	Starlink Group 17-53	Falcon 9 first stage B1063.34 successfully landed on OCISLY.	Success	
546	5 August 2026	ASOG	BlueBird 11 to 13	Falcon 9 first stage B1077.30 successfully landed on ASOG.	Success	
547	8 August 2026	OCISLY	Starlink Group 17-38	Falcon 9 first stage B1093.16 successfully landed on OCISLY.	Success	
548	11 August 2026	ASOG	Starlink Group 10-19	Falcon 9 first stage B1085.18 successfully landed on ASOG.	Success	
549	12 August 2026	OCISLY	Starlink Group 17-49	Falcon 9 first stage B1103.5 successfully landed on OCISLY.	Success	
550	16 August 2026	OCISLY	USSF-366	Falcon 9 first stage B1088.18 successfully landed on OCISLY.	Success	
551	19 August 2026	OCISLY	Starlink Group 17-50	Falcon 9 first stage B1097.12 successfully landed on OCISLY.	Success	
552	21 August 2026	ASOG	Starlink Group 10-39	Falcon 9 first stage B1078.30 successfully landed on ASOG.	Success	
553	22 August 2026	OCISLY	Starlink Group 15-20	Falcon 9 first stage B1100.9 successfully landed on OCISLY.	Success	
554	25 August 2026	ASOG	Starlink Group 10-49	Falcon 9 first stage B1067.37 successfully landed on ASOG.	Success	
555	26 August 2026	OCISLY	Starlink Group 15-22	Falcon 9 first stage B1082.24 successfully landed on OCISLY.	Success	
556	2 September 2026	OCISLY	Starlink Group 15-23	Falcon 9 first stage B1063.35 successfully landed on OCISLY.	Success	
557	6 September 2026	OCISLY	Starlink Group 15-24	Falcon 9 first stage B1088.19 successfully landed on OCISLY.	Success	
558	10 September 2026	OCISLY	USSF-153	Falcon 9 first stage B1081.27 successfully landed on OCISLY.	Success	
559	13 September 2026	ASOG	O3b mPOWER 11, 12 & 13	Falcon 9 first stage B1080.29 successfully landed on ASOG.	Success	
560	17 September 2026	OCISLY	USSF-259	Falcon 9 first stage B1097.13 successfully landed on OCISLY.	Success	
561	20 September 2026	OCISLY	Starlink Group 15-27	Falcon 9 first stage B1093.17 successfully landed on OCISLY.	Success	
562	26 September 2026	OCISLY	USSF-385	Falcon 9 first stage B1100.10 successfully landed on OCISLY.	Success	
563	13 October 2026	OCISLY	Starlink Group 15-25	Falcon 9 first stage B1088.20 successfully landed on OCISLY.	Success	
564	16 October 2026	OCISLY	USSF-481	Falcon 9 first stage B1081.28 successfully landed on OCISLY.	Success	
565	20 October 2026	ASOG	Bandwagon-5	Falcon 9 first stage B1085.19 successfully landed on ASOG.	Success	
566	23 October 2026	OCISLY	Starlink Group 15-15	Falcon 9 first stage B1063.36 successfully landed on OCISLY.	Success	
567	27 October 2026	OCISLY	Starlink Group 15-16	Falcon 9 first stage B1082.26 successfully landed on OCISLY.	Success	
568	31 October 2026	OCISLY	Starlink Group 15-18	Falcon 9 first stage B1093.18 successfully landed on OCISLY.	Success	
569	7 November 2026	OCISLY	USSF-432	Falcon 9 first stage B1095.8 successfully landed on OCISLY.	Success	
570	12 November 2026	OCISLY	USSF-627	Falcon 9 first stage B1103.7 successfully landed on OCISLY.	Success	
571	21 November 2026	OCISLY	USSF-317	Falcon 9 first stage B1100.11 successfully landed on OCISLY.	Success	

== See also ==
- SpaceX landing zone
- List of Falcon 9 and Falcon Heavy launches
- Jacklyn (ship), Blue Origin landing platform vessel
- SpaceX fairing recovery program
- NASA recovery ship
- Reusable launch vehicle
- Vertical Take-off, Vertical Landing
- Sea Launch
