= Landing pad =

Landing pad may refer to:

- Helipad, a landing area for helicopters
- Rocket landing pad (disambiguation)

== See also ==
- Landing zone (disambiguation)
- Landing (disambiguation)
