= SpaceX landing zone =

SpaceX routinely lands boosters of its Falcon 9 and Falcon Heavy rockets, either on a landing zone on the ground or on a drone ship. SpaceX landing zones include:

- Landing Zones 1 and 2, former landing facilities at Cape Canaveral Space Force Station, Florida, US
- Landing Zone 4 at Vandenberg Space Launch Complex 4, California, US
- Kennedy Space Center Launch Complex 39A, Florida, US
- Landing Zone 40 at Cape Canaveral Space Launch Complex 40, Florida, US
- Vandenberg Space Launch Complex 6, California, US
- Autonomous spaceport drone ship

== See also ==
- SpaceX facilities
- Floating launch vehicle operations platform
- Landing zone
