= Koreasat 5A =

South Korean satellite launched in 2017

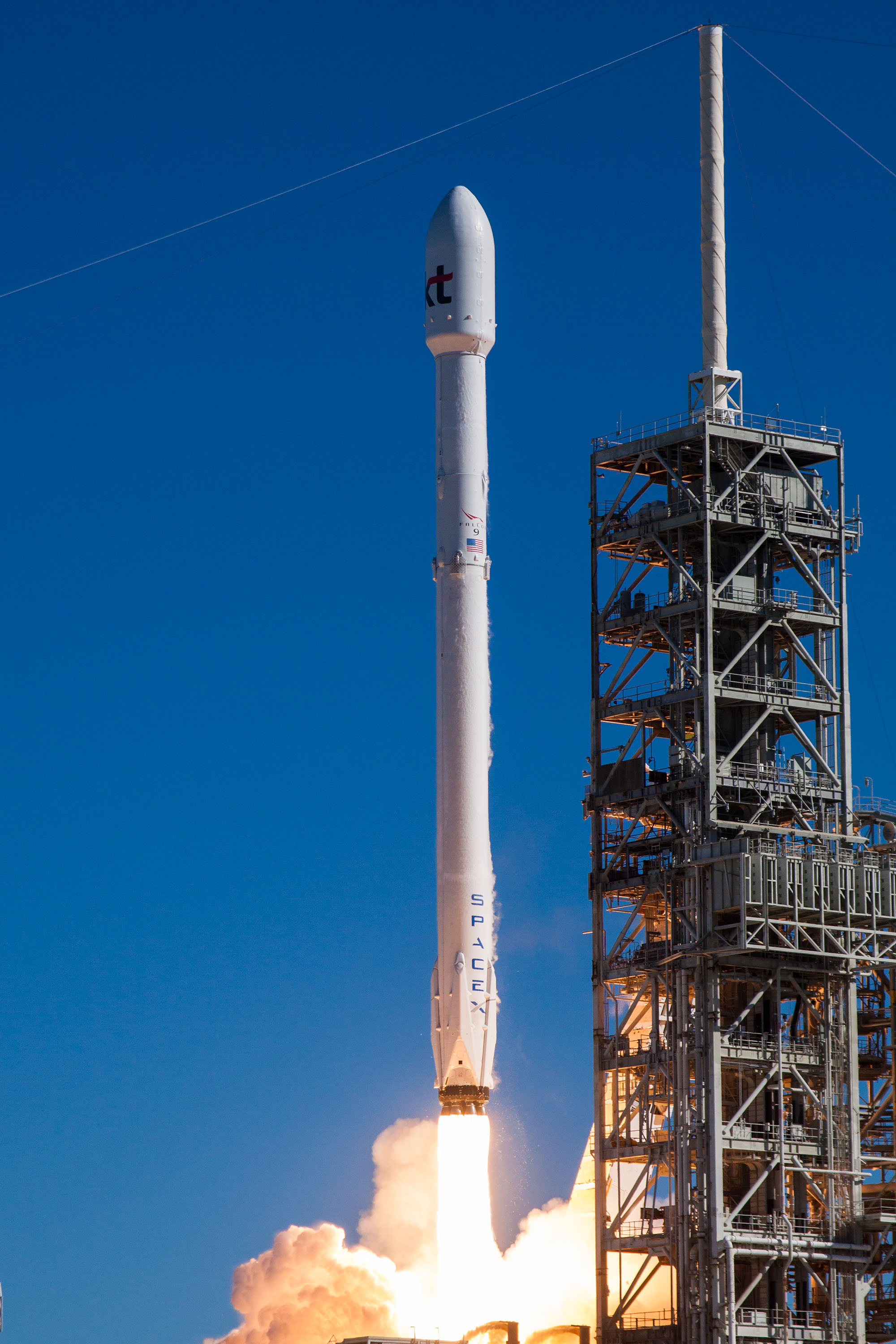
- Falcon 9 launch from Kennedy Space Center LC-39A, carrying Koreasat 5A
- Mission type: Communications Satellite
- Operator: KT SAT
- COSPAR ID: 2017-067A
- SATCAT no.: 42984

Spacecraft properties
- Bus: Spacebus-4000B2
- Manufacturer: Thales Alenia Space

Start of mission
- Launch date: 19:34, October 27, 2017 (UTC) UTC
- Rocket: Falcon 9 Block 4
- Launch site: Kennedy Space Center LC-39A

Orbital parameters
- Reference system: Geocentric
- Regime: Geostationary (GEO)
- Longitude: 113° East

Koreasat 5A is a South Korean communications satellite operated by KT SAT, a subsidiary of KT Corporation. On 30 October 2017, it was launched on Falcon 9 Block 4 rocket.

Satellite name	Koresat-5A
Operator	KT SAT
Type	GEO stationary satellite
Orbit slot	113°E
Coverage	Indochina, Korea, South Asia, Indian Ocean
