= Landing zone =

Area where aircraft can land; especially for vertical landings

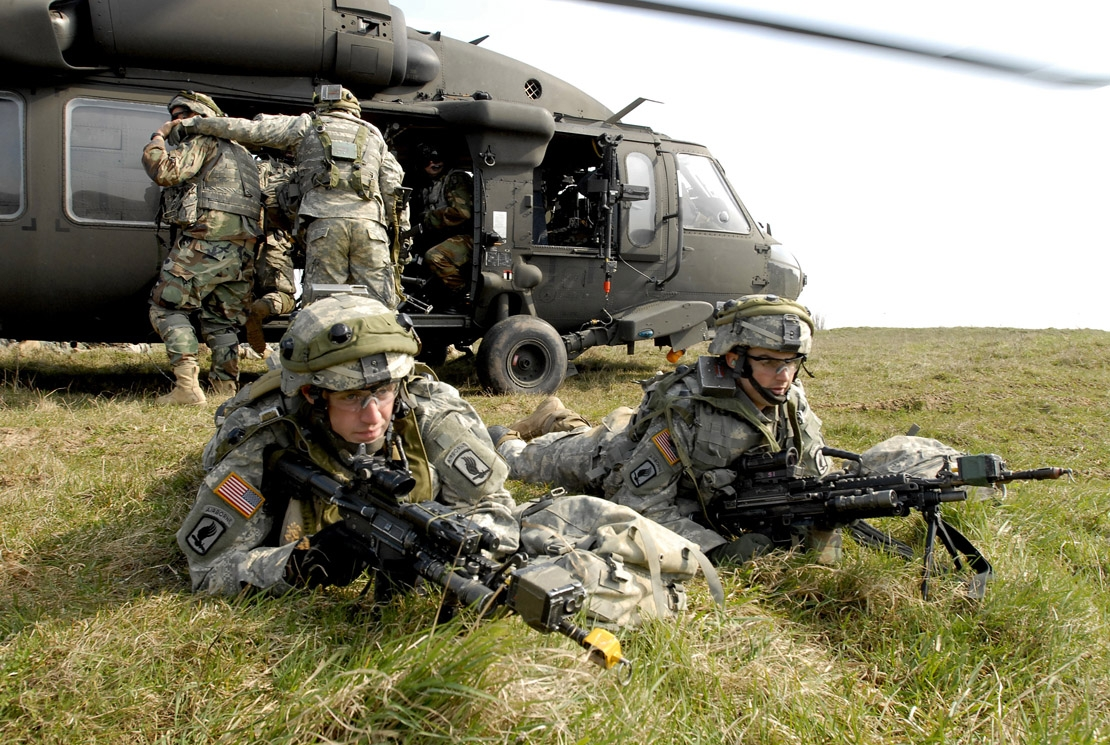
U.S. Army troops practice securing a landing zone

In military terminology, a landing zone (LZ) is an area where aircraft can land.

In the United States military, a landing zone is the actual point where aircraft, especially helicopters, land (equivalent to the commonwealth landing point).

In commonwealth militaries, a landing zone is the cartographic (numeric) zone in which the landing is going to take place (e.g., a valley). The landing area is the area in which the landing is going to take place (e.g., the field where the aircraft are to land). The landing point is the actual point on which aircraft are going to land (e.g., a point of the field). Each aircraft has a different landing point.

== Identifying an LZ from the air ==
Landing areas are most commonly marked by colored smoke. The standard procedure is for troops already on the ground at the landing area to "pop smoke" (set off a smoke grenade). The aircraft pilot(s) radio back when the smoke is spotted and what color smoke they see. Troops on the ground then respond with what color the smoke should be. Smoke of a different color can mean that the landing area has been discovered and compromised by the enemy, and the pilot will usually have the authority to cancel any landing.

== Vietnam War ==
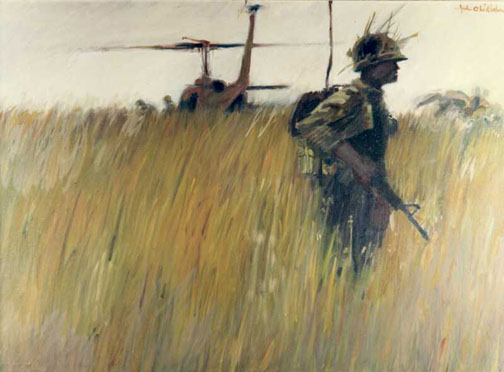
LANDING ZONE by John O. Wehrle, U. S. Army Vietnam Combat Artists Program Team I, (CAT I 1966). Courtesy National Museum of the U. S. Army.

The United States used LZs to a greater extent in the Vietnam War than in other wars because of the widespread use of helicopters, which provided increased mobility and rapid transportation of forces. LZs could be temporary, being little more than a clearing in the jungle or a clearing made using special munitions, such as commando vault bombs, which cleared everything in a diameter of 150 feet. Other LZs were permanent or semi-permanent built with more deliberate construction. The Battle of Ia Drang in 1965 centered on two LZs.

== Afghanistan ==
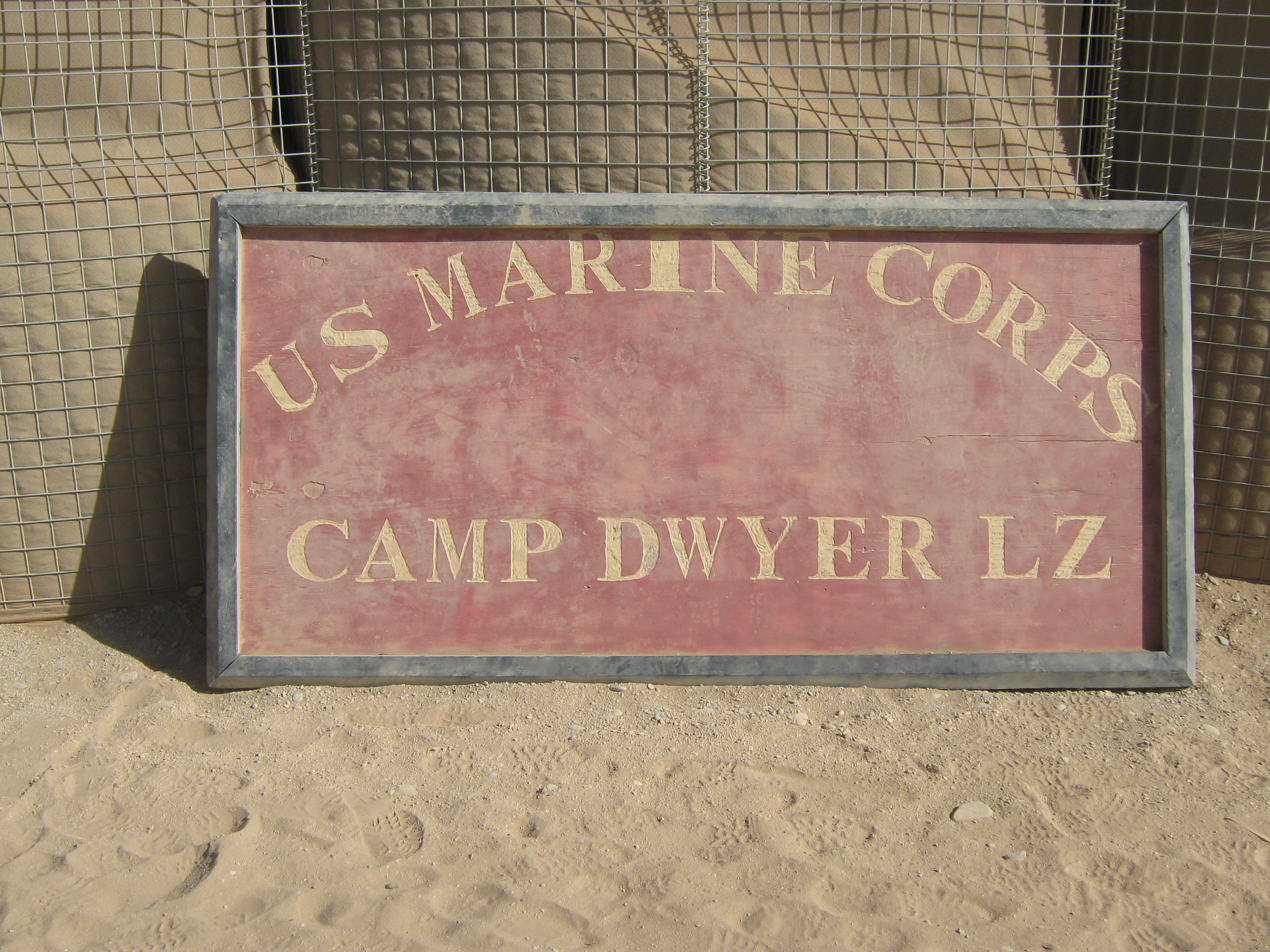
LZ sign at Camp Dwyer in Afghanistan

The Soviet Union and Coalition forces also used LZs extensively because of the rugged terrain and distances traveled during wars in Afghanistan.

== Temporary LZs ==
LZs operated by the First Cavalry Division, especially in War Zone C in 1968 and 1969, were often established for specific operations or to draw out the North Vietnamese Army (NVA) units thought to be operating in that area. When a sizable enemy force was located, it could be decisively engaged, forced to move on, or if determined to be elsewhere, the LZ would be abandoned for a new location after a successful mission.

LZ Carolyn was one such LZ; first established as a special forces outpost near Cambodia at Prek Lok in Tay Ninh province, it was abandoned and later occupied by mechanized elements of the 1st Infantry Division. LZ Carolyn was situated in a location especially irritating to the NVA, astride one of the main access routes for the Viet Cong (VC) & NVA to reach Saigon, its presence was a constant problem for them. In April 1969, the US Army's 2/8 Cavalry reopened the LZ and began operations in its vicinity, and the hornet's nest had been prodded. Incoming rocket and mortar rounds fired by the VC/NVA were a daily and nightly occurrence, and skirmishes near the LZ were common. Then on the night of May 6, 1969, an entire NVA regiment (95C) attacked the LZ, which was defended by 300 US Army troops. As described by Tom Lane:

In the early morning darkness of 6 May, the NVA retaliated with an intensive rocket and mortar barrage, followed by a massive 95th Regiment pincer grand assault against 2 sides of the base an hour later. LZ Carolyn's garrison was reduced by the absence of several line companies on patrol, and the withering defensive fires of the battalion's COMPANY C and E were unable to prevent the onrushing battalions from storming through the wire and into the LZ from both directions.

Six perimeter bunkers were overrun, one of the medium howitzers was captured, and the enemy threatened to slice through the center of the base.

The Americans counterattacked with all available personnel, the officers involved being killed at the head of their troops. Artillerymen, supply and signal personnel, and engineers fought and died as emergency infantry reserves. The US counterattacks were hurled against both enemy penetrations, but the most violent fighting occurred on the northern side, where a seesaw battle raged for possession of the 155mm howitzer position. During the course of the battle, this weapon exchanged hands 3 times in hand-to-hand fighting decided at close range with rifles and E-tools (entrenching tools, or shovels).

Overhead, rocket-firing AH1G Cobra helicopters rolled in, ignoring heavy flak, and blasted the NVA with rockets and miniguns. Air Force AC47 SPOOKY and AC119 SHADOW aircraft, supported by fighter-bombers, were employed against the numerous enemy antiaircraft weapons ringing the perimeter.

Controlled and uncontrolled fires were raging everywhere, and it seemed that the LZ was ablaze throughout its entire length. Waves of NVA infantry charging into the southern lines were met by defending troops who took advantage of the aviation gasoline storage area. The Americans shot holes into the fuel drums and ignited the flowing rivers of gas to create a flaming barrier, which effectively blocked further enemy penetration. In the LZ's opposite sector, a medium howitzer gun pit received 3 direct hits, which touched off a fire in its powder bunker, yet the crew calmly stood by its weapon and employed it throughout the night.

Both of the 105mm howitzer ammunition points were detonated by enemy fire at around 0330, and shrapnel from more than 600 disintegrating rounds in the 2 dumps sprayed the entire LZ for more than four hours. LZ Carolyn appeared threatened with total destruction as the thundering conflagration tossed detonating artillery projectiles to shower men and equipment with flying rounds and burning shell fragments.

The defending artillerymen and mortar crews fought in desperation, heightened by the loss of communications between most weapons and their fire direction centers (FDC). The initial enemy barrage destroyed communication from the 155mm gun sections to their FDC, forcing crews to individually engage targets on their own volition by leveling tubes full of BEE HIVE or HE charges. When telephone lines from the mortar tubes to their FDC were severed, the direction personnel switched to a bullhorn to relay fire commands across the deafening noise of the battlefield. The battalion mortar platoon's four tubes fired 1500 rounds, ranging from critical illumination to searing WP. In all cases, effective fire support was maintained.

Ammunition shortages quickly developed, and as on-hand mortar ammunition beside the weapons was exhausted, volunteers dashed through fire-swept open areas to retrieve more rounds from storage bunkers. The destruction of the 105mm ammunition points caused an immediate crisis in the light howitzer pits. The cannon cockers (artillerymen) were forced to redistribute ammo by crawling from one gun section to another under a hail of enemy direct fire and spinning shrapnel from the exploding dump. The crews continued rendering direct fire, even though they were often embroiled in defending their own weapons. One light howitzer section was caught in an enemy crossfire between a heavy machine gun and rifles, until the artillerymen managed to turn their lowered muzzle and pump BEE HIVE flechettes into the enemy. All enemy automatic weapon fire against the howitzer was instantly silenced. Cavalry counterattacks reestablished the perimeter, and the enemy force began withdrawing, breaking contact at 0600.

The 1st Cav troopers suffered 9 dead and 160 wounded. The NVA's 95C regiment suffered hundreds of dead, many more wounded, and six were captured alive. The LZ was abandoned two weeks later.

== Tactical landing zones ==
Tactical landing zones (abbreviated to TLZ) are landing zones selected on the battlefield for the insertion of troops or supplies. A TLZ can be used for the landing of an aircraft (in terms of the Royal Air Force, this could be a Hercules carrying supplies or troops or any of their other helicopters, such as the Merlin, Puma or the Chinook). A TLZ would be situated in an area safer or easier to defend than the open battlefield, and troops are carefully trained in the insertion process and defensive circles are common.

== See also ==
- Drop zone
