= Falcon 9 B1060 =

Falcon 9 Block 5 first-stage booster

Falcon 9 booster B1060 (United States)

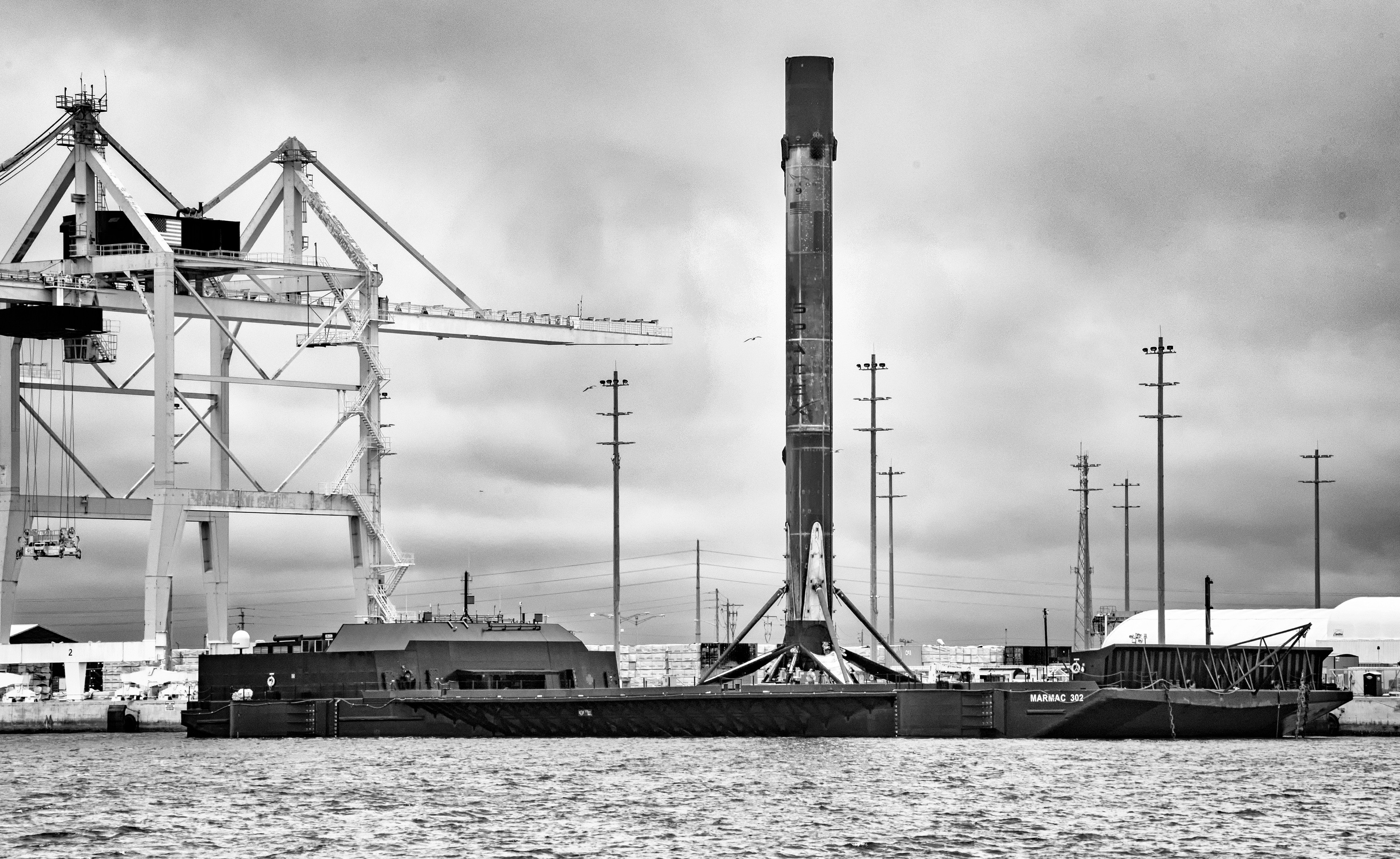
- B1060 on ASOG arriving into Port Canaveral after its 10th flight that sent some Starlink satellites to space

General information
- Type: Falcon 9 first stage booster
- National origin: United States
- Manufacturer: SpaceX
- Status: Retired; Expended
- Construction number: B1060
- Flights: 20

History
- First flight: 30 June 2020 (USA-304 Matthew Henson)
- Last flight: 28 April 2024 (Galileo FOC FM25 & FM27)

Falcon 9 B1060 was a Falcon 9 first-stage booster manufactured and operated by SpaceX. It was the senior active booster vehicle for the company since the demise of B1058 on 25 December 2023 during transit back to shore, until being expended for the Galileo FOC FM25 & FM27 mission on 28 April 2024. It had flown 20 missions and landed 19 times.

First flying in the summer of 2020, B1060 had broken several records in spaceflight, and launched the first successful American Lunar lander since 1972.

== Activities ==
=== First flight ===
On its maiden flight, B1060 launched GPS III SV03 into a middle Earth orbit with an inclination of 55 degrees from SLC-40. SpaceX was awarded five GPS III launches, with the then-Air Force awarding the company the satellite family's maiden launch in 2017. That mission was flown successfully on 23 December 2018, and required a newly built Falcon 9 Block 5 (B1054) to be expended on its maiden flight. This launch, the Space Force had approved for the rocket to withhold some of its propellant, allowing B1060 to land on droneship Just Read The Instructions after completing its mission.

=== Starlink duty and records ===
Due to landing failures of previous flight-proven boosters, the early success of B1060 was seen as key to expand SpaceX's Starlink service as quickly as possible.

For its second flight, B1060 was assigned to Starlink 11. This was slated to be the company's 100th launch, but that title eventually went to SAOCOM 1B. B1060 lofted 60 Starlink V1 satellites to low Earth orbit on 3 September 2020 and landed on Of Course I Still Love You. This was the first flight of this booster from LC-39A. B1060 flew its second Starlink mission, Starlink 14, on 24 October 2020, and landed on Just Read The Instructions. SpaceX was visibly working on its launch cadence, with the previous Starlink launch having taken place just four days prior. There were just 51 days between the second and third flight of this rocket, at the time an orbital flight turnaround world record. On its fifth flight, B1060 launched Starlink 18, just 28 hours before another Starlink mission, and broke a turnaround record again, this time launching twice in less than a month (27 days).

B1060 launched Starlink 22 on 24 March 2021, 15 years to the day after SpaceX's first orbital launch attempt (Falcon 1 flight 1). At the time, SpaceX planned for Starlink to have worldwide coverage later that year, while running a beta program. B1060 landed on Of Course I Still Love You after successfully completing its mission. The booster launched another 60 Starlink satellites to orbit for Starlink 24 on 29 April 2021, when SpaceX received permission to alter the trajectories of its Starlink satellites as the service stepped out of its beta phase.

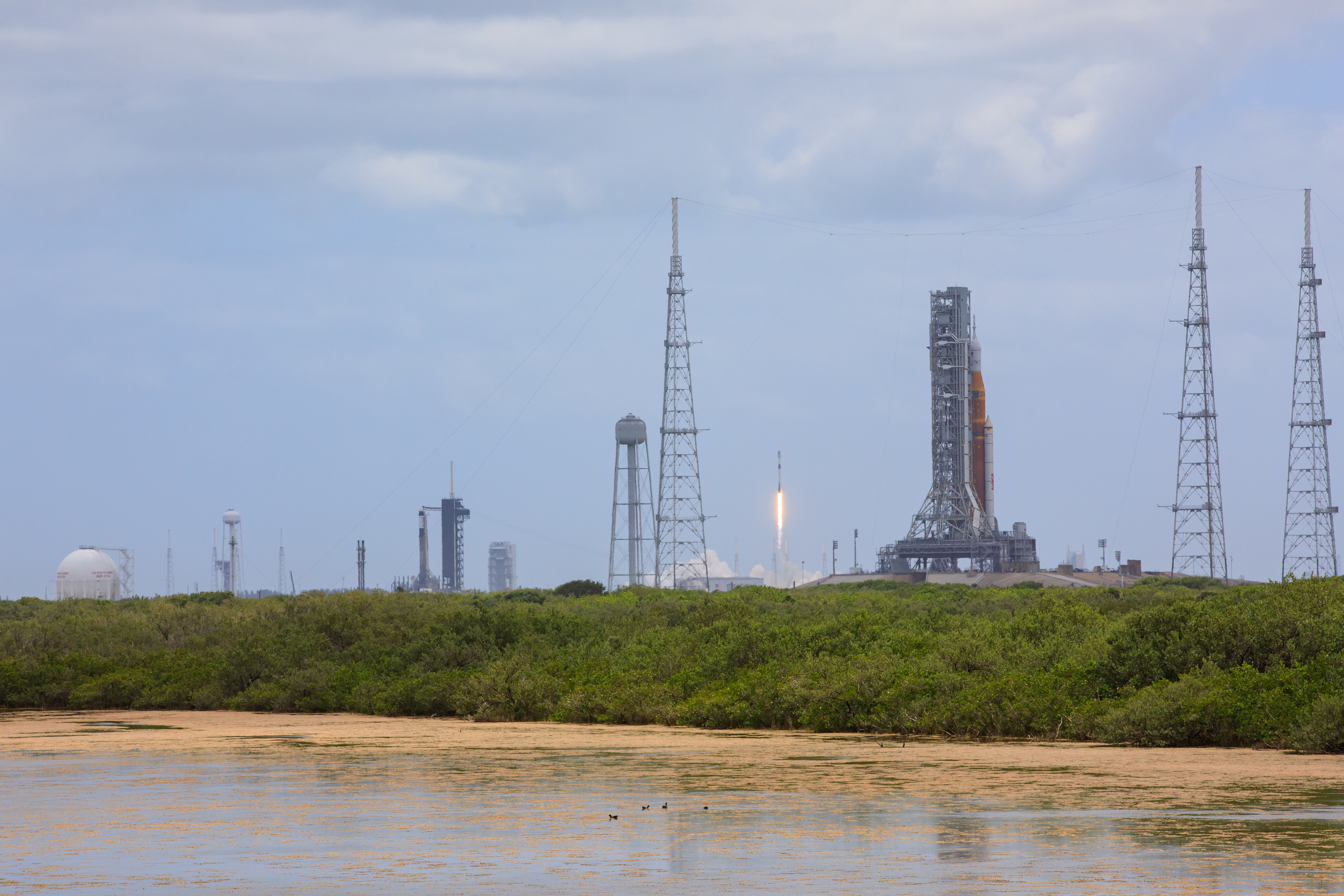
B1060 launching from SLC-40 during its 12th mission, while Ax-1 and Artemis 1 are on adjacent pads

B1060 launched six batches of Starlink V1.5 satellites, an upgrade announced in January 2021, between December 2021 and July 2023. During this period, SpaceX pushed the limits of its first-stage Falcon 9 boosters to launch, land and relaunch more frequently. By January 2022, B1060 was among four boosters with ten flights under its belt, marking the start of a longevity rivalry with Demo-2 booster B1058. After completing Group 4–19, B1060 became the first rocket booster to ever fly and land 13 times. It reached 15 at the beginning of 2023, requiring SpaceX to recertify its Falcon fleet for further duty in a process that lasted several months. In September that year, it reached 17 total flights with its first launch of Starlink V2 Mini satellites, from SLC-40. It launched its last batch of Starlink V2 Mini satellites from LC-39A on 24 March 2024, again on the anniversary of SpaceX's first orbital launch attempt.

=== Commercial satellite launches ===
The launch of Türksat 5A was the first orbital launch of 2021. It was preceded by a series of protests, owing to the tensions between Azerbaijan and Armenia, near SpaceX Headquarters. The launch was successful and B1060 landed on Just Read The Instructions. The rocket launched Galaxy 33 and 34 for Intelsat on 8 October 2022, and tied with B1058 for the most completed flights for first-stage rockets, at fourteen.

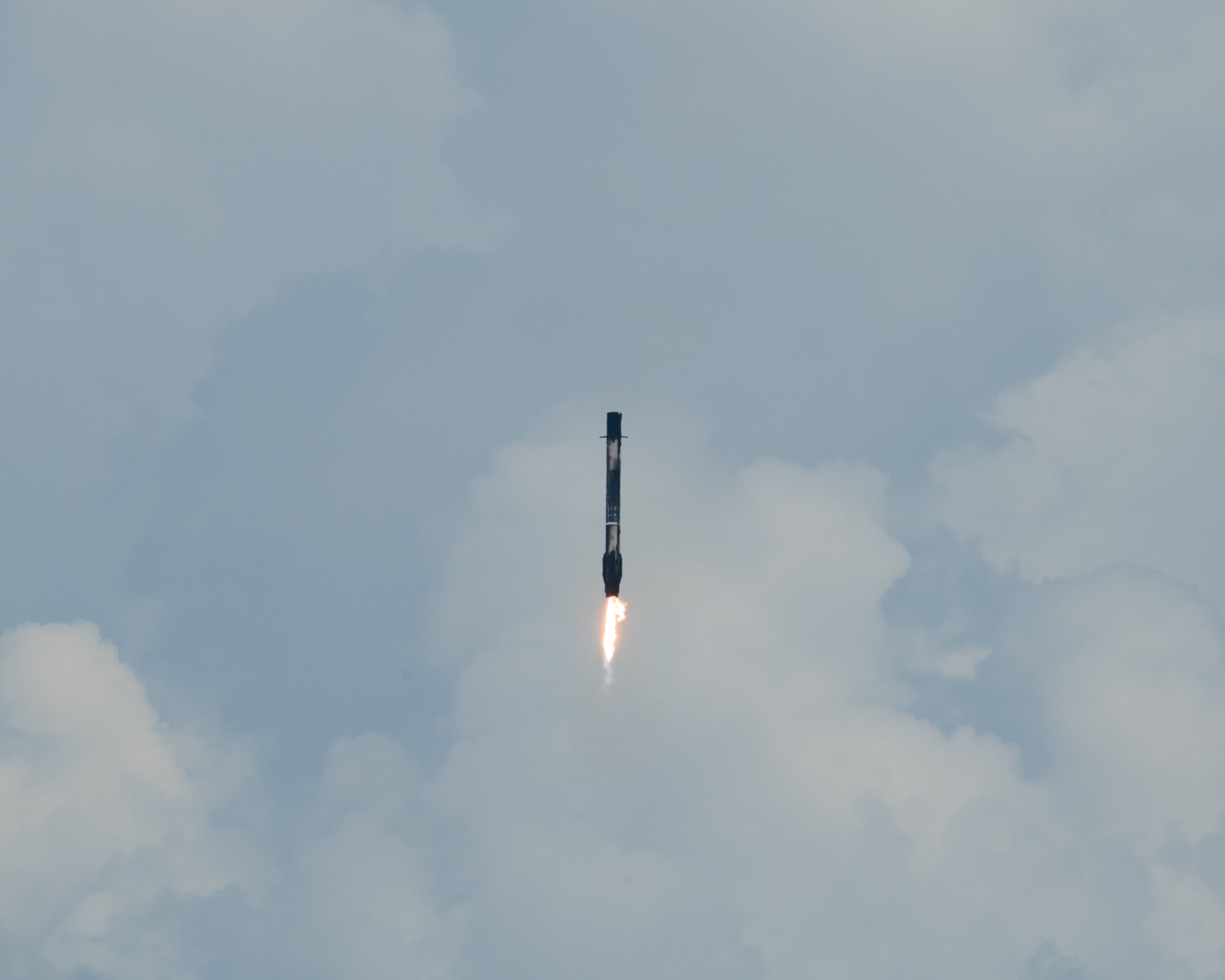
B1060 landing back at LZ-1 during its 8th mission

==== Transporter missions ====
Transporter, SpaceX's satellite ridesharing service, was established in 2019 to serve relatively affordable access to space for smaller businesses, universities and individuals, in particular for those operating large amounts of small satellites.

B1060 flew Transporter-2 on 30 June 2021, the anniversary of its first launch. It was the second mission to a polar orbit from Florida by SpaceX. A total of 88 payloads were released, including three Starlink satellites, several satellites for the Pentagon and the pathfinder for NASA's TROPICS mission. After stage separation, B1060 performed its first return-to-launch-site landing.

The booster opened a busy 2023 with the launch of its second ridesharing mission, Transporter-6, releasing 114 payloads into sun-synchronous orbit. SpaceX uploaded a sped-up onboard video of the booster's launch and landing on this mission.

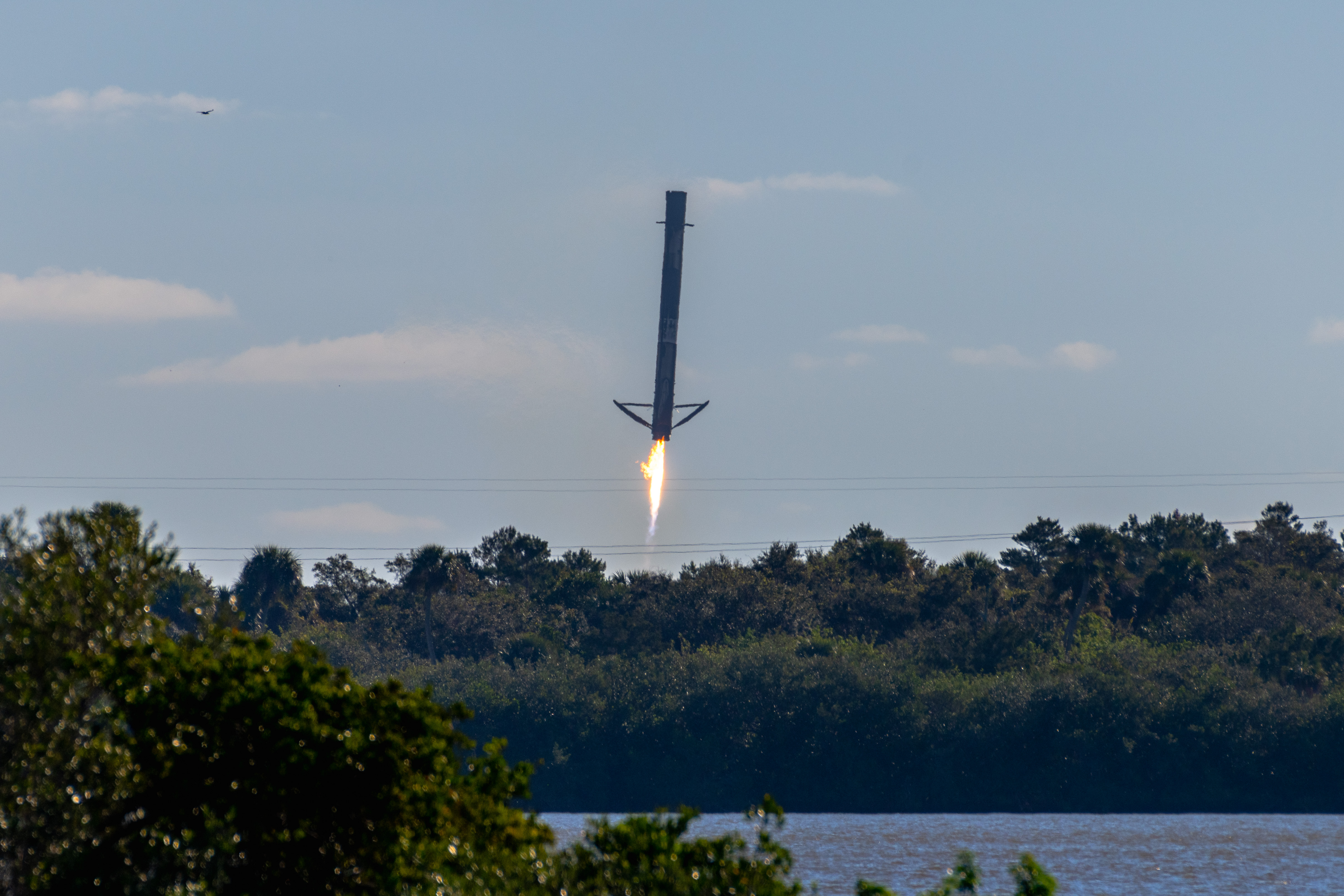
B1060 landing back at LZ-1 during its 15th mission

=== Launch of IM-1 ===
B1060 was assigned to IM-1, the second landing attempt for NASA's Commercial Lunar Payload Services program, in late January or early February 2024. It had not launched since September 2023.

The Nova-C lander, named Odysseus, was powered by liquid methane and oxygen, requiring it to be fueled on the launchpad while encapsulated in its payload fairing. Issues with this process delayed the launch with one day, but the mission launched within the tight window of opportunity, on 15 February 2024. This was the first time a Lunar mission lifted off from LC-39A since Apollo 17 in 1972, as well as the 300th Falcon 9 mission. The booster performed a successful return-to-launch-site landing at LZ-1, completing its eighteenth flight.

Odysseus would eventually touch down on Malapert A, becoming the first commercially developed vehicle to ever soft-land on the Moon, and the first successful American Lunar landing since the end of the Apollo program 52 years prior. NASA mentioned SpaceX as a key contributor to the success of this mission.

=== Galileo (final flight) ===
In the early 2020s, the European Space Agency was forced to move most launches of its fully European-produced satellites to SpaceX. The agency lost its own capability to launch heavier payloads after the retirement of the Ariane 5 in 2023, and tensions with Russia following its 2022 invasion of Ukraine put its use of Soyuz rockets on hold. While waiting for the Ariane 6 to become operational, the Falcon 9 became the agency's launch vehicle of choice. Among the payloads put forward are four satellites for Galileo, the European Union's independent satellite navigation system co-developed with ESA.

For its 20th and final flight, B1060 launched a pair of Galileo satellites, FM25 "Patrick" and FM27 "Julina", into medium-Earth orbit on 28 April 2024 UTC. ESA and the EU paid approximately €180 million ($192 million) to SpaceX to conduct two Galileo missions. Being the senior and one of the most often flown Falcon 9 first stages, the decision was made to use this booster for the flight, that required SpaceX to burn the rocket to depletion to meet the extra performance requirements needed for the mission.

== Flight history ==
Flight #	Launch date (UTC)	Payload (Note: Mission names are presented in parentheses when applicable.)	Mission # (Note: Entries with colored background and ♺ symbol denote flights using refurbished boosters from previous flights.)	Pictures	Launchpad	Landing location	Notes
1	30 June 2020	GPS III SV03 Matthew Henson	F9-088		SLC-40	Just Read the Instructions	Maiden flight of B1060 booster.
2	3 September 2020	Starlink × 60 (v1.0 L11)	F9-093 ♺		LC-39A	Of Course I Still Love You	Starlink mission.
3	24 October 2020	Starlink × 60 (v1.0 L14)	F9-096 ♺		SLC-40	Just Read the Instructions	Starlink mission and 100th successful launch of a Falcon vehicle.
4	8 January 2021	Türksat 5A	F9-104 ♺		SLC-40	Just Read the Instructions	This is the most powerful satellite in Türksat's fleet and will provide Ku-band television broadcast services over Turkey, the Middle East, Europe and Africa. The satellite was injected in to a Super-synchronous transfer orbit of 280 km × 55,000 km (170 mi × 34,180 mi) with 17.6° inclination.
5	4 February 2021	Starlink × 60 (v1.0 L18)	F9-107 ♺		SLC-40	Of Course I Still Love You	Starlink mission. This set a new booster turnaround record, at 27 days, and it was the first time a Falcon 9 flew twice within a month.
6	24 March 2021	Starlink × 60 (v1.0 L22)	F9-112 ♺		SLC-40	Of Course I Still Love You	Starlink mission.
7	29 April 2021	Starlink × 60 (v1.0 L24)	F9-115 ♺		SLC-40	Just Read the Instructions	Starlink mission.
8	30 June 2021	Transporter-2	F9-123 ♺		SLC-40	SpaceX Landing Zone 1	Dedicated 88 satellite rideshare mission.
9	2 December 2021	Starlink × 48 (Group 4-3)	F9-130 ♺		SLC-40	A Shortfall of Gravitas	Starlink mission with two BlackSky Gen-2 satellites (numbered 12 and 13) as rideshare payloads.
10	19 January 2022	Starlink × 49 (Group 4-6)	F9-137 ♺		LC-39A	A Shortfall of Gravitas	Starlink mission.
11	3 March 2022	Starlink × 47 (Group 4-9)	F9-143 ♺		LC-39A	Just Read the Instructions	Starlink mission.
12	21 April 2022	Starlink × 53 (Group 4-14)	F9-149 ♺		SLC-40	Just Read the Instructions	Starlink mission.
13	17 June 2022	Starlink × 53 (Group 4-19)	F9-158 ♺		LC-39A	A Shortfall of Gravitas	Starlink mission. This mission marked SpaceX's 100th reuse of a booster, 50th consecutive landing, 1st booster to fly for a 13th time, and 50th SpaceX launch from LC-39A.
14	8 October 2022	Galaxy 33 & 34	F9-180 ♺		SLC-40	A Shortfall of Gravitas	Northrop Grumman-built satellites for C-band clearing. At 7,350 kg total mass, this launch was one of the heaviest GTO SpaceX launches to date. This necessitated that the satellite be launched into a lower-energy orbit than a usual GTO, with its initial apogee at roughly 19,800 km (12,300 mi).
15	3 January 2023	Transporter-6	F9-195 ♺		SLC-40	SpaceX Landing Zone 1	Dedicated 115 satellite rideshare mission.
16	16 July 2023	Starlink x 54 (Group 5-15)	F9-239 ♺		SLC-40	A Shortfall of Gravitas	Last v1.5 Starlink launch. Second booster flying for the 16th time.
17	24 September 2023	Starlink v2 × 22 (Group 6-18)	F9-258 ♺		SLC-40	Just Read the Instructions	Starlink mission.
18	15 February 2024	IM-1 (Nova-C) Odysseus lander	F9-299 ♺		LC-39A	SpaceX Landing Zone 1	Launched a lunar lander with several payloads that successfully landed on the moon.
19	24 March 2024	Starlink v2 × 23 (Group 6-42)	F9-313 ♺		LC-39A	Just Read the Instructions	Starlink mission.
20	28 April 2024	Galileo FOC FM25 & FM27	F9-328		LC-39A	No Attempt	Galileo FOC M12 Mission.
