= List of Falcon 9 and Falcon Heavy launches (2020–2022) =

Left to right: Falcon 9 v1.0, v1.1, v1.2 "Full Thrust", Falcon 9 Block 5, Falcon Heavy, and Falcon Heavy Block 5.

From January 2020, to the end of 2022, Falcon 9 was launched 117 times, all successful, and landed boosters successfully on 111 of those flights. Falcon Heavy was launched once and was successful, including landing of the mission's two side boosters.

== Statistics ==
=== Rocket configurations ===
- Falcon 9 Block 5 (new)
- Falcon 9 Block 5 (reused)
- Falcon Heavy

=== Launch sites ===
- Cape Canaveral, SLC-40
- Kennedy, LC-39A
- Vandenberg, SLC-4E

=== Launch outcomes ===
- Success (commercial and government)
- Success (Starlink)

=== Booster landings ===
- Drone-ship failure
- Ground-pad success
- Drone-ship success
- No attempt

== Launches ==
=== 2020 ===
In late 2019, Gwynne Shotwell stated that SpaceX hoped for as many as 24 launches for Starlink satellites in 2020, in addition to 14 or 15 non-Starlink launches. At 26 launches, 14 of which were for Starlink satellites, Falcon 9 had its most prolific year, and Falcon rockets were second most prolific rocket family of 2020, only behind China's Long March rocket family.

Flight No.	Date and time (UTC)	Version, booster (Note: Falcon 9 first-stage boosters have a four-digit serial number. A decimal point followed by a number indicates the flight count. For example, B1021.1 and B1021.2 represent the first and second flights of booster B1021. Boosters without a decimal point were expended on their first flight. Additionally, missions where boosters are making their first flight are shown with a mint-colored background.)	Launch site	Payload (Note: Dragon spacecraft have a three-digit serial number. A decimal point followed by a number indicates the flight count. For example, C106.1 and C106.2 represent the first and second flights of Dragon C106.)	Payload mass	Orbit	Customer	Launch outcome	Booster landing
78	7 January 2020; 02:19:21	F9 B5; B1049-4	Cape Canaveral, SLC‑40	Starlink: Launch 2 (60 satellites)	15,600 kg (34,400 lb)	LEO	SpaceX	Success	Success (OCISLY)
78	Launch of 60 Starlink v1 satellites to a 570 km (350 mi) orbit at an inclination of 70° to expand internet constellation. One satellite included a test coating to make the satellite less reflective, and thus less likely to interfere with ground-based astronomical observations.								
79	19 January 2020; 15:30	F9 B5; B1046-4	Kennedy, LC‑39A	Crew Dragon in-flight abort test (Dragon C205.1)	12,050 kg (26,570 lb)	Sub-orbital	NASA (CTS)	Successful simulated failure	No attempt
79	An atmospheric test of the Dragon 2 abort system after Max Q. The capsule fired its SuperDraco engines, reached an apogee of 40 km (25 mi), deployed parachutes, and splashed down in the ocean 31 km (19 mi) downrange from the launch site. The test was previously slated to be accomplished with the Crew Dragon Demo-1 capsule; but that test article exploded during a ground test of SuperDraco engines on 20 April 2019. The abort test used the capsule originally intended for the first crewed flight. As expected, the booster was destroyed by aerodynamic forces after the capsule aborted. First flight of a Falcon 9 with only one functional stage — the second stage had a mass simulator in place of its engine.								
80	29 January 2020; 14:07	F9 B5; B1051-3	Cape Canaveral, SLC‑40	Starlink: Launch 3 (60 satellites)	15,600 kg (34,400 lb)	LEO	SpaceX	Success	Success (OCISLY)
80	Launch of 60 Starlink v1 satellites to a 550 km (340 mi) orbit at an inclination of 53° to expand internet constellation. One of the fairing halves was caught, while the other was fished out of the ocean.								
81	17 February 2020; 15:05	F9 B5; B1056-4	Cape Canaveral, SLC‑40	Starlink: Launch 4 (60 satellites)	15,600 kg (34,400 lb)	LEO	SpaceX	Success	Failure (OCISLY)
81	Launch of 60 Starlink v1 satellites to a 550 km (340 mi) orbit at an inclination of 53° to expand internet constellation. The first stage booster failed to land on the drone ship due to incorrect wind data. This was the first time a flight proven booster failed to land.								
82	7 March 2020; 04:50	F9 B5; B1059-2	Cape Canaveral, SLC‑40	SpaceX CRS-20 (Dragon C112.3)	1,977 kg (4,359 lb) (excl. Dragon mass)	LEO (ISS)	NASA (CRS)	Success	Success (LZ‑1)
82	Last launch of phase 1 of the CRS contract. Carries Bartolomeo, an ESA platform for hosting external payloads onto ISS. Originally scheduled to launch on 2 March 2020, the launch date was pushed back due to a second stage engine failure. SpaceX decided to swap out the second stage instead of replacing the faulty part. It was SpaceX's third flight of the Dragon C112 and the last launch of the Cargo Dragon spacecraft.								
83	18 March 2020; 12:16	F9 B5; B1048-5	Kennedy, LC‑39A	Starlink: Launch 5 (60 satellites)	15,600 kg (34,400 lb)	LEO	SpaceX	Success	Failure (OCISLY)
83	Launch of 60 Starlink v1 satellites to a 550 km (340 mi) orbit at an inclination of 53° to expand internet constellation. It was the first time a first stage booster flew for a fifth time and the second time the fairings were reused (Starlink flight in May 2019). Towards the end of the first stage burn, the booster suffered premature shut down of an engine, the first of a Merlin 1D variant and first since the CRS-1 mission in October 2012. However, the payload still reached the targeted orbit. This was the second Starlink launch booster landing failure in a row, later revealed to be caused by residual cleaning fluid trapped inside a sensor.								
84	22 April 2020; 19:30	F9 B5; B1051-4	Kennedy, LC‑39A	Starlink: Launch 6 (60 satellites)	15,600 kg (34,400 lb)	LEO	SpaceX	Success	Success (OCISLY)
84	Launch of 60 Starlink v1 satellites to a 550 km (340 mi) orbit at an inclination of 53° to expand internet constellation. The 84th flight of the Falcon 9 rocket, it surpassed Atlas V to become the most-flown operational US rocket. Used fairings launched on AMOS-17 (August 2019).								
85	30 May 2020; 19:22	F9 B5 B1058-1	Kennedy, LC‑39A	Crew Dragon Demo-2 (Crew Dragon C206.1 Endeavour)	12,530 kg (27,620 lb)	LEO (ISS)	NASA (CCDev)	Success	Success (OCISLY)
85	First crewed orbital spaceflight from American soil since Space Shuttle STS-135 in July 2011, carrying NASA astronauts Bob Behnken and Doug Hurley to the International Space Station. The SpaceX live stream was peaked at 4.1 million viewers, while NASA estimated roughly 10 million people watched on various online platforms, and approximately 150,000 people gathered on Florida's space coast despite the risks of the COVID-19 pandemic.								
86	4 June 2020; 01:25	F9 B5; B1049-5	Cape Canaveral, SLC‑40	Starlink: Launch 7 (60 satellites)	15,600 kg (34,400 lb)	LEO	SpaceX	Success	Success (JRTI)
86	Launch of 60 Starlink v1 satellites to a 550 km (340 mi) orbit at an inclination of 53° to expand internet constellation. Launch occurred on the 10th anniversary of the first Falcon 9 flight. Included "VisorSat" satellite test that uses a sunshade to limit reflectivity. First booster to successfully land five times, and first to land on Just Read The Instructions since it was moved to the East Coast.								
87	13 June 2020; 09:21	F9 B5; B1059-3	Cape Canaveral, SLC‑40	Starlink: Launch 8 (58 satellites)	15,410 kg (33,970 lb)	LEO	SpaceX	Success	Success (OCISLY)
87	13 June 2020; 09:21	F9 B5; B1059-3	Cape Canaveral, SLC‑40	SkySat-16, -17, -18	15,410 kg (33,970 lb)	LEO	Planet Labs	Success	Success (OCISLY)
87	Launch of 58 Starlink v1 satellites to a 550 km (340 mi) orbit at an inclination of 53° to expand internet constellation. Also included the launch of three SkySat satellites as part of the SpaceX SmallSat Rideshare Program. One payload fairing half launched on JCSat-18 / Kacific 1 mission in December 2019. The other payload fairing half flew on Starlink 2 v1.0 in January 2020. For the first time, SpaceX did not perform a static fire before launch.								
88	30 June 2020; 20:10:46	F9 B5; B1060-1	Cape Canaveral, SLC‑40	GPS III-03 (Matthew Henson)	4,311 kg (9,504 lb)	MEO	U.S. Space Force	Success	Success (JRTI)
88	Payload manufacturing contract awarded January 2012, fully assembled in August 2017, and completed thermal vacuum testing in June 2018. Launch contract was awarded initially for US$96.5 million, but later, this was discounted in exchange for allowing to launch configuration enabling booster recovery. The vehicle nicknamed Columbus was transported to Florida in February 2020, but launch was delayed by the customer from April 2020, due to the COVID-19 pandemic. The launch was dedicated to the memory of the recently deceased, late commander of the 21st Space Wing, Colonel Thomas G. Falzarano, and after launch, in October 2020, the nickname was changed to that of the Arctic explorer Matthew Henson. For second time, the second stage featured a gray banded Falcon long coast mission-extension kit, to allow more heat to be absorbed during the longer coasting period, while both fairings were recovered out of the water without attempting a catch in the net.								
89	20 July 2020; 21:30	F9 B5; B1058-2	Cape Canaveral, SLC‑40	ANASIS-II	5,000–6,000 kg (11,000–13,000 lb)	GTO	Republic of Korea Army	Success	Success (JRTI)
89	At 5–6 tonnes, the satellite formerly known as K-Milsat-1 is South Korea's first dedicated military satellite. Contracted by South Korea's Defense Acquisition Program Administration in 2014. 57th successful recovery of a Falcon 9 first stage. For the first time both fairing halves were also successfully caught by fairing catching ships. This launch featured a booster reflight within 51 days, a new record turnaround time for a Falcon booster. It was the same booster that launched the Crew Dragon Demo-2 spacecraft on 30 May 2020. The satellite was delivered to a super-synchronous transfer orbit of 211 km × 45,454 km (131 mi × 28,244 mi), while both fairing halves were caught in the catch nets of the supports ships.								
90	7 August 2020; 05:12	F9 B5; B1051-5	Kennedy, LC‑39A	Starlink: Launch 9 (57 satellites)	14,932 kg (32,919 lb)	LEO	SpaceX	Success	Success (OCISLY)
90	7 August 2020; 05:12	F9 B5; B1051-5	Kennedy, LC‑39A	SXRS-1 (BlackSky Global 7 and 8)	14,932 kg (32,919 lb)	LEO	Spaceflight Industries (BlackSky)	Success	Success (OCISLY)
90	Launch of 57 Starlink v1 satellites to a 550 km (340 mi) orbit at an inclination of 53° to expand internet constellation. Also included the launch of two BlackSky satellites as part of the SpaceX SmallSat Rideshare Program. This first rideshare contracted with Spaceflight Industries was dubbed internally as "SXRS-1". After previously testing on a single Starlink, the launch will have all 57 satellites include a "VisorSat" to reduce their brightness.								
91	18 August 2020; 14:31	F9 B5; B1049-6	Cape Canaveral, SLC‑40	Starlink: Launch 10 (58 satellites)	15,440 kg (34,040 lb)	LEO	SpaceX	Success	Success (OCISLY)
91	18 August 2020; 14:31	F9 B5; B1049-6	Cape Canaveral, SLC‑40	SkySat-19, -20, -21	15,440 kg (34,040 lb)	LEO	Planet Labs	Success	Success (OCISLY)
91	Launch of 58 Starlink v1 satellites to a 550 km (340 mi) orbit at an inclination of 53° to expand internet constellation. Also included the launch of three SkySat satellites as part of the SpaceX SmallSat Rideshare Program. First time a booster made a 6th flight. The fairings previously flew on Starlink 3 v1.0. One fairing half was caught by Go Ms. Tree, the other was scooped out of the ocean.								
92	30 August 2020; 23:18	F9 B5; B1059-4	Cape Canaveral, SLC‑40	SAOCOM 1B; GNOMES 1 Tyvak-0172	3,130 kg (6,900 lb)	SSO	CONAE; PlanetIQ; Tyvak	Success	Success (LZ‑1)
92	The 100th launch in SpaceX's history, first time a commercial launch on a fourth launch of a booster, it deployed Earth-observing satellites built by Argentina's space agency CONAE and two rideshares. SpaceX was contracted in 2009 for an initial launch as early as 2013. Originally planned for launch from Vandenberg but launched from Cape Canaveral, which made it the first flight from there using the southern corridor to a polar orbit since 1969.								
93	3 September 2020; 12:46:14	F9 B5; B1060-2	Kennedy, LC‑39A	Starlink: Launch 11 (60 satellites)	15,600 kg (34,400 lb)	LEO	SpaceX	Success	Success (OCISLY)
93	Launch of 60 Starlink v1 satellites to a 550 km (340 mi) orbit at an inclination of 53° to expand internet constellation.								
94	6 October 2020; 11:29:34	F9 B5; B1058-3	Kennedy, LC‑39A	Starlink: Launch 12 (60 satellites)	15,600 kg (34,400 lb)	LEO	SpaceX	Success	Success (OCISLY)
94	Launch of 60 Starlink v1 satellites to a 550 km (340 mi) orbit at an inclination of 53° to expand internet constellation. Used a fairing half on its third launch. Also, the B1058 holds the title for the shortest time a booster reached three flights which is 129 days beating B1046 by 77 days.								
95	18 October 2020; 12:25:57	F9 B5; B1051-6	Kennedy, LC‑39A	Starlink: Launch 13 (60 satellites)	15,600 kg (34,400 lb)	LEO	SpaceX	Success	Success (OCISLY)
95	Launch of 60 Starlink v1 satellites to a 550 km (340 mi) orbit at an inclination of 53° to expand internet constellation. Second time a booster was flown six times and first time both fairing halves were flown a third time. Both fairing halves landed on their respective ships but one fairing broke the net on Ms Tree.								
96	24 October 2020; 15:31:34	F9 B5; B1060-3	Cape Canaveral, SLC‑40	Starlink: Launch 14 (60 satellites)	15,600 kg (34,400 lb)	LEO	SpaceX	Success	Success (JRTI)
96	Launch of 60 Starlink v1 satellites to a 550 km (340 mi) orbit at an inclination of 53° to expand internet constellation. 100th successful launch of a Falcon vehicle.								
97	5 November 2020; 23:24:23	F9 B5; B1062-1	Cape Canaveral, SLC‑40	GPS III-04 (Sacagawea)	4,311 kg (9,504 lb)	MEO	USSF	Success	Success (OCISLY)
97	Manufacturing contract awarded in January 2012, underwent thermal vacuum testing in December 2018, while the launch contract was awarded in March 2018. A launch attempt on 3 October 2020, was aborted two seconds before liftoff due to early start in two engines. Following the abort, two engines from B1062 were sent for further testing. The abort also caused delays to the Crew-1 launch to allow time for data review.								
98	16 November 2020; 00:27	F9 B5; B1061-1	Kennedy, LC‑39A	Crew-1 (Crew Dragon C207.1 Resilience)	~12,500 kg (27,600 lb)	LEO (ISS)	NASA (CCP)	Success	Success (JRTI)
98	First crew rotation of the commercial crew program, following the return in August of the crewed test flight mission Crew Demo 2. Originally designated "USCV-1" by NASA. Carried astronauts Victor Glover, Mike Hopkins, Shannon Walker and Soichi Noguchi, for a 6-month stay aboard the ISS, during which the Boeing Starliner OFT flight launched but was unable to dock as expected. The first flight of the crew program was initially expected to launch in 2017, and finished final certifications in November 2020.								
99	21 November 2020; 17:17:08	F9 B5 B1063-1	Vandenberg, SLC‑4E	Sentinel-6 Michael Freilich (Jason-CS A)	1,192 kg (2,628 lb)	LEO	NASA / NOAA / ESA / EUMETSAT	Success	Success (LZ‑4)
99	Named after the former director of NASA's Earth science program, it is a radar altimeter satellite part of the Ocean Surface Topography constellation located at 1,336 km (830 mi) and 66° inclination, and a follow-up to Jason 3 as a partnership between the United States (NOAA and NASA), Europe (EUMETSAT, ESA, CNES).								
100	25 November 2020; 02:13	F9 B5; B1049-7	Cape Canaveral, SLC‑40	Starlink: Launch 15 (60 satellites)	15,600 kg (34,400 lb)	LEO	SpaceX	Success	Success (OCISLY)
100	Launch of 60 Starlink v1 satellites to a 550 km (340 mi) orbit at an inclination of 53° to expand internet constellation. First time a booster was launched for a seventh time and first time SpaceX completed four launches in a single month.								
101	6 December 2020; 16:17:08	F9 B5; B1058-4	Kennedy, LC‑39A	SpaceX CRS-21 (Dragon C208.1)	2,972 kg (6,552 lb) (excl. Dragon mass)	LEO (ISS)	NASA (CRS)	Success	Success (OCISLY)
101	First launch of phase 2 of the CRS contract of six launches awarded in January 2016. It was the first launch of the upgraded version Cargo Dragon 2 spacecraft, with increased payload capacity and autonomous docking to the ISS. Payloads included Nanoracks Bishop Airlock and CFIG-1 (Cool Flames Investigation with Gases). It's also the 100th successful Falcon 9 launch.								
102	13 December 2020; 17:30:00	F9 B5; B1051-7	Cape Canaveral, SLC‑40	SXM-7	7,000 kg (15,000 lb)	GTO	SiriusXM	Success	Success (JRTI)
102	Launched the largest, high-power broadcasting satellite for SiriusXM's digital audio radio service (DARS). SXM-7 was built by Maxar Technologies; intended to operate in the S-band spectrum, it will replace the SXM-3 satellite. The satellite will deliver the highest power density of any commercial satellite on-orbit, generate more than 20 kW of power, and have a large unfoldable antenna reflector, which enables broadcast to radios without the need for large dish-type antennas on the ground. Due to the heavy weight, the payload was injected into a sub-synchronous orbit of 224 km × 19,411 km (139 mi × 12,061 mi) and the satellite itself will transfer to full GTO. It was the first time a commercial primary payload flew on a booster which had been flown more than 4 times before. First dedicated customer launch where the fairings were previously used.								
103	19 December 2020; 14:00:00	F9 B5; B1059-5	Kennedy, LC‑39A	NROL-108	Classified	LEO	NRO	Success	Success (LZ‑1)
103	The planned launch was not known by the public until FCC filings appeared in late September followed by confirmation from the NRO on 5 October 2020, likely a relatively light payload that allows the return of the booster to the launch site.								

=== 2021 ===
In October 2020, Elon Musk indicated he wanted to be able to increase launches to 48 in 2021. Regulatory documents filed in February 2020, specified a maximum of 60 launches per year from Florida for Falcon 9 and another ten for Falcon Heavy, according to its 2020, environmental assessment. 31 launches actually occurred in 2021; all were successful.

Flight No.	Date and time (UTC)	Version, booster	Launch site	Payload	Payload mass	Orbit	Customer	Launch outcome	Booster landing
104	8 January 2021; 02:15	F9 B5; B1060-4	Cape Canaveral, SLC‑40	Türksat 5A	3,500 kg (7,700 lb)	GTO	Türksat	Success	Success (JRTI)
104	A 3,500 kg (7,700 lb) satellite intended to be stationed at 31.0° east. This is the most powerful satellite in Türksat's fleet and will provide Ku-band television broadcast services over Turkey, the Middle East, Europe and Africa. The satellite was injected in to a Super-synchronous transfer orbit of 280 km × 55,000 km (170 mi × 34,180 mi) with 17.6° inclination.								
105	20 January 2021; 13:02:22	F9 B5; B1051-8	Kennedy, LC‑39A	Starlink: Launch 16 (60 satellites)	15,600 kg (34,400 lb)	LEO	SpaceX	Success	Success (JRTI)
105	Launch of 60 Starlink v1 satellites to a 550 km (340 mi) orbit at an inclination of 53° to expand internet constellation. The first booster to successfully launch and land eight times. Achieved a record turnaround time between two launches of the same booster of only 38 days and brought the total of launched Starlink satellites to over 1,000. SpaceX stated that the landing would occur during higher winds than usual; this test to expand the landing envelope was successfully passed by the booster.								
106	24 January 2021; 15:00	F9 B5; B1058-5	Cape Canaveral, SLC‑40	Transporter-1 (143 payload smallsat rideshare)	~5,000 kg (11,000 lb)	SSO	Various	Success	Success (OCISLY)
106	First dedicated smallsat rideshare launch arranged by SpaceX, targeting a 525 km (326 mi) altitude orbit. The launch deployed a record 143 satellites, consisting of 120 CubeSats, 11 microsatellites, 10 Starlinks, and 2 transfer stages. In addition, 2 hosted payloads and 1 non-separating dummy satellite were launched. These include SpaceBEE (x 36), Lemur-2 (x 8), ICEYE (x 3), UVSQ-SAT, ELaNa 35 (PTD-1), and Kepler nanosats (x 8). D-Orbit ION Satellite Carrier and 10 Starlink satellites made for testing optical laser inter-satellite links placed in a polar orbit and 2 of 15 payloads remained attached to SHERPA-FX1. Exolaunch deployed several small satellites and cubesats via their own deployment mechanisms. First flight of a Falcon 9 with a SHERPA-FX transfer stage called SHERPA-FX1.								
107	4 February 2021; 06:19	F9 B5; B1060-5	Cape Canaveral, SLC‑40	Starlink: Launch 18 (60 satellites)	15,600 kg (34,400 lb)	LEO	SpaceX	Success	Success (OCISLY)
107	Launch of 60 Starlink v1 satellites to a 550 km (340 mi) orbit at an inclination of 53° to expand internet constellation. This set a new booster turnaround record, at 27 days, and it was the first time a Falcon 9 flew twice within a month.								
108	16 February 2021; 03:59:37	F9 B5; B1059-6	Cape Canaveral, SLC‑40	Starlink: Launch 19 (60 satellites)	15,600 kg (34,400 lb)	LEO	SpaceX	Success	Failure (OCISLY)
108	Launch of 60 Starlink v1 satellites to a 550 km (340 mi) orbit at an inclination of 53° to expand internet constellation. A hole in a heat-shielding engine cover, which likely developed through fatigue, allowed recirculating hot exhaust gases to damage one of the Merlin 1D first-stage engines, causing it to shut down early during ascent. Engine-out capability of the Falcon 9 allowed the mission to continue and successfully deploy the 60 Starlink satellites to orbit. The issue caused the booster to fail its landing attempt and miss the droneship Of Course I Still Love You (OCISLY) after its entry burn, breaking the longest streak of 24 landing successes (since surpassed). During this mission, GO Ms. Tree and GO Ms. Chief were used for the last time to recover the fairings; SpaceX retired the fairing catching program in favor of fairing fishing. Both fairing catching ships were retired from SpaceX use.								
109	4 March 2021; 08:24:54	F9 B5; B1049-8	Kennedy, LC‑39A	Starlink: Launch 17 (60 satellites)	15,600 kg (34,400 lb)	LEO	SpaceX	Success	Success (OCISLY)
109	Launch of 60 Starlink v1 satellites to a 550 km (340 mi) orbit at an inclination of 53° to expand internet constellation. Launch had previously been postponed multiple times, causing the payload Starlink L17 to launch after the L18 and L19 missions. Featured for the first time, a fairing which was flying on its fourth flight. The second-stage deorbit burn failed, causing an uncontrolled reentry on 26 March 2021, over the west coast of the United States.								
110	11 March 2021; 08:13:29	F9 B5; B1058-6	Cape Canaveral, SLC‑40	Starlink: Launch 20 (60 satellites)	15,600 kg (34,400 lb)	LEO	SpaceX	Success	Success (JRTI)
110	Launch of 60 Starlink v1 satellites to a 550 km (340 mi) orbit at an inclination of 53° to expand internet constellation.								
111	14 March 2021; 10:01:26	F9 B5; B1051-9	Kennedy, LC‑39A	Starlink: Launch 21 (60 satellites)	15,600 kg (34,400 lb)	LEO	SpaceX	Success	Success (OCISLY)
111	Launch of 60 Starlink v1 satellites to a 550 km (340 mi) orbit at an inclination of 53° to expand internet constellation. First time a first-stage booster flew and landed for the ninth time. This flight also marked the fastest turnaround time for a fairing half, at 49 days. Both fairing halves previously flew on the Transporter-1 mission.								
112	24 March 2021; 08:28:24	F9 B5; B1060-6	Cape Canaveral, SLC‑40	Starlink: Launch 22 (60 satellites)	15,600 kg (34,400 lb)	LEO	SpaceX	Success	Success (OCISLY)
112	Launch of 60 Starlink v1 satellites to a 550 km (340 mi) orbit at an inclination of 53° to expand internet constellation. Fairing "wet recovery" achieved by contracted recovery vessel Shelia Bordelon for the first time. Both fairing halves were retrieved from the water.								
113	7 April 2021; 16:34:18	F9 B5; B1058-7	Cape Canaveral, SLC‑40	Starlink: Launch 23 (60 satellites)	15,600 kg (34,400 lb)	LEO	SpaceX	Success	Success (OCISLY)
113	Launch of 60 Starlink v1 satellites to a 550 km (340 mi) orbit at an inclination of 53° to expand internet constellation. This launch featured the second fastest booster turnaround time at 27 days and 8 hours (after Starlink 18 with B1060.5, which was 4 hours faster).								
114	23 April 2021; 09:49:02	F9 B5; B1061-2	Kennedy, LC‑39A	Crew-2 (Crew Dragon C206.2 Endeavour)	~13,000 kg (29,000 lb)	LEO (ISS)	NASA (CTS)	Success	Success (OCISLY)
114	Second operational flight of Crew Dragon for Commercial Crew Program. Transported NASA astronauts Shane Kimbrough and Megan McArthur, JAXA Astronaut Akihiko Hoshide and ESA astronaut Thomas Pesquet to the ISS. The four astronauts will spend 6 months aboard the ISS. Beginning with the Crew-2 mission, NASA has modified the contract to allow NASA astronauts to use flight-proven (reused) Dragon capsules and booster. Thus SpaceX reflew the Dragon used on Demo-2 and used Booster B1061-2 which had been used to launch Crew-1 in November 2020.								
115	29 April 2021; 03:44:30	F9 B5; B1060-7	Cape Canaveral, SLC‑40	Starlink: Launch 24 (60 satellites)	15,600 kg (34,400 lb)	LEO	SpaceX	Success	Success (JRTI)
115	Launch of 60 Starlink v1 satellites to a 550 km (340 mi) orbit at an inclination of 53° to expand internet constellation.								
116	4 May 2021; 19:01:07	F9 B5; B1049-9	Kennedy, LC‑39A	Starlink: Launch 25 (60 satellites)	15,600 kg (34,400 lb)	LEO	SpaceX	Success	Success (OCISLY)
116	Launch of 60 Starlink v1 satellites to a 550 km (340 mi) orbit at an inclination of 53° to expand internet constellation. Second time a booster flew for the ninth time.								
117	9 May 2021; 06:42:45	F9 B5; B1051-10	Cape Canaveral, SLC‑40	Starlink: Launch 27 (60 satellites)	15,600 kg (34,400 lb)	LEO	SpaceX	Success	Success (JRTI)
117	Launch of 60 Starlink v1 satellites to a 550 km (340 mi) orbit at an inclination of 53° to expand internet constellation. This was the first time a booster flew 10 times. Brought the total number of operational Starlink satellites in the first shell to approximately 1,516 out of a planned 1,584.								
118	15 May 2021; 22:56	F9 B5; B1058-8	Kennedy, LC‑39A	Starlink: Launch 26 (52 satellites)	15,440 kg (34,040 lb)	LEO	SpaceX	Success	Success (OCISLY)
118	15 May 2021; 22:56	F9 B5; B1058-8	Kennedy, LC‑39A	Capella-6	15,440 kg (34,040 lb)	LEO	Capella Space	Success	Success (OCISLY)
118	15 May 2021; 22:56	F9 B5; B1058-8	Kennedy, LC‑39A	Tyvak-0130	15,440 kg (34,040 lb)	LEO	Tyvak	Success	Success (OCISLY)
118	Launch of 52 Starlink v1 satellites to a 569 km × 582 km (354 mi × 362 mi) orbit to expand internet constellation. Also included the launch of a Capella Space satellite and a Tyvak satellite as part of the SpaceX SmallSat Rideshare Program. Targeted orbit was higher than other Starlink orbits due to the needs of the rideshare payloads. Fairing "wet recovery" done by contracted recovery vessel Shelia Bordelon for the last time.								
119	26 May 2021; 18:59:35	F9 B5; B1063-2	Cape Canaveral, SLC‑40	Starlink: Launch 28 (60 satellites)	15,600 kg (34,400 lb)	LEO	SpaceX	Success	Success (JRTI)
119	Final launch of 60 Starlink v1 satellites to a 550 km (340 mi) orbit at an inclination of 53° to complete the first shell of the internet constellation containing 1,584 satellites. It was 40th launch a fairing was reused, with one half being used for the 5th time (first fairing to do so) and the other for a 3rd time. This launch marks SpaceX's 100th successful launch in a row without in-flight failure since December 2015.								
120	3 June 2021; 17:29:17	F9 B5; B1067-1	Kennedy, LC‑39A	SpaceX CRS-22 (Dragon C209.1)	3,328 kg (7,337 lb) (excl. Dragon mass)	LEO (ISS)	NASA (CRS)	Success	Success (OCISLY)
120	Second of a minimum of six new cargo missions under the CRS-2 contract, which NASA awarded SpaceX in 2015. Mission was flown with an uncrewed Dragon 2 capsule, which carried solar panels, catalytic reactor for the station's life support system, an emergency air supply system, Kurs remote control unit, and a Potable Water Dispense (PWD) filter. Also carried were the RamSat cubesat as payload for ELaNa 36, the SOAR cubesat for the University of Manchester and the first Mauritian satellite MIR-SAT1 to be launched from the station later. This was the last mission the Of Course I Still Love You droneship supported on the east coast, since SpaceX began launching Starlink satellites from the West Coast starting in July, which requires a droneship landing. OCISLY was replaced by A Shortfall Of Gravitas droneship later that summer.								
121	6 June 2021; 04:26	F9 B5; B1061-3	Cape Canaveral, SLC‑40	SXM-8	7,000 kg (15,000 lb)	GTO	SiriusXM	Success	Success (JRTI)
121	A large, high-power broadcasting satellite for SiriusXM's digital audio radio service (DARS) contracted together with SXM-7 to replace the aging XM-4 satellite and allow broadcast to radios without the need for large dish-type antennas on the ground.								
122	17 June 2021; 16:09:35	F9 B5; B1062-2	Cape Canaveral, SLC‑40	USA-319 / GPS III-05 (Neil Armstrong)	4,331 kg (9,548 lb)	MEO	USSF	Success	Success (JRTI)
122	Manufacturing contract awarded February 2013. In March 2018, the Air Force announced it had awarded the launch contract for three GPS satellites to SpaceX. This is the first reused booster launch for a 'national security' mission. Fairing "wet recovery" was attempted by contracted recovery vessel Hos Briarwood for the first time. Both fairing halves were retrieved from water.								
123	30 June 2021; 19:31	F9 B5; B1060-8	Cape Canaveral, SLC‑40	Transporter-2 (88 payload smallsat rideshare)	Unknown (Note: Many Transporter and Bandwagon payloads are not public, or don't have a publicly revealed mass. SpaceX has not published a payload mass estimate for this mission.)	SSO	Various	Success	Success (LZ‑1)
123	A total of 88 payloads including prototype Starlink v1.5 satellites made for testing optical laser inter-satellite links (3x), Polar Vigilance (4x), Exolaunch YAM-2 & 3, Satellogic, Capella-5 HawkEye Cluster 3 (multiple sats), Spaceflight Industries (multiple sats including on two space tugs Sherpa-FX2 Sherpa-LTE1). LINCS 1 and 2 were reported to be tumbling uncontrolled due to "an issue with the launch vehicle".								
124	29 August 2021; 07:14:49	F9 B5; B1061-4	Kennedy, LC‑39A	SpaceX CRS-23 (Dragon C208.2)	~2,200 kg (4,900 lb) (excl. Dragon mass)	LEO (ISS)	NASA (CRS)	Success	Success (ASOG)
124	Third of six new cargo missions NASA awarded in 2015 to SpaceX under the CRS-2 contract to be flown after the initial 20 missions of phase 1 were completed in 2020. Includes FBCE, SoFIE. First time a booster landed on SpaceX's fourth droneship, A Shortfall of Gravitas (ASOG), marking the first use when SpaceX has three droneships in operation.								
125	14 September 2021; 03:55:50	F9 B5; B1049-10	Vandenberg, SLC‑4E	Starlink: Group 2-1 (51 satellites)	~13,260 kg (29,230 lb)	LEO	SpaceX	Success	Success (OCISLY)
125	First launch of 51 Starlink v1.5 satellites to a 570 km (350 mi) orbit at an inclination of 70° to expand internet constellation. The Starlink v1.5 satellites feature laser inter-satellite links, which are needed for high-latitude and mid-ocean coverage. First launch of Starlink satellites from Vandenberg Space Force Base, and first West coast launch in 10 months. Droneship Of Course I Still Love You (OCISLY) had recently moved from the Atlantic Ocean, through the Panama Canal, and was used for its first landing in the Pacific Ocean. Second booster to make a tenth flight and landing.								
126	16 September 2021; 00:02:56	F9 B5; B1062-3	Kennedy, LC‑39A	Inspiration4 (Crew Dragon C207.2 Resilience)	~12,519 kg (27,600 lb)	LEO	Jared Isaacman (Note: Promotion aimed at assisting St. Jude Children's Research Hospital)	Success	Success(JRTI)
126	SpaceX signed in February 2021, its first all-civilian flight for a crewed spacecraft with Jared Isaacman (Leadership), founder and CEO of Shift4 Payments, who commands and pilots the mission, and who donated the three other seats in the Crew Dragon vehicle's launch to LEO. The first of these three seats (Generosity) was won by Christopher Sembroski in a lottery, who donated to St. Jude Children's Research Hospital, the second seat (Hope) was awarded to Hayley Arceneaux, an ambassador associated with that hospital, and the third seat (Prosperity) was awarded to Sian Proctor, the winner of a contest between entrepreneurs who use Shift4Shop. The seats were awarded on 30 March 2021. The mission reached a circular orbit of about 585 km and lasted about three days. The docking adapter of Crew Dragon Resilience was replaced by a dome window.								
127	11 November 2021; 02:03:31	F9 B5; B1067-2	Kennedy, LC‑39A	Crew-3 (Crew Dragon C210.1 Endurance)	~13,000 kg (29,000 lb)	LEO (ISS)	NASA (CTS)	Success	Success (ASOG)
127	SpaceX's third operational Crew Dragon flight carried NASA astronauts Thomas Marshburn, Kayla Barron and Raja Chari as well as German ESA astronaut Matthias Maurer. It also carried up to 100 kg (220 lb) of cargo to the ISS.								
128	13 November 2021; 12:19	F9 B5; B1058-9	Cape Canaveral, SLC‑40	Starlink: Group 4-1 (53 satellites)	~15,635 kg (34,469 lb)	LEO	SpaceX	Success	Success (JRTI)
128	Launch of 53 Starlink v1.5 satellites to a 540 km (340 mi) orbit at an inclination of 53.2° to expand internet constellation. Fairing "wet recovery" was attempted by SpaceX multipurpose ship, Bob for the first time, and both fairing halves were retrieved from water.								
129	24 November 2021; 06:21	F9 B5; B1063-3	Vandenberg, SLC‑4E	Double Asteroid Redirection Test (DART)	624 kg (1,376 lb)	Heliocentric	NASA (LSP)	Success	Success (OCISLY)
129	Dart mission will measure the kinetic effects of crashing an impactor into the surface of the moon of 65803 Didymos asteroid. It is the first mission aiming to demonstrate asteroid redirect capability and the first NASA scientific mission using a previously flown booster. The launch contract was awarded to SpaceX for $69 million.								
130	2 December 2021; 23:12	F9 B5; B1060-9	Cape Canaveral, SLC‑40	Starlink: Group 4-3 (48 satellites)	~14,500 kg (32,000 lb)	LEO	SpaceX	Success	Success (ASOG)
130	2 December 2021; 23:12	F9 B5; B1060-9	Cape Canaveral, SLC‑40	SXRS-2 (BlackSky Global 12 and 13)	~14,500 kg (32,000 lb)	LEO	Spaceflight, Inc.	Success	Success (ASOG)
130	Launch of 48 Starlink v1.5 satellites to a 540 km (340 mi) orbit at an inclination of 53.2° to expand internet constellation. Also included the launch of two BlackSky satellites as part of the SpaceX SmallSat Rideshare Program. as rideshare payloads. The BlackSky satellites were released prior to the Starlink deployment, to a 435 km × 425 km (270 mi × 264 mi) orbit.								
131	9 December 2021; 06:00	F9 B5; B1061-5	Kennedy, LC‑39A	Imaging X-ray Polarimetry Explorer (IXPE)	325 kg (717 lb)	LEO	NASA (LSP)	Success	Success (JRTI)
131	SMEX 14 mission with three identical NASA telescopes on a single spacecraft, designed to measure X-rays. The launch contract was awarded to SpaceX for US$50.3 million, and is the smallest dedicated payload ever launched by Falcon 9 launch vehicle. However, the required exact equatorial orbit required an orbital plane change that meant an approximately 30% of Falcon 9's maximum theoretical performance for such an orbital profile (1.5-2 tons).								
132	18 December 2021; 12:41	F9 B5; B1051-11	Vandenberg, SLC‑4E	Starlink: Group 4-4 (52 satellites)	15,600 kg (34,400 lb)	LEO	SpaceX	Success	Success (OCISLY)
132	Launch of 52 Starlink v1.5 satellites to a 540 km (340 mi) orbit at an inclination of 53.2° to expand internet constellation. First time a Falcon 9 first stage booster flew for an eleventh time.								
133	19 December 2021; 03:58	F9 B5; B1067-3	Cape Canaveral, SLC‑40	Türksat 5B	4,500 kg (9,900 lb)	GTO	Türksat	Success	Success (ASOG)
133	The first GTO satellite partially built in Turkey, the 4,500 kg (9,900 lb) satellite is intended to be placed at 42.0° east. By launching at the opening of the Turksat-5B window, SpaceX set a new record for the shortest time between two Falcon 9 launches at 15 hours and 17 minutes. The previous record time was 44 hours and 17 minutes, set between the Starlink Group 2-1 and Inspiration4 missions.								
134	21 December 2021; 10:06	F9 B5; B1069-1	Kennedy, LC‑39A	SpaceX CRS-24 (Dragon C209.2)	2,989 kg (6,590 lb) (excl. Dragon mass)	LEO (ISS)	NASA (CRS)	Success	Success (JRTI)
134	Fourth of six new cargo missions NASA awarded in 2015 to SpaceX under the CRS-2 contract to be flown after the initial 20 missions of phase 1 were completed in 2020. First time SpaceX launched 5 rockets within the same calendar month. The ELaNa 38 mission, consisting of 4 cubesats, launched on this flight. SpaceX achieved the feat of 100 successful orbital rocket booster landings in this mission, coinciding with the 6th anniversary of its first booster landing. After landing, de-tanking and heading back home, the stage and Octagrabber were damaged in heavy seas.								

=== 2022 ===
There were 61 Falcon launches in 2022: one Falcon Heavy and 60 Falcon 9. Older environmental regulatory documents show that, in addition to launches from Vandenberg, SpaceX mentioned planning for up to 70 launches each year from its two Florida launch sites when it filed an environmental assessment in February 2020. In January 2022, information became public that SpaceX had intended to increase the pace of launches to 52 during 2022, after launching a record 31 times in 2021. In March 2022, Elon Musk stated that SpaceX was aiming for 60 Falcon launches in 2022. In the event, SpaceX did increase their launch cadence, exceeding the previous yearly record of 31 launches in just the first 29 weeks of 2022. 13 of the Falcon 9 launches were from Vandenberg. SpaceX launched over 633 tonnes this year (exclusive of undisclosed payload masses).

Flight No.	Date and time (UTC)	Version, booster	Launch site	Payload	Payload mass	Orbit	Customer	Launch outcome	Booster landing
135	6 January 2022; 21:49	F9 B5; B1062-4	Kennedy, LC‑39A	Starlink: Group 4-5 (49 satellites)	~14,500 kg (32,000 lb)	LEO	SpaceX	Success	Success (ASOG)
135	Launch of 49 Starlink v1.5 satellites to a 540 km (340 mi) orbit at an inclination of 53.2° to expand internet constellation. After the weather-related damage to the landed booster in the previous launch, SpaceX changed the Starlink launch trajectory from Northeast to Southeast intending to increase odds of good booster and fairing recovery conditions in the winter months, on a course just North of the Bahamas via a plane change maneuver to line up with the proper orbital plane for the Starlink satellites.								
136	13 January 2022; 15:25:38	F9 B5; B1058-10	Cape Canaveral, SLC‑40	Transporter-3 (105 payload smallsat rideshare)	Unknown	SSO	Various	Success	Success (LZ‑1)
136	Dedicated SmallSat Rideshare mission to Sun-synchronous orbit. A total of 105 payloads including: Planet Labs SuperDoves (×44), and some of the customer payloads on SpaceFlight's SXRS-6 mission. In addition, four secret satellites, likely test or operational satellites built by SpaceX based on the Starshield bus (based on Starlink Block v1.5 or v2.0 technology), were also deployed for the US army. Their purpose has not been revealed, but is likely either technical demonstration, communications, earth observation or signals intelligence. In 2020, SpaceX had won a US$149 million contract for developing and launching missile tracking satellites based on the Starlink architecture.								
137	19 January 2022; 02:02:40	F9 B5; B1060-10	Kennedy, LC‑39A	Starlink: Group 4-6 (49 satellites)	~14,500 kg (32,000 lb)	LEO	SpaceX	Success	Success (ASOG)
137	Launch of 49 Starlink v1.5 satellites to a 540 km (340 mi) orbit at an inclination of 53.2° to expand internet constellation. Second Starlink launch where SpaceX has significantly customized a Starlink launch trajectory to optimize for booster recovery after Starlink Group 4–5.								
138	31 January 2022; 23:11	F9 B5; B1052-3	Cape Canaveral, SLC‑40	CSG-2	2,205 kg (4,861 lb)	SSO	ASI	Success	Success (LZ‑1)
138	Second COSMO-SkyMed 2nd-generation satellite. Originally scheduled to launch in 2021, on an Arianespace Vega-C launch vehicle, resulting delays caused by the pandemic and two Vega launch failures led to ASI purchasing a Falcon 9 launch contract in September 2021, for the 2.2-ton satellite. First launch of a converted Falcon 9 that was previously used as a FH side booster.								
139	2 February 2022; 20:27	F9 B5; B1071-1	Vandenberg, SLC‑4E	NROL-87	Classified	SSO	NRO	Success	Success (LZ‑4)
139	Classified payload. The contract requirements for this launch called for a 512 km (318 mi) sun-synchronous orbit at 97.4° inclination. The National Reconnaissance Office called the launch a success.								
140	3 February 2022; 18:13	F9 B5; B1061-6	Kennedy, LC‑39A	Starlink: Group 4-7 (49 satellites)	~14,500 kg (32,000 lb)	LEO	SpaceX	Success	Success (ASOG)
140	Launch of 49 Starlink v1.5 satellites to a 540 km (340 mi) orbit at an inclination of 53.2° to expand internet constellation. A fairing half on this mission was flown and recovered for a record 6th time. A G2-rated geomagnetic storm on 4 February significantly increased the atmospheric density at the initial deployment orbit, resulting in 38 satellites reentering over the following eight days.								
141	21 February 2022; 14:44	F9 B5; B1058-11	Cape Canaveral, SLC‑40	Starlink: Group 4-8 (46 satellites)	~13,600 kg (30,000 lb)	LEO	SpaceX	Success	Success (ASOG)
141	Launch of 46 Starlink v1.5 satellites to a 540 km (340 mi) orbit at an inclination of 53.2° to expand internet constellation. This was the first Group 4 mission to feature two upper stage burns like v1 Starlink launches, with deployment of the satellites approximately one hour after lift-off into a higher circular orbit. This is aimed at reducing the risk of high drag that caused 38 of the Group 4-7 satellites to fail reaching their intended orbits, and instead, reenter shortly after launch.								
142	25 February 2022; 17:12	F9 B5; B1063-4	Vandenberg, SLC‑4E	Starlink: Group 4-11 (50 satellites)	~14,750 kg (32,520 lb)	LEO	SpaceX	Success	Success (OCISLY)
142	Launch of 50 Starlink v1.5 satellites to a 540 km (340 mi) orbit at an inclination of 53.2° to expand internet constellation.								
143	3 March 2022; 14:25	F9 B5; B1060-11	Kennedy, LC‑39A	Starlink: Group 4-9 (47 satellites)	~13,900 kg (30,600 lb)	LEO	SpaceX	Success	Success (JRTI)
143	Launch of 47 Starlink v1.5 satellites to a 540 km (340 mi) orbit at an inclination of 53.2° to expand internet constellation. First time one of SpaceX multipurpose ships, Bob, retrieved both fairing halves and towed the droneship and the Falcon booster on its return journey to Port Canaveral.								
144	9 March 2022; 13:45	F9 B5; B1052-4	Cape Canaveral, SLC‑40	Starlink: Group 4-10 (48 satellites)	~14,160 kg (31,220 lb)	LEO	SpaceX	Success	Success (ASOG)
144	Launch of 48 Starlink v1.5 satellites to a 540 km (340 mi) orbit at an inclination of 53.2° to expand internet constellation. This was the 40th Starlink launch. Starlink 3680 (or Starlink 2022-025P) launched in this stack maneuvered to join Shell 1 of Starlink satellites.								
145	19 March 2022; 04:42	F9 B5; B1051-12	Cape Canaveral, SLC‑40	Starlink: Group 4-12 (53 satellites)	~16,250 kg (35,830 lb)	LEO	SpaceX	Success	Success (JRTI)
145	Launch of 53 Starlink v1.5 satellites to a 540 km (340 mi) orbit at an inclination of 53.2° to expand internet constellation. First time a Falcon 9 first-stage booster flew and landed for the twelfth time. This was, at the time, the heaviest Falcon 9 payload to LEO enabled by optimizations to the launch setup and flight profile.								
146	1 April 2022; 16:24	F9 B5; B1061-7	Cape Canaveral, SLC‑40	Transporter-4 (40 payload smallsat rideshare)	Unknown	SSO	Various	Success	Success (JRTI)
146	Dedicated SmallSat Rideshare mission to Sun-synchronous orbit. The heaviest payload aboard was Environmental Mapping and Analysis Program (EnMAP) German satellite. Other payloads included D-Orbit ION, Hawk-6A/6B/6C, CNCE (2), Heron Mk II, GNOMES-3, Kilimanjaro-1.								
147	8 April 2022; 15:17:11	F9 B5; B1062-5	Kennedy, LC‑39A	Axiom-1 (Crew Dragon C206.3 Endeavour)	~13,000 kg (29,000 lb)	LEO (ISS)	Axiom Space	Success	Success (ASOG)
147	Announced in March 2020, the flight is the first fully private flight to the ISS. Crew Dragon is commanded by Axiom professional astronaut Michael López-Alegría. Larry Connor is the pilot, and Mark Pathy and Eytan Stibbe are mission specialists.								
148	17 April 2022; 13:13:12	F9 B5; B1071-2	Vandenberg, SLC‑4E	NROL-85 (Intruder 13A [NOSS-3 9A] and Intruder 13B [(NOSS-3 9B])	Classified	LEO	NRO	Success	Success (LZ‑4)
148	Classified mission awarded to SpaceX in February 2019. The contract requirements for this launch called for a 1220 km × 1024 km orbit at 63.5° inclination, which corresponds to a Naval Reconnaissance (Intruder) mission. With only a year before the launch, the launch site was switched from Florida to California at no extra cost in exchange for reusing a previously flown booster. The National Reconnaissance Office declared the launch a success.								
149	21 April 2022; 17:51	F9 B5; B1060-12	Cape Canaveral, SLC‑40	Starlink: Group 4-14 (53 satellites)	~16,250 kg (35,830 lb)	LEO	SpaceX	Success	Success (JRTI)
149	Launch of 53 Starlink v1.5 satellites to a 540 km (340 mi) orbit at an inclination of 53.2° to expand internet constellation.								
150	27 April 2022; 07:52	F9 B5; B1067-4	Kennedy, LC‑39A	Crew-4 (Crew Dragon C212.1 Freedom)	~13,000 kg (29,000 lb)	LEO (ISS)	NASA (CTS)	Success	Success (ASOG)
150	Fourth Crew Dragon CCP mission. Carried four astronauts and 100 kg (220 lb) of cargo to the ISS and function as a lifeboat to evacuate astronauts from ISS in case of an emergency. NASA's Kjell Lindgren, Bob Hines, and Jessica Watkins as well as ESA's Samantha Cristoforetti assigned to fly this mission.								
151	29 April 2022; 21:27	F9 B5; B1062-6	Cape Canaveral, SLC‑40	Starlink: Group 4-16 (53 satellites)	~16,250 kg (35,830 lb)	LEO	SpaceX	Success	Success (JRTI)
151	Launch of 53 Starlink v1.5 satellites to a 540 km (340 mi) orbit at an inclination of 53.2° to expand internet constellation. This mission set four SpaceX records: fastest booster turnaround (21 days, previously 27 days), pad turnaround (8 days), droneship turnaround (departed 19 hours after arriving), and it was the first time there were six launches in a single calendar month.								
152	6 May 2022; 09:46	F9 B5; B1058-12	Kennedy, LC‑39A	Starlink: Group 4-17 (53 satellites)	~16,250 kg (35,830 lb)	LEO	SpaceX	Success	Success (ASOG)
152	Launch of 53 Starlink v1.5 satellites to a 540 km (340 mi) orbit at an inclination of 53.2° to expand internet constellation.								
153	13 May 2022; 22:07	F9 B5; B1063.5	Vandenberg, SLC‑4E	Starlink: Group 4-13 (53 satellites)	~16,250 kg (35,830 lb)	LEO	SpaceX	Success	Success (OCISLY)
153	Launch of 53 Starlink v1.5 satellites to a 540 km (340 mi) orbit at an inclination of 53.2° to expand internet constellation.								
154	14 May 2022; 20:40	F9 B5 B1073.1	Cape Canaveral, SLC‑40	Starlink: Group 4-15 (53 satellites)	~16,250 kg (35,830 lb)	LEO	SpaceX	Success	Success (JRTI)
154	Launch of 53 Starlink v1.5 satellites to a 540 km (340 mi) orbit at an inclination of 53.2° to expand internet constellation. First Starlink launch on a new first-stage booster.								
155	18 May 2022; 10:59	F9 B5; B1052-5	Kennedy, LC‑39A	Starlink: Group 4-18 (53 satellites)	~16,250 kg (35,830 lb)	LEO	SpaceX	Success	Success (ASOG)
155	Launch of 53 Starlink v1.5 satellites to a 540 km (340 mi) orbit at an inclination of 53.2° to expand internet constellation.								
156	25 May 2022; 18:35	F9 B5; B1061-8	Cape Canaveral, SLC‑40	Transporter-5 (59 payload smallsat rideshare)	Unknown	SSO	Various	Success	Success (LZ‑1)
156	Dedicated SmallSat Rideshare mission launching 59 satellites to Sun-synchronous orbit. Mission included 3 different payload dispensers by Momentus (Vigoride space tug), Spaceflight, and D-Orbit, and payloads from 11 countries by Exolaunch.								
157	8 June 2022; 21:03	F9 B5; B1062-7	Cape Canaveral, SLC‑40	Nilesat-301	~4,100 kg (9,000 lb)	GTO	Nilesat	Success	Success (JRTI)
157	Built by Thales Alenia Space, the Egyptian satellite will be stationed at 7.0° west. SpaceX successfully executed the furthest downrange landing of a Falcon 9 booster on this mission by landing 687 km (427 mi) away from the launch site.								
158	17 June 2022; 16:09	F9 B5; B1060-13	Kennedy, LC‑39A	Starlink: Group 4-19 (53 satellites)	~16,250 kg (35,830 lb)	LEO	SpaceX	Success	Success (ASOG)
158	Launch of 53 Starlink v1.5 satellites to a 540 km (340 mi) orbit at an inclination of 53.2° to expand internet constellation. This mission marked SpaceX's 100th reuse of a booster, 50th consecutive landing, first booster to fly for a 13th time, and 50th SpaceX launch from LC-39A.								
159	18 June 2022; 14:19	F9 B5; B1071-3	Vandenberg, SLC‑4E	SARah 1	~4,000 kg (8,800 lb)	SSO	German Intelligence Service	Success	Success (LZ‑4)
159	Airbus-built phased-array-antenna satellite intended to upgrade the German SAR-Lupe surveillance satellites.								
160	19 June 2022; 04:27	F9 B5; B1061-9	Cape Canaveral, SLC‑40	Globalstar-2 M087 (FM15); USA 328-331	~700 kg (1,500 lb) (excluding secret payloads)	LEO	Globalstar; Unknown US government agency	Success	Success (JRTI)
160	Mission launched the first Globalstar satellite since 2013, a spare satellite that was still waiting on ground for its launch. The mission was not known by the public until early June, when a FCC filing appeared. The low mass of the satellite, together with the lack of return to the launch site and the use of an unconventional payload dispenser, led to speculations about there being a second, undisclosed governmental payload. After launch, four USA designated satellites were cataloged, confirming the presence of four secret US Government payloads that were released between second-stage cutoff 1 and second-stage startup 2. Likely the satellites were test or operational satellites built by SpaceX based on the Starshield bus (based on Starlink Block v1.5 or v2.0 technology), based on the deployment structure seen in the launch video. Their purpose has not been revealed, but is likely either technical demonstration, communications, earth observation or signals intelligence. SpaceX set a new record for the shortest time between two Falcon 9 launches at 14 hours and 8 minutes. The previous record time was 15 hours and 17 minutes, set between the Starlink Group 4-4 and Türksat 5B missions.								
161	29 June 2022; 21:04	F9 B5; B1073-2	Cape Canaveral, SLC‑40	SES-22	~3,500 kg (7,700 lb)	GTO	SES	Success	Success (ASOG)
161	Following the award for the launch of SES-18 and SES-19, SpaceX was awarded another launch contract for SES-22. Built by Thales Alenia Space, the C-band-only satellite will be stationed at 135° west and is expected to start operations by early August 2022.								
162	7 July 2022; 13:11	F9 B5; B1058-13	Cape Canaveral, SLC‑40	Starlink: Group 4-21 (53 satellites)	~16,250 kg (35,830 lb)	LEO	SpaceX	Success	Success (JRTI)
162	Launch of 53 Starlink v1.5 satellites to a 540 km (340 mi) orbit at an inclination of 53.2° to expand internet constellation.								
163	11 July 2022; 01:39	F9 B5; B1063-6	Vandenberg, SLC‑4E	Starlink: Group 3-1 (46 satellites)	~14,100 kg (31,100 lb)	SSO	SpaceX	Success	Success (OCISLY)
163	Launch of 46 Starlink v1.5 satellites to a 560 km (350 mi) orbit at an inclination of 97.6° to expand internet constellation.								
164	15 July 2022; 00:44:22	F9 B5; B1067-5	Kennedy, LC‑39A	SpaceX CRS-25 (Dragon C208.3)	2,668 kg (5,881 lb) (excl. Dragon mass)	LEO (ISS)	NASA (CRS)	Success	Success (ASOG)
164	Fifth of the six ISS cargo missions awarded in 2015 under the CRS-2 contract, and carried Earth Surface Mineral Dust Source Investigation (EMIT) external payload.								
165	17 July 2022; 14:20	F9 B5; B1051-13	Cape Canaveral, SLC‑40	Starlink: Group 4-22 (53 satellites)	~16,250 kg (35,830 lb)	LEO	SpaceX	Success	Success (JRTI)
165	Launch of 53 Starlink v1.5 satellites to a 540 km (340 mi) orbit at an inclination of 53.2° to expand internet constellation. It was the first time SpaceX launched an 8th rocket within 30 days.								
166	22 July 2022; 17:39	F9 B5; B1071-4	Vandenberg, SLC‑4E	Starlink: Group 3-2 (46 satellites)	~14,100 kg (31,100 lb)	SSO	SpaceX	Success	Success (OCISLY)
166	Launch of 46 Starlink v1.5 satellites to a 560 km (350 mi) orbit at an inclination of 97.6° to expand internet constellation.								
167	24 July 2022; 13:38	F9 B5; B1062-8	Kennedy, LC‑39A	Starlink: Group 4-25 (53 satellites)	~16,250 kg (35,830 lb)	LEO	SpaceX	Success	Success (ASOG)
167	Launch of 53 Starlink v1.5 satellites to a 540 km (340 mi) orbit at an inclination of 53.2° to expand internet constellation. A fairing half on this mission was flown and recovered for a record 7th time.								
168	4 August 2022; 23:08	F9 B5; B1052-6	Cape Canaveral, SLC‑40	Danuri (Korea Pathfinder Lunar Orbiter)	~679 kg (1,497 lb)	BLT	KARI	Success	Success (JRTI)
168	4 August 2022; 23:08	F9 B5; B1052-6	Cape Canaveral, SLC‑40	"Photo in Space"	~679 kg (1,497 lb)	Heliocentric	Tesla	Success	Success (JRTI)
168	South Korea's first lunar mission. Mission was placed into a ballistic lunar transfer (BLT) orbit. Second stage included a hosted promotional "Launch Your Photo into Deep Space Orbit" mosaic payload by automotive manufacturer Tesla, which in 2018 offered a referral bonus to customers where they could send an image of their choice to be laser-etched into a mosaic plaque and launched to deep space.								
169	10 August 2022; 02:14	F9 B5; B1073-3	Kennedy, LC‑39A	Starlink: Group 4-26 (52 satellites)	~16,000 kg (35,000 lb)	LEO	SpaceX	Success	Success (ASOG)
169	Launch of 52 Starlink v1.5 satellites to a 540 km (340 mi) orbit at an inclination of 53.2° to expand internet constellation.								
170	12 August 2022; 21:40:20	F9 B5; B1061-10	Vandenberg, SLC‑4E	Starlink: Group 3-3 (46 satellites)	~14,100 kg (31,100 lb)	SSO	SpaceX	Success	Success (OCISLY)
170	Launch of 46 Starlink v1.5 satellites to a 560 km (350 mi) orbit at an inclination of 97.6° to expand internet constellation.								
171	19 August 2022; 19:21:20	F9 B5; B1062-9	Cape Canaveral, SLC‑40	Starlink: Group 4-27 (53 satellites)	~16,250 kg (35,830 lb)	LEO	SpaceX	Success	Success (ASOG)
171	Launch of 53 Starlink v1.5 satellites to a 540 km (340 mi) orbit at an inclination of 53.2° to expand internet constellation.								
172	28 August 2022; 03:41	F9 B5; B1069-2	Cape Canaveral, SLC‑40	Starlink: Group 4-23 (54 satellites)	~16,700 kg (36,800 lb)	LEO	SpaceX	Success	Success (ASOG)
172	Launch of 54 Starlink v1.5 satellites to a 540 km (340 mi) orbit at an inclination of 53.2° to expand internet constellation. Heaviest Falcon 9 payload to date. This flight, Group 4-23, was moved from 39A to 40 to deconflict with Artemis I operations at 39B. Booster B1069 was repaired after suffering damage to all 9 engines upon its initial landing.								
173	31 August 2022; 05:40	F9 B5; B1063-7	Vandenberg, SLC‑4E	Starlink: Group 3-4 (46 satellites)	~14,200 kg (31,300 lb)	SSO	SpaceX	Success	Success (OCISLY)
173	Launch of 46 Starlink v1.5 satellites to a 560 km (350 mi) orbit at an inclination of 97.6° to expand internet constellation.								
174	5 September 2022; 02:09	F9 B5; B1052-7	Cape Canaveral, SLC‑40	Starlink: Group 4-20 (51 satellites) Sherpa-LTC2	~16,000 kg (35,000 lb)	LEO	SpaceX Spaceflight Industries	Success	Success (JRTI)
174	Launch of 51 Starlink v1.5 satellites to a 540 km (340 mi) orbit at an inclination of 53.2° to expand internet constellation. Sherpa-LTC2 space tug's sole hosted payload was Boeing's Varuna Technology Demonstration Mission, a pathfinder for a planned constellation of broadband satellites. Initial orbit of Sherpa LTC-2 is same as that of Starlink but later it will fire its thrusters to reach a 54° inclination low Earth orbit located at 1,060 km (660 mi) altitude.								
175	11 September 2022; 01:20	F9 B5; B1058-14	Kennedy, LC‑39A	Starlink: Group 4-2 (34 satellites); BlueWalker-3	~11,938 kg (26,319 lb)	LEO	SpaceX; AST SpaceMobile	Success	Success (ASOG)
175	Launch of 34 Starlink v1.5 satellites to a 540 km (340 mi) orbit at an inclination of 53.2° to expand internet constellation. Bluewalker-3 is a rideshare mission launched to 513 km (319 mi) at an inclination of 53°. This required one of the most complex second stage operations to date, executed two burns to deploy the Bluewalker 3, followed by executing two more burns to deploy the Starlinks, and concluding with a deorbit burn. On this mission, B1058 became the first booster to be launched and recovered fourteen times.								
176	19 September 2022; 00:18	F9 B5; B1067-6	Cape Canaveral, SLC‑40	Starlink: Group 4-34 (54 satellites)	~16,700 kg (36,800 lb)	LEO	SpaceX	Success	Success (JRTI)
176	Launch of 54 Starlink v1.5 satellites to a 540 km (340 mi) orbit at an inclination of 53.2° to expand internet constellation.								
177	24 September 2022; 23:32	F9 B5; B1073-4	Cape Canaveral, SLC‑40	Starlink: Group 4-35 (52 satellites)	~16,100 kg (35,500 lb)	LEO	SpaceX	Success	Success (ASOG)
177	Launch of 52 Starlink v1.5 satellites to a 540 km (340 mi) orbit at an inclination of 53.2° to expand internet constellation.								
178	5 October 2022; 16:00	F9 B5; B1077-1	Kennedy, LC‑39A	Crew-5 (Crew Dragon C210.2 Endurance)	~13,000 kg (29,000 lb)	LEO (ISS)	NASA (CTS)	Success	Success (JRTI)
178	Fifth USCV launches out of NASA award of six Crew Dragon mission, to carry four astronauts and 100 kg (220 lb) of cargo to the ISS as well as feature a lifeboat function to evacuate astronauts from ISS in case of an emergency. NASA Astronauts Nicole Mann, Josh Cassada, JAXA Astronaut Koichi Wakata, and Roscosmos Cosmonaut Anna Kikina will fly on this mission. This will be the first Russian Cosmonaut to fly on a US Commercial Crew Vehicle as part of a NASA-Roscosmos seat barter agreement.								
179	5 October 2022; 23:10	F9 B5; B1071-5	Vandenberg, SLC‑4E	Starlink: Group 4-29 (52 satellites)	~16,100 kg (35,500 lb)	LEO	SpaceX	Success	Success (OCISLY)
179	Launch of 52 Starlink v1.5 satellites to a 540 km (340 mi) orbit at an inclination of 53.2° to expand internet constellation. SpaceX set a new record for the shortest time between two Falcon 9 launches at 7 hours and 10 minutes. The previous record time was 14 hours and 8 minutes, set between the SARah 1 and Globalstar-2 M087 (FM15) with USA 328-331 missions.								
180	8 October 2022; 23:05	F9 B5; B1060-14	Cape Canaveral, SLC‑40	Galaxy 33 & 34	7,350 kg (16,200 lb)	GTO	Intelsat	Success	Success (ASOG)
180	Northrop Grumman-built satellites for C-band clearing. At 7,350 kg (16,200 lb) total mass, this launch was one of the heaviest GTO SpaceX launches to date. This necessitated that the satellite be launched into a lower-energy orbit than a usual GTO, with its initial apogee at roughly 19,800 km (12,300 mi).								
181	15 October 2022; 05:22	F9 B5; B1069-3	Cape Canaveral, SLC‑40	Hotbird 13F	~4,500 kg (9,900 lb)	GTO	Eutelsat	Success	Success (JRTI)
181	15 October 2022; 05:22	F9 B5; B1069-3	Cape Canaveral, SLC‑40	Adidas Al Rihla balls	~1 kg (2.2 lb)	Suborbital (max 123 km (76 mi))	FIFA, Qatar Airways and SpaceX	Success	Success (JRTI)
181	Built by Airbus, the 4,500 kg (9,900 lb) satellite will maneuver to a 13° east orbit. The satellite reached a supersynchronous geostationary transfer orbit of 376 km × 55,950 km (234 mi × 34,766 mi) inclined at 27.1°. First stage B1069.3 included a hosted promotional payload by FIFA, that was a box powered by Starlink containing 2 Adidas Al Rihla (the Journey) balls, that were to be used in 2022 FIFA World Cup in Qatar for opening its Starlink office in Doha, Qatar. These match balls were launched and brought back by landing on the droneship, surviving the stresses of the booster. Later, they were taken out and shipped back to Qatar for the World Cup.								
182	20 October 2022; 14:50	F9 B5; B1062-10	Cape Canaveral, SLC‑40	Starlink: Group 4-36 (54 satellites)	~16,700 kg (36,800 lb)	LEO	SpaceX	Success	Success (ASOG)
182	Launch of 54 Starlink v1.5 satellites to a 540 km (340 mi) orbit at an inclination of 53.2° to expand internet constellation. The 48th Falcon 9 launch of the year beat the record launches in a year for a vehicle type held by Soyuz-U in 1979.								
183	28 October 2022; 01:14:10	F9 B5; B1063-8	Vandenberg, SLC‑4E	Starlink: Group 4-31 (53 satellites)	~16,400 kg (36,200 lb)	LEO	SpaceX	Success	Success (OCISLY)
183	Launch of 53 Starlink v1.5 satellites to a 540 km (340 mi) orbit at an inclination of 53.2° to expand internet constellation.								
FH 4	1 November 2022; 13:41	Falcon Heavy B5; B1066 (core)	Kennedy, LC‑39A	USSF-44 (Shepherd Demonstration & LDPE-2)	~3,750 kg (8,270 lb)	GEO	USSF, Millennium Space Systems and Lockheed Martin Space	Success	No attempt
FH 4	1 November 2022; 13:41	B1064-1 (side)	Kennedy, LC‑39A	USSF-44 (Shepherd Demonstration & LDPE-2)	~3,750 kg (8,270 lb)	GEO	USSF, Millennium Space Systems and Lockheed Martin Space	Success	Success (LZ‑1)
FH 4	1 November 2022; 13:41	B1065-1 (side)	Kennedy, LC‑39A	USSF-44 (Shepherd Demonstration & LDPE-2)	~3,750 kg (8,270 lb)	GEO	USSF, Millennium Space Systems and Lockheed Martin Space	Success	Success (LZ‑2)
FH 4	Classified payload totaling 3,750 kg (8,270 lb) using new side boosters and center core. The core lacked any fins and landing gear, as it was deliberately expended, underwent the most energetic reentry, and impacted at 1,300 km (810 mi) downrange, 8.3% further than STP-2 mission, while the two side boosters were recovered, marking the 150th and 151st successful landing respectively, and 21st landing at LZ-1 and 4th at LZ-2. It was the 50th launch of a Falcon-family rocket this year. The launch carried Shepherd Demonstration for the Space Force, intended to "test new technologies to enhance safe and responsible rendezvous and proximity operations", as well as the LDPE-2 space tug (with hosted payloads), Tetra-1, Alpine, LINUSS A1 and A2. Third flight featuring a Falcon long coast mission-extension kit, which equipped the second stage with a dark-painted band (for thermal control), extra COPVs for pressurization control, and additional TEA-TEB ignition fluid. The upgrades afforded the second stage with the endurance needed to inject the payloads directly into geosynchronous orbit six hours after launch.								
184	3 November 2022; 05:22	F9 B5; B1067-7	Cape Canaveral, SLC‑40	Hotbird 13G	~4,500 kg (9,900 lb)	GTO	Eutelsat	Success	Success (JRTI)
184	Built by Airbus, the 4,500 kg (9,900 lb) satellite will maneuver to a 13° east orbit. 50th Falcon 9 launch in 2022. The satellite reached a supersynchronous geostationary transfer orbit of 410 km × 57,503 km (255 mi × 35,731 mi) inclined at 27.7°.								
185	12 November 2022; 16:06	F9 B5; B1051-14	Cape Canaveral, SLC‑40	Galaxy 31 and Galaxy 32 (2 satellites)	~6,600 kg (14,600 lb)	GTO	Intelsat	Success	No attempt
185	Maxar Technologies built satellites for C-band clearing. Intelsat says that it paid SpaceX an additional fee to devote all of the Falcon 9 rocket's propellant to deliver the satellites into a higher orbit than the normal sub-synchronous orbit, given the payload's high total mass of 6,600 kg (14,600 lb). The Falcon 9 first-stage booster B1051, flying on its 14th flight, was expended, the first deliberately expended Falcon 9 booster since B1046 in January 2020. The satellites reached the supersynchronous geostationary transfer orbit of 283 km × 58,433 km inclined at 24.2°.								
186	23 November 2022; 02:57	F9 B5; B1049-11	Cape Canaveral, SLC‑40	Eutelsat 10B	5,500 kg (12,100 lb)	GTO	Eutelsat	Success	No attempt
186	Built by Thales Alenia Space, the satellite was launched into a geostationary transfer orbit targeting the 10° east GSO slot. The Falcon 9 first-stage booster B1049 flew its 11th mission and was expended into the Atlantic Ocean following the launch for the same reason as the previous Galaxy 31 and 32 mission's booster B1051. The satellite reached the supersynchronous geostationary transfer orbit of 261 km × 59,831 km inclined at 22.8°. B1049 flew with a Test/Spare Block 4 interstage on this flight since it donated its interstage to B1052 after its penultimate flight.								
187	26 November 2022; 19:20	F9 B5; B1076-1	Kennedy, LC‑39A	SpaceX CRS-26 (Dragon C211.1)	3,528 kg (7,778 lb)	LEO (ISS)	NASA (CRS)	Success	Success (JRTI)
187	Last of the six additional cargo missions NASA awarded in 2015 to SpaceX under the CRS-2 contract flown after the initial 20 missions of phase 1 were completed in 2020.								
188	8 December 2022; 22:27	F9 B5; B1069-4	Kennedy, LC‑39A	OneWeb Flight #15 / SpaceX Flight 1 (40 satellites)	6,000 kg (13,000 lb)	Polar LEO	OneWeb	Success	Success (LZ‑1)
188	Following the Russian invasion of Ukraine, OneWeb suspended launches on Soyuz rockets. In March 2022, OneWeb announced that they had signed an agreement with SpaceX to resume satellite launches. This was the first commercial (non-Starlink, non-NASA, non-government, non-crewed) satellite launch from LC-39A since Arabsat-6A in 2019, and the first on Falcon 9 since Es'hail 2 in 2018.								
189	11 December 2022; 07:38	F9 B5; B1073-5	Cape Canaveral, SLC‑40	Hakuto-R Mission 1 Emirates Lunar Mission; Lunar Flashlight	~1,000 kg (2,200 lb)	Ballistic lunar transfer (BLT)	ispace MBRSC; JAXA; NASA	Success	Success (LZ‑2)
189	ispace's Hakuto-R (for Reboot) lunar lander is derived from the Hakuto project that was one of the defunct Google Lunar X Prize contestants. Hakuto-R carries the Rashid rover, built by MBRSC and JAXA built Transformable Lunar Robot. A separate 2023, Hakuto-R mission will include a Japanese rover. The Canadian Space Agency has sponsored three private payloads with ispace: Mission Control Space Services will have a computer fly on the Rashid rover to test artificial intelligence algorithms, Canadensys Aerospace Corporation is arranging a 360-degree camera to fly, and NGC Aerospace Ltd will take pictures from orbit to compare them to maps in order to test a navigation system. Lunar Flashlight is a JPL-developed CubeSat that will scan for water ice deposits on the Moon; it was remanifested as a secondary payload after missing its integration window on the Artemis 1 launch. First Falcon 9 booster landing on LZ-2.								
190	16 December 2022; 11:46	F9 B5; B1071-6	Vandenberg, SLC‑4E	Surface Water and Ocean Topography (SWOT)	~2,200 kg (4,900 lb)	LEO	NASA/CNES	Success	Success (LZ‑4)
190	American–European satellite intended to measure the surface altitude of water bodies with centimeter-level precision.								
191	16 December 2022; 22:48	F9 B5; B1067-8	Cape Canaveral, SLC‑40	O3b mPOWER 1 & 2	~4,100 kg (9,000 lb)	MEO	SES	Success	Success (ASOG)
191	In September 2019, SES signed a contract to launch the first part of their seven MEO satellites for its O3b low-latency, high-performance connectivity services.								
192	17 December 2022; 21:32	F9 B5; B1058-15	Kennedy, LC‑39A	Starlink: Group 4-37 (54 satellites)	~16,700 kg (36,800 lb)	LEO	SpaceX	Success	Success (JRTI)
192	Launch of 54 Starlink v1.5 satellites to a 540 km (340 mi) orbit at an inclination of 53.2° to expand internet constellation. B1058 became the first booster to be launched and recovered fifteen times, exceeding its prior record.								
193	28 December 2022; 09:34	F9 B5; B1062-11	Cape Canaveral, SLC‑40	Starlink: Group 5-1 (54 satellites)	~16,700 kg (36,800 lb)	LEO	SpaceX	Success	Success (ASOG)
193	Launch of 54 Starlink v1.5 satellites to a 530 km (330 mi) orbit at an inclination of 43° to expand internet constellation.								
194	30 December 2022; 07:38	F9 B5; B1061-11	Vandenberg, SLC‑4E	EROS-C3	~400 kg (880 lb)	Retrograde LEO	ImageSat International	Success	Success (LZ‑4)
194	Israeli electro-optical Earth observation satellite based on the OPTSAT-3000 satellite. This was the first SpaceX launch to a low-inclination retrograde orbit, previous retrograde orbits having been polar or Sun-synchronous. It targeting an ~140° inclination orbit. This launch marked the first time SpaceX completed 7 launches in a calendar month and the final rocket launch of 2022. SpaceX's Falcon family thus equaled the yearly world record for most successful launches by any rocket family, first set by the R-7 family in 1980 after this launch. B1061 became the only booster to land on all of SpaceX's different landing zones and drone ships except the rarely used LZ-2.								

== Notable launches ==
=== First crewed flights ===
SpaceX held a successful launch of the first commercial orbital human space flight on 30 May 2020, crewed with NASA astronauts Doug Hurley and Bob Behnken. Both astronauts focused on conducting tests on the Crew Dragon capsule. Crew Dragon successfully returned to Earth, splashing down in the Gulf of Mexico on 2 August 2020.

=== Reuse of the first stage ===
SpaceX has developed a program to reuse the first-stage booster, setting multiple booster reflight records:

- B1048 was the first booster to be recovered four times on 11 November 2019, and the first to perform a fifth flight on 18 March 2020, but the booster was lost during re-entry.
- B1049 was the first booster to be recovered five times on 4 June 2020, six times on 18 August 2020, and seven times on 25 November 2020.
- B1051 became the first booster to be recovered eight times on 20 January 2021, nine times on 14 March 2021, and ten times on 9 May 2021, achieving one of SpaceX's milestone goals for reuse. It then became the first booster to be recovered eleven times on 18 December 2021, and twelve times on 19 March 2022.
- B1060 became the first booster to be recovered 13 times on 17 June 2022.
- B1058 became the first booster to be recovered 14 times on 11 September 2022, 15 times on 17 December 2022.
- B1069 launched and returned a hosted box containing two FIFA 2022 World Cup Adidas Al Rihla on 15 October 2022 for a sub-orbital flight, the first payload on a Falcon 9 booster.
- B1061 became the only booster on 30 December 2022 to launch from all SpaceX's different launch sites and on all of SpaceX's different landing zones and drone ships (except rarely used LZ-2 that is located nearby LZ-1).

== See also ==
- List of Falcon 1 launches
- List of Falcon 9 first-stage boosters
- List of SpaceX Dragon 1 missions
- List of SpaceX Dragon 2 missions
- List of Starlink and Starshield launches
- List of Starship launches
