= Falcon 9 B1058 =

Falcon 9 Block 5 first-stage booster

Falcon 9 booster B1058 (United States)

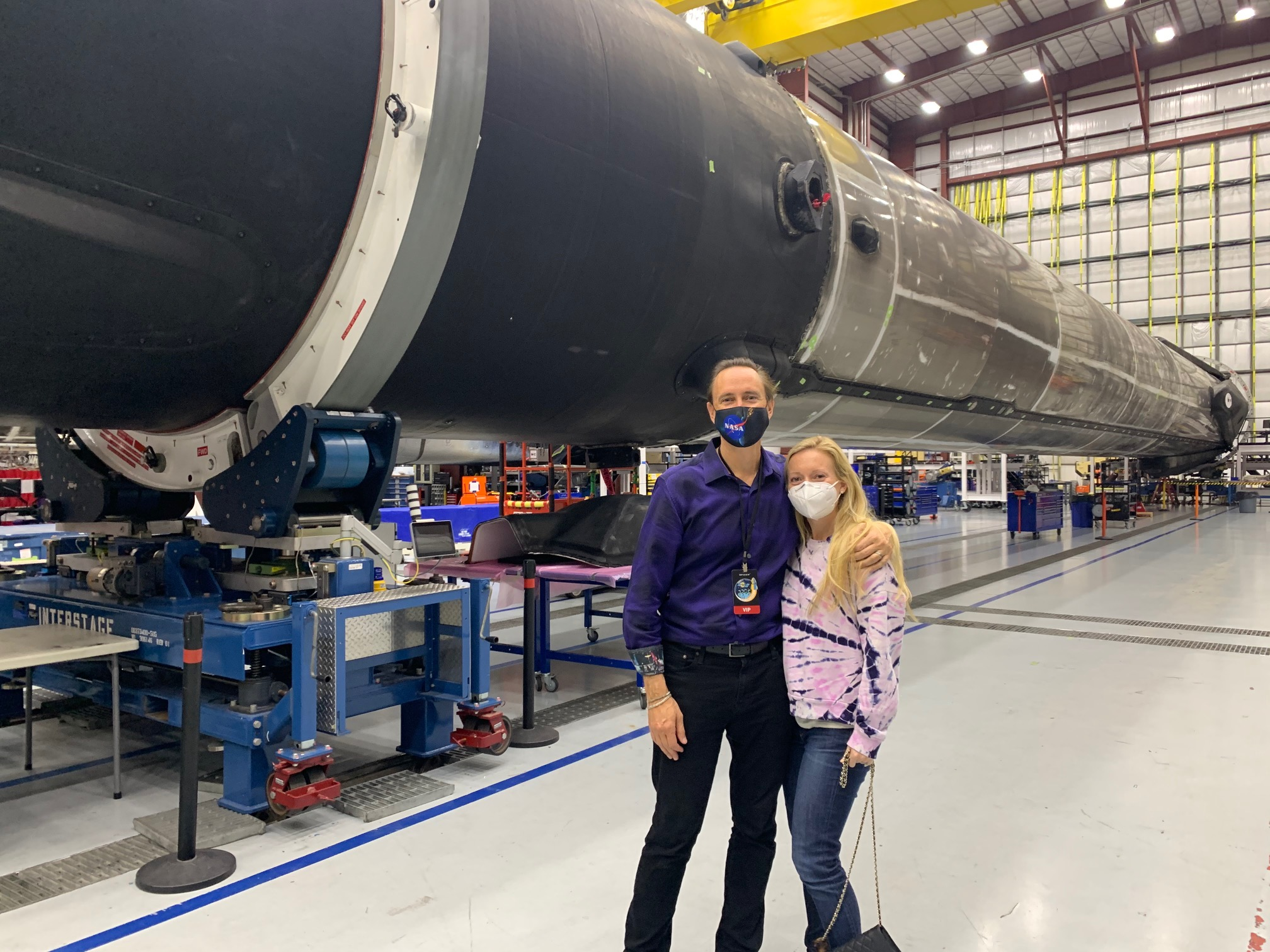
- B1058 in SpaceX processing facility

General information
- Type: Falcon 9 first stage booster
- National origin: United States
- Manufacturer: SpaceX
- Status: Destroyed during recovery
- Construction number: B1058
- Flights: 19

History
- First flight: 30 May 2020 (Demo-2)
- Last flight: 23 December 2023 (Starlink 6–32)

Falcon 9 booster B1058 was a reusable Falcon 9 Block 5 first-stage booster manufactured by SpaceX. B1058 was the first Falcon 9 booster to fly fourteen, fifteen, sixteen, seventeen, eighteen and nineteen times and broke a turnaround record on its later flights. Its first flight was for Crew Dragon Demo-2, on 30 May 2020, the first crewed orbital spaceflight by a private company. The booster was the first and only Falcon 9 booster to feature NASA's worm logo and meatball insignia, the former of which was reintroduced after last being used in 1992. The booster was destroyed several days after successfully landing on the autonomous spaceport drone ship Just Read the Instructions on 23 December 2023. B1058 toppled over as the drone ship sailed toward Port Canaveral in rough seas.

While in service, B1058 had an average turnaround time of 72 days with a record turnaround of 27 days and 8 hours. For its 19 flights, it held the Guinness World Record of most missions flown by a rocket first stage, until B1062 surpassed it by completing its 20th flight on 13 April 2024.

== Flight history ==
=== First flight ===
B1058 entered service on May 30, 2020 launching Demo-2 from LC-39A to the International Space Station with astronauts Bob Behnken and Doug Hurley. It was the first crewed orbital spaceflight launched from the United States since the final Space Shuttle mission, and the first crewed flight test of Dragon 2. This was the first time US astronauts launched using a privately owned rocket and the first US crewed mission to the ISS in 9 years. B1058 landed aboard the autonomous spaceport drone ship Of Course I Still Love You approximately eight and a half minutes after launch.

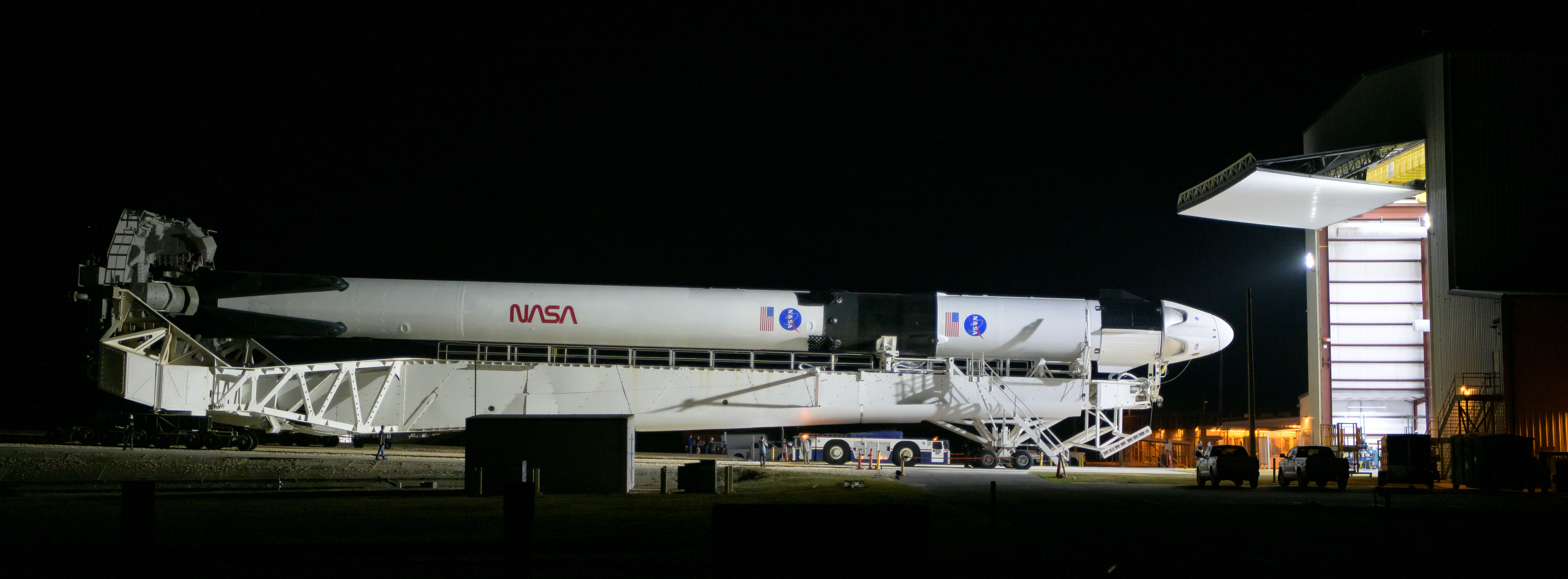
Falcon 9 B1058 and Dragon rolling out to the launch pad, bearing the NASA "worm" logo

=== Second flight ===
On July 20, 2020, B1058 launched again with the ANASIS-II payload, a military satellite for South Korea. This booster launched at SLC-40 towards a GTO orbit and landed successfully at the Just Read the Instructions droneship. Both fairing halves were recovered for the first time, and B1058 set a new turnaround record which was just 51 days.

=== Third flight ===
B1058 made its third flight from LC-39A on October 6, 2020 carrying 60 Starlink satellites to Low Earth orbit. This was B1058's first mission for Starlink. About eight minutes after launch, B1058 landed on Of Course I Still Love You – completing its mission. Also, by completing this launch, B1058 had achieved the shortest time it had reached 3 flights, clocking in at 129 days, beating B1046 by 77 days.

=== Fourth flight ===
B1058 carried SpaceX CRS-21 and the first cargo Dragon 2 from LC-39A to the International Space Station. The old SpaceX Dragon 1 needed the Canadarm 2 to help berth it to a US-derived module, but B1058 was flying the independent version of Dragon, which means that it could dock without the use of a robotic arm. B1058 completed a partial boost-back burn towards the Of Course I Still Love You drone ship, 8 minutes after launch.

=== Fifth flight ===
SpaceX announced that it would begin launching small satellites using its smallsat rideshare program, Transporter. B1058 was the first to service this type of mission targeting a 525 km (326 mi) altitude Sun-synchronous orbit. The launch deployed a record 143 satellites, consisting of 120 CubeSats, 11 microsatellites, 10 Starlinks, and 2 transfer stages. In addition, 2 hosted payloads and 1 non-separating dummy satellite were launched. By this launch, SpaceX broke the record held by India, which launched 104 satellites in 2017. These include SpaceBEE (x 36), Lemur-2 (x 8), ICEYE (x 3), UVSQ-SAT, ELaNa 35 (PTD-1), and Kepler nanosats (x 8). D-Orbit ION Satellite Carrier and 10 Starlink satellites made for testing optical laser inter-satellite links placed in a polar orbit and 2 of 15 payloads remained attached to SHERPA-FX1. Exolaunch deployed several small satellites and cubesats via their own deployment mechanisms. First flight of a Falcon 9 with a SHERPA-FX transfer stage called SHERPA-FX1. B1058 launched from SLC-40 and landed successfully on the OCISLY droneship.

=== Sixth flight ===
B1058 launched the twentieth operational launch of Starlink satellites, again 60 in number, bringing the total to 1,265 (including prototypes) launched Starlink satellites. B1058 launched from SLC-40 and landed successfully on the JRTI droneship.

=== Seventh flight ===
B1058 launched the 23rd operational launch of Starlink satellites, bringing the total to 1,385 launched Starlink satellites (including prototype). This launch featured the fastest for B1058 and second fastest overall booster turnaround time at 27 days and 8 hours (after Starlink 18 with B1060.5, which was 4 hours faster). B1058 launched from SLC-40 and landed successfully on the OCISLY droneship.

=== Eighth flight ===
Rideshare launch with a targeted orbit at 569x582, significantly higher than typical Starlink launches, to allow for needs of the rideshare payloads. Fairing "wet recovery" done by contracted recovery vessel Shelia Bordelon for the last time. B1058 launched from LC-39A and landed successfully on the OCISLY droneship.

=== Ninth flight ===
First East Coast Starlink launch after the v1.0 L28 launch which completed the first shell of the Starlink network located at 540 km altitude. Fairing "wet recovery" was attempted by SpaceX multipurpose ship, Bob for the first time, and both fairing halves were retrieved from water. B1058 launched from SLC-40 and landed successfully on the JRTI droneship.

=== Tenth flight ===
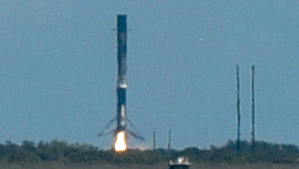
B1058 landing back at LZ-1 during its 10th mission

B1058 launched the third dedicated SmallSat Rideshare mission to Sun-synchronous orbit. A total of 105 payloads including: Planet Labs SuperDoves (×44), and some of the customer payloads on SpaceFlight's SXRS-6 mission. In addition, four secret satellites, likely test satellites built by SpaceX based on the Starshield bus (based on Starlink Block v1.5 or v2.0 technology), were also deployed for the US army. Their purpose has not been revealed, but is likely either technical demonstration, communications, earth observation or signals intelligence. In 2020, SpaceX had won a US$149 million contract for developing and launching missile tracking satellites based on the Starlink architecture. B1058 launched from SLC-40 and landed successfully on SpaceX Landing Zone 1.

=== Eleventh flight ===
The eleventh mission of B1058 was the first Group 4 mission to feature 2 upper stage burns like v1.0 Starlink launches, with deployment of the 46 satellites approximately 1 hour after lift-off into a higher circular orbit. This is aimed at reducing the risk of high drag that caused 38 of the Group 4–7 satellites to fail reaching their intended orbits, and instead, reenter shortly after launch. B1058 launched from SLC-40 and landed successfully on the A Shortfall of Gravitas droneship.

=== Twelfth flight ===
A regular East Coast Starlink network launch to a 540 km circular orbit at an inclination of 53.2°. B1058 launched from LC-39A and landed successfully on the ASOG droneship.

=== Thirteenth flight ===
A regular East Coast Starlink network launch to a 540 km circular orbit at an inclination of 53.2°. B1058 launched from SLC-40 and landed successfully on the JRTI droneship.

=== Fourteenth flight ===
B1058 launched a regular East Coast Starlink network launch to a 540 km circular orbit at an inclination of 53.2°. Bluewalker-3 is a rideshare mission launched to 513 km altitude 53° inclination. In addition to this, the 2nd stage first executed two burns to deploy the Bluewalker 3, followed by executing two more burns to deploy the Starlinks to a 330 km altitude 53.2° inclination orbit, concluding with deorbit burn, which made it one of the most complex F9 missions up to date. On 11 September 2022, it flew for the 14th time and became the first booster to be recovered 14 times. B1058 launched from LC-39A and landed successfully on the ASOG droneship.

=== Fifteenth flight ===
On another record breaking 15th flight for the first time for SpaceX, B1058 launched a regular East Coast Starlink network launch to a 540 km circular orbit at an inclination of 53.2°. B1058 launched from LC-39A and landed successfully on the JRTI droneship.

=== Certification for further flights ===
Until then, Block 5 boosters were only certified for 15 launches. A "deep-dive" examination has been performed on B1058 and B1060 after their 15th flight, and SpaceX certified Falcon 9 boosters for 20 missions.

=== Sixteenth flight ===
On 10 July 2023, B1058 launched a regular East Coast v2 mini Starlink launch to their Generation 2 network. B1058 was the first booster to launch and land 16 times, pushing the envelope and surpassing its previous record, which was 15 flights. B1058 launched from SLC-40 and landed successfully on the JRTI droneship.

=== Seventeenth flight ===
B1058 launched another East Coast v2 mini Starlink launch to their Generation 2 network. SpaceX set a new record using the same booster for the 17th time. B1058 launched from SLC-40 and landed successfully on the ASOG droneship.

=== Eighteenth flight ===
B1058 launched another East Coast v2 mini Starlink launch to their Generation 2 network. SpaceX set a new record using the same booster for the 18th time. B1058 launched from SLC-40 and landed successfully on the ASOG droneship.

=== Nineteenth and final flight ===
B1058 launched another East Coast v2 mini Starlink launch to their Generation 2 network. SpaceX set a new record using the same booster for the 19th time. It was the last flight of B1058. B1058 launched from SLC-40 and landed successfully on the JRTI droneship.

=== Demise ===
Despite successfully landing after its nineteenth flight, B1058 tipped over during transit due to rough seas and high winds. SpaceX has already equipped newer Falcon boosters with upgraded landing legs that have the capability to self-level and mitigate this type of issue.

This was the second instance of a booster toppling over during transit due to weather. The first time that this occurred was in April 2019, when Falcon Heavy core booster B1055 suffered the same fate.

SpaceX intends on salvaging and inspecting the engines to learn about how they were affected by flying nineteen times, which may produce learnings for the rest of the Falcon 9 fleet. Doug Hurley suggested that the remnants of the booster (as well as the Endeavour capsule, after its retirement) would be suitable for museum display as a historically significant artifact in the history of crewed spaceflight.

== Launches ==
Flight #	Launch date (UTC)	Mission #	Payload	Pictures	Launch pad	Landing location	Notes
1	May 30, 2020	85	Dragon C206 Endeavour (Demo-2)		LC-39A	Of Course I Still Love You	Carried astronauts Bob Behnken and Doug Hurley to the International Space Station. First fight of the Dragon 2 crew capsule and this booster.
2	July 20, 2020	89	ANASIS-II		SLC-40	Just Read the Instructions	A military satellite for South Korea. Also the first time that both recovery ships caught the fairing and a new turnaround record for B1058.
3	October 6, 2020	94	Starlink × 60 (v1.0 L12)		LC-39A	Of Course I Still Love You	First Starlink mission for B1058. B1058 held a new record for the shortest time a booster reached 3 flights which was 129 days, 77 days less than B1046.
4	December 6, 2020	101	Dragon C208 (CRS-21)		SLC-40	Of Course I Still Love You	First mission of the cargo Dragon 2 capsule. Carried Nanoracks Bishop Airlock to the International Space Station. 100th successful launch of a Falcon 9.
5	January 24, 2021	106	Transporter-1		SLC-40	Of Course I Still Love You	Dedicated 143 satellites rideshare mission.
6	March 11, 2021	110	Starlink × 60 (v1.0 L20)		SLC-40	Just Read the Instructions	Starlink mission.
7	April 7, 2021	113	Starlink × 60 (v1.0 L23)		SLC-40	Of Course I Still Love You	Starlink mission. This launch featured the fastest for B1058 and second fastest overall booster turnaround time at 27 days and 8 hours (after Starlink 18 with B1060.5, which was 4 hours faster).
8	May 15, 2021	118	Starlink × 60 (v1.0 L26)		LC-39A	Of Course I Still Love You	Starlink mission.
9	November 13, 2021	128	Starlink × 53 (Group 4-1)		SLC-40	Just Read the Instructions	Starlink mission.
10	January 13, 2022	136	Transporter-3		SLC-40	SpaceX Landing Zone 1	Dedicated 105 satellites rideshare mission. First ground pad landing of this booster.
11	February 21, 2022	141	Starlink x 46 (Group 4–8)		SLC-40	A Shortfall of Gravitas	Starlink Mission.
12	May 6, 2022	152	Starlink x 53 (Group 4–17)		LC-39A	A Shortfall of Gravitas	Starlink mission.
13	July 7, 2022	162	Starlink x 53 (Group 4–21)		SLC-40	Just Read the Instructions	Starlink mission.
14	September 11, 2022	175	Starlink x 34 (Group 4-2) + BlueWalker 3		LC-39A	A Shortfall of Gravitas	Starlink mission with BlueWalker as rideshare. First booster with 14 flights.
15	December 17, 2022	192	Starlink x 54 (Group 4–37)		LC-39A	Just Read the Instructions	Starlink mission. First booster with 15 flights.
16	July 10, 2023	238	Starlink v2 x 22 (Group 6-5)		SLC-40	Just Read the Instructions	Starlink mission. First booster with 16 flights.
17	September 20, 2023	257	Starlink v2 × 22 (Group 6–17)		SLC-40	A Shortfall of Gravitas	Starlink mission. First booster with 17 flights.
18	November 4, 2023	269	Starlink v2 × 22 (Group 6–27)		SLC-40	A Shortfall of Gravitas	Starlink mission. First booster with 18 flights.
19	December 23, 2023	283	Starlink v2 × 23 (Group 6–32)		SLC-40	Just Read the Instructions (Note: Despite making a successful landing, de-tanking and heading back home, the stage fell over on the drone ship platform during transit back to Cape Canaveral in rough seas, high winds and waves. This is still considered a successful landing as the stage damage occurred while in transport.)	Starlink mission. First booster with 19 flights. Destroyed after tipping over the droneship during recovery due to high winds and waves
