= USA-304 =

GPS III satellite

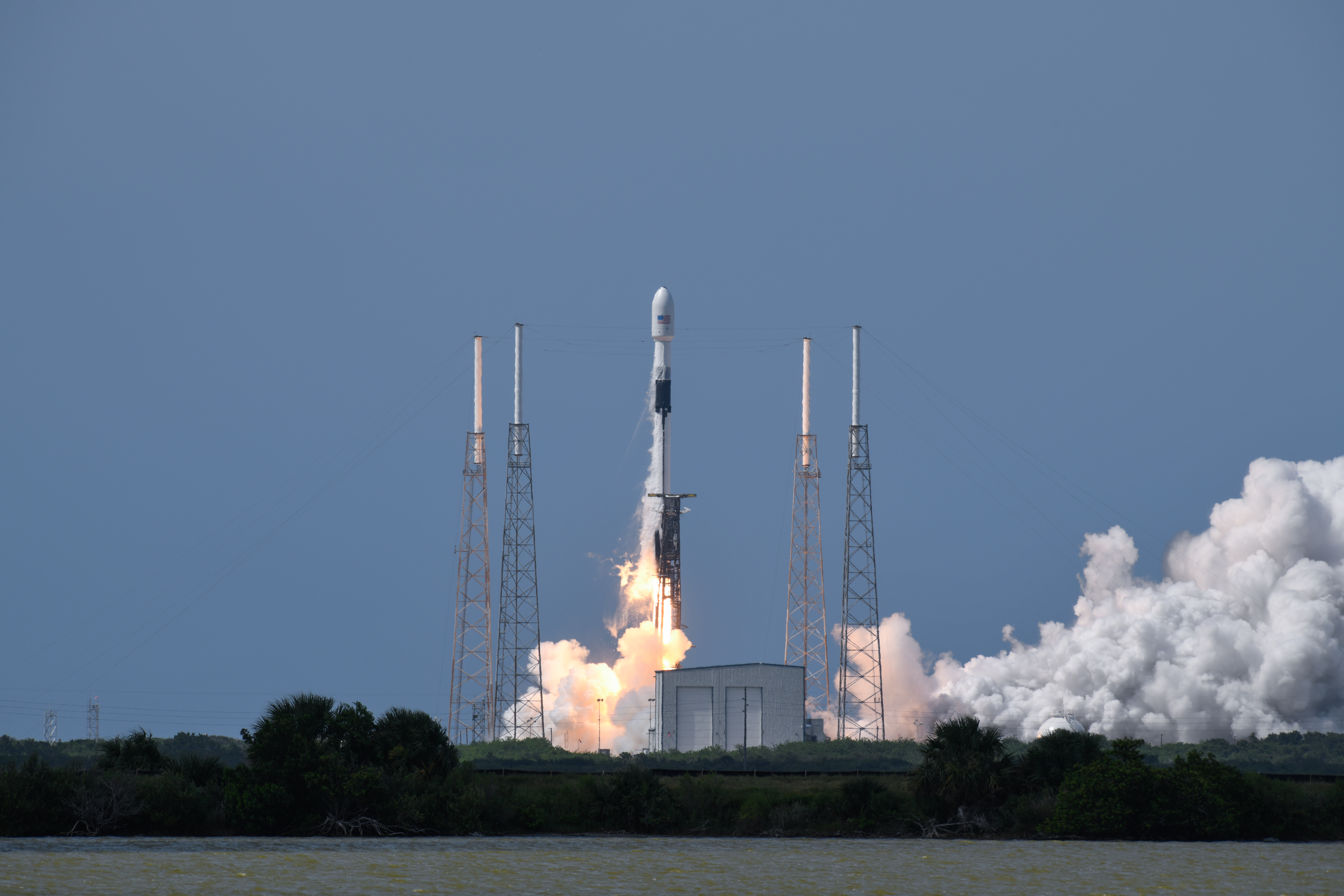
- Launch of GPS-III 03
- Names: Navstar 79; GPS-III SV03; Matthew Henson
- Mission type: Navigation
- Operator: USAF
- COSPAR ID: 2020-41A
- SATCAT no.: 45854
- Mission duration: 15 years (planned)

Spacecraft properties
- Spacecraft: GPS-III SV03
- Spacecraft type: GPS Block III
- Bus: A2100M
- Manufacturer: Lockheed Martin
- Launch mass: 4311 kg

Start of mission
- Launch date: 30 June 2020, 20:40 UTC
- Rocket: Falcon 9 Block 5 (F9-088)
- Launch site: Cape Canaveral, SLC-40
- Contractor: SpaceX

Orbital parameters
- Reference system: Geocentric orbit
- Regime: Medium Earth orbit (Semi-synchronous orbit)
- Perigee altitude: 20,164 km (12,529 mi)
- Apogee altitude: 20,214 km (12,560 mi)
- Inclination: 55.2°
- Period: 718.0 minutes

USA-304, also known as GPS-III SV03 or Matthew Henson, (Note: originally named Columbus) is a United States navigation satellite which forms part of the Global Positioning System. It was the third GPS Block III satellite to be launched.

== Satellite ==
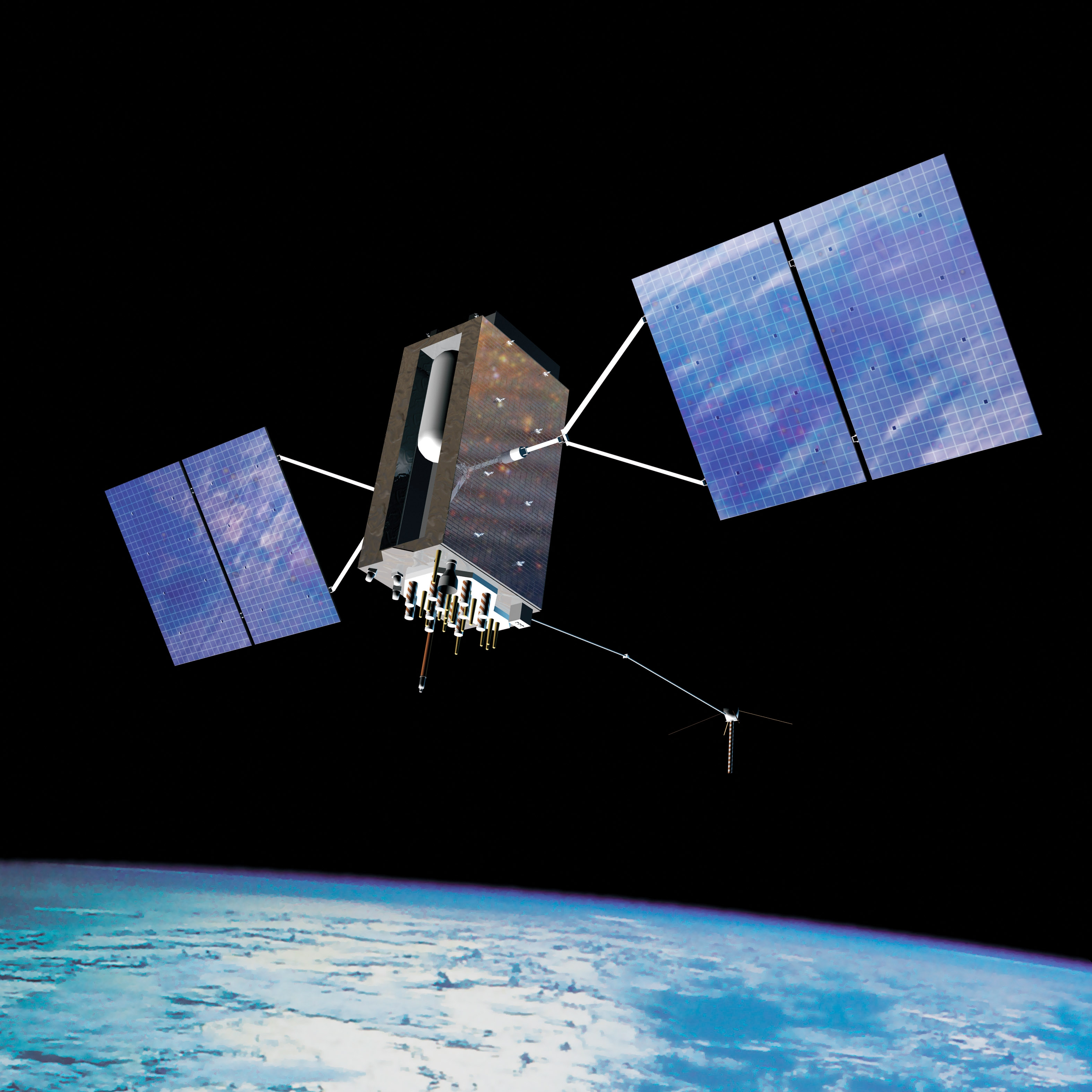
Artist's rendering of GPS-III satellite in orbit

SV03 is the third GPS Block III satellite to be launched. Ordered in 2008, launch was pushed back several times to 2020 due to delays with the first and second satellites.

The spacecraft is built on the Lockheed Martin A2100 satellite bus, and weighs in at 4,311 kg (9,504 lb).

== Launch ==
USA-304 was launched by SpaceX on 30 June 2020 at 20:10 UTC atop Falcon 9 booster B1060. The launch took place from SLC-40 of the Cape Canaveral Air Force Station, and placed USA-304 directly into semi-synchronous orbit. About eight minutes after launch, Falcon 9 B1060 successfully landed on Just Read the Instructions.

== Orbit ==
As of 2021, USA-304 was in a 55.2 degree inclination orbit with a perigee of 20,164 kilometers (12,529 mi) and an apogee of 20,214 km (12,560 mi).

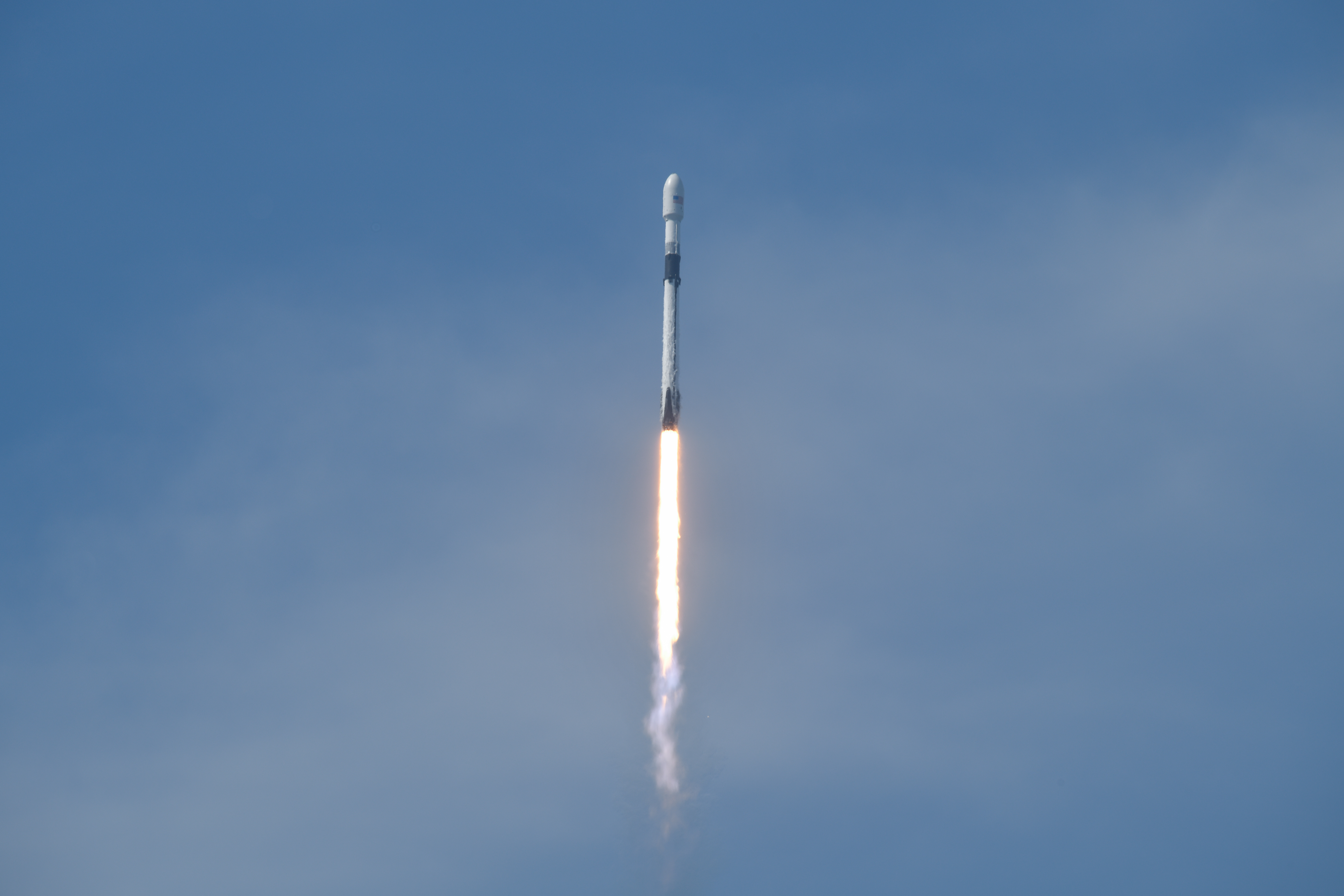
GPS-III SV03 is launched on a Falcon 9
