= BlackSky Technology Inc. =

Satellite Earth observation company BlackSky

BlackSky Technology Inc. (NYSE: BKSY) is an American company that provides geospatial intelligence services, such as satellite imagery and data analytics. The company is headquartered in Herndon, Virginia, and operates some small satellites in low Earth orbit. It serves government and commercial customers through imagery products and a software platform called BlackSky Spectra.

== History ==
=== Founding and early development (2013–2016) ===
BlackSky was founded in 2013 as a subsidiary of Spaceflight Industries to develop on-demand satellite imagery services. In 2015, the company announced plans for a constellation of 60 satellites intended to provide imagery of any location on Earth within 90 minutes.

The company's first satellite, BlackSky Pathfinder-1, was launched on September 26, 2016, aboard an Indian Space Research Organisation (ISRO) PSLV rocket. The 44-kilogram demonstration satellite carried imaging payloads from Harris Corporation.

=== Constellation development (2017–2021) ===
In September 2017, BlackSky and Thales Alenia Space established LeoStella LLC, a satellite manufacturing joint venture based in Tukwila, Washington. LeoStella was contracted to build 20 satellites for BlackSky's initial operational constellation.

Between 2018 and 2021, BlackSky launched multiple second-generation (Gen-2) satellites via Rocket Lab, SpaceX, and ISRO. By December 2021, the company had launched 12 Gen-2 satellites, including six within a 30-day period across three missions.

=== Public listing (2021) ===
On February 18, 2021, BlackSky announced a definitive merger agreement with Osprey Technology Acquisition Corp., a special purpose acquisition company (SPAC). The transaction valued the combined entity at approximately $1.5 billion and included $283 million in gross proceeds — $103 million from Osprey's trust and $180 million in PIPE financing from investors including Tiger Global Management, Mithril Capital, and Hedosophia.

The merger closed on September 9, 2021, and BlackSky began trading on the New York Stock Exchange under the ticker symbol "BKSY" on September 10, 2021.

=== Gen-3 constellation (2024–present) ===
In November 2024, BlackSky acquired Thales Alenia Space's stake in LeoStella LLC, taking full ownership of the satellite manufacturing venture.

In February 2025, BlackSky launched its first third-generation (Gen-3) satellite on Rocket Lab's Electron rocket. Gen-3 satellites are designed to capture imagery at 35-centimeter resolution, compared to approximately 1-meter resolution for the Gen-2 constellation.

== Technology ==
=== Satellite constellation ===
BlackSky operates a constellation of small satellites in low Earth orbit. Gen-2 satellites offer approximately 1-meter resolution, while Gen-3 satellites are designed for 35-centimeter resolution. The satellites use steam-powered propulsion systems supplied by Bradford Space and are designed for three-year operational lifespans.

=== BlackSky Spectra platform ===
BlackSky Spectra is the company's software platform for satellite tasking and imagery analytics. The platform processes imagery from BlackSky's satellites as well as third-party sources, and includes automated object detection, change detection, and monitoring capabilities delivered via a web interface or API.

=== AI and analytics programs ===
BlackSky has participated in the Intelligence Advanced Research Projects Activity (IARPA) Space-based Machine Automated Recognition Technique (SMART) program, which focuses on developing automated change-detection tools using satellite imagery. In January 2024, the company was selected to advance to Phase III of the program.

== Operations ==
BlackSky serves government and commercial customers globally. Government customers include the United States Army, National Geospatial-Intelligence Agency (NGA), Defense Innovation Unit (DIU), and various international defense agencies.

In October 2024, the NGA awarded BlackSky a position on the Luno A contract, a five-year, multi-award indefinite-delivery, indefinite-quantity vehicle worth up to $290 million across all awardees.

Commercial applications of BlackSky's services have included supply chain monitoring, infrastructure observation, and disaster response.

== See also ==
- Remote sensing
