= ANASIS-II =

South Korean communication satellite

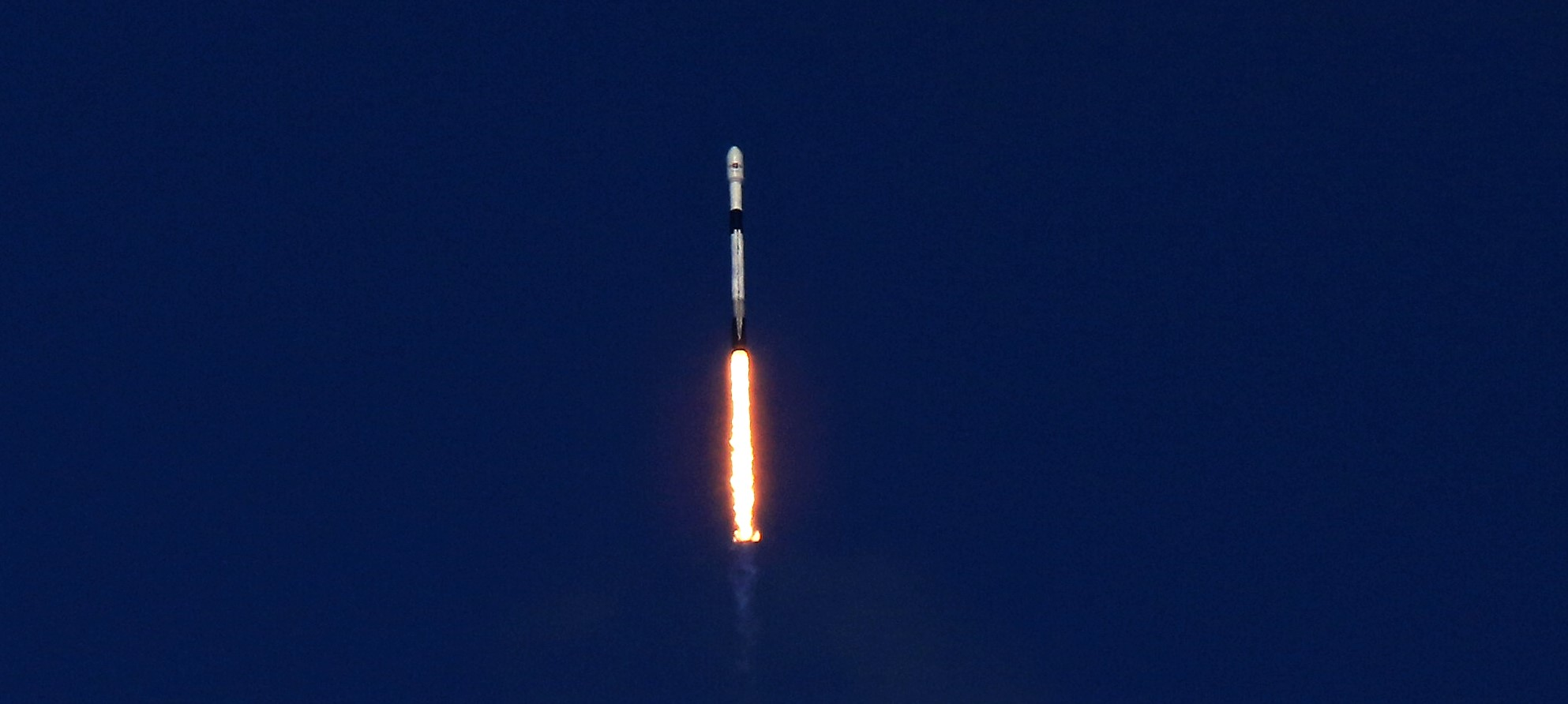
- ANASIS-II mission (2020)
- Names: Koreasat 116; KMilSatCom 1
- Mission type: Military Communications
- Operator: Agency for Defense Development (ADD)
- COSPAR ID: 2020-048A
- SATCAT no.: 45920
- Mission duration: 15 years

Spacecraft properties
- Bus: Eurostar E3000
- Manufacturer: Airbus Defence and Space
- Launch mass: 5000-6000 kg
- Power: 15 kW

Start of mission
- Launch date: 20 July 2020, 21:30 UTC
- Rocket: Falcon 9 Block 5 B1058-2
- Launch site: Cape Canaveral, SLC-40
- Contractor: SpaceX

Orbital parameters
- Reference system: Geocentric orbit
- Regime: Geostationary orbit
- Longitude: 116.2° E

ANASIS-II (Army Navy Air Force Satellite Information System-II), formerly called "KMilSatCom 1", is a South Korean military/government communications satellite which was launched on 20 July 2020. It was built by Airbus Defence and Space as part of an offset package into the purchase of 40 F-35 combat aircraft.

== Launch ==
The payload was launched aboard a reused 1st stage booster, B1058 featuring the NASA "worm" logo, which previously launched SpaceX DM-2. After stage separation it successfully landed aboard the drone ship Just Read the Instructions in the Atlantic Ocean. Both fairing halves were successfully caught by recovery ships Ms. Tree and Ms. Chief, making it the first successful catch attempt in which both halves were caught for reuse.

== Operation ==
In October 2020, the Chosun Ilbo reported that South Korean Armed Forces had not developed the ground segment of ANASIS-II yet. It is likely that ANASIS-II will not be utilized for more than a year.

== See also ==
- Koreasat 5 also known as ANASIS-I which is a communication satellite for military use as well as for commercial use.
