= NASA Headquarters =

Headquarters of NASA in Washington, D.C.

Mary W. Jackson NASA Headquarters

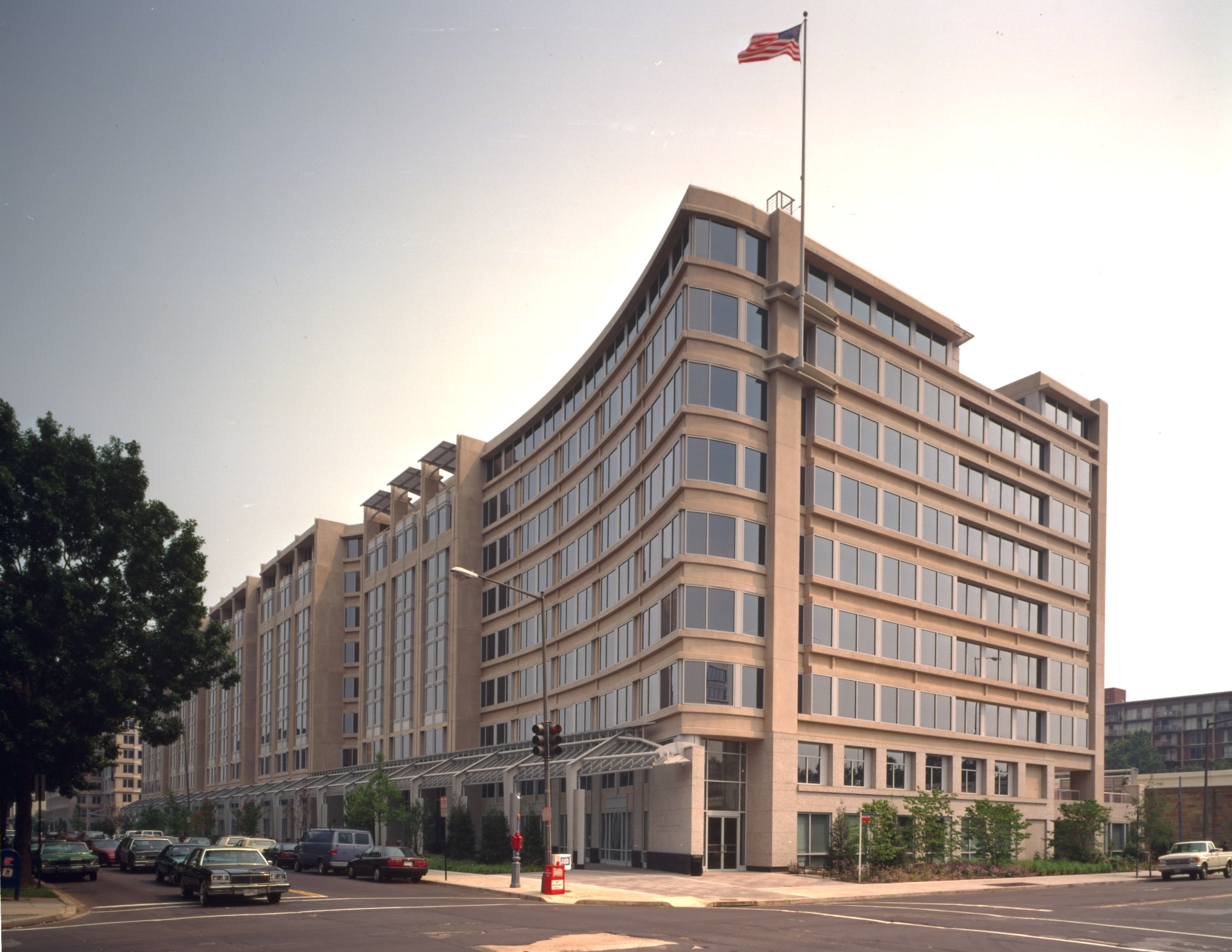
- Interactive map of the Mary W. Jackson NASA Headquarters area
- Alternative names: Two Independence Square

General information
- Type: Government offices Commercial offices
- Location: 300 E Street SW; Washington, D.C.
- Coordinates: 38°52′59″N 77°00′59″W
- Named for: Mary W. Jackson
- Completed: 1992
- Owner: Hana Asset Management

Technical details
- Floor count: 9
- Floor area: 606,000 sq ft (56,300 m^{2})

Design and construction
- Architects: Evans Heintges Architects; Kohn Pedersen Fox
- Developer: Boston Properties

Other information
- Public transit: Federal Center SW

The Mary W. Jackson NASA Headquarters is a building at 300 E Street SW in Washington, D.C. that houses NASA leadership, who provide overall guidance and direction to the National Aeronautics and Space Administration (NASA), a U.S. government executive branch agency led by the NASA administrator. Ten field centers and a variety of installations around the country conduct the agency's day-to-day work.

The James E. Webb Memorial Auditorium, named for NASA's second administrator, James E. Webb, hosts agency news conferences and NASA Social events. A lending library, the history office, archives, production facilities for NASA TV, and a NASA gift shop are also located in the building.

The building opened in 1992 as Two Independence Square as part of the two-building Independence Square complex, which was designed by Kohn Pedersen Fox. It is owned by South Korean investment firm Hana Asset Management and leased to NASA through 2028.

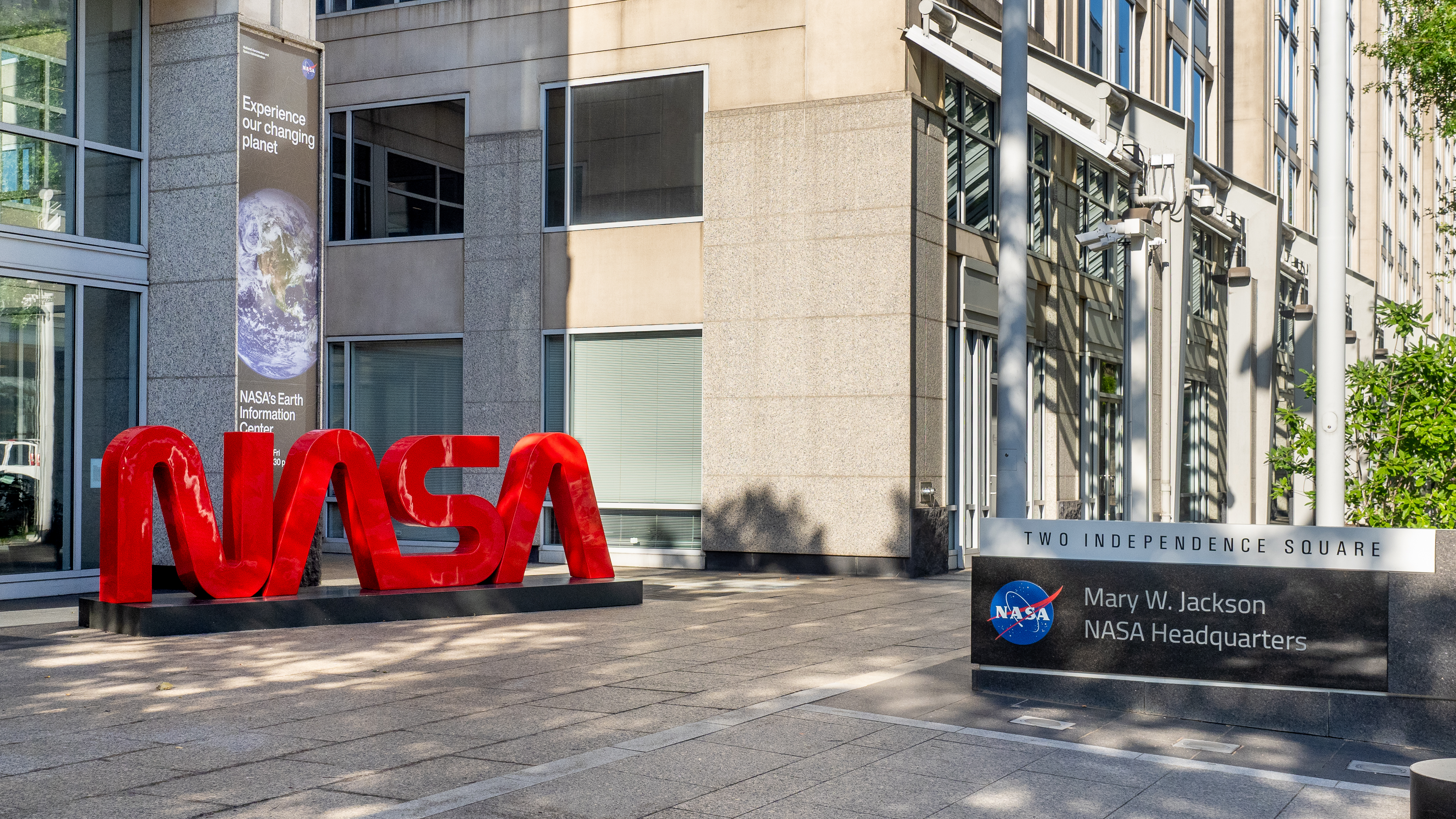
The Mary W. Jackson NASA Headquarters sign and the NASA worm insignia

On June 12, 2019, the street in front of the building was given the honorary name Hidden Figures Way in honor of some of NASA's Black women mathematicians—Katherine Johnson, Dorothy Vaughan, and Mary W. Jackson—who were central figures in the 2016 book Hidden Figures and its film adaptation. On June 24, 2020, NASA administrator Jim Bridenstine announced that the headquarters building had been renamed the Mary W. Jackson NASA Headquarters, after NASA's first Black woman engineer. A ceremony officially renaming the building was held on February 26, 2021.

In 2023, NASA opened an exhibit in the lobby, marking the first time the agency welcomed the public into the building. The Earth Information Center exhibit shows how NASA views Earth from space, tracking patterns in air temperature and quality, climate, water levels, and ecosystems, and how these data can help humans understand and address climate change. The entrance to the exhibit also features a large NASA worm sculpture, dedicated in honor of its designers, Bruce Blackburn and Richard Danne, as well as NASA's former art director Robert Schulman.

NASA's lease on the building expires in August 2028, and the agency has expressed that it plans to move out of the building, looking for a smaller space of approximately 375,000 to 525,000 square feet (34,800 to 48,800 m^{2}).

== Gallery ==
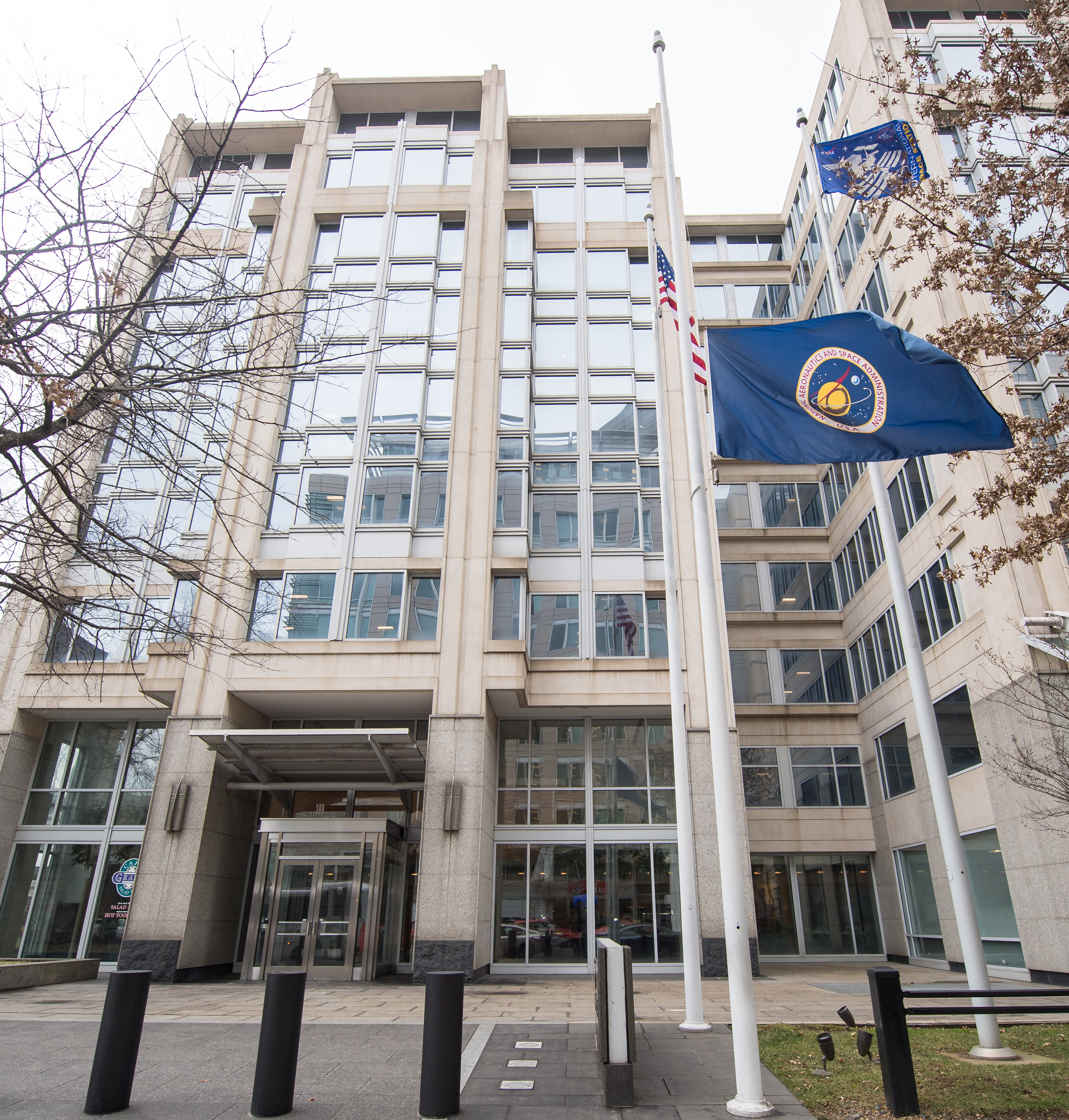
Main entrance

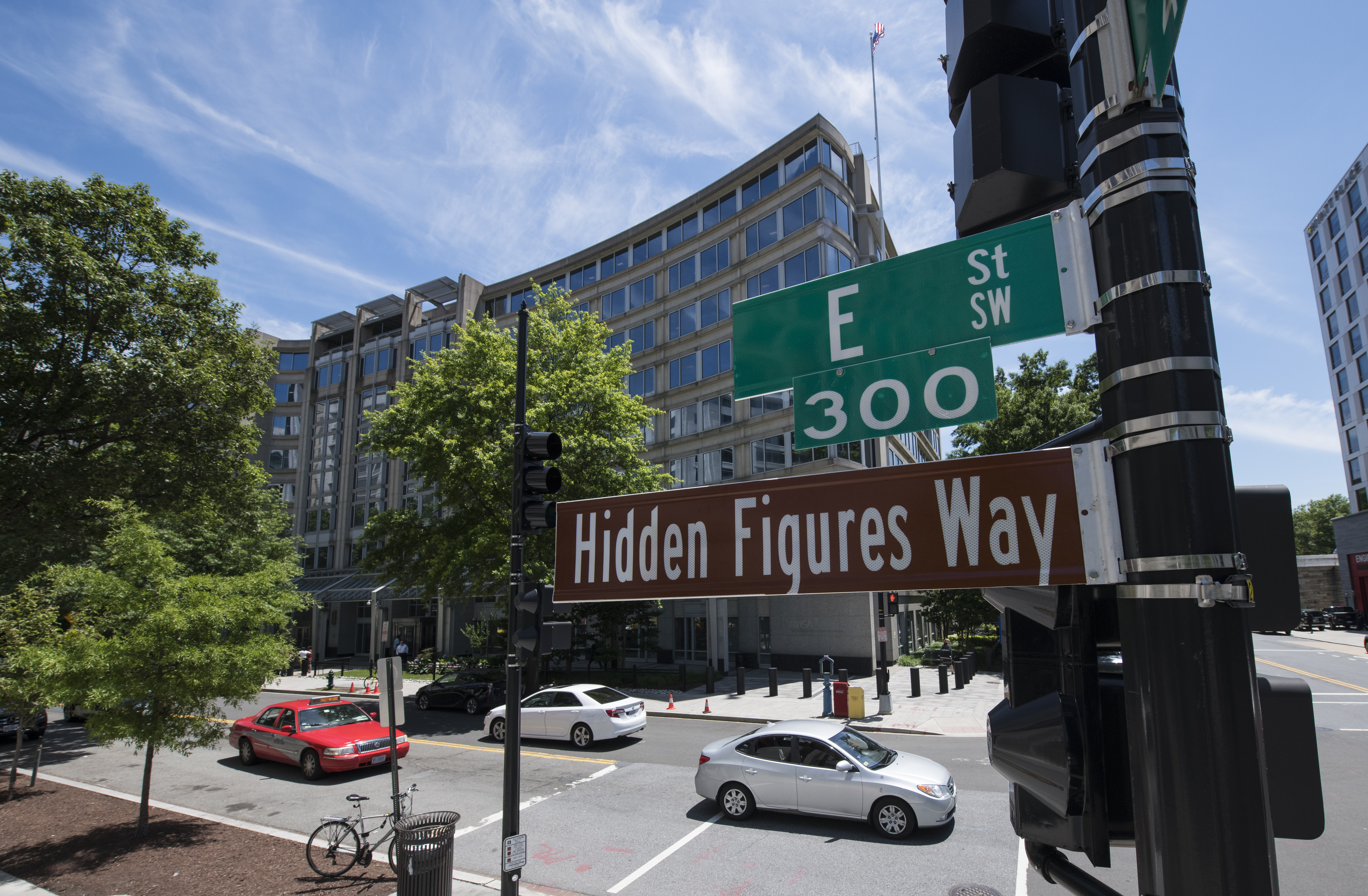
Hidden Figures Way honorary street sign

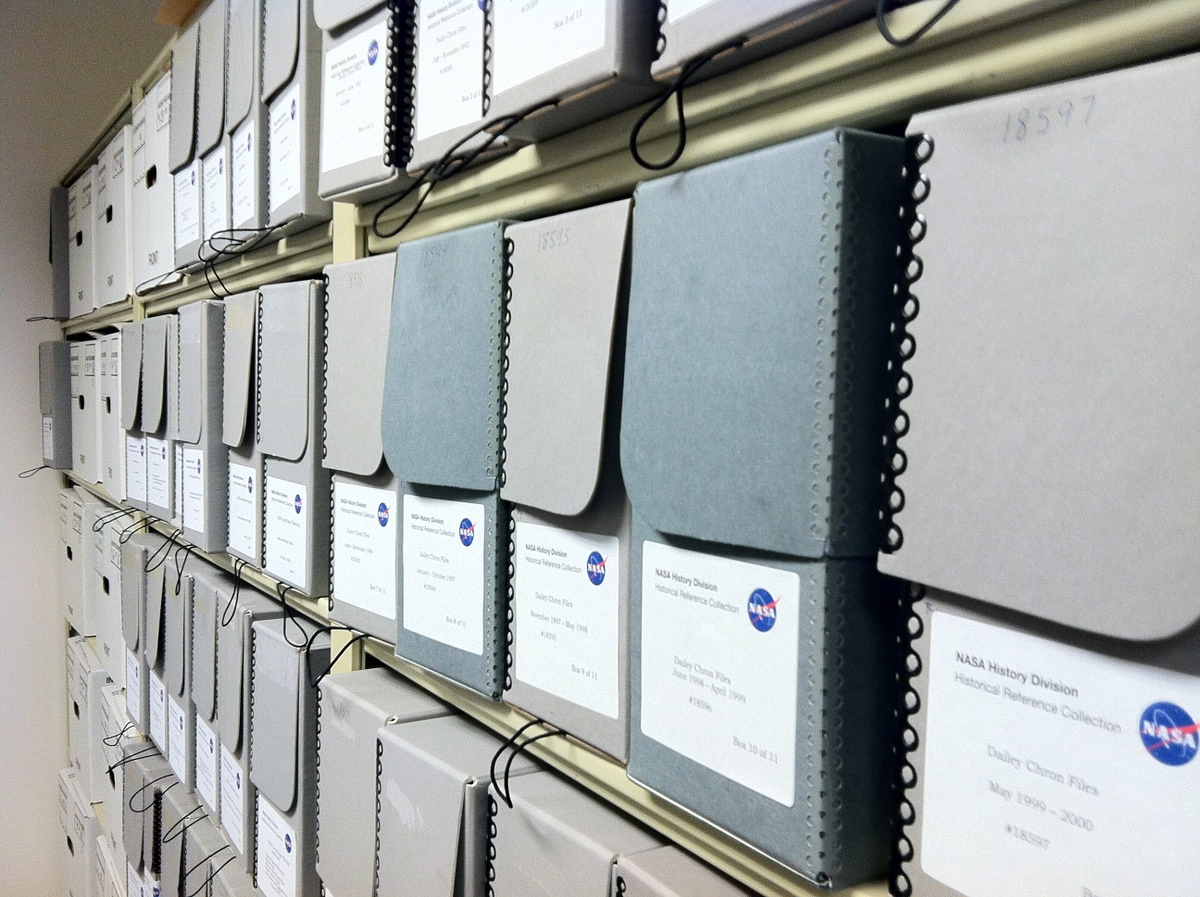
NASA history archives

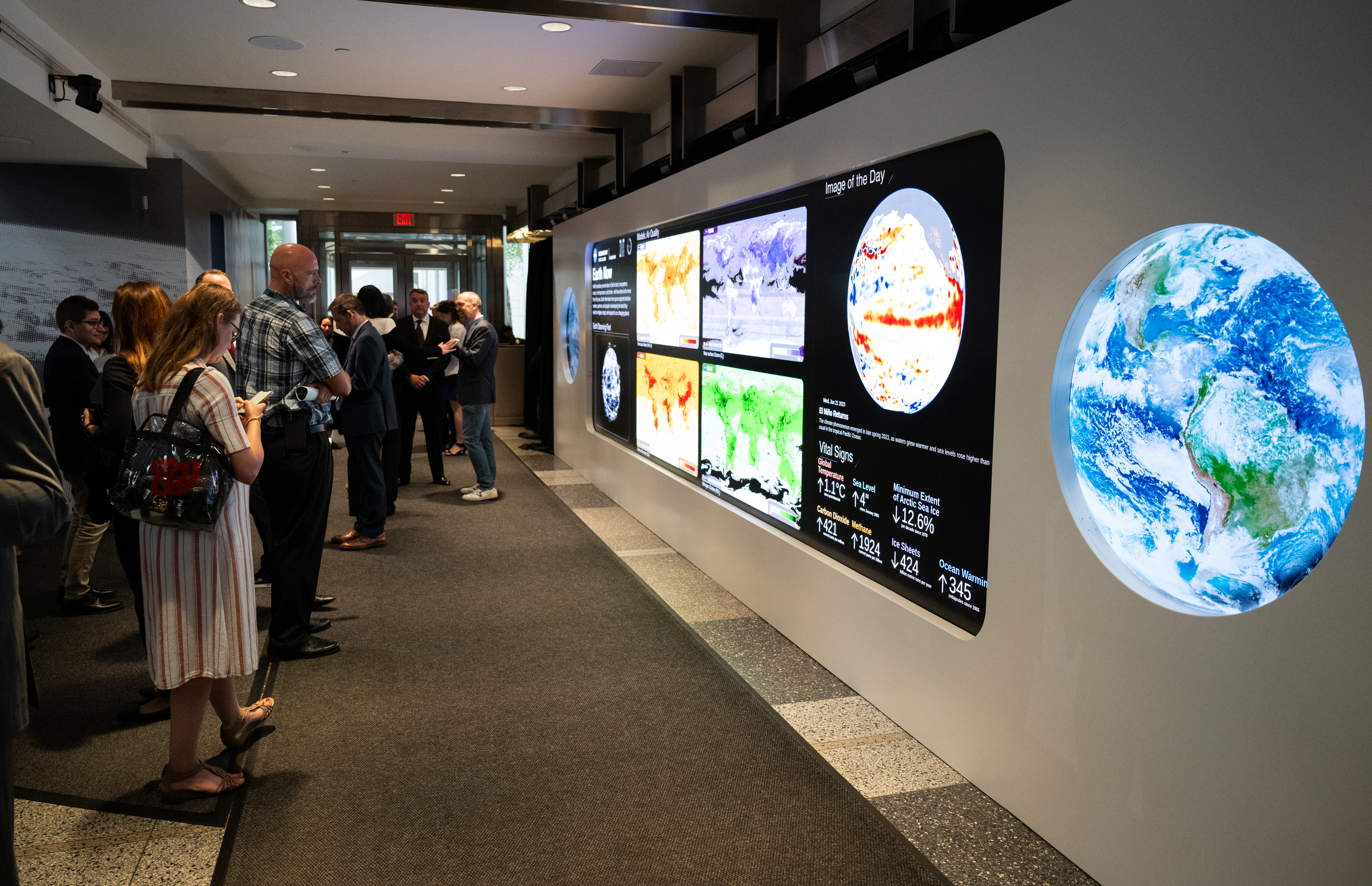
Earth Information Center exhibit

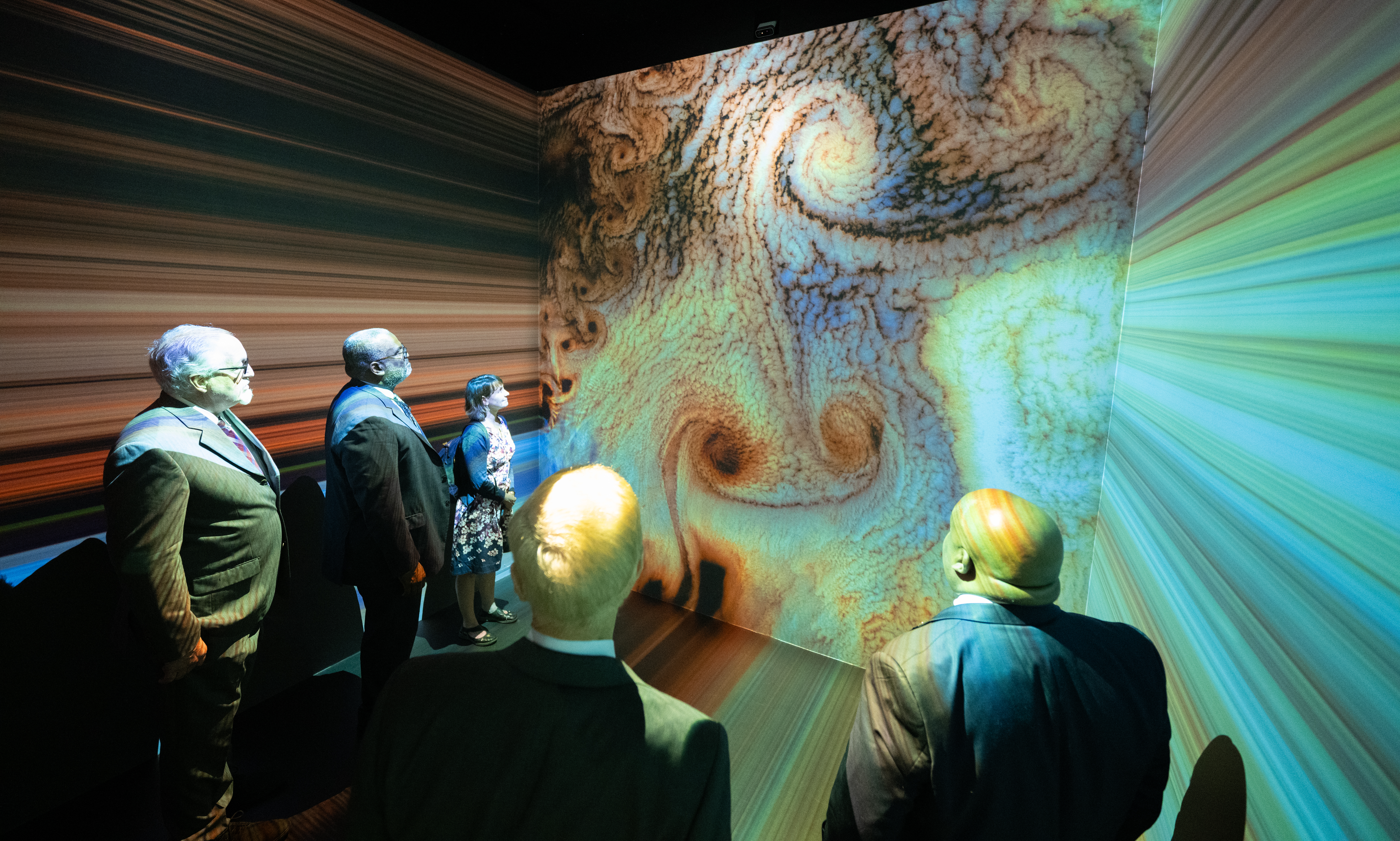
Earth Information Center exhibit
