= Richard Danne =

American graphic designer (born 1934)

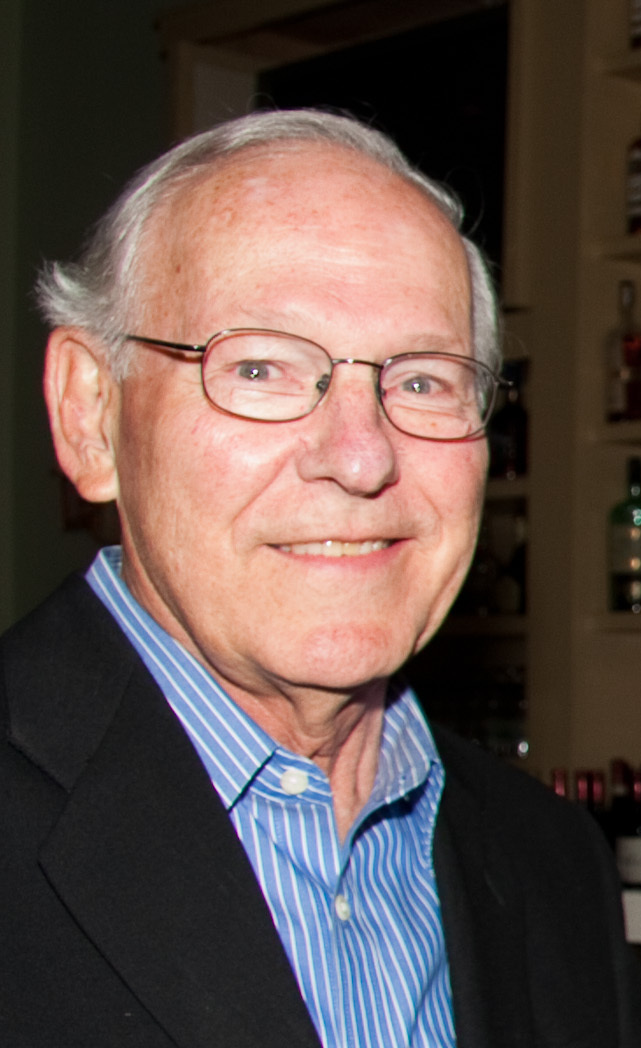
- Danne in 2012
- Born: 1934 (age 91–92); Kingfisher, Oklahoma
- Occupation: Graphic designer
- Notable work: NASA "worm" logotype
- Awards: AIGA Medal, NASA Exceptional Public Achievement Medal

Richard Danne (born 1934) is an American graphic designer who designed the 1975 NASA logotype, nicknamed the "worm", in collaboration with Bruce Blackburn. For his contributions to American design, Danne was awarded the 2014 AIGA Gold Medal.

Danne was born in 1934 in Kingfisher, Oklahoma and grew up on a farm nearby. He attended Oklahoma State University, initially majoring in engineering, before switching to art, and played jazz trumpet. In 1956, Danne enrolled in the UCLA Graduate School of Design. Upon graduation, he started his design career in 1957 in Dallas, Texas, before moving to New York City in 1963. He co-owned design firms Gips & Danne with Phil Gips (1964–1969), Danne & Blackburn with Bruce Blackburn (1973–1984), and Richard Danne & Associates Inc. in 1985.

Danne was the president of American Institute of Graphic Arts (AIGA) in 1977–79. He was also the founding president of AIGA/NY, the organization's New York chapter.

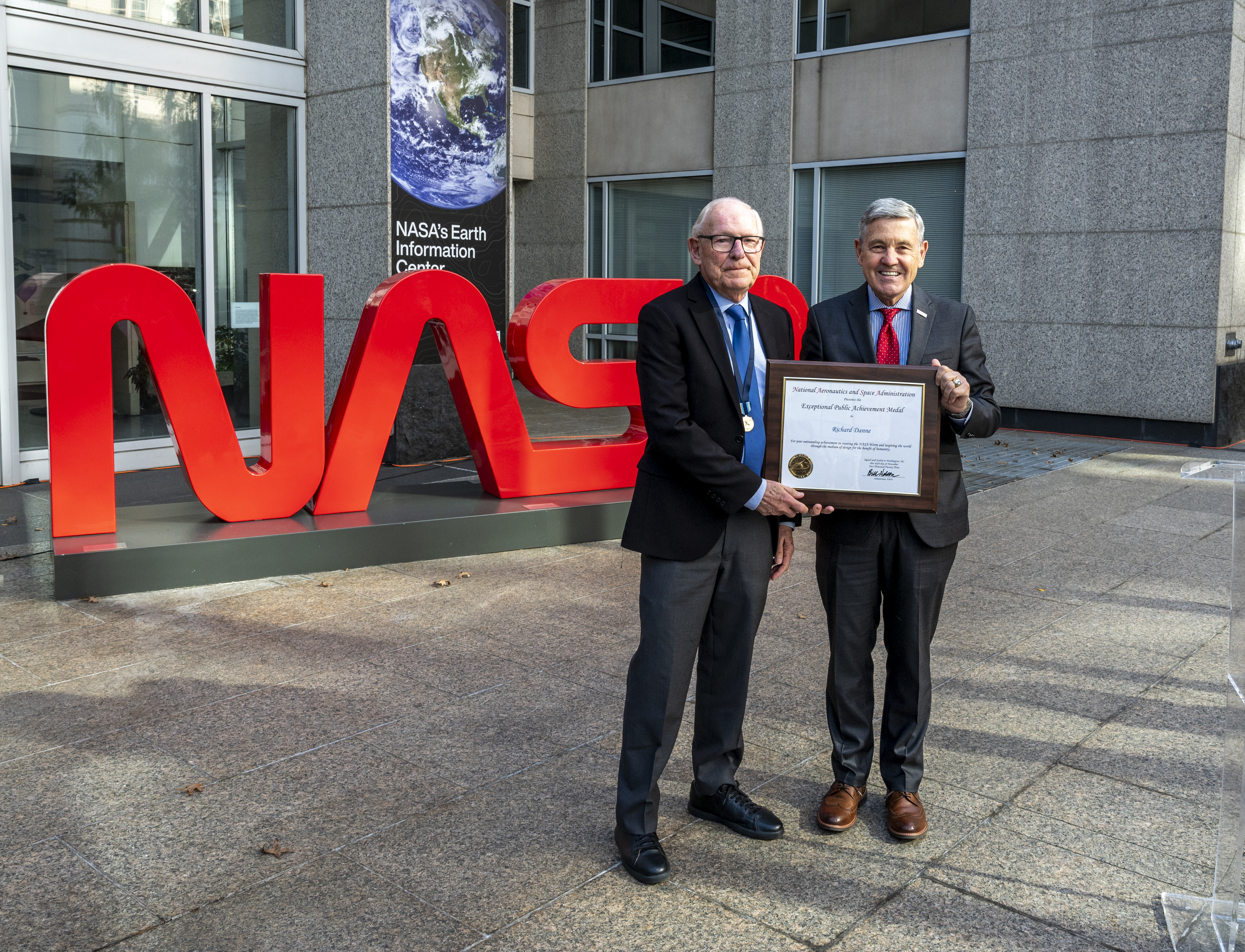
NASA Associate Administrator Bob Cabana and Richard Danne, posing with Danne's Public Achievement Medal and "worm" logo monument outside NASA Headquarters, 2023

Danne was the design director of NASA Graphic Standards Manual, included in permanent collections of Museum of Modern Art and SFMOMA. In 2021, he designed a commemorative watch for NASA. In 2023, he was awarded NASA Exceptional Public Achievement Medal. In 2025, the NASA worm logo was included in Pirouette: Turning Points in Design, an exhibition at the Museum of Modern Art featuring "widely recognized design icons [...] highlighting pivotal moments in design history."
