= Crew Dragon Demo-2 =

First crewed flight of Crew Dragon

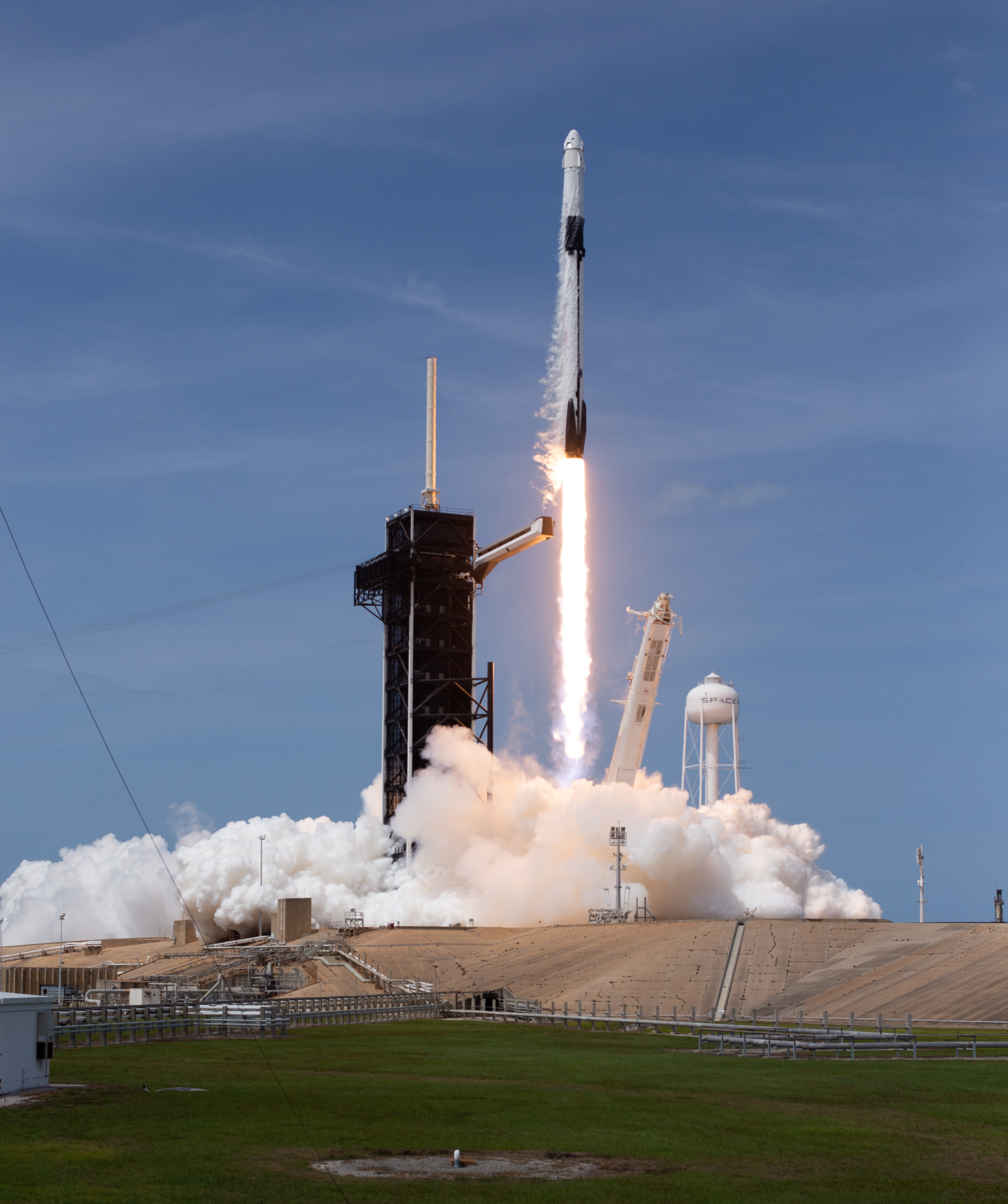
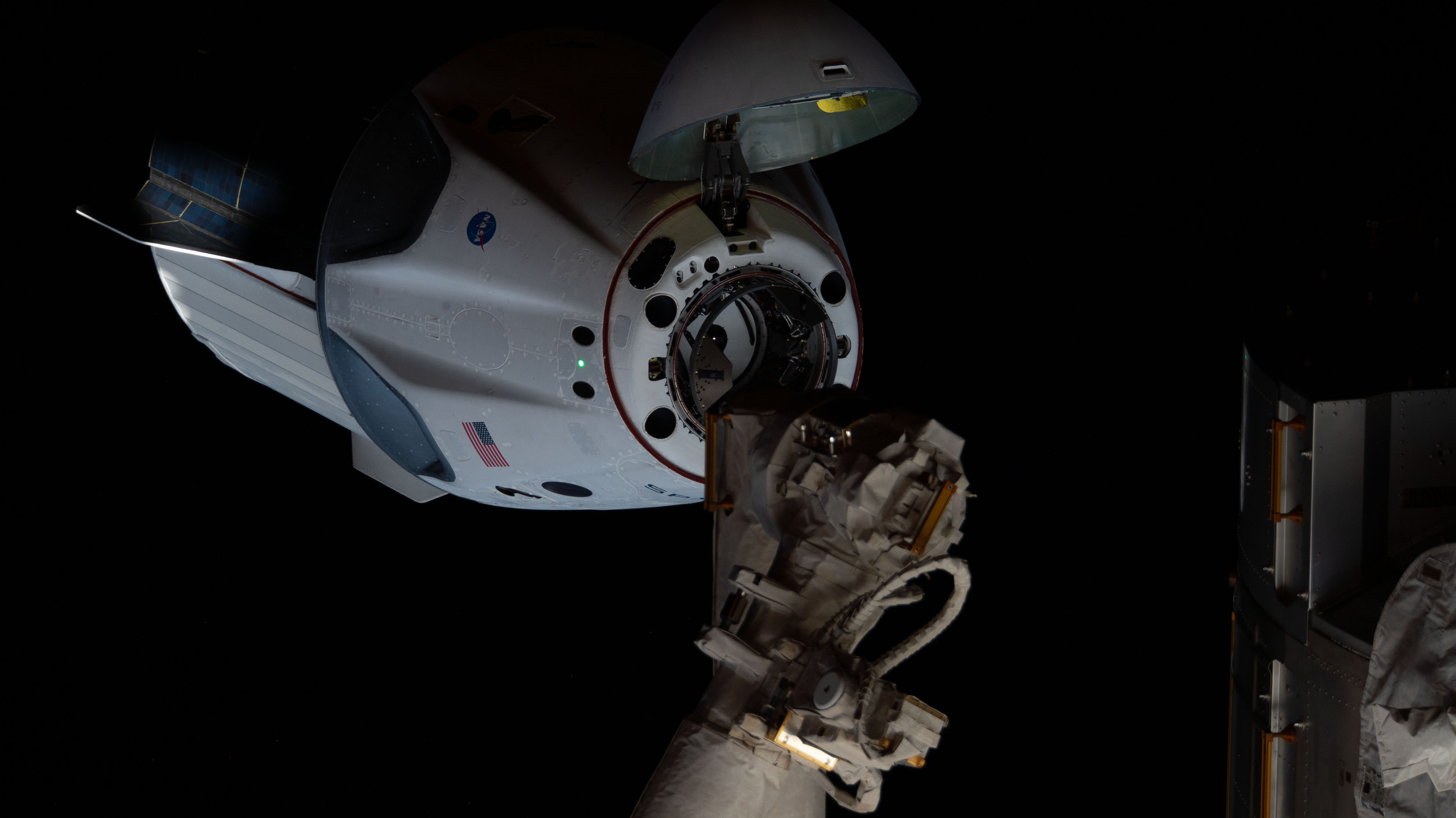
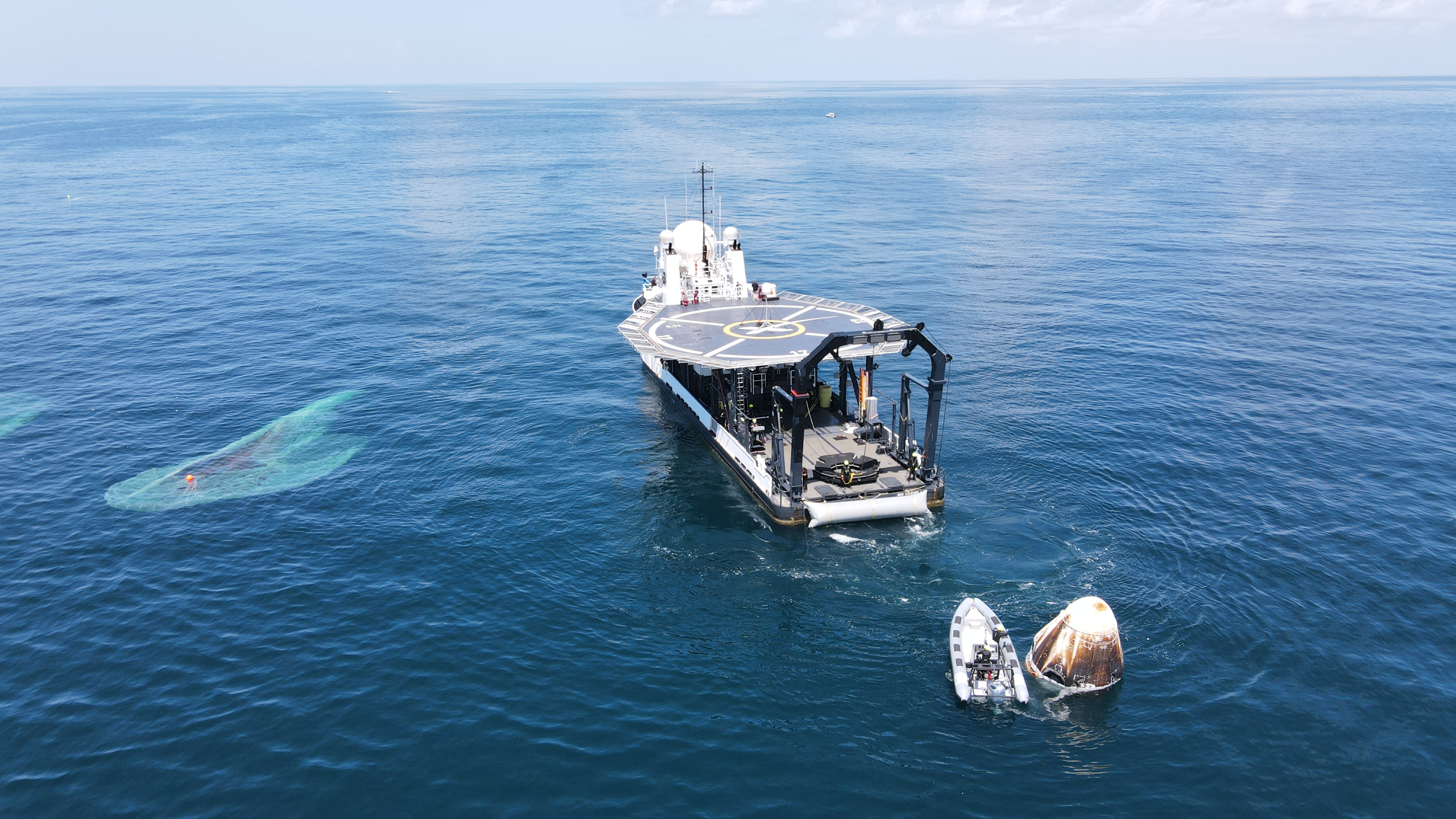
- Clockwise from top left: Falcon 9 with Endeavour launches from LC-39A, Endeavour approaches the ISS, recovery of Endeavour
- Names: Crew Demo-2; SpaceX Demo-2; Demonstration Mission-2
- Mission type: Flight test
- Operator: SpaceX
- COSPAR ID: 2020-033A
- SATCAT no.: 45623
- Mission duration: 63 days, 23 hours, 25 minutes, 21 seconds

Spacecraft properties
- Spacecraft: Crew Dragon Endeavour
- Spacecraft type: Crew Dragon
- Manufacturer: SpaceX
- Launch mass: 12,519 kg (27,600 lb)
- Landing mass: 9,616 kg (21,200 lb)

Crew
- Members: Doug Hurley; Bob Behnken
- Expedition: Expedition 63

Start of mission
- Launch date: May 30, 2020, 19:22:45 UTC (3:22:45 pm EDT)
- Rocket: Falcon 9 Block 5 B1058-1
- Launch site: Kennedy, LC-39A

End of mission
- Recovered by: MV GO Navigator
- Landing date: August 2, 2020, 18:48:06 UTC (1:48:06 pm CDT)
- Landing site: Gulf of Mexico, near Gulf Shores, Alabama (29°47′43″N 87°31′47″W)

Orbital parameters
- Reference system: Geocentric orbit
- Regime: Low Earth orbit
- Inclination: 51.66°

Docking with ISS
- Docking port: Harmony forward
- Docking date: May 31, 2020, 14:27 UTC
- Undocking date: August 1, 2020, 23:35 UTC
- Time docked: 62 days, 9 hours, 8 minutes
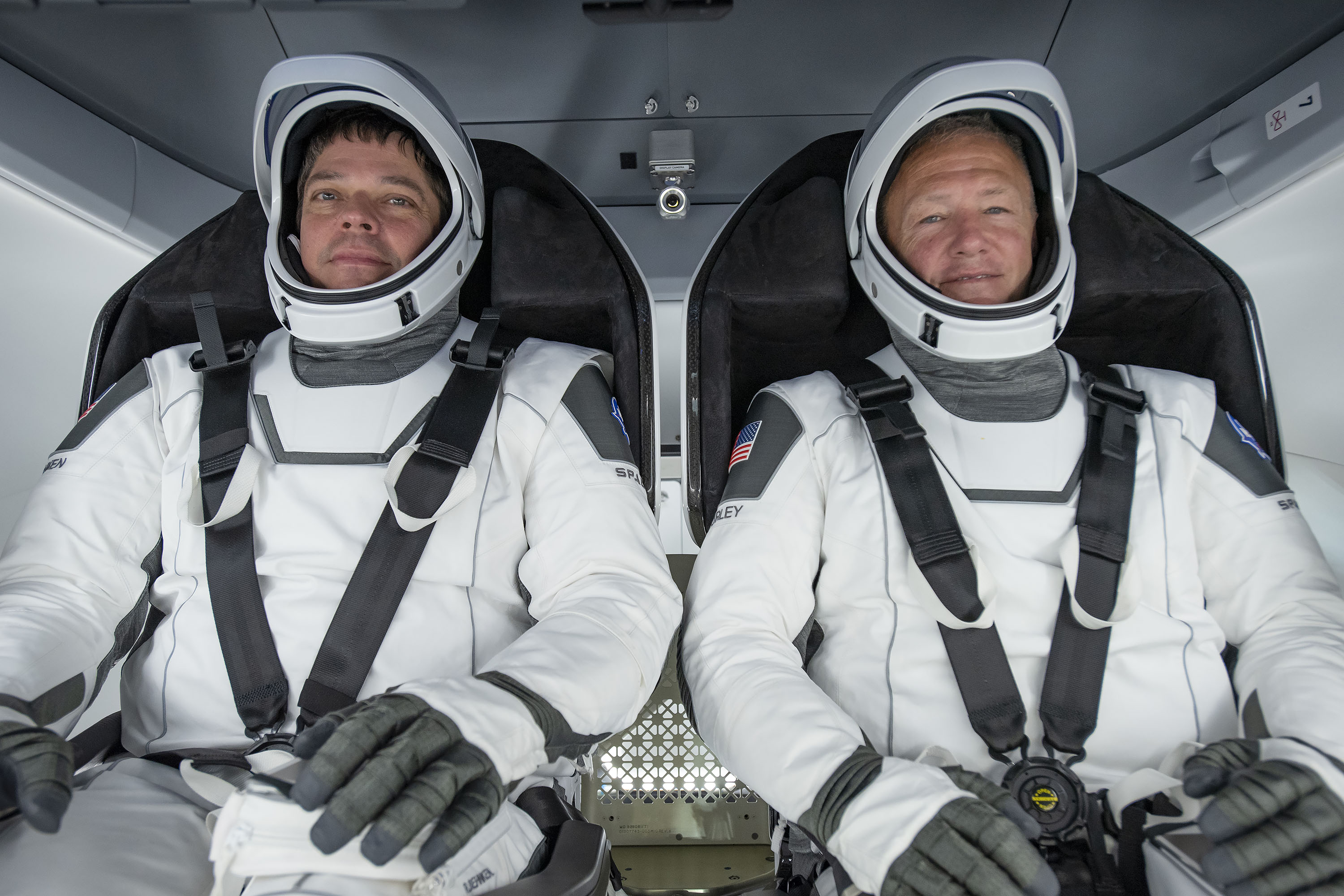
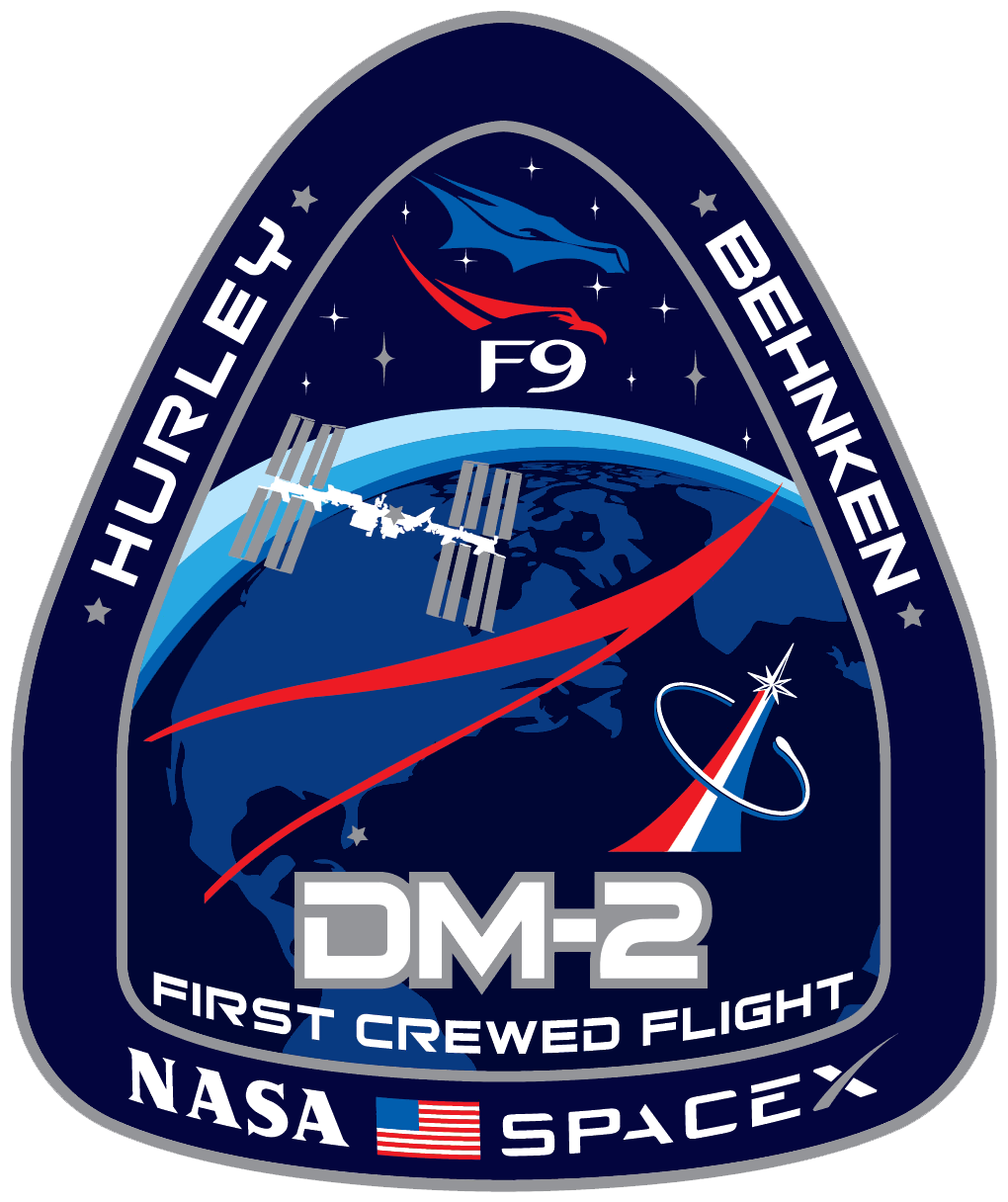
- NASA and SpaceX mission patches Behnken and Hurley Commercial Crew Development Crew Dragon flights

Crew Dragon Demo-2 (officially Crew Demo-2, SpaceX Demo-2, or Demonstration Mission-2) (Note: This mission has multiple official names. Mission operator SpaceX refers to the mission as "Crew Demo-2", while customer NASA refers to the mission as "SpaceX Demo-2", and the United States Space Force refers to the mission as "Dragon Crew Demo-2". Unless otherwise noted, this article uses "Demo-2" to refer this mission) was the first crewed test flight of the Crew Dragon spacecraft. The spacecraft, named Endeavour, launched on May 30, 2020 on a Falcon 9 rocket, and carried NASA astronauts Doug Hurley and Bob Behnken to the International Space Station in the first crewed orbital spaceflight launched from the United States since the final Space Shuttle mission in 2011, and the first ever operated by a commercial provider. Demo-2 was also the first two-person orbital spaceflight launched from the United States since STS-4 in 1982. Demo-2 completed the validation of crewed spaceflight operations using SpaceX hardware and received human-rating certification for the spacecraft, including astronaut testing of Crew Dragon capabilities on orbit.

Docking was autonomously controlled by the Crew Dragon, but monitored by the flight crew in case manual intervention became necessary. The spacecraft soft docked with the International Space Station on May 31, 2020, nineteen hours after launch. Following soft capture, 12 hooks were closed to complete a hard capture 11 minutes later. Hurley and Behnken worked alongside the crew of Expedition 63 for 62 days, including four spacewalks by Behnken with fellow American astronaut Chris Cassidy to replace batteries brought up by a Japanese cargo vehicle. Endeavour autonomously undocked from the station on August 1, 2020, and thirteen hours later returned the astronauts to Earth in the first water landing by astronauts since 1975.

== Background ==
After the Space Shuttle program was brought to an end in 2011, NASA no longer had a spacecraft system capable of sending humans to space. As a result, it was forced to fly its astronauts to the International Space Station (ISS) aboard the Russian Soyuz space vehicle, at a cost of up to US$80 million per astronaut. As an alternative, NASA contracted with private companies such as SpaceX for the Commercial Crew Program, which is expected to cost 50% less than Soyuz once in regular operation. Up to the launch, NASA has awarded a total of US$3.1 billion for the development of the Dragon 2. The Demo-2 mission was SpaceX's last major test before NASA certified it for regular crewed spaceflights. Prior to that, SpaceX had sent twenty cargo missions to the ISS, but never a crewed one. Boeing was separately working on crewed orbital spaceflight under the same NASA effort.

== Crew ==
Doug Hurley and Bob Behnken were announced as the primary crew on August 3, 2018. Both astronauts are veterans of the Space Shuttle program, and the Demo-2 flight was the third trip to space for both of them. The lead flight director for this mission was Zebulon Scoville.

NASA astronaut Kjell Lindgren was the sole backup crew member for the flight, backing up both Hurley and Behnken for the mission.

Prime crew
Position	Astronaut
Spacecraft commander	Doug Hurley; Expedition 63; Third and last spaceflight
Joint operations commander	Bob Behnken; Expedition 63; Third and last spaceflight

Backup crew
Position	Astronaut
Commander	Kjell Lindgren

== Insignia and livery ==
The mission insignia was designed by artist Andrew Nyberg from Brainerd, Minnesota, a nephew of spacecraft commander Hurley. The insignia features the logos of the Commercial Crew Program, Falcon 9, Crew Dragon, and the red chevron of NASA's "meatball" insignia. Also depicted are the American flag and a graphic representation of the ISS. The words NASA, SPACEX, FIRST CREWED FLIGHT and DM-2 are printed around the border along with the surnames of the astronauts. The insignia outline is in the shape of the Crew Dragon capsule.

The Falcon 9 rocket used to launch Endeavour displayed NASA's "worm" insignia, the first time the logo had been used officially since it was retired in 1992. NASA TV and media coverage of the launch was branded as "Launch America", with its own logo.

The SpaceX patch shows the top of the company's spacesuit, with the ISS and North America portrayed on the helmet shield and a white star denoting the launch site at Cape Canaveral. Behind the suit are the American flag, and around the insignia's black border SPACEX DRAGON and NASA DEMO-2 are written in white, alongside the names of the two astronauts at the bottom; with a cloverleaf between the two names.

== Pre-launch processing ==
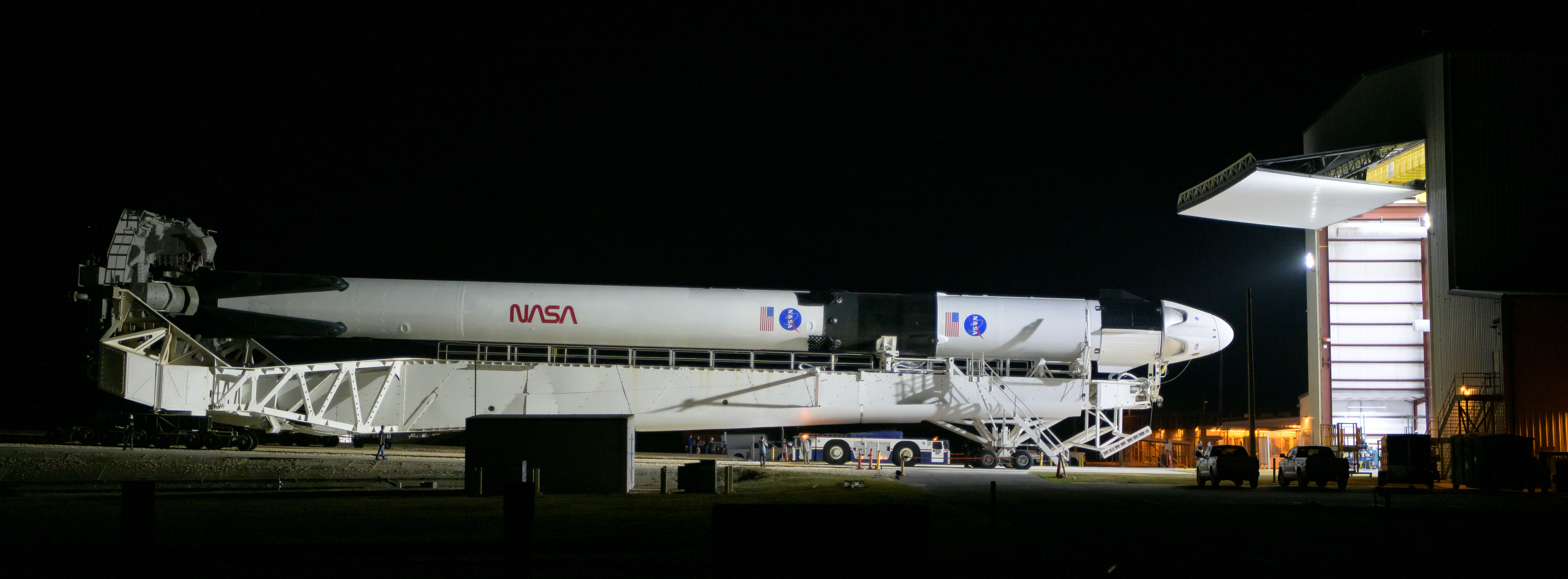
Falcon 9 and Dragon rolls out to the launch pad, bearing the NASA "worm" logo.

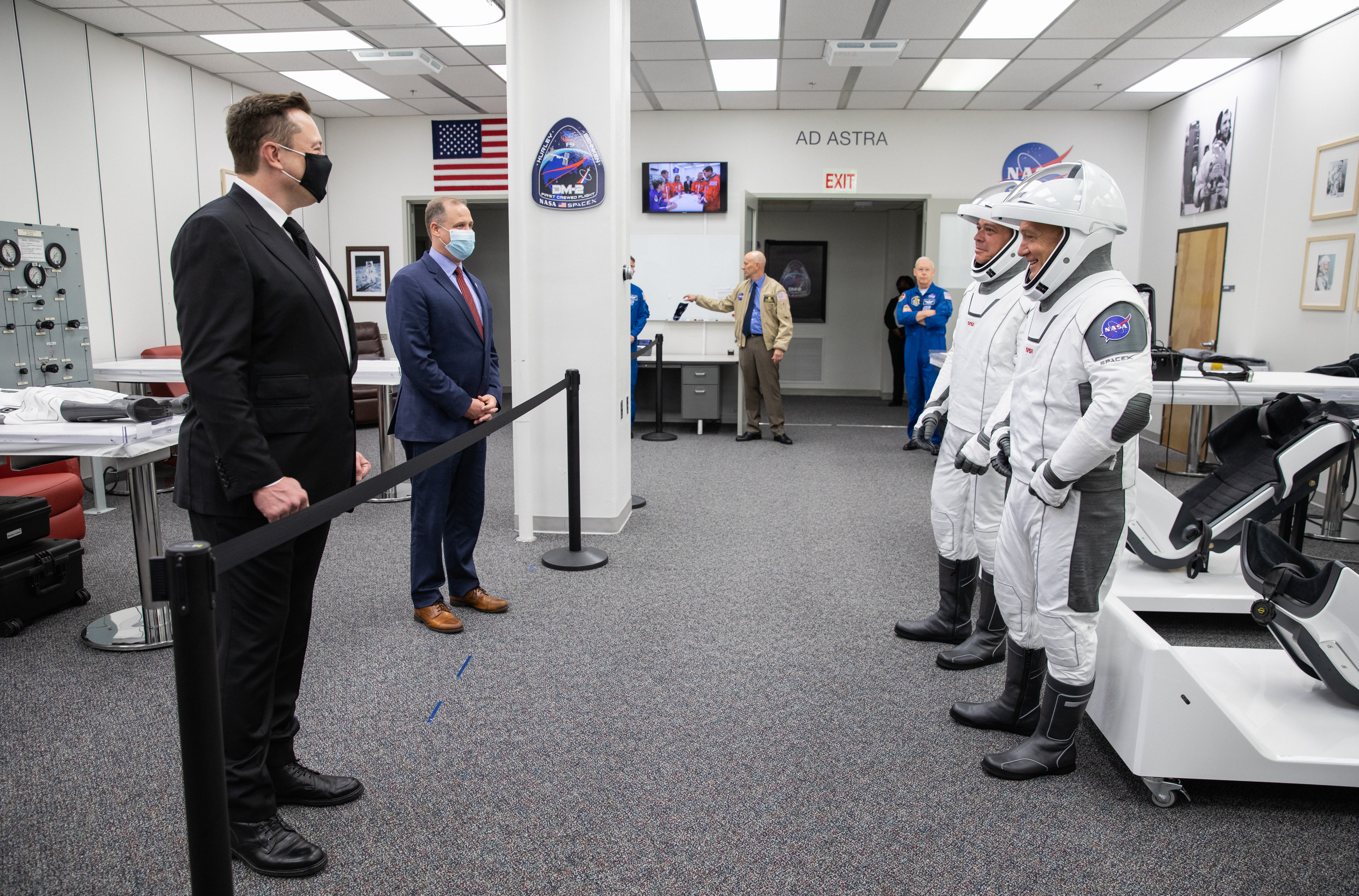
SpaceX CEO Elon Musk and NASA administrator Jim Bridenstine greet Behnken and Hurley at Kennedy, while wearing face masks and practicing social distancing amid the COVID-19 pandemic.

NASA calculated the loss-of-crew (LOC) probability for the test flight as 1-in-276, better than the commercial crew program requirement threshold of 1-in-270. The 1-in-276 number included mitigations to reduce the risk, such as on-orbit inspections of the Crew Dragon spacecraft once it was docked to the space station to look for damage from micrometeoroids and orbital debris (MMOD). NASA pegged the overall risk of a loss of mission (LOM) as 1-in-60, covering scenarios where the Crew Dragon does not reach the space station as planned, but the crew safely returns to Earth.

The Crew Dragon Demo-2 mission was initially planned for launch in July 2019 as part of the Commercial Crew Program contract with a crew of two on a 14-day test mission to the ISS. The Crew Dragon capsule from the Crew Dragon Demo-1 mission was destroyed while its SuperDraco thrusters were undergoing static fire testing on April 20, 2019, ahead of its planned use for the in-flight abort test. SpaceX traced the cause of the anomaly to a component that leaked oxidizer into the high-pressure helium lines, which then solidified and damaged a valve. The valves were since switched for burst discs to prevent another anomaly. On January 19, 2020, a Crew Dragon capsule successfully completed an in-flight abort test. NASA administrator Jim Bridenstine said on April 9, 2020, that he was "fairly confident" that astronauts could fly to the ISS aboard SpaceX's Crew Dragon spaceship at the end of May or in early June 2020, pending final parachute tests, data reviews and a training schedule that could escape major impacts from the ongoing COVID-19 pandemic.

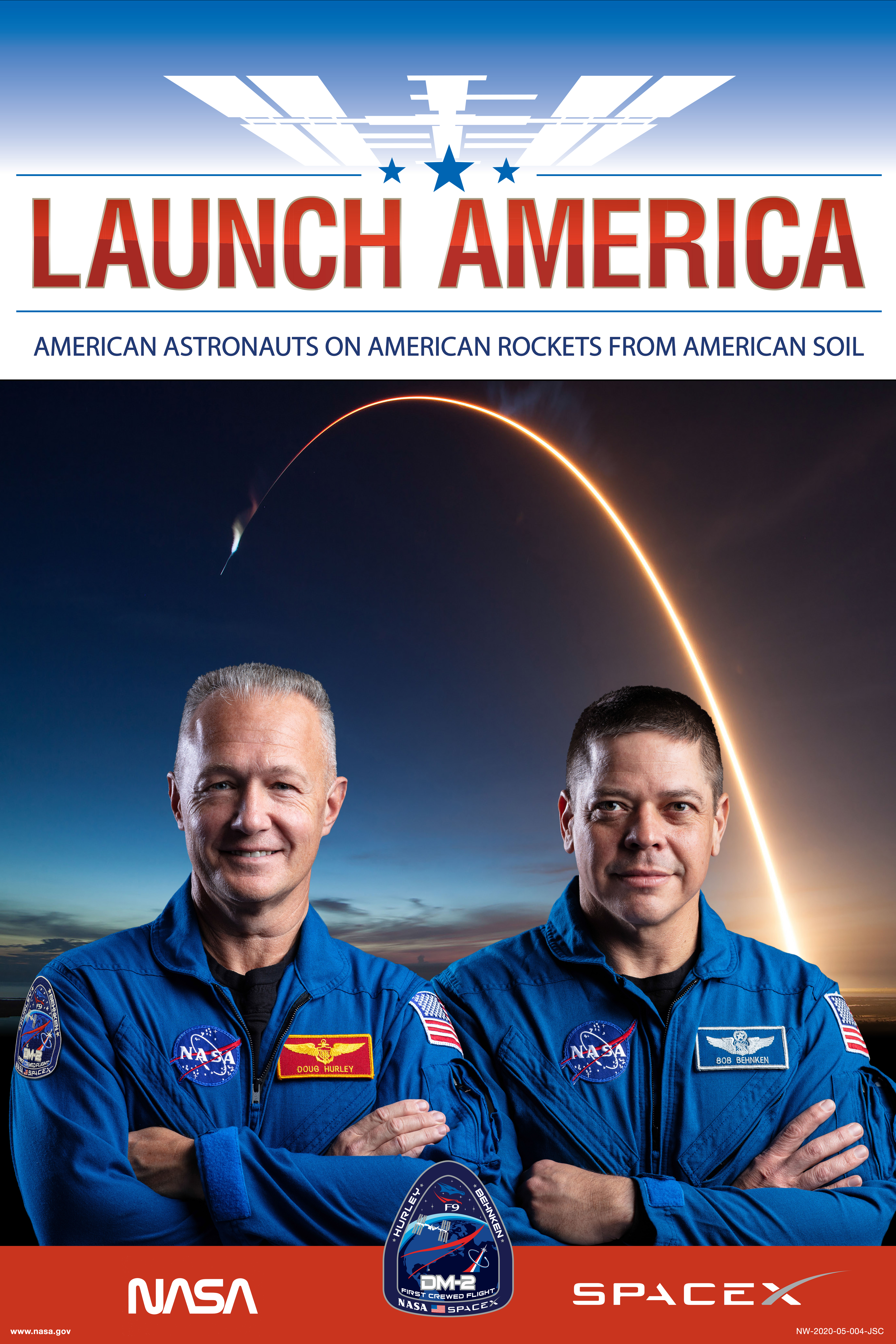
SpaceX DM-2 Promotional Poster

On April 17, 2020, NASA and SpaceX announced the launch date as May 27, 2020. The arrival of the Crew Dragon will have raised the station's crew size from three to five. Bob Behnken and Doug Hurley will have performed duties and conducted experiments as crew on board the ISS for several months. Hurley and Behnken were expected to live and work aboard the space station for two or three months, and then return to Earth for a splashdown in the Atlantic Ocean east of Cape Canaveral. NASA administrator Jim Bridenstine urged space enthusiasts not to travel to the Kennedy Space Center to view the launch and asked people to instead watch the launch on television or online. Bridenstine explained that maintenance crews were working in cohesive shifts, to mitigate workers' exposure to SARS-CoV-2. On May 1, 2020, SpaceX successfully demonstrated the Mark 3 parachute system, a critical milestone for the mission approval. Crew Dragon Demo-2 marked the first crewed United States spaceflight mission not to include the presence of the public at the Kennedy Space Center Visitor Complex due to the COVID-19 pandemic. As the mission was previously delayed, the Visitor Complex opened as of May 28, 2020, with limited capacity for publicly viewing the launch. Admissions sold out almost immediately. To engage the public, notably the Class of 2020, who were unable to attend their graduations due to the COVID-19 pandemic, both NASA and SpaceX invited students and graduates to submit their photos to be flown to the ISS.

Behnken and Hurley arrived at Kennedy Space Center on May 20, 2020, in preparation for the launch. On May 21, 2020, the Falcon 9 rocket was rolled out to the launch pad, and a static fire test was conducted on May 22, 2020, a major milestone ahead of the launch. The mission used a Tesla Model X to transport Hurley and Behnken to LC-39A.

=== Launch attempts ===
An official launch weather forecast for Dragon Crew Demo-2 by the 45th Weather Squadron of the U.S. Space Force, for the original launch time at 20:33:33 UTC on May 27, 2020, predicted a 50% probability of favorable conditions. The launch was scrubbed at T−16:53 minutes due to thunderstorms and light rain in the area caused by Tropical Storm Bertha. The second launch attempt also faced a 50% probability of favorable conditions, but was successful and took place on May 30, 2020, at 19:22:45 UTC. The other launch windows were May 31, 2020, at 19:00:07 UTC, with a 60% probability of favorable conditions and June 2, 2020, at 18:13 UTC with a 70% probability of favorable conditions.

==== Launch attempt summary ====
Note: times are local to the launch site (Eastern Daylight Time).

Attempt	Planned	Result	Turnaround	Reason	Decision point	Weather go (%)	Notes
1	27 May 2020, 4:33:33 pm	Scrubbed	—	Weather	27 May 2020, 4:16 pm (T−00:16:53)	50	Rocket generated lightning risk (field mill rule violation).
2	30 May 2020, 3:22:45 pm	Success	2 days 22 hours 49 minutes			50	

== Mission ==
=== Launch and orbit ===
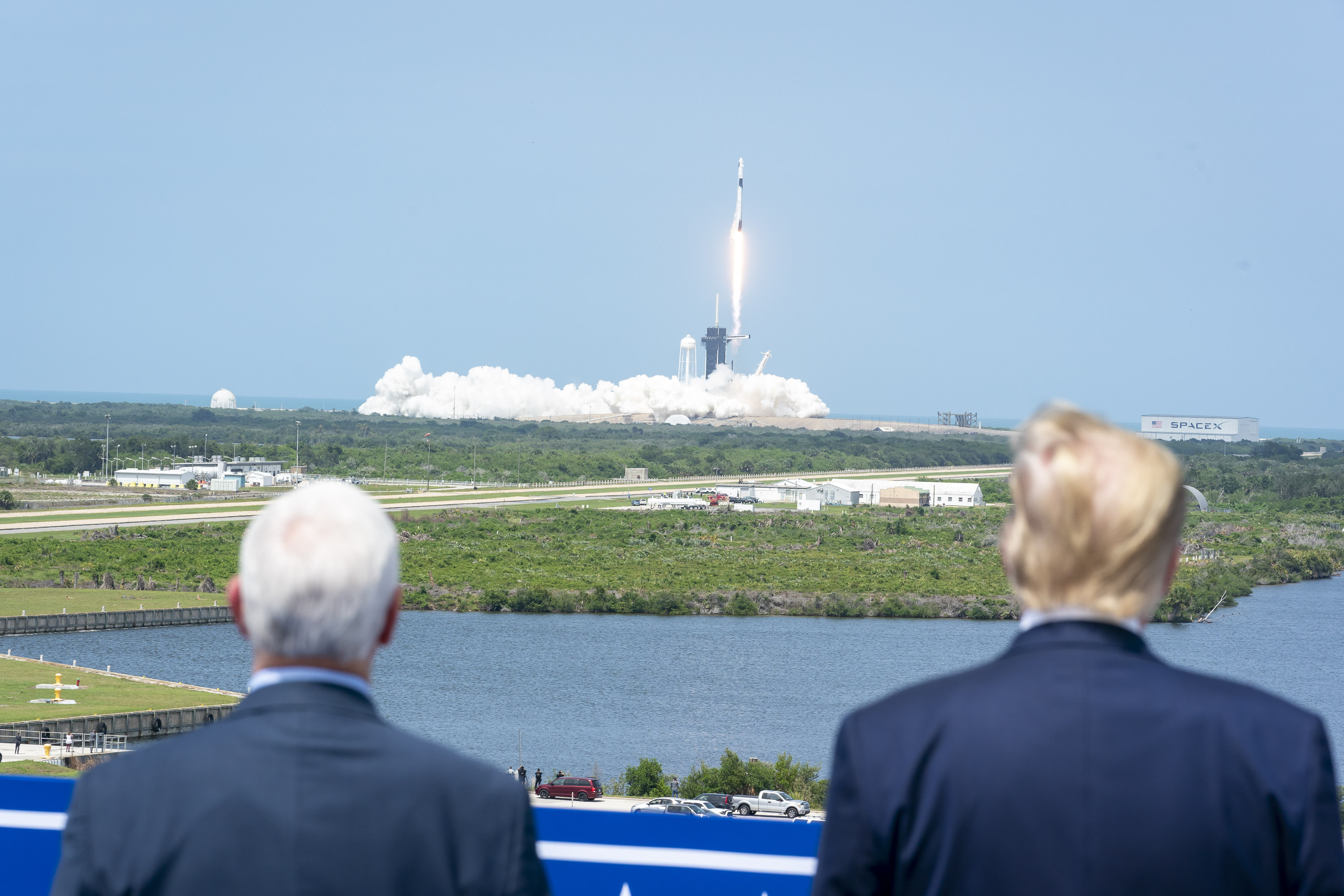
Vice President Mike Pence and President Donald Trump watch the Crew Dragon Demo-2 Falcon 9 rocket launch from Kennedy Space Center.

Three days after the first launch attempt was scrubbed, the Crew Dragon Endeavour launched atop a Falcon 9 rocket from Kennedy Space Center Launch Complex 39A at 19:22:45 UTC on May 30, 2020. The first stage booster (serial number B1058) landed autonomously on the floating barge Of Course I Still Love You, which was prepositioned in the Atlantic Ocean. President Donald Trump and Vice President Mike Pence, with their wives, were at Kennedy Space Center in Florida to see the launch attempt on May 27, 2020, and returned for launch on May 30, 2020. The launch live stream was watched online by 3 million people on NASA feeds, and the SpaceX feed peaked at 4.1 million viewers. NASA estimated roughly 10 million people watched on various online platforms, approximately 150,000 people gathered on Florida's space coast in addition to an unknown number watching on television.

Hurley and Behnken described Falcon 9 as a "very pure flying machine", and the ride on SpaceX Merlin engines as much smoother than with Space Shuttle Solid Rocket Boosters. Hurley said that the Merlin Vacuum upper-stage engine was rougher than Space Shuttle Main Engines, "kind of like driving fast on a dirt road". They revealed the name of their Crew Dragon capsule 206, Endeavour, shortly after launch, reviving the tradition from the Mercury, Gemini, and Apollo programs where astronauts would name their spacecraft. It was the third U.S. spacecraft named Endeavour, after Space Shuttle Endeavour, built in 1991 to replace Space Shuttle Challenger, which was destroyed in 1986, and the Apollo command and service module used for the Apollo 15 mission in 1971. Hurley said that they chose Endeavour as both his and Behnken's first flights to space were on the Shuttle Endeavour.

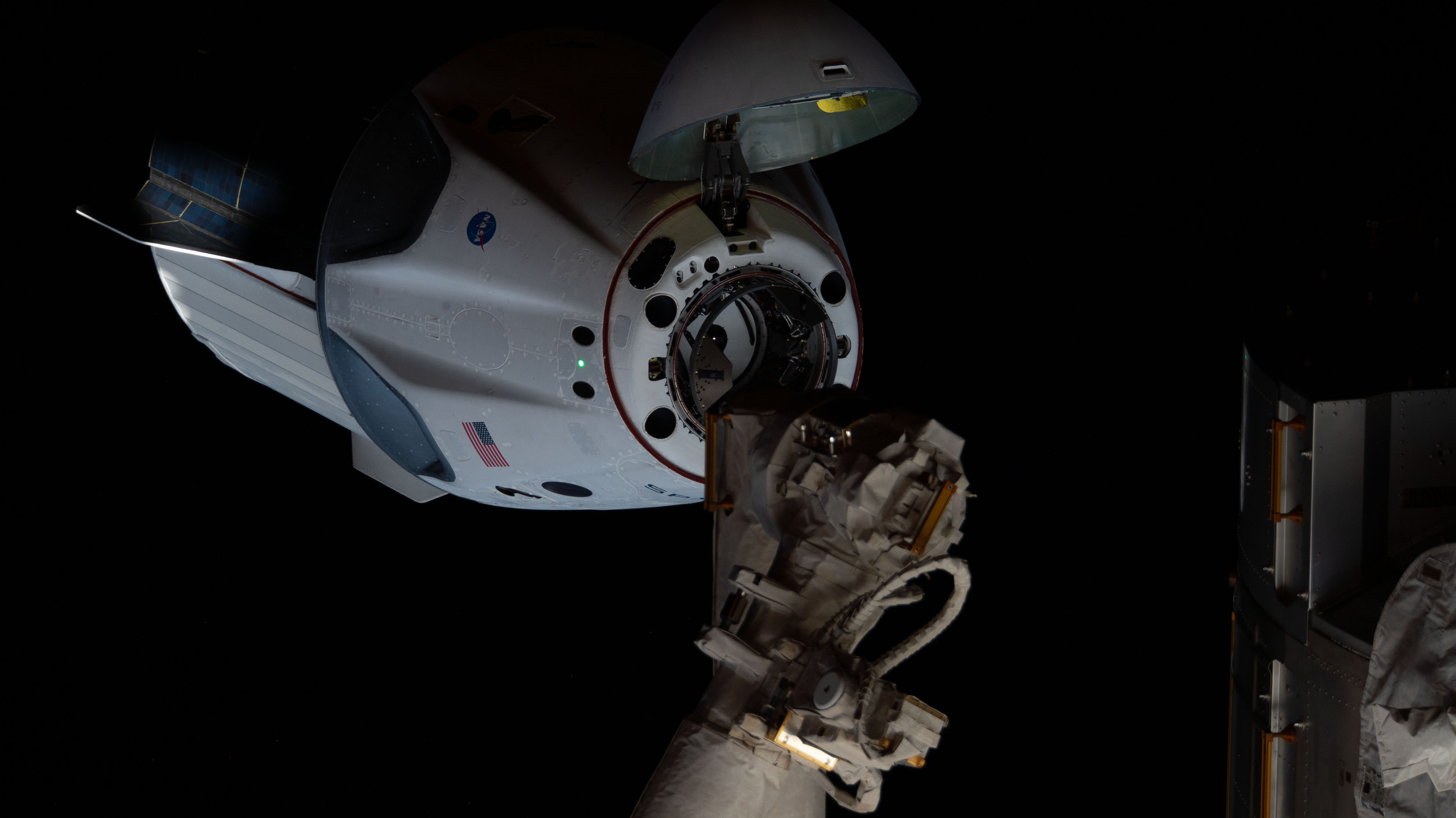
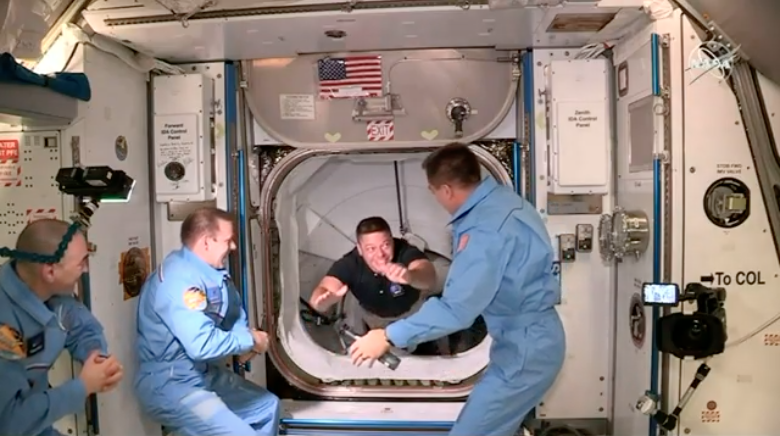
Nineteen hours into the mission, Endeavour arrived at the ISS. Behnken and Hurley greeted the crew of Expedition 63 shortly after the hatch was opened three hours later.

Each crew member brought along a toy from their family; an Apatosaurus dinosaur named "Tremor" and a Ty plush toy. As in past space missions, the plush toy was used as an indication of zero gravity for the strapped-in astronauts. Behnken and Hurley said, "That was a super cool thing for us to get a chance to do for both of our sons, who I hope are super excited to see their toys floating around with us on board".

The crew were awakened on the second day of the flight with Black Sabbath's "Planet Caravan". NASA began a tradition of playing music to astronauts during the Gemini program, and first used music to wake up a flight crew during Apollo 15. Each track is specially chosen, often by the astronauts' families, and usually has a special meaning to an individual member of the crew, or is applicable to their daily activities.

=== Approach, docking, and activities aboard the ISS ===
Nineteen hours later, Endeavour approached the ISS. Hurley demonstrated the ability to pilot the spacecraft via its touchscreen controls until it reached a distance of 220 metres (720 ft), after which Endeavour autonomously soft-docked to the pressurized mating adapter PMA-2 on the Harmony module of the ISS at 14:16 UTC on May 31, 2020. Following soft capture, 12 hooks were closed to complete a hard capture at 14:27 UTC. Approximately two hours after docking, the last of three hatches between Endeavour and ISS was opened, and Hurley and Behnken boarded the ISS at 17:22 UTC, welcomed by and joining the Expedition 63 crew, consisting of NASA astronaut and station commander Chris Cassidy and Russian cosmonauts Anatoly Ivanishin and Ivan Vagner.

Over their time aboard the ISS, Hurley and Behnken spent over 100 hours completing science experiments, while traveling 27 million miles over their 1024 orbits of the Earth. Behnken also completed 4 spacewalks with Chris Cassidy.

=== Undocking and return ===
NASA mission managers had evaluated additional sites off Panama City, Florida, Tallahassee, Tampa, and Daytona Beach to provide more options in the event of stormy tropical weather. The United States Coast Guard advised against entering a 10 nmi (19 km; 12 mi) square defined in its Notices to Mariners for the hours leading up to splashdown noting "hazardous space operations" and the Federal Aviation Administration (FAA) restricted air traffic in the area in a NOTAM.

Endeavour stayed docked to the ISS for 62 days, 9 hours and 8 minutes, undocking at 23:35 UTC on August 1, 2020. At the time of undocking, Endeavour weighed approximately 12,520 kg (27,600 lb). The capsule completed four departure burns to move away from the ISS, followed by a phasing burn lasting over six minutes to place the capsule on a trajectory to return to Earth. The crew was awakened on the final day of the flight with prerecorded voice messages from their sons. A yaw maneuver occurred at 17:51 to separate the "claw" umbilical mechanism from the trunk.

The deorbit burn of 11 minutes and 22 seconds occurred shortly after 17:56 UTC. Just before reentry at 18:11 UTC, the nose cone was closed. Drogue chutes deployed at 18:44 UTC for approximately one minute, drawing out main parachute deployment approximately one minute later. A maximum of 4 g was experienced by Dragon capsule and its crew during the re-entry period. Endeavour returned to Earth with 150 kg (330 lb) of cargo including 90 kg (200 lb) of science cargo, mostly kept in freezers.

Sixty-three days, 23 hours, 25 minutes and 21 seconds after launch, at 18:48:06 UTC on August 2, 2020, Endeavour splashed down off the coast of Pensacola, Florida, marking the first splashdown in 45 years for NASA astronauts since the Apollo–Soyuz Test Project, as well as the first splashdown of a crewed spacecraft in the Gulf of Mexico. After splashdown, a crew in one fast boat approached the capsule, checking the air quality for any traces of highly toxic hypergolic propellant which could indicate a leak, while a crew in another fast boat collected the four parachutes which had disconnected from the capsule. While crews worked, many private boats entered the hazardous area defined by the Coast Guard despite earlier warnings. Some moving close to the capsule even passing between the capsule placing themselves and recovery crews themselves in danger. After radioed warnings, the boats dispersed to form a more distant ring around the capsule. The United States Coast Guard said in a statement later that evening that previous warnings were advisory in nature; the three patrol boats in the area were stationed within their jurisdiction and did not provide sufficient resources to board vessels interfering with the recovery. The statement added that they would be reviewing events with NASA and SpaceX. Later SpaceX and NASA confirmed that their next mission will have a 16 km (9.9 mi) enforceable keep-out zone patrolled by the U.S. Coast Guard. There will be more boats to assist in enforcing the keep-out zone.

The MV GO Navigator, with the assistance of a fast boat crew, attached to the capsule using a retracting A-frame device over the back to place the capsule on the "nest". The "nest" was then pulled further on board the ship where a 30-minute purge of the service section took place, as there were abnormally high levels of dinitrogen tetroxide detected around the capsule. Hurley and Behnken were then greeted by crew aboard GO Navigator and were subsequently helped out of the capsule and onto stretchers where they were taken into the onboard medical facility, before taking a helicopter back to land.

Post-flight analysis of the Dragon's heat shield revealed higher-than-expected erosion at four points where the capsule bolts to the trunk of the vehicle using tension ties. SpaceX stated that the erosion was likely caused by airflow phenomena that were not expected to occur around the ties. The heat shield design was changed to include more erosion-resistant materials at the ties. One of four ties was noted to have deep erosion. Though it could not be determined why this was not seen during SpaceX Demo-1, Hans Koenigsmann speculated that it may be related to different masses and trajectories flown by the spacecraft. In addition, SpaceX noted that the parachutes were deployed lower than expected, but still within the allowable range. To address the issue, the instrument used to measure barometric pressure which determines altitude was replaced.

SpaceX Crew Dragon Demo-2 landing and recovery
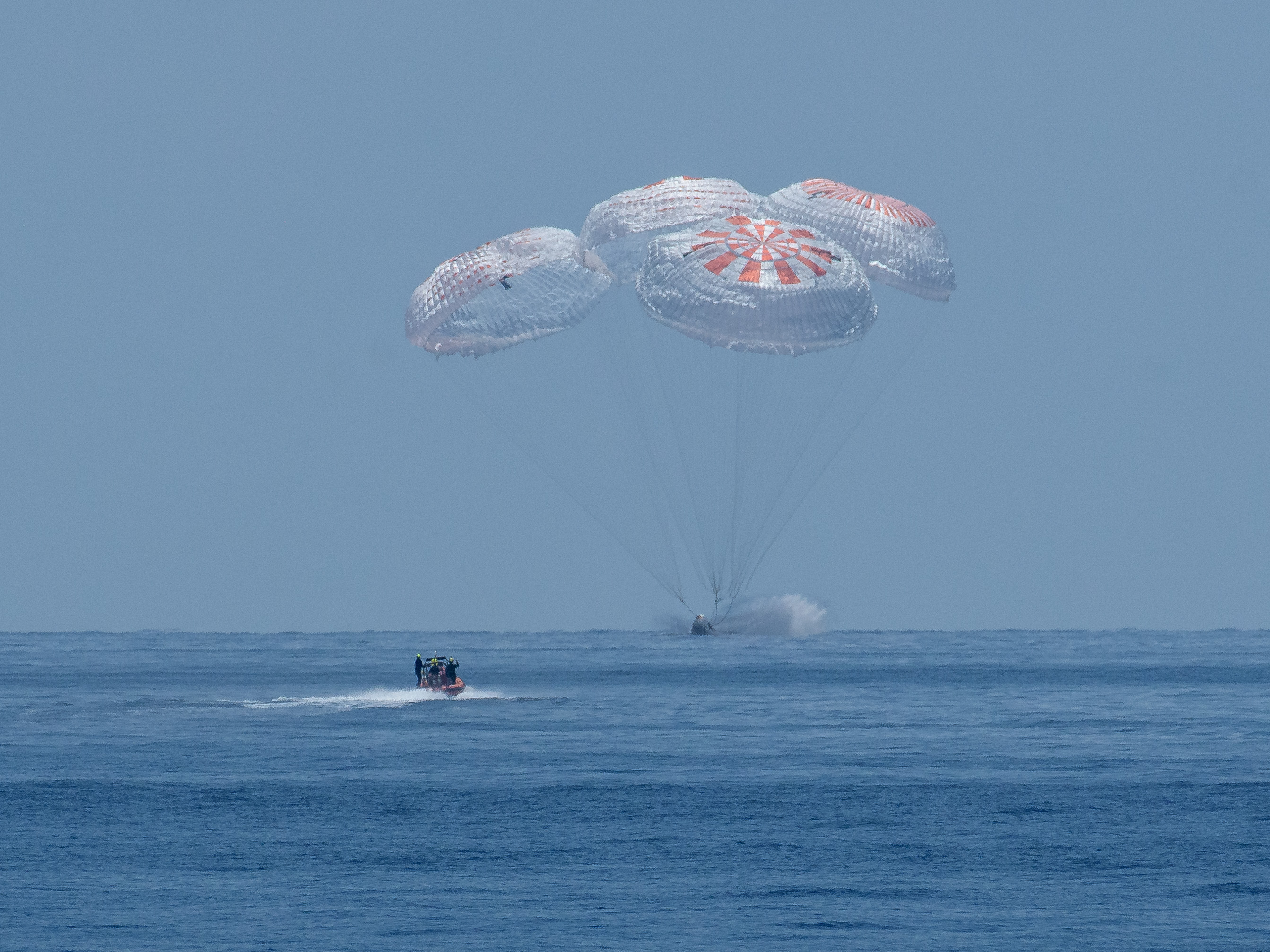
Crew Dragon Endeavour landing in the Gulf of Mexico on August 2, 2020.

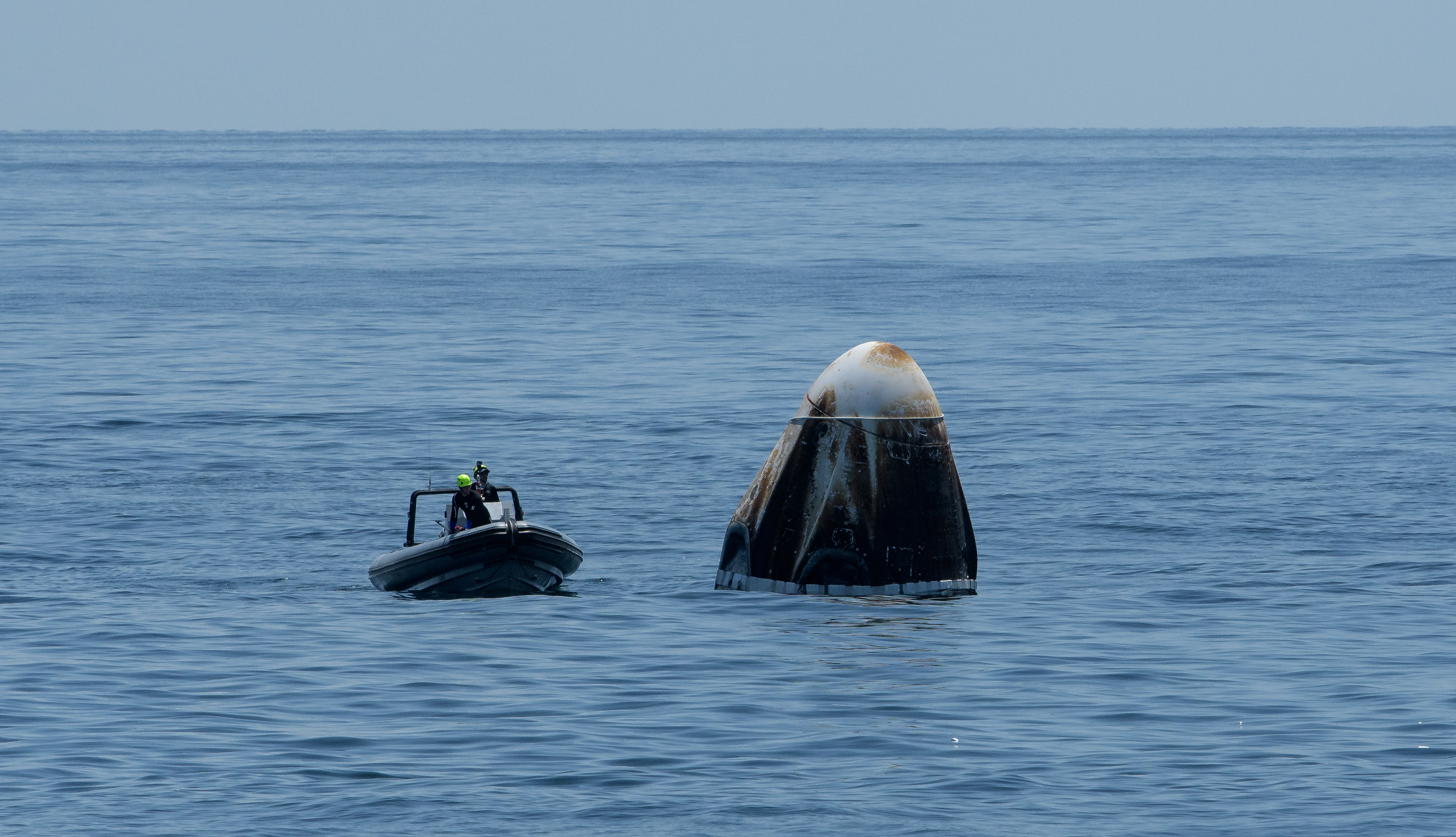
Support teams arrive in a fast boat at the SpaceX Crew Dragon Endeavour.

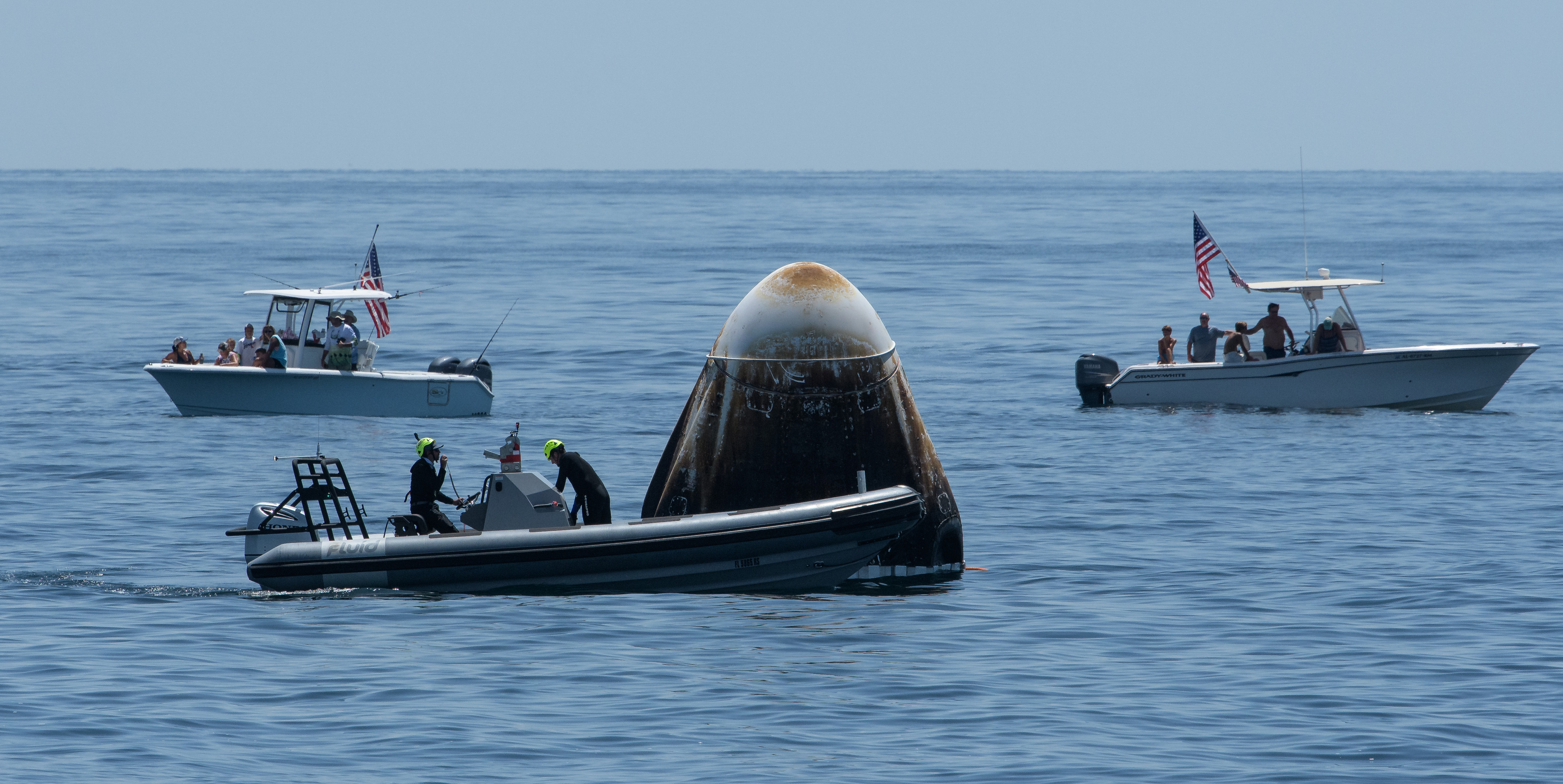
Private boats coming close to a crew working on the capsule.

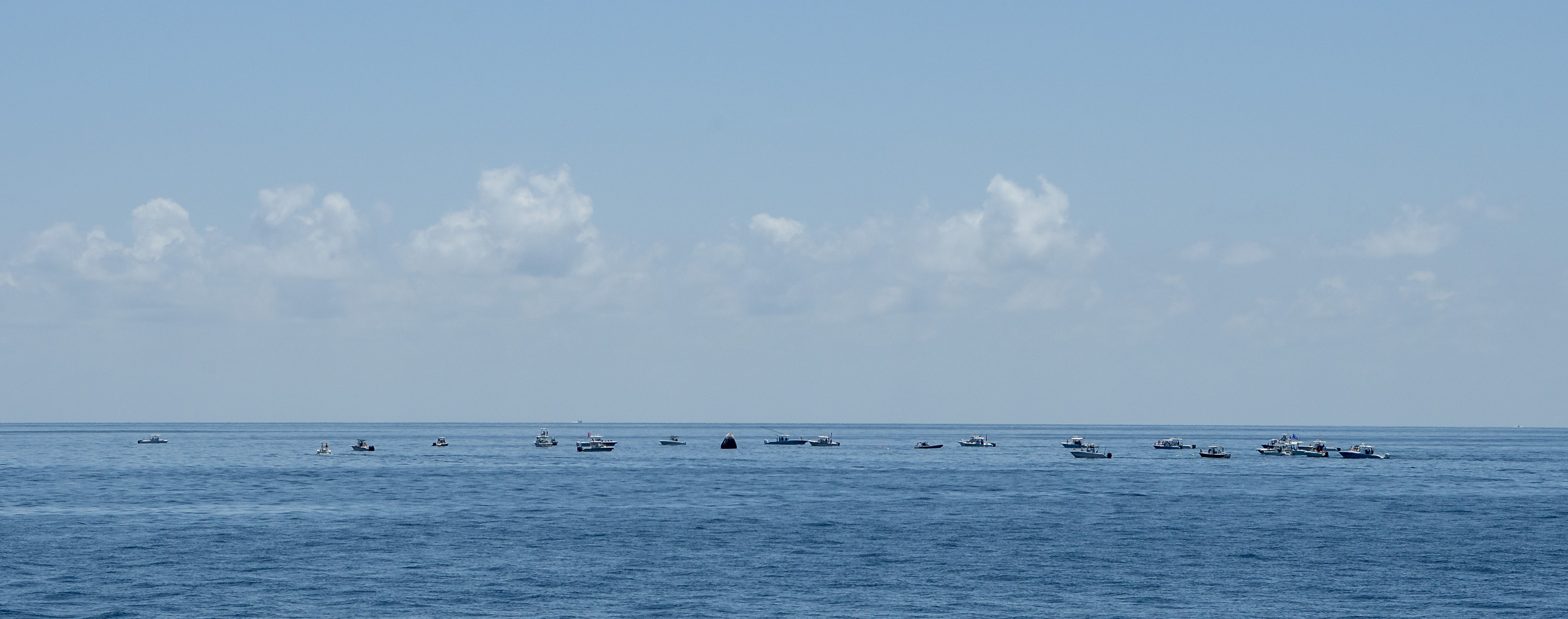
Large numbers of private boats create a circle around the Endeavour capsule.

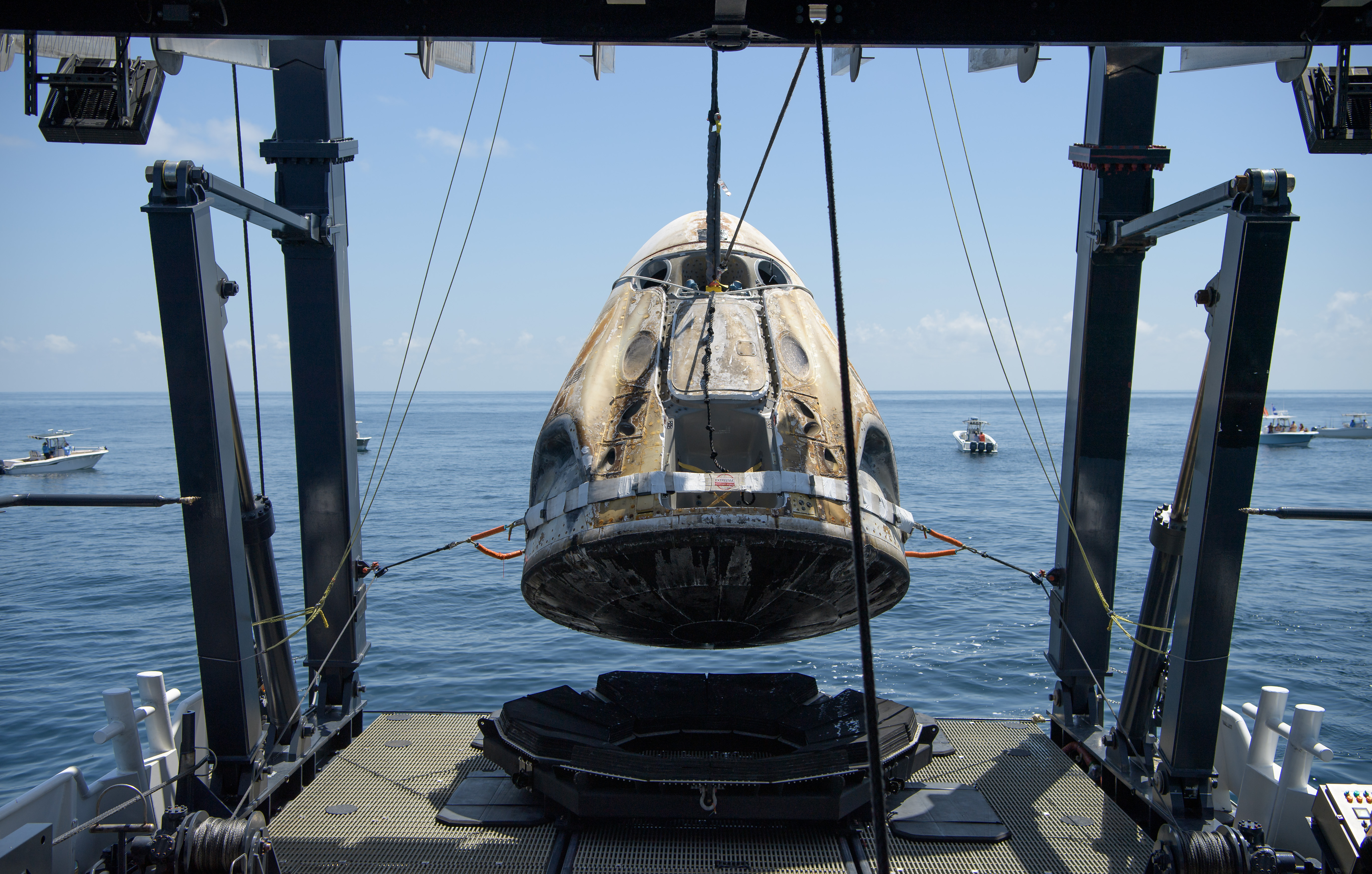
Endeavour being loaded onto the "nest" on board GO Navigator.

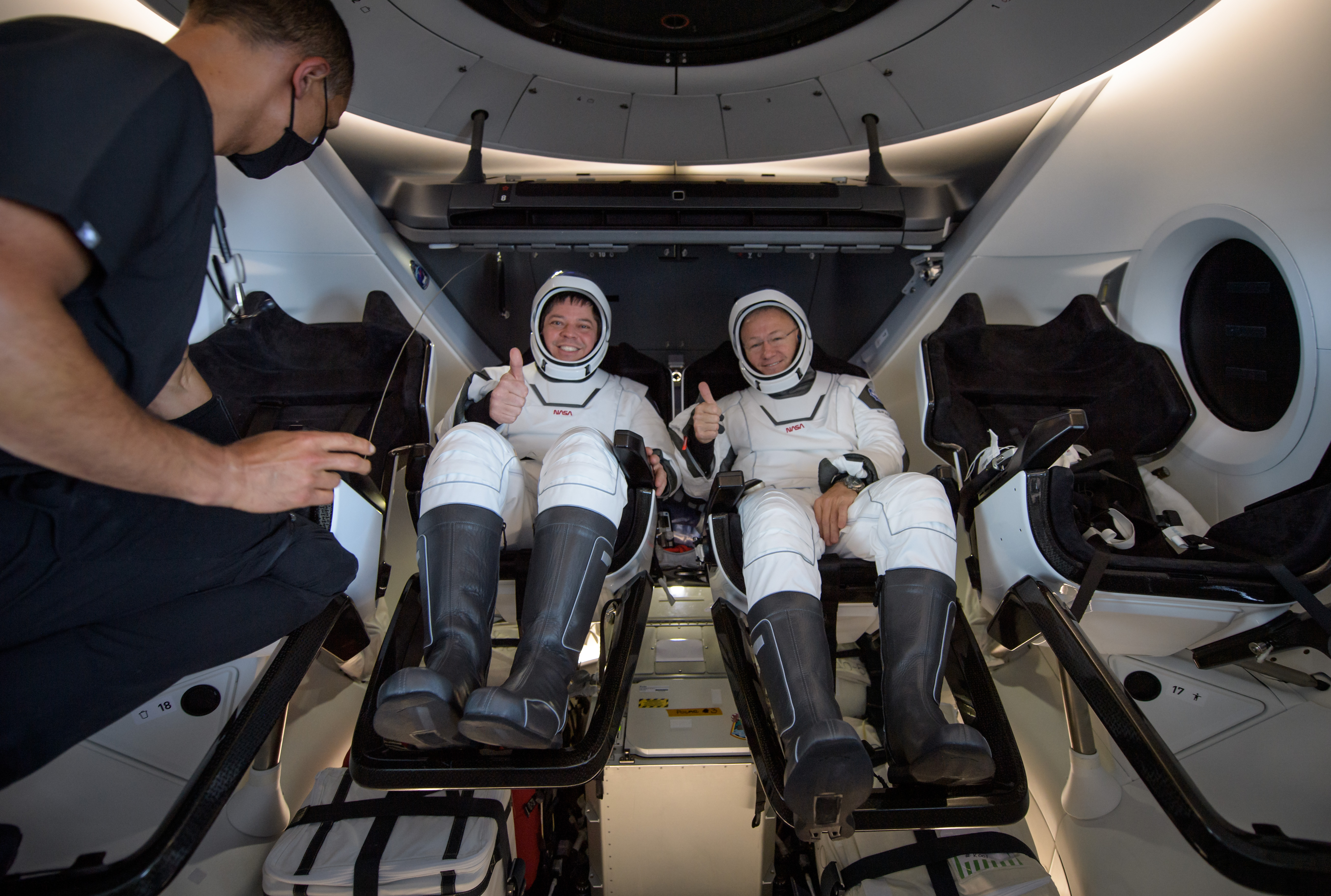
Behnken and Hurley inside Endeavour are greeted by SpaceX medical director Anil Menon on board GO Navigator.

=== Timeline ===
Note: all times in UTC

- T+00:00:00 (19:22:45, May 30, 2020) – the Crew Dragon spacecraft launches from Launch Complex 39A at Cape Canaveral, Florida.
- T+00:01:01 (19:23:46) – Max-Q
- T+00:02:38 (19:25:23) – MECO
- T+00:02:40 (19:25:25) – Stage separation of the Falcon 9.
- T+00:08:50 (19:31:35) – SECO
- T+00:12:08 (19:34:53) – Endeavour separates from the second stage.
- T+17:54 (13:56, May 31, 2020) – Crew Dragon reaches Waypoint 1 for docking with the ISS.
- T+18:54 (14:16) – Initial soft docking with the ISS.
- T+19:05 (14:27) – Hard docking with the ISS.
- T+21:39 (17:01) – Hatch opening.
- T+21:59 (17:22) – Behnken and Hurley board the ISS.
- T+27 days (June 26, 2020) – First spacewalk.
- T+32 days (July 1, 2020) – Second spacewalk.
- T+47 days (July 16, 2020) – Third spacewalk.
- T+52 days (July 21, 2020) – Fourth spacewalk.
- T+63 days, 09:08 (23:35, August 1, 2020) – Undocking from ISS.
- T+63 days, 23:25:21 (18:48:06, August 2, 2020) – Capsule return to Earth, splashdown, mission ends.
- T+64 days, 00:36 (19:59, August 2, 2020) – Crew recovery by GO Navigator.

=== Follow up mission of the capsule ===
Endeavour was refurbished and reused for the SpaceX Crew-2 mission that launched on April 23, 2021. Alongside, Bob's seat of the Crew Dragon Endeavor is used by his wife, K. Megan McArthur in Crew-2 mission. The intervening Crew Dragon mission, SpaceX Crew-1 SpaceX's first operational astronaut flight launched four Expedition 64 astronauts aboard Crew Dragon Resilience on November 16, 2020, at 00:27:17 UTC.

== See also ==
- Boeing Crew Flight Test, Boeing's first crewed mission of its capsule
- SpaceX Dragon – Family of SpaceX spacecraft
- List of Falcon 9 and Falcon Heavy launches
- Return to Space - Netflix documentary about SpaceX and Demo-2 mission
