= Bruce Blackburn =

American graphic designer (1938–2021)

- Born: Bruce Nelson Blackburn; June 2, 1938; Dallas, Texas, U.S.
- Died: February 1, 2021 (aged 82); Arvada, Colorado, U.S.
- Occupation: Graphic designer
- Notable work: Logotypes for NASA and the American Revolution Bicentennial

Bruce Blackburn (June 2, 1938 – February 1, 2021) was an American graphic designer, who was a designer of the National Aeronautics and Space Administration (NASA) logotype and the American Revolution Bicentennial star.

== Early life and education ==
Bruce Nelson Blackburn was born in Dallas, Texas, on June 2, 1938, to Buford Blackburn, an electrical engineer, and Ruby (née Caraway) Blackburn, a real estate agent. The couple also had a daughter, Sandra. He grew up in Evansville, Indiana, during which he pursued his interests in music and art. In 1956, he graduated from Evansville's Benjamin Bosse High School, and in 1961, he graduated with a Bachelor of Science degree in design from the University of Cincinnati. He served as a communications officer in the Navy.

== Work and career ==
NASA "worm" logo by Bruce Blackburn and Richard Danne

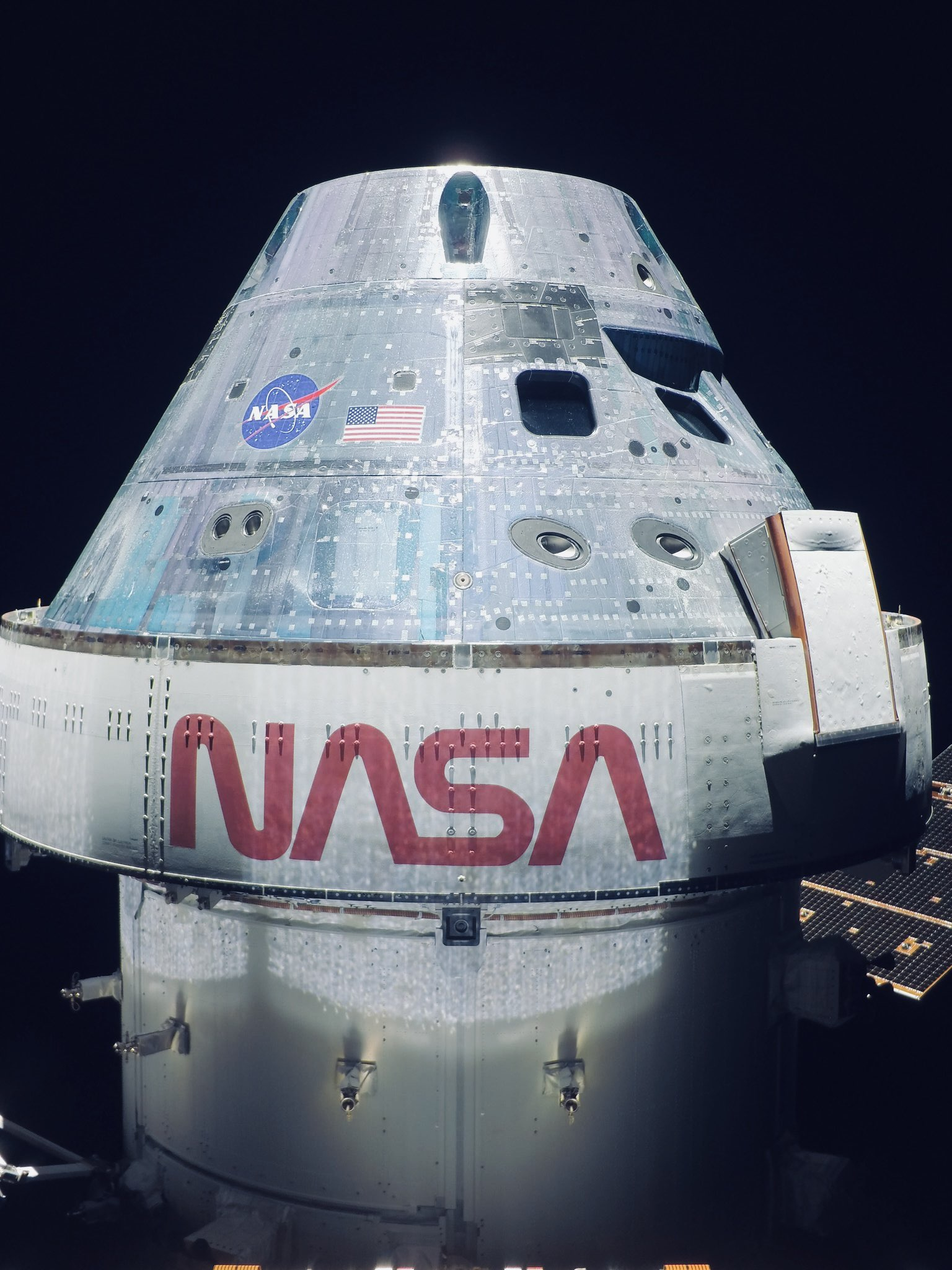
Orion Artemis I

Blackburn worked for Chermayeff & Geismar, a design firm in New York, by the late 1960s. In 1974, Blackburn was a designer, with his partner Richard Danne, of the 1976 NASA logo, also known as the "worm" for the shape of the red letters that make up the logo for astronaut's uniforms. Their design firm, Danne & Blackburn, was located in the state of New York. The worm logo has been used as a logo for NASA and the Orion spacecraft.

American Revolution Bicentennial symbol

He also created the symbol for the American Revolution Bicentennial celebration, using two stars (blue and red) to represent the multiple centuries with curved points for a less militaristic image than an outline of sharp points. It was used on a 1971 special issue postage stamp, as well as letterhead, tax returns, products, flags, and trains. In 1978, he was a seminar professor at the school of design at the University of Cincinnati.

Blackburn created logos for the Museum of Modern Art, Mobil, IBM, Champion Paper, RCA, and other organizations, like the Department of Transportation, and Army Corps of Engineers.

He established his own design firm, Blackburn & Associates in New York City in the 1980s. In the mid-1980s, he was president of the American Institute of Graphic Arts. He was awarded the Presidential Design Award by Ronald Reagan in 1984. In 2016, a short documentary Blackburn told of his work on the logo and his career that spanned over 40 years.

He died on February 1, 2021, in Arvada, Colorado.

== Legacy ==
In 2025, the NASA worm logo was included in Pirouette: Turning Points in Design, an exhibition at the Museum of Modern Art featuring "widely recognized design icons [...] highlighting pivotal moments in design history."

== Personal life ==
In 1979, he married Tina Harsham and they had a daughter and two sons.

Bruce Blackburn lived during his later years in Santa Fe, New Mexico, and Lakewood, Colorado.
