= NASA insignia =

Logo designs used by the National Aeronautics and Space Administration

NASA logos

1959 NASA seal, black and white

1961 NASA seal, color

NASA "meatball" insignia, primary logo 1959–1975, 1992–present

NASA "worm" logotype 1975–1992, re-instated as a secondary logo in 2020

The National Aeronautics and Space Administration (NASA) has three official insignias: the NASA seal, the NASA insignia (known as the "meatball") and the NASA logotype (known as the "worm"). The logotype was retired from official use from May 22, 1992, until April 3, 2020, when it was reinstated as a secondary logo.

== History ==
The NASA logo dates from 1959, when the National Advisory Committee for Aeronautics (NACA) transformed into an agency that advanced both astronautics and aeronautics—the National Aeronautics and Space Administration.

=== Seal ===
Often called the "NASA Administrator's Seal", the agency's seal is typically used for official correspondence, events and activities connected with the Administrator of NASA.

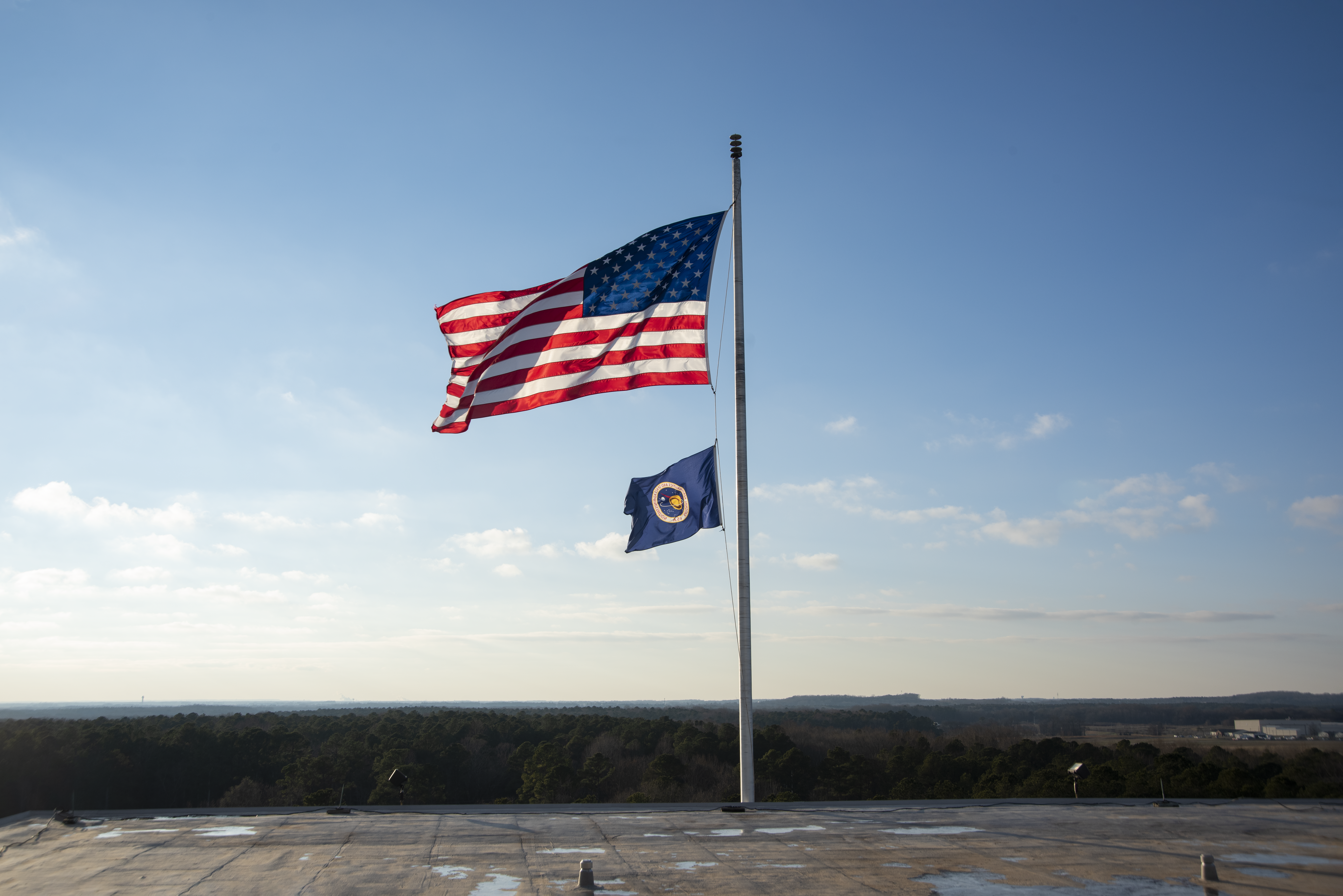
The NASA flag featuring the Administrator seal being flown atop Marshall Space Flight Center.

The design of the seal was approved with an executive order by President Dwight D. Eisenhower in 1959. The design was slightly modified, and colorized with an executive order by President John F. Kennedy in 1961.

In the Administrator seal, the yellow sphere represents a planet, the stars represent space, the red chevron is a wing representing aeronautics (the latest design in hypersonic wings at the time the logo was developed), and the white arc represents the path of an orbiting spacecraft.

=== "Meatball" insignia ===
The NASA insignia originated when NASA Administrator T. Keith Glennan asked James Modarelli of Lockheed for help creating a simplified version of the agency’s seal for informal uses such as signage and badges. The design process occurred alongside the finalization of the official seal. The resulting insignia omits the seal’s outer ring and inner elements, retaining the white stars, orbital path, and red chevron on a blue field, with large white letters "NASA".

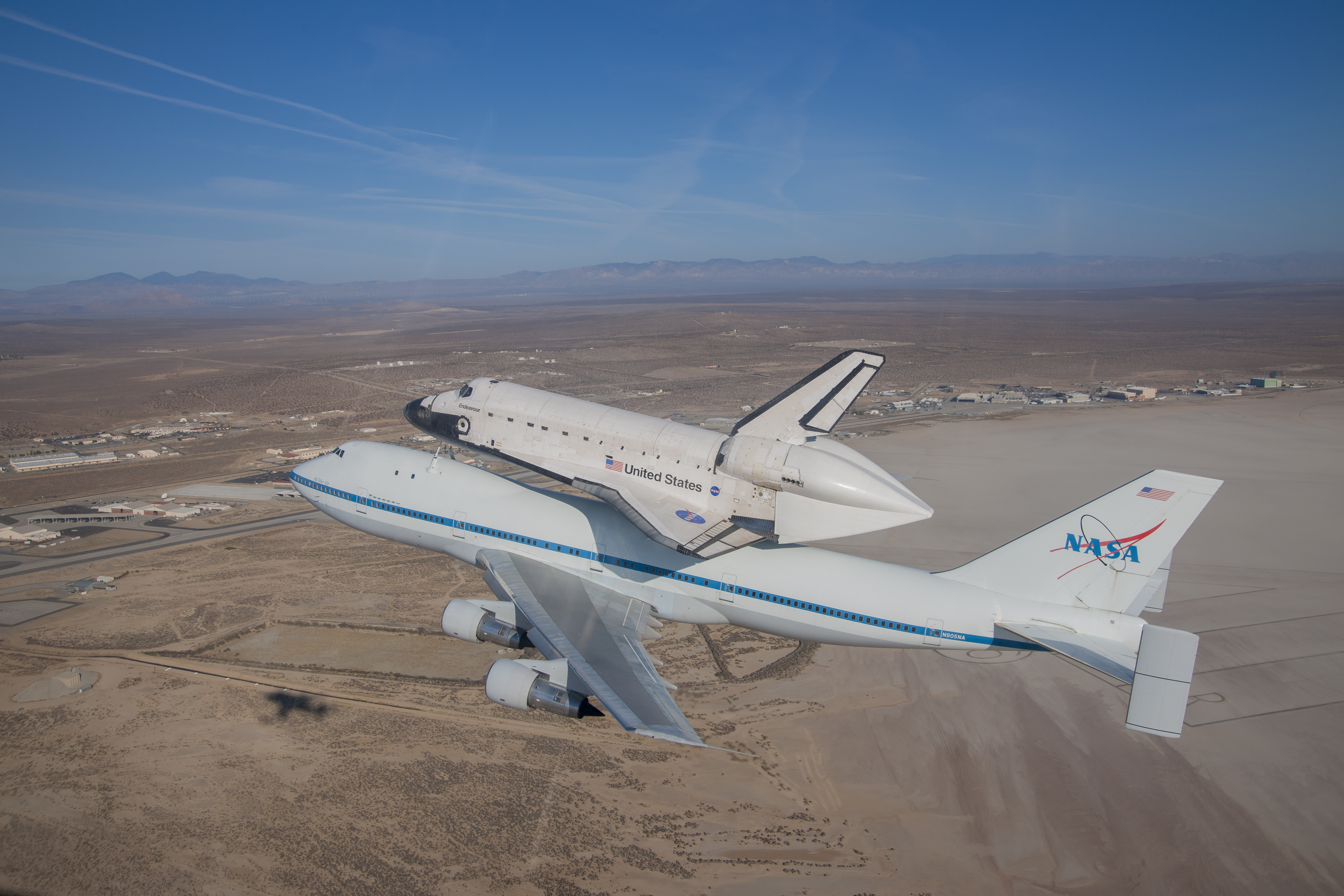
Space Shuttle Endeavour being carried by the Shuttle Carrier Aircraft in 2012. While the meatballs are decorated on the Space Shuttle's wing and fuselage, the Carrier Aircraft also featured the meatball-derived logotype on their tails.

The insignia was created in 1958 by George Neago, an industrial artist at the Lockheed Missiles Division in Palo Alto, California, under the supervision of Modarelli, who managed the division’s Reports Department. Modarelli later joined NASA as manager of the Reports Division at the Lewis Research Center in Cleveland, Ohio.

The insignia acquired the nickname "meatball" in 1975, reportedly coined by Frank Rowsome, head of technical publications at NASA Headquarters, to distinguish it from the agency's logotype. The term "meatball" in aeronautics refers to the glowing light used in optical landing system.

The NASA "meatball" insignia was retired from official use in 1975 and reinstated on May 22, 1992, by Administrator Daniel Goldin, who sought to boost morale among employees who had not accepted the "worm" logotype.

=== "Worm" logotype ===
In 1974, as part of the Federal Graphics Improvement Program of the National Endowment for the Arts, NASA commissioned Richard Danne and Bruce Blackburn to design a more modern logo. In 1975, the agency adopted the resulting modernist logotype, a red, stylized rendering of the letters "NASA". The horizontal bars of the "A"s are omitted, with the negative space suggesting the tip of a rocket. The logotype was derogatorily nicknamed the "worm" by employees who preferred the old insignia.

Danne and Blackburn also produced a Graphics Standards Manual, which later became widely regarded in the field of graphic design. In 2015, a Kickstarter campaign raised nearly $1 million to fund a hardcover reissue of the manual. NASA subsequently released a scanned version online.

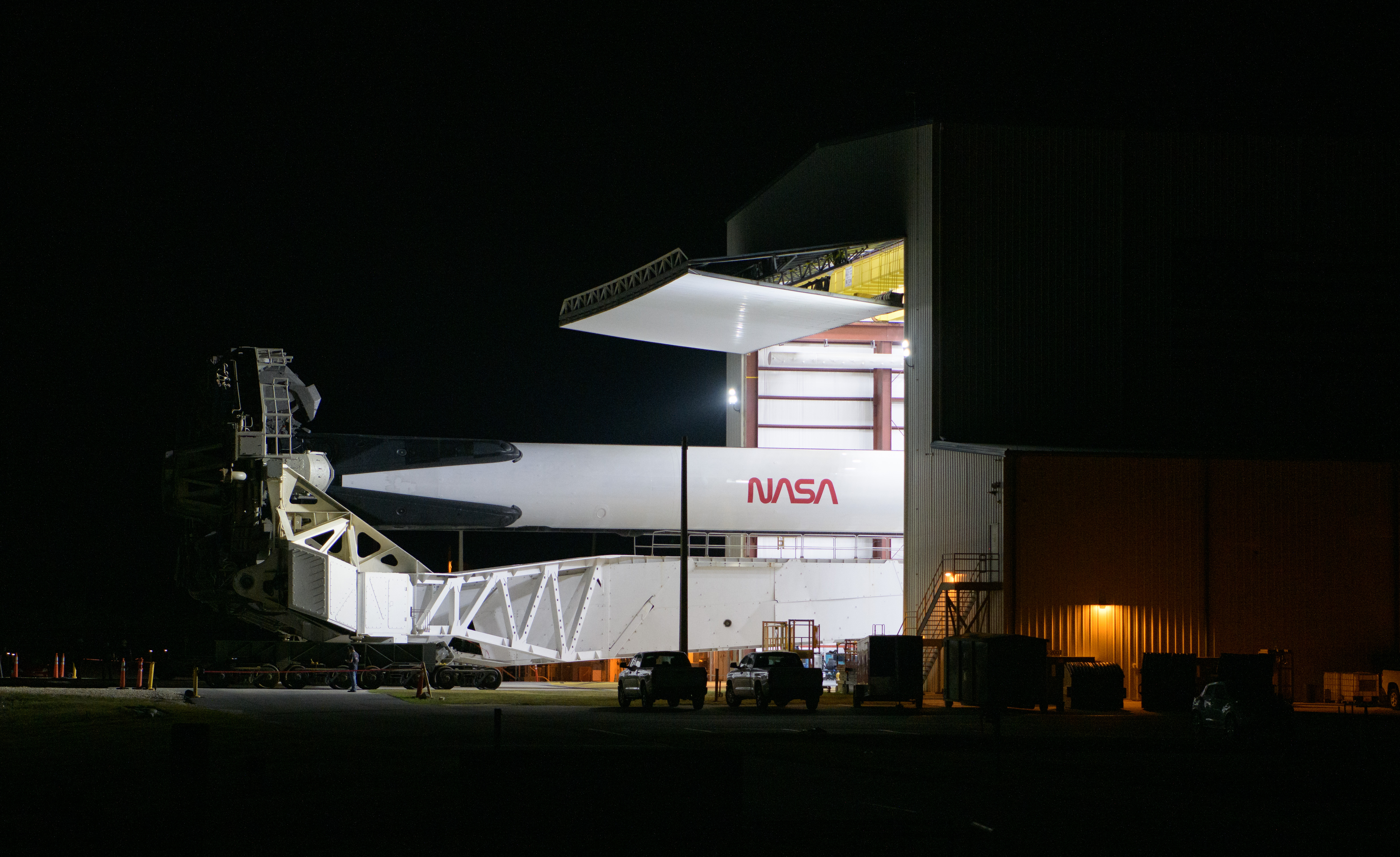
The 2020 rollout of Crew Demo-2 marking the revival of "the worm" typeface.

Following its retirement, the logotype remained in limited use for agency-approved commercial merchandising.

In 2020, the logotype was reintroduced by Administrator Jim Bridenstine and applied to the booster of SpaceX's Crew Dragon Demo-2 mission. NASA subsequently authorized the logotype for use as a supplemental graphic alongside the insignia when approved by agency leadership.

In 2025, the logotype was included in Pirouette: Turning Points in Design, an exhibition at the Museum of Modern Art highlighting "widely recognized design icons [...] highlighting pivotal moments in design history."

== Usage regulation ==
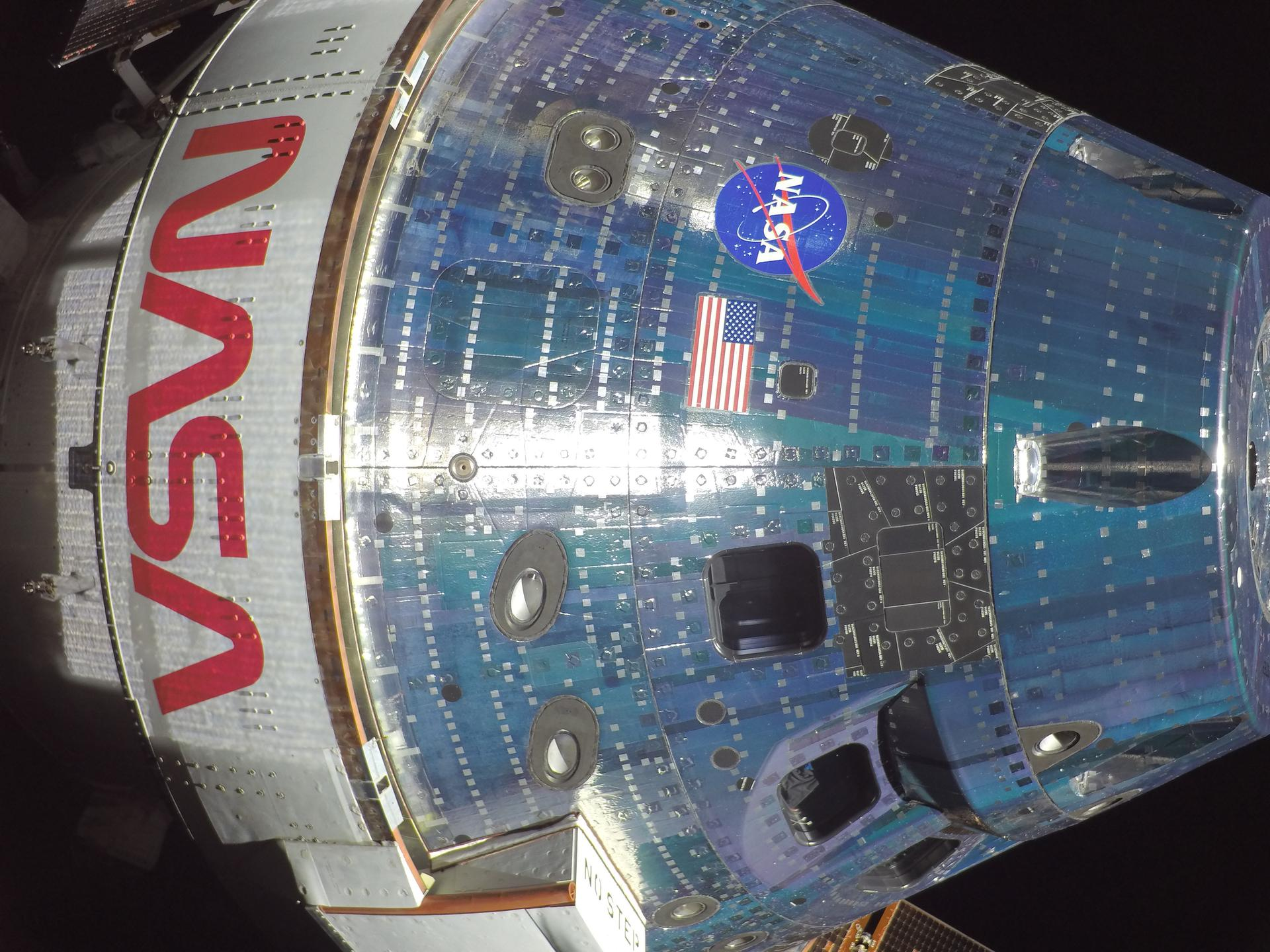
The "worm" and "meatball" on the European Service Module and Orion MPCV Integrity of Artemis II.

The official NASA seal is reserved for use in connection with the NASA Administrator. It is used in more formal traditional and ceremonial events such as award presentations and press conferences. According to NASA Headquarters, the seal should never be used with the NASA insignia, since the two elements are intended for different purposes and are visually incompatible when seen side by side.

Since its reintroduction in 2020, the "worm" logotype has been used only for human spaceflight-related activities, and often appears alongside the "meatball" insignia.

The seal, insignia, and logotype are not in the public domain. Their usage is restricted under Code of Federal Regulations 14 CFR 1221.

The colors used in the insignia are the following:

Red

- Pantone 185
- Process 0C, 100M, 100Y, 0K
- RGB 252R, 61G, 33B
- HEX #FC3D21

Blue

- Pantone 286
- Process 100C, 060M, 0Y, 0K
- RGB 11R, 61G, 145B
- HEX #0B3D91

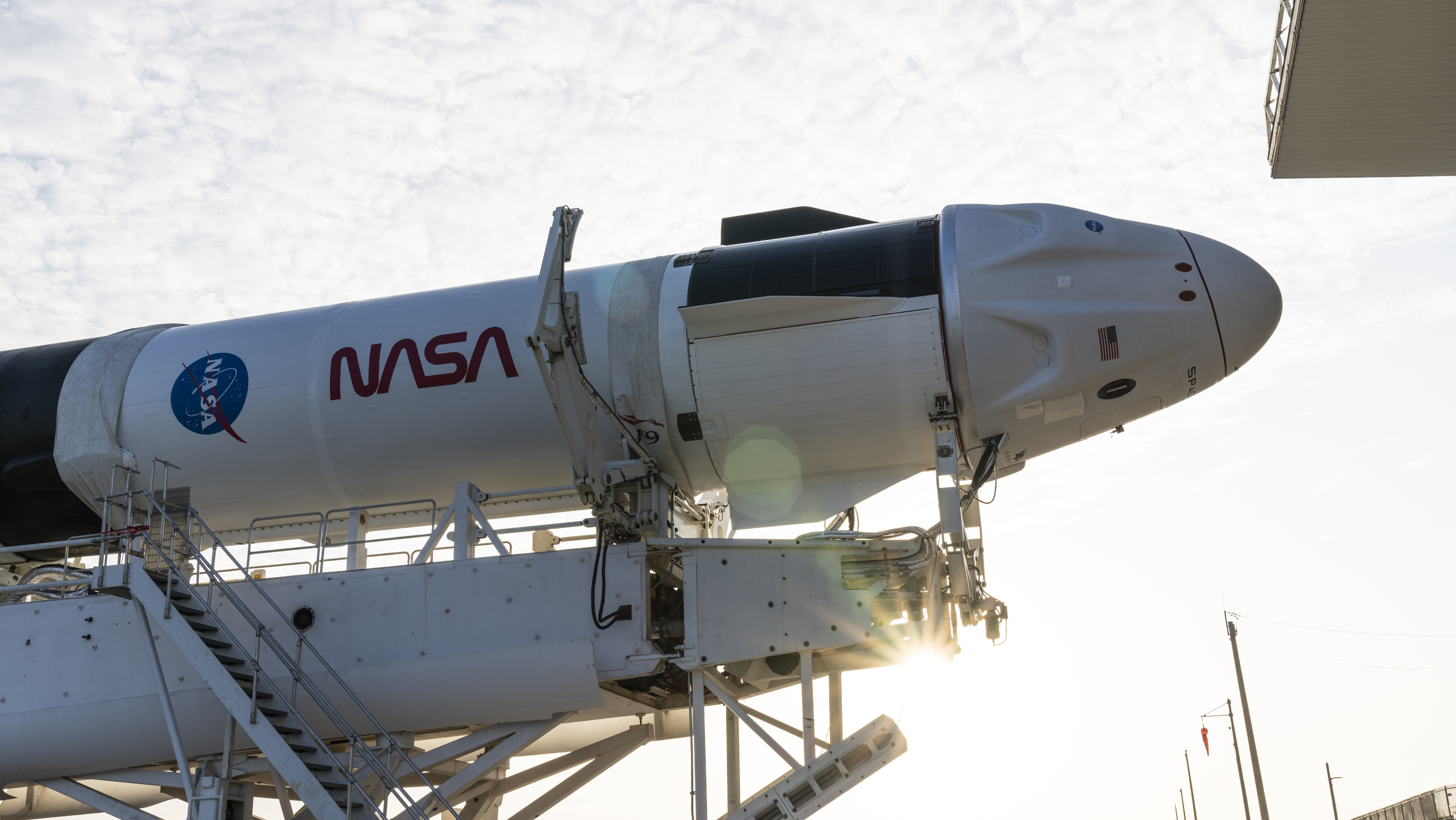
The "meatball" and "worm" decorating SpaceX Crew-2's launch vehicle.

The red color used for the logotype is Pantone 179; HEX #E03C31.

== Popularity ==
The NASA logos are popular insignias and have been used widely in American culture, as well as representing the United States and its capabilities in space. Especially since 2017, NASA insignia have become popular fashion elements, after the fashion company Coach received permission for using the then-retired "worm" logo on a line of purses and clothing. After that, additional companies have used the "worm" logo in their designs, and NASA has reintroduced its official use. Star Trek cited NASA as an inspiration for its symbols.

== See also ==
- Space Force Delta
- Seal of the United States Space Force
- Flag of the United States Space Force
- List of works in the Museum of Modern Art
