= Soyuz flight VS22 =

April 2019 flight of a Soyuz-ST-B operated by Arianespace

- Artwork featured on visitors' brochures

Soyuz-ST-B launch
- Launch: 4 April 2019, 17:03:37 UTC
- Operator: Arianespace
- Pad: Kourou ELS
- Payload: O3b × 4
- Outcome: Success

Arianespace Soyuz launches

Soyuz flight VS22 (French: Soyuz vol VS22) was a rocket launch conducted by multinational launch service provider Arianespace. It was the sixteenth launch of a Soyuz-ST-B launch vehicle, and the 22nd launch of a Soyuz-2 series launch vehicle from the Ensemble de Lancement Soyouz at the Guiana Space Centre. After two scheduling delays and a 33-minute logistical delay, the rocket lifted off on 4 April 2019, and successfully delivered to medium Earth orbit the final four satellites in the O3b broadband satellite constellation, which services Latin America, Africa, and Oceania. After four previous Soyuz flights delivered the constellation's first sixteen satellites, the launch increased the constellation's throughput by 26 per cent. The flight marked the second occasion in which two Soyuz-2 launch vehicles were launched on the same day, occurring hours after the launch of Progress MS-11 from the Baikonur Cosmodrome.

== Rocket ==
The launch vehicle used in Soyuz flight VS22 was a Soyuz-ST-B – a variant of the Soyuz-2.1b which utilizes a 4.1 × 11.4 metre "ST" payload fairing. The Soyuz-2.1b itself is a variant of the Soyuz-2 family that utilizes a RD-0124 engine for the Blok-I stage, rather than the older RD-0110 engine used on the Soyuz-2.1a. The RD-0124 grants 34 more seconds of specific impulse than its predecessor, improving the rocket's performance. Manufactured at the Progress Rocket Space Centre in Samara, Russia, the rocket's components had been adapted for the warmer climate at the Guiana Space Centre (Kourou). Its boosters and Blok-A first stage had also been equipped with pyrotechnic charges to ensure they would sink to the sea floor upon impact with the ocean. In contrast to the horizontal payload integration performed on Soyuz-2 rockets at the Baikonur Cosmodrome, the payload is integrated vertically with the Soyuz-ST-B at Kourou, via a mobile service tower at the Ensemble de Lancement Soyouz (ELS) launch pad.

== Payload ==
Communications satellite services company SES S.A. was the sole customer for Soyuz flight VS22, commissioning a launch of four O3b satellites. O3b is a broadband satellite constellation in non-geostationary orbit, which provides "fiber-like, high-performance data connectivity services" to Africa, Latin America, and Oceania. Each satellite weighed around 700 kilograms (1,500 lb), totaling a payload mass of 3,198 kilograms (7,050 lb). Flight VS22 is the fifth launch of an O3b satellite cluster – previous launches include Soyuz flights VS05 in June 2013, VS08 in July 2014, VS10 in December 2014, and VS18 in March 2018. The launch increased the number of satellites in the constellation from 16 to 20, improving the constellation's bandwidth and performance, although it did not significantly increase the constellation's coverage area of 50° north and south of the equator. Designed to operate in the Ka band, each of the O3b satellites has a maximum throughput of 10–20 gigabits per second, and the four satellites launched aboard flight VS22 increased the total throughput of the constellation by 26 per cent. The launch completed the "first generation" of 20 O3b satellites – SES plans to succeed the constellation with the O3b mPOWER constellation, which will have a total throughput of up to 10 terabits per second. The satellites carried aboard flight VS22 are the 58–61st SES satellites to be commissioned for launch by Arianespace. They were also the 156–159th spacecraft launched by Arianespace to be manufactured by Thales Alenia Space and its predecessors.

== Flight ==
External videos
- Highlights of Soyuz flight VS22 (2:31) by Arianespace

Soyuz flight VS22 was delayed twice from its intended launch date on 26 March 2019; first to 29 March and later to 4 April. The Soyuz-ST-B launch vehicle was rolled out to Kourou's ELS launch pad on 1 April. After a 33-minute delay to allow for further checks on ground systems, it lifted off at 17:03:37 Coordinated Universal Time (UTC) on 4 April 2019, in an eastward direction over the Atlantic Ocean. The rocket's boosters and first two stages were expended in ten minutes, while the Fregat upper stage's S5.92 engine fired three times to place the Fregat and the O3b satellites aboard into a near-circular medium Earth orbit above the equator, at an altitude of 7,830 kilometres (4,870 mi). The lower orbit, roughly twenty times the height of the International Space Station (ISS) and a fourth of the altitude of typical geostationary satellites, allows for decreased latency between the satellites and the ground. The satellites were deployed two at a time, with the first set of satellites deployed at 19:03 UTC, and the second set 22 minutes later at 19:25 UTC. The flight lasted 2 hours and 22 minutes. After the mission, one final burn placed the Fregat into a controlled decaying orbit. Flight VS22 was the 22nd launch of a Soyuz-2 vehicle from Kourou since launches from the complex began in October 2011, and the fourth Soyuz-2 launch by Arianespace in five months. Launch frequency of the Soyuz-2 increased dramatically with the vehicle's usage in the OneWeb satellite programme, which started with Arianespace's previous Soyuz flight. Flight VS22 occurred five-and-a-half hours after the launch of a Soyuz-2.1a rocket from Baikonur that carried the Progress MS spacecraft 441 to the ISS during the Progress MS-11 mission, marking the second time that two Soyuz-2 rockets launched on the same day; the launch of the first four O3b satellites from Kourou, and Resurs-P No.1 from Baikonur, occurred within two hours of each other on 25 June 2013.

== See also ==
- List of R-7 launches (2015–2019)
- List of Soyuz-2 launches
