= Alcan Systems =

German telecommunications company

ALCAN Systems GmbH
- Type: GmbH
- Industry: Telecommunications
- Founded: 2016
- Founder: Onur H. Karabey (CEO); Esat M. Sibay (CFO); A. Burak Olcen (CPO); Rolf Jakoby
- Headquarters: Darmstadt, Germany
- Website: www.alcansystems.com

ALCAN Systems GmbH is a telecommunications company based in Darmstadt, Germany. The company is develops antenna systems for fixed, mobile, cellular and satellite-communication.

ALCAN’s technology is based on liquid crystal (LC) based phased-arrays that are capable of operating in the millimeter and microwave bands of the RF spectrum.

== History ==
ALCAN (Adaptive Liquid Crystal Antenna) Systems’ technology is based on original research initiated at the Institute for Microwave Engineering and Photonics (IMP) at Technische Universität Darmstadt. Professor Rolf Jakoby, director of the IMP and later co-founder of ALCAN Systems, started his research on liquid crystals in radio-frequency applications in 1999. He is considered the father of LC RF applications.

Onur H. Karabey joined Jakoby’s research team as a research assistant and started working on his PhD thesis in 2009. Dr. Karabey completed his research in 2012 and published his results under the title “Electronic Beam Steering and Polarization Agile Planar Antennas in Liquid Crystal Technology” in 2014.

In 2014, ALCAN began as a research project at TU Darmstadt and seed funding of €650,000 for the project was provided by EXIST of the Federal Ministry for Economic Affairs and Energy.

In 2016, the project team spun out of the university and became an independent company. ALCAN Systems was founded by Onur H. Karabey, A. Burak Olcen, Esat M. Sibay, and Rolf Jakoby.

At the end of 2016, ALCAN raised €7.5 million in a Series A funding round. The investment was made by a consortium consisting of Merck, SES, and SPC.

In 2023, ALCAN Systems GmbH was liquidated.

== Patented technology ==
ALCAN’s beam steering capability uses a liquid crystal layer inside a phased-array antenna. The liquid crystal is controlled by an electric field that changes the direction of the received or transmitted beam without the antenna physically turning.

The antennae will consist of separate receiving and transmitting apertures operating at Ku or Ka band. The switching time of the antenna between two satellites will be under 50 ms, which will enable the antennae to meet the requirements of MEO and LEO constellation satellites. In 2018, ALCAN successfully field tested the world’s first liquid crystal-based phased array antenna for satellite communication.

== Partnerships ==
=== Partnership with SES ===
In April 2018, ALCAN was announced as a technical partner of SES Networks. ALCAN will develop an antenna for SES’s new O3b mPOWER satellites.

== Business model ==
ALCAN’s business model is to develop antennae based on requirements provided by satellite operators and service providers. ALCAN is targeting a price range of under $1,000 for the consumer segment and under $10,000 for the enterprise segment. These targets can be achieved by using existing LCD production lines to produce the required liquid crystal phase shifter panels that go into the antenna.

Furthermore, ALCAN plans to produce smaller consumer antennas for the land mobile, maritime and home broadband markets that will develop due to the start of LEO/MEO satellites and the 5G rollout.
