= O3b (disambiguation) =

O3b is a telecommunications satellite system

O3b may also refer to:

- O3b mPOWER, a second generation satellite system
- O3b Networks (2007–2017) a defunct satellite operator
