= Emergency response unit =

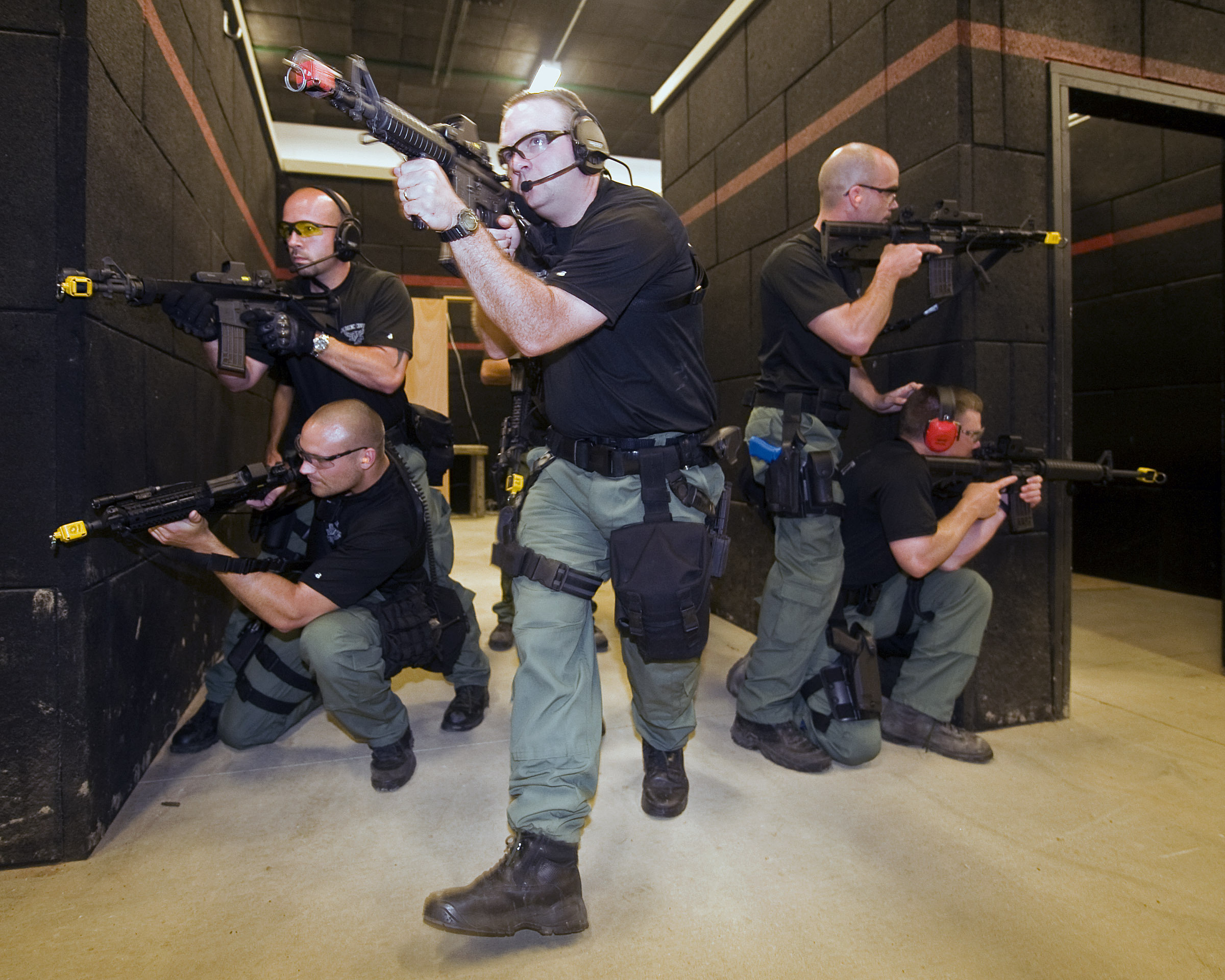
Officers of the Noblesville, Indiana, Police Department's Emergency Response Unit

An emergency response unit is a name for a law enforcement or other civil government entity that is trained and equipped to respond quickly to emergency situations.

In some instances, it can be a designation given to a special weapons and tactics unit, although it can also be used for units intended to respond to natural disasters and other situations not requiring the use of weaponry.

== Units ==
Below are examples of units that use the ERU moniker:

- Garda Emergency Response Unit, a specialist armed tactical intervention team of Ireland's police
- Emergency Response Unit (IFRC), pre-trained teams of specialist volunteers of the International Federation of Red Cross and Red Crescent Societies
- Emergency Response Unit (Cyprus), a division within the Cyprus police
- Emergency Response Unit (Liberia)
- London Underground emergency response unit
