= Honeywell JetWave =

Hardware which enables global in-flight Wi-Fi connectivity

Honeywell's JetWave is a piece of satellite communications hardware produced by Honeywell that enables global in-flight internet connectivity. Its connectivity is provided using Inmarsat’s GX Aviation network. The JetWave platform is used in business and general aviation, as well as defense and commercial airline users.

== History ==
In 2012, Honeywell announced it would provide Inmarsat with the hardware for its GX Ka-band in-flight connectivity network. The Ka-band (pronounced either "kay-ay band" or "ka band") is a portion of the microwave part of the electromagnetic spectrum defined as frequencies in the range 27.5 to 31 gigahertz (GHz). In satellite communications, the Ka-band allows higher bandwidth communication.

In 2017, after five years and more than 180 flight hours and testing, JetWave was launched as part of GX Aviation with Lufthansa Group. Honeywell’s JetWave was the exclusive terminal hardware option for the Inmarsat GX Aviation network; however, the exclusivity clause in that contract has expired.

In July 2019, the United States Air Force selected Honeywell’s JetWave satcom system for 70 of its C-17 Globemaster III cargo planes. In December 2019, it was reported that six AirAsia aircraft had been fitted with Inmarsat’s GX Aviation Ka-band connectivity system and is slated to be implemented fleetwide across AirAsia’s Airbus A320 and A330 models in 2020, requiring installation of JetWave atop AirAsia’s fuselages. Today, Honeywell’s JetWave hardware is installed on over 1,000 aircraft worldwide.

In August 2021, the Civil Aviation Administration of China approved a validation of Honeywell’s MCS-8420 JetWave satellite connectivity system for Airbus 320 aircraft.

In December 2021, Honeywell, SES, and Hughes Network Systems demonstrated multi-orbit high-speed airborne connectivity for military customers using Honeywell’s JetWave MCX terminal with a Hughes HM-series modem, and SES satellites in both medium Earth orbit (MEO) and geostationary orbit (GEO). The tests achieved full duplex data rates of more than 40 megabits per second via a number of SES' (GEO) satellites including GovSat-1, and the high-throughput, low-latency O3b MEO satellite constellation, with connections moving between GEO/MEO links in under 30 sec.

== Uses ==
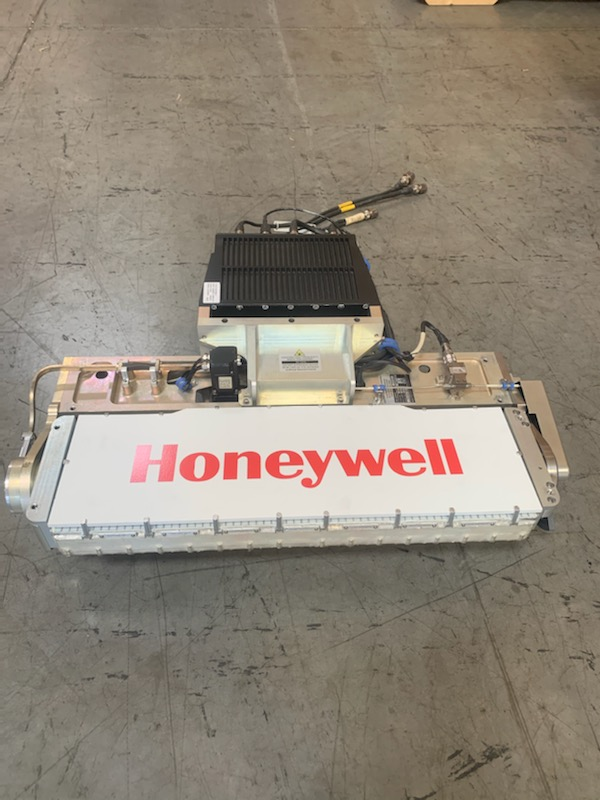
JetWave Fuselage Mount Antenna - Front

=== Commercial aviation ===
Honeywell’s JetWave enables air transport and regional aircraft to connect to Inmarsat’s GX Aviation network. The multichannel satellite (MSC) JetWave terminals share the same antenna controller, modem and router hardware with the business market, but have an MCS-8200 fuselage-mounted antenna.

=== Business aviation ===
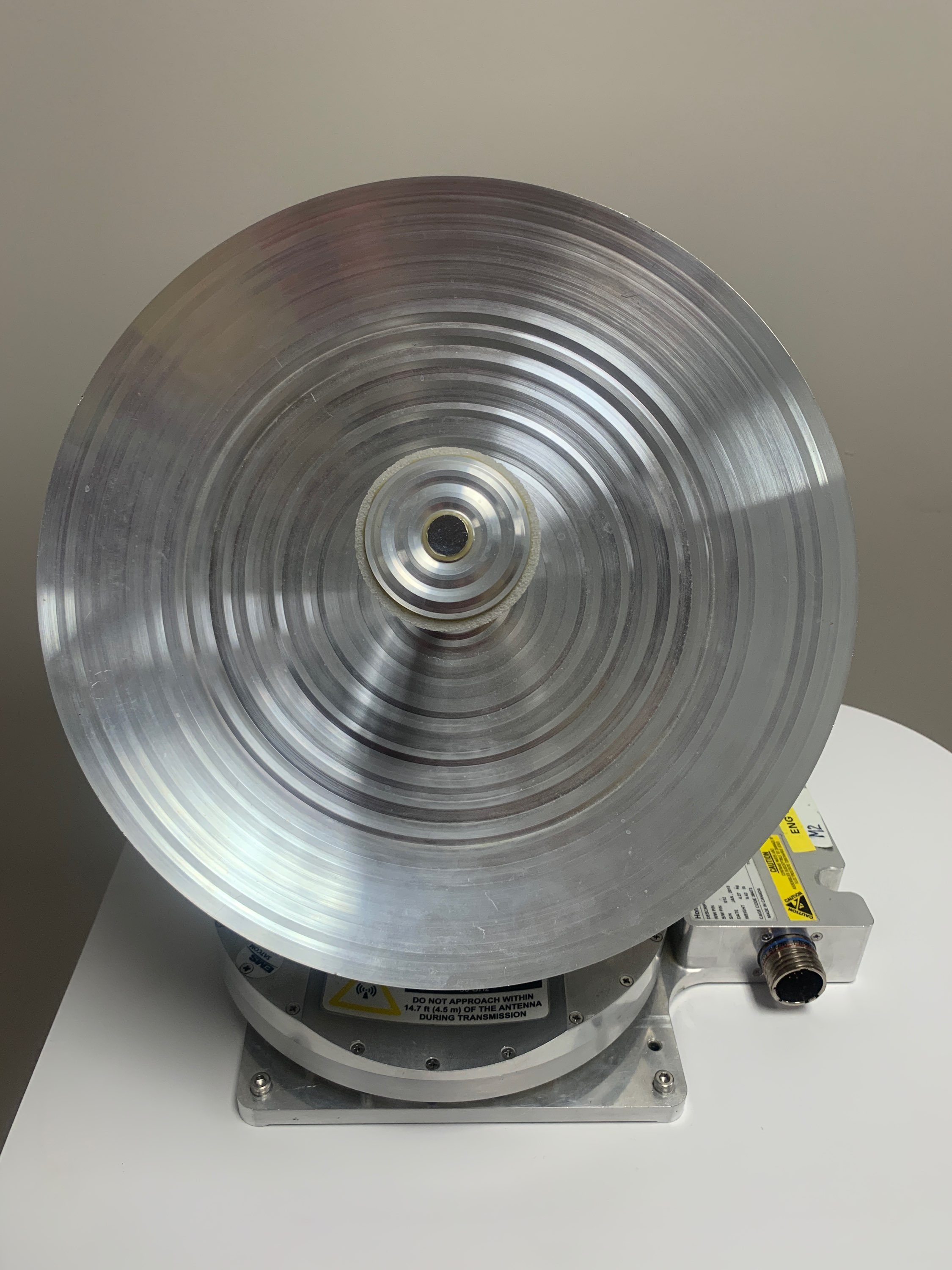
JetWave Tail Mount Antenna - Business Aviation - Front

Honeywell’s JetWave hardware allows users to connect to Inmarsat’s Jet ConneX, a business aviation broadband connectivity offering to provide Wi-Fi for connected devices. JetWave offers a tail-mount antenna for business jets.

=== Defense ===
Honeywell’s JetWave satellite communications system for defense allows users to connect to the Inmarsat GX network, offering global coverage for military airborne operators, including over water, over nontraditional flight paths and in remote areas.

JetWave and the Inmarsat GX network enable mission-critical applications like real-time weather; videoconferencing; large file transfers; encryption capabilities; in-flight briefings; intelligence, surveillance, and reconnaissance video; and secure communications. JetWave is configurable for a variety of military platforms and offers antennas for large and small airframes.
