= Ramin Kohankhaki =

Iranian nurse, humanitarian and author

- Education: Tehran University of Medical Sciences

Ramin Kohankhaki is an Iranian nurse, Certified first responder, humanitarian and author. He received the Florence Nightingale Medal in 2015 for her work in nursing.

== Career ==
In 1987, Kohankhaki was accepted to the Tehran University of Medical Sciences in Tehran, Iran. In 1991, he joined the Emergency Response Unit (IFRC). He has worked as a nurse and Certified first responder in field projects in Iraq, Afghanistan, Indonesia, Lebanon, Libya, Yemen, Somalia and Mogadishu. He is an active member of the IRCS in disaster situations and in areas of public health and nursing education. He has launched BHCU and RDH in hospitals in Iraq and Lebanon.

== Honours ==
He won the Florence Nightingale Medal 2015, which recognizes exceptional courage and devotion to victims of armed conflict or natural disaster.
