= Satellite internet access =

Satellite-provided internet

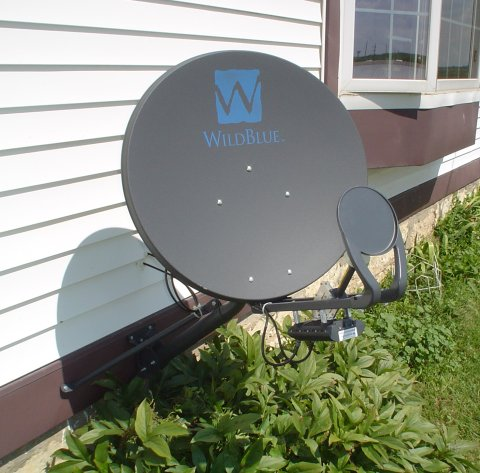
A WildBlue satellite dish on the side of a house for receiving internet

Satellite internet access is internet access provided through communication satellites; if it can sustain high speeds, it is termed satellite broadband. Modern consumer grade satellite internet service is typically provided to individual users through geostationary satellites that can offer relatively high data speeds, with newer satellites using the K_{u} band to achieve downstream data speeds up to 506 Mbit/s. In addition, new satellite internet constellations are being developed in low-earth orbit to enable low-latency internet access from space.

== History ==
Following the launch of the first satellite, Sputnik 1, by the Soviet Union in October 1957, the US successfully launched the Explorer 1 satellite in 1958. The first commercial communications satellite was Telstar 1, built by Bell Labs and launched in July 1962.

The idea of a geosynchronous satellite – one that could orbit the Earth above the equator and remain fixed by following the Earth's rotation – was first proposed by Herman Potočnik in 1928 and popularised by the science fiction author Arthur C. Clarke in a paper in Wireless World in 1945. The first satellite to successfully reach geostationary orbit was Syncom3, built by Hughes Aircraft for NASA and launched on August 19, 1963. Succeeding generations of communications satellites featuring larger capacities and improved performance characteristics were adopted for use in television delivery, military applications and telecommunications purposes. Following the invention of the internet and the World Wide Web, geostationary satellites attracted interest as a potential means of providing internet access.

A significant enabler of satellite-delivered internet has been the opening up of the K_{a} band for satellites. In December 1993, Hughes Aircraft Co. filed with the Federal Communications Commission for a license to launch the first K_{a}-band satellite, Spaceway. In 1995, the FCC issued a call for more K_{a}-band satellite applications, attracting applications from 15 companies. Among those were EchoStar, Lockheed Martin, GE-Americom, Motorola and KaStar Satellite, which later became WildBlue, which then became Viasat.

Among prominent aspirants in the early-stage satellite internet sector was Teledesic, an ambitious and ultimately failed project funded in part by Microsoft that ended up costing more than $9 billion. Teledesic's idea was to create a satellite internet constellation of hundreds of low-orbiting satellites in the K_{a}-band frequency, providing inexpensive internet access with download speeds of up to 720 Mbit/s. However, the project was abandoned in 2003. Teledesic's failure, coupled with the bankruptcy filings of the satellite communications providers Iridium Communications Inc. and Globalstar, dampened marketplace enthusiasm for satellite internet development. The first internet-ready satellite for consumers was launched in September 2003.

In 2004, with the launch of Anik F2, the first high-throughput satellite, a class of next-generation satellites providing improved capacity and bandwidth became operational. More recently, high throughput satellites such as ViaSat's ViaSat-1 satellite in 2011 and HughesNet's Jupiter in 2012 have achieved further improvements, elevating downstream data rates from 1 to 3 Mbit/s up to 12 to 15 Mbit/s and beyond. Internet access services tied to these satellites are targeted largely to rural residents as an alternative to internet service via dial-up, ADSL or classic FSSes.

In 2013, the first four satellites of the O3b constellation were launched into medium Earth orbit (MEO) to provide internet access to the "other three billion" people without stable internet access at that time. Over the next six years, 16 further satellites joined the constellation, now owned and operated by SES.

Since 2014, a rising number of companies announced working on internet access using satellite constellations in low Earth orbit. SpaceX, OneWeb and Amazon all planned to launch more than 1000 satellites each. OneWeb alone raised $1.7 billion by February 2017 for the project, and SpaceX raised over one billion in the first half of 2019 for their service called Starlink. They expected more than $30 billion in revenue by 2025 from its satellite constellation. Starlink, as of February 2024, has 5,402 operational satellites in orbit.

Many planned constellations employ laser communication for inter-satellite links to effectively create a space-based internet backbone.

As of 2017, airlines such as Delta and American have been introducing satellite internet as a means of combating limited bandwidth on airplanes and offering passengers usable internet speeds.

In September 2017, SES announced the next generation of O3b satellites and service, named O3b mPOWER, a constellation of seven MEO satellites to deliver 10 terabits of capacity globally through 30,000 spot beams for broadband internet services. The number of O3b mPOWER satellites ordered was subsequently increased to 11 and then 13, and on 16 December 2022, the first two O3b mPOWER satellites were successfully launched, with four more in 2023, and the service began operations alongside the existing O3b constellation in April 2024. Two further satellites have since joined the constellation, launched in 2024

Consumers experienced performance increases in the 2020s, largely based on the decision of services like Starlink to deploy satellites at the low earth orbit level, which allowed for much lower latency than internet satellites deployed at the geostationary level, as they traditionally were.

== Companies and market ==
=== United States ===
As of 2024, companies providing home internet service in the United States via satellite included ViaSat, through its Exede brand, EchoStar, through subsidiary HughesNet, Starlink, and Amazon Leo. Operators of non-geostationary satellite internet constellations must demonstrate compliance with equivalent power flux density (EPFD) limits established by the International Telecommunication Union (ITU).

=== European Union ===
The EU plans to commence the IRIS² project in the 2020s.

=== China ===
As of 2023, China is in the process of developing its own, state-owned, satellite internet constellation, run by Chinasat.

=== India ===
As of 2023, India’s main offerings in the space were Oneweb and JioSpaceFiber, with the country considering licenses for Starlink and Project Kuiper.

== Function ==
How satellite internet works

Satellite internet generally relies on three primary components: a satellite – historically in geostationary orbit (or GEO) but now increasingly in Low Earth orbit (LEO) or Medium Earth orbit MEO) – a number of ground stations known as gateways that relay Internet data to and from the satellite via radio waves (microwave), and further ground stations to serve each subscriber, with a small antenna and transceiver. Other components of a satellite Internet system include a modem at the user end which links the user's network with the transceiver, and a centralized network operations centre (NOC) for monitoring the entire system. Working in concert with a broadband gateway, the satellite operates a Star network topology where all network communication passes through the network's hub processor, which is at the centre of the star. With this configuration, the number of ground stations that can be connected to the hub is virtually limitless.

=== Satellite ===
Marketed as the centre of the new broadband satellite networks are a new generation of high-powered GEO satellites positioned 35,786 kilometres (22,236 mi) above the equator, operating in K_{a}-band (18.3–30 GHz) mode. These new purpose-built satellites are designed and optimized for broadband applications, employing many narrow spot beams, which target a much smaller area than the broad beams used by earlier communication satellites. This spot beam technology allows satellites to reuse assigned bandwidth multiple times which can enable them to achieve much higher overall capacity than conventional broad beam satellites. The spot beams can also increase performance and consequential capacity by focusing more power and increased receiver sensitivity into defined concentrated areas. Spot beams are designated as one of two types: subscriber spot beams, which transmit to and from the subscriber-side terminal, and gateway spot beams, which transmit to/from a service provider ground station. Note that moving off the tight footprint of a spotbeam can degrade performance significantly. Also, spotbeams can make the use of other significant new technologies impossible, including 'Carrier in Carrier' modulation.

In conjunction with the satellite's spot-beam technology, a bent-pipe architecture has traditionally been employed in the network in which the satellite functions as a bridge in space, connecting two communication points on the ground. The term "bent-pipe" is used to describe the shape of the data path between sending and receiving antennas, with the satellite positioned at the point of the bend. Simply put, the satellite's role in this network arrangement is to relay signals from the end user's terminal to the ISP's gateways, and back again without processing the signal at the satellite. The satellite receives, amplifies, and redirects a carrier on a specific radio frequency through a signal path called a transponder.

Some satellite constellations in LEO such as Starlink and the proposed Telesat constellation will employ laser communication equipment for high-throughput optical inter-satellite links. The interconnected satellites allow for direct routing of user data from satellite to satellite and effectively create a space-based optical mesh network that will enable seamless network management and continuity of service.

The satellite has its own set of antennas to receive communication signals from Earth and to transmit signals to their target location. These antennas and transponders are part of the satellite's "payload", which is designed to receive and transmit signals to and from various places on Earth. What enables this transmission and reception in the payload transponders is a repeater subsystem (RF (radio frequency) equipment) used to change frequencies, filter, separate, amplify and group signals before routing them to their destination address on Earth. The satellite's high-gain receiving antenna passes the transmitted data to the transponder which filters, translates and amplifies them, then redirects them to the transmitting antenna on board. The signal is then routed to a specific ground location through a channel known as a carrier. Beside the payload, the other main component of a communications satellite is called the bus, which comprises all equipment required to move the satellite into position, supply power, regulate equipment temperatures, provide health and tracking information, and perform numerous other operational tasks.

=== Gateways ===
Along with dramatic advances in satellite technology over the past decade, ground equipment has similarly evolved, benefiting from higher levels of integration and increasing processing power, expanding both capacity and performance boundaries. The gateway – or gateway Earth station – is also referred to as a ground station, teleport or hub. The term is sometimes used to describe just the antenna dish portion, or it can refer to the complete system with all associated components. In short, the gateway receives radio wave signals from the satellite on the last leg of the return or upstream payload, carrying the request originating from the end-user's site. The satellite modem at the gateway location demodulates the incoming signal from the outdoor antenna into IP packets and sends the packets to the local network. Access server/gateways manage traffic transported to/from the internet. Once the initial request has been processed by the gateway's servers, sent to and returned from the internet, the requested information is sent back as a forward or downstream payload to the end-user via the satellite, which directs the signal to the subscriber terminal. Each Gateway provides the connection to the internet backbone for the gateway beam(s) it serves.

The system of gateways comprising the satellite ground system provides all network services for satellite and corresponding terrestrial connectivity. Each gateway provides a multiservice access network for subscriber terminal connections to the internet.

As the continental United States is north of the equator, all gateway and subscriber dish antenna must have an unobstructed view of the southern sky. Because of the satellite's geostationary orbit, the gateway antenna can stay pointed at a fixed position.

=== Antenna dish and modem ===
For the customer-provided equipment (i.e. PC and router) to access the broadband satellite network, the customer must have additional physical components installed:

==== Outdoor unit (ODU) ====
At the far end of the outdoor unit is typically a small (2–3-foot, 60 to 90 cm diameter), reflective dish-type radio antenna. The VSAT antenna must also have an unobstructed view of the sky to allow for proper line-of-sight (L-O-S) to the satellite. There are four physical characteristic settings used to ensure that the antenna is configured correctly at the satellite, which are: azimuth, elevation, polarization, and skew. The combination of these settings gives the outdoor unit a L-O-S to the chosen satellite and makes data transmission possible. These parameters are generally set at the time the equipment is installed, along with a beam assignment (K_{a}-band only); these steps must all be taken prior to the actual activation of service. Transmit and receive components are typically mounted at the focal point of the antenna which receives/sends data from/to the satellite. The main parts are:

- Feed – This assembly is part of the VSAT receive and transmit chain, which consists of several components with different functions, including the feed horn at the front of the unit, which resembles a funnel and has the task of focusing the satellite microwave signals across the surface of the dish reflector. The feed horn both receives signals reflected off the dish's surface and transmits outbound signals back to the satellite.
- Block upconverter (BUC) – This unit sits behind the feed horn and may be part of the same unit, but a larger (higher wattage) BUC could be a separate piece attached to the base of the antenna. Its job is to convert the signal from the modem to a higher frequency and amplify it before it is reflected off the dish and towards the satellite.
- Low-noise block downconverter (LNB) – This is the receiving element of the terminal. The LNB's job is to amplify the received satellite radio signal bouncing off the dish and filter out the noise, which is any signal not carrying valid information. The LNB passes the amplified, filtered signal to the satellite modem at the user's location.

==== Indoor unit (IDU) ====
The satellite modem serves as an interface between the outdoor unit and customer-provided equipment (i.e. PC, router) and controls satellite transmission and reception. From the sending device (computer, router, etc.) it receives an input bitstream and converts or modulates it into radio waves, reversing that order for incoming transmissions, which is called demodulation. It provides two types of connectivity:

- Coaxial cable (COAX) connectivity to the satellite antenna. The cable carrying electromagnetic satellite signals between the modem and the antenna generally is limited to be no more than 150 feet in length.
- Ethernet connectivity to the computer, carrying the customer's data packets to and from the internet content servers.

Consumer grade satellite modems typically employ either the DOCSIS or WiMAX telecommunication standard to communicate with the assigned gateway.

== Challenges and limitations ==
=== Signal latency ===
Latency (commonly referred to as "ping time") is the delay between requesting data and the receipt of a response, or in the case of one-way communication, between the actual moment of a signal's broadcast and the time it is received at its destination.

A radio signal takes about 120 milliseconds to reach a geostationary satellite and then 120 milliseconds to reach the ground station, so nearly 1/4 of a second overall. Typically, during perfect conditions, the physics involved in satellite communications account for approximately 550 milliseconds of latency round-trip time.

The longer latency is the primary difference between a standard terrestrial-based network and a geostationary satellite-based network. The round-trip latency of a geostationary satellite communications network can be more than 12 times that of a terrestrial based network.

Satellite latency can be detrimental to especially time-sensitive applications such as on-line gaming (although it only seriously affects the likes of first-person shooters or racing simulators while many MMOGs can operate well over satellite internet), but IPTV is typically a simplex operation (one-way transmission) and latency is not a critical factor for video transmission.

The effects of this delay may be mitigated using data compression, TCP-acceleration, and HTTP pre-fetching.

==== Geostationary orbits ====
A geostationary orbit (or geostationary Earth orbit/GEO) is a geosynchronous orbit directly above the Earth's equator (0° latitude), with a period equal to the Earth's rotational period and an orbital eccentricity of approximately zero (i.e. a "circular orbit"). An object in a geostationary orbit appears motionless, at a fixed position in the sky, to ground observers. Launchers often place communications satellites and weather satellites in geostationary orbits, so that the satellite antennas that communicate with them do not have to move to track them, but can point permanently at the position in the sky where the satellites stay. Due to the constant 0° latitude and circularity of geostationary orbits, satellites in GEO differ in location by longitude only.

Compared to ground-based communication, all geostationary satellite communications experience higher latency due to the signal having to travel 35,786 km (22,236 mi) to a satellite in geostationary orbit and back to Earth again. Even at the speed of light (about 300,000 km/s or 186,000 miles per second), this delay can appear significant. If all other signaling delays could be eliminated, it still takes a radio signal about 250 milliseconds (ms), or about a quarter of a second, to travel to the satellite and back to the ground. The absolute minimum total amount of delay varies, due to the satellite staying in one place in the sky, while ground-based users can be directly below (with a roundtrip latency of 239.6 ms), or far to the side of the planet near the horizon (with a roundtrip latency of 279.0 ms).

For an internet packet, that delay is doubled before a reply is received. That is the theoretical minimum. Factoring in other normal delays from network sources gives a typical one-way connection latency of 500 to 700 ms from the user to the ISP, or about 1,000 to 1,400 ms latency for the total round-trip time (RTT) back to the user. This is more than most dial-up users experience at typically 150–200 ms total latency, and much higher than the typical 15 to 40 ms latency experienced by users of other high-speed internet services, such as cable or VDSL..

For geostationary satellites, there is no way to eliminate latency, but the problem can be somewhat mitigated in internet communications with TCP acceleration features that shorten the apparent round trip time (RTT) per packet by splitting ("spoofing") the feedback loop between the sender and the receiver. Certain acceleration features are often present in recent technology developments embedded in satellite internet equipment.

Latency also impacts the initiation of secure internet connections such as SSL which require the exchange of numerous pieces of data between web server and web client. Although these pieces of data are small, the multiple round trips involved in the handshake produce long delays compared to other forms of internet connectivity, as documented by Stephen T. Cobb in a 2011 report published by the Rural Mobile and Broadband Alliance. This annoyance extends to entering and editing data using some Software as a Service or SaaS applications as well as in other forms of online work.

Functions, like live interactive access to a distant computer – such as virtual private networks, can be affected by the high latency. Many TCP protocols were not designed to work in high-latency environments.

==== Medium and low Earth orbits ====
Medium Earth orbit (MEO) and low Earth orbit (LEO) satellite constellations do not have such long delays, as the satellites are closer to the ground. For example:

- The current LEO constellations of Globalstar and Iridium satellites have delays of less than 40 ms round trip, but their throughput is less than broadband at 64 kbit/s per channel. The Globalstar constellation orbits 1,420 km above the Earth and Iridium orbits at 670 km altitude.
- The O3b constellation orbits at 8,062 km, with RTT latency of approximately 125 ms. The network is also designed for much higher throughput with links well in excess of 1 Gbit/s. The next generation O3b mPOWER constellation shares the same orbit and delivers from 50 Mbit/s to multiple gigabits per second to a single user.
- A study in 2021 showed that the Starlink satellites orbit at 550 km altitude, with an average RTT latency of 45 ms. Another study in 2022 showed that the latency of the Starlink network is 1.8 ms to 22.8 ms more than the latency of terrestrial networks according to a measurement study conducted in the Metro Vancouver area. Note that the exact measurement results can differ as the deployment of Starlink infrastructure varies across time and locations.

Unlike geostationary satellites, LEO and MEO satellites do not stay in a fixed position in the sky and from a lower altitude they can "see" a smaller area of the Earth, and so continuous widespread access requires a constellation of many satellites (low-Earth orbits needing more satellites than medium-Earth orbits) with complex constellation management to switch data transfer between satellites and keep the connection to a customer, and tracking by the ground stations.

MEO satellites require higher power transmissions than LEO to achieve the same signal strength at the ground station but their higher altitude also provides less orbital overcrowding, and their slower orbit speed reduces both Doppler shift and the size and complexity of the constellation required.

Tracking of the moving satellites is usually undertaken in one of three ways, using:

- more diffuse or completely omnidirectional ground antennas capable of communicating with one or more satellites visible in the sky at the same time, but at significantly higher transmit power than fixed geostationary dish antennas (due to the lower gain), and with much poorer signal-to-noise ratios for receiving the signal
- motorized antenna mounts with high-gain, narrow beam antennas tracking individual satellites
- phased array antennas that can steer the beam electronically, together with software that can predict the path of each satellite in the constellation.

In May 2022, Kazakhstani mobile network operator, Kcell, and satellite owner and operator, SES used SES's O3b MEO satellite constellation to demonstrate that MEO satellites could be used to provide high-speed mobile internet to remote regions of Kazakhstan for reliable video calling, conferencing and streaming, and web browsing, with a latency five times lower than on the existing platform based on geostationary orbit satellites.

==== Ultralight atmospheric aircraft as satellites ====
A proposed alternative to relay satellites is a special-purpose high altitude platform stations aircraft, which would fly along a circular path above a fixed ground location, operating under autonomous computer control at a height of approximately 20,000 meters.

For example, the United States Defense Advanced Research Projects Agency Vulture project envisaged an ultralight aircraft capable of station-keeping over a fixed area for a period of up to five years, and able to provide both continuous surveillance to ground assets as well as to service extremely low-latency communications networks. This project was cancelled in 2012 before it became operational.

Onboard batteries would charge during daylight hours through solar panels covering the wings and would provide power to the plane during night. Ground-based satellite internet dishes would relay signals to and from the aircraft, resulting in a greatly reduced round-trip signal latency of only 0.25 milliseconds. The planes could potentially run for long periods without refueling. Several such schemes involving various types of aircraft have been proposed in the past.

=== Interference ===
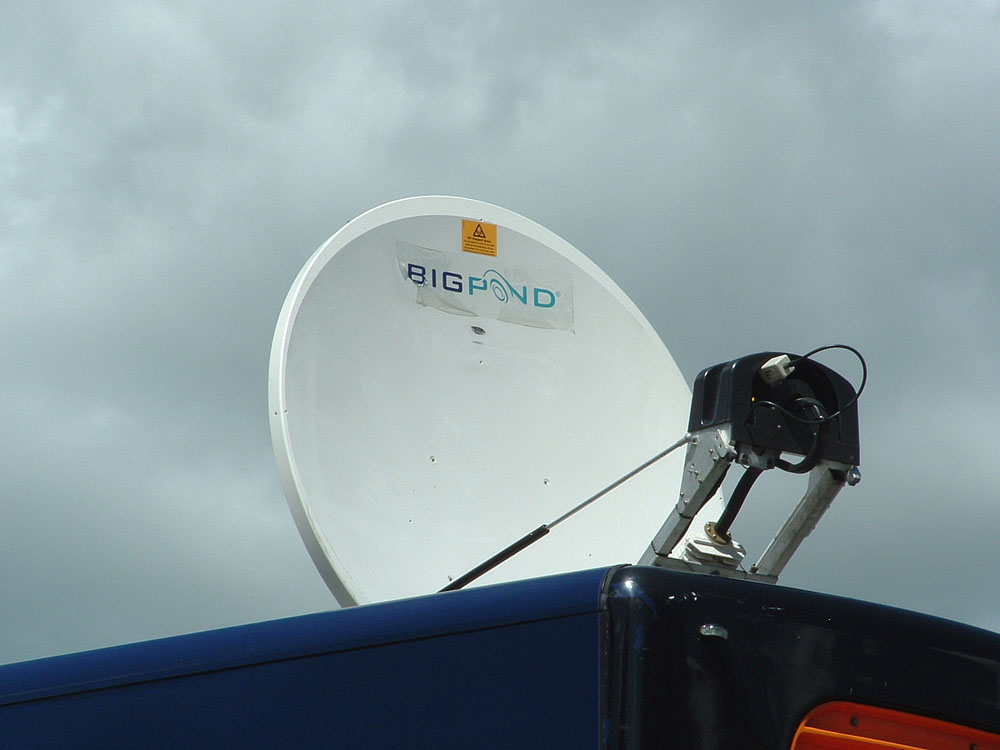
A foldable Bigpond satellite internet dish

Satellite communications are affected by moisture and various forms of precipitation (such as rain or snow) in the signal path between end users or ground stations and the satellite being utilized. This interference with the signal is known as rain fade. The effects are less pronounced on the lower frequency 'L' and 'C' bands but can become quite severe on the higher frequency 'Ku' and 'Ka' band. For satellite internet services in tropical areas with heavy rain, use of the C band (4/6 GHz) with a circular polarisation satellite is popular. Satellite communications on the K_{a} band (19/29 GHz) can use special techniques such as large rain margins, adaptive uplink power control and reduced bit rates during precipitation.

Rain margins are the extra communication link requirements needed to account for signal degradations due to moisture and precipitation, and are of acute importance on all systems operating at frequencies over 10 GHz.

The amount of time during which service is lost can be reduced by increasing the size of the satellite communication dish so as to gather more of the satellite signal on the downlink and also to provide a stronger signal on the uplink. In other words, increasing antenna gain through the use of a larger parabolic reflector is one way of increasing the overall channel gain and, consequently, the signal-to-noise (S/N) ratio, which allows for greater signal loss due to rain fade without the S/N ratio dropping below its minimum threshold for successful communication.

Modern consumer-grade dish antennas tend to be fairly small, which reduces the rain margin or increases the required satellite downlink power and cost. However, it is often more economical to build a more expensive satellite and smaller, less expensive consumer antennas than to increase the consumer antenna size to reduce the satellite cost.

Large commercial dishes of 3.7 m to 13 m diameter can be used to achieve increased rain margins and also to reduce the cost per bit by allowing for more efficient modulation codes. Alternately, larger aperture antennae can require less power from the satellite to achieve acceptable performance. Satellites typically use photovoltaic solar power, so there is no expense for the energy itself, but a more powerful satellite will require larger, more powerful solar panels and electronics, often including a larger transmitting antenna. The larger satellite components not only increase materials costs but also increase the weight of the satellite, and in general, the cost to launch a satellite into an orbit is directly proportional to its weight. (In addition, since satellite launch vehicles [i.e. rockets] have specific payload size limits, making parts of the satellite larger may require either more complex folding mechanisms for parts of the satellite like solar panels and high-gain antennas, or upgrading to a more expensive launch vehicle that can handle a larger payload.)

Modulated carriers can be dynamically altered in response to rain problems or other link impairments using a process called adaptive coding and modulation, or "ACM". ACM allows the bit rates to be increased substantially during normal clear sky conditions, increasing the number of bits per Hz transmitted, and thus reducing overall cost per bit. Adaptive coding requires some sort of a return or feedback channel which can be via any available means, satellite or terrestrial.

=== Line of sight ===
Fresnel zone. D is the distance between the transmitter and the receiver, r is the radius of the Fresnel zone.

Two objects are said to be within line of sight if a straight line between the objects can be connected without any interference, such as a mountain. An object beyond the horizon is below the line of sight and, therefore, can be difficult to communicate with.

Typically a completely clear line of sight between the dish and the satellite is required for the system to work optimally. In addition to the signal being susceptible to absorption and scattering by moisture, the signal is similarly impacted by the presence of trees and other vegetation in the path of the signal. As the radio frequency decreases, to below 900 MHz, penetration through vegetation increases, but most satellite communications operate above 2 GHz making them sensitive to even minor obstructions such as tree foliage. A dish installation in the winter must factor in plant foliage growth that will appear in the spring and summer.

=== Fresnel zone ===
Even if there is a direct line of sight between the transmitting and receiving antenna, reflections from objects near the path of the signal can decrease apparent signal power through phase cancellations. Whether and how much signal is lost from a reflection is determined by the location of the object in the Fresnel zone of the antennas.

== Operation modes ==
=== Two-way satellite-only communication ===
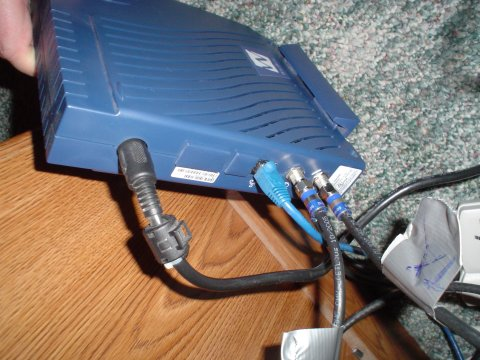
The back panel of a satellite modem, with coaxial connections for both incoming and outgoing signals, and an Ethernet port for connection

Home or consumer grade two-way satellite internet service involves both sending and receiving data from a remote very-small-aperture terminal (VSAT) via satellite to a hub telecommunications port (teleport), which then relays data via the terrestrial internet. The satellite dish at each location must be precisely pointed to avoid interference with other satellites. At each VSAT site the uplink frequency, bit rate and power must be accurately set, under control of the service provider hub.

There are several types of two-way satellite internet services, including time-division multiple access (TDMA) and single channel per carrier (SCPC). Two-way systems can be simple VSAT terminals with a 60–100 cm dish and output power of only a few watts intended for consumers and small business or larger systems that provide more bandwidth. Such systems are frequently marketed as "satellite broadband" and can cost two to three times as much per month as land-based systems such as ADSL. The modems required for this service are often proprietary, but some are compatible with several different providers. They are also expensive, costing in the range of US$600 to $2000.

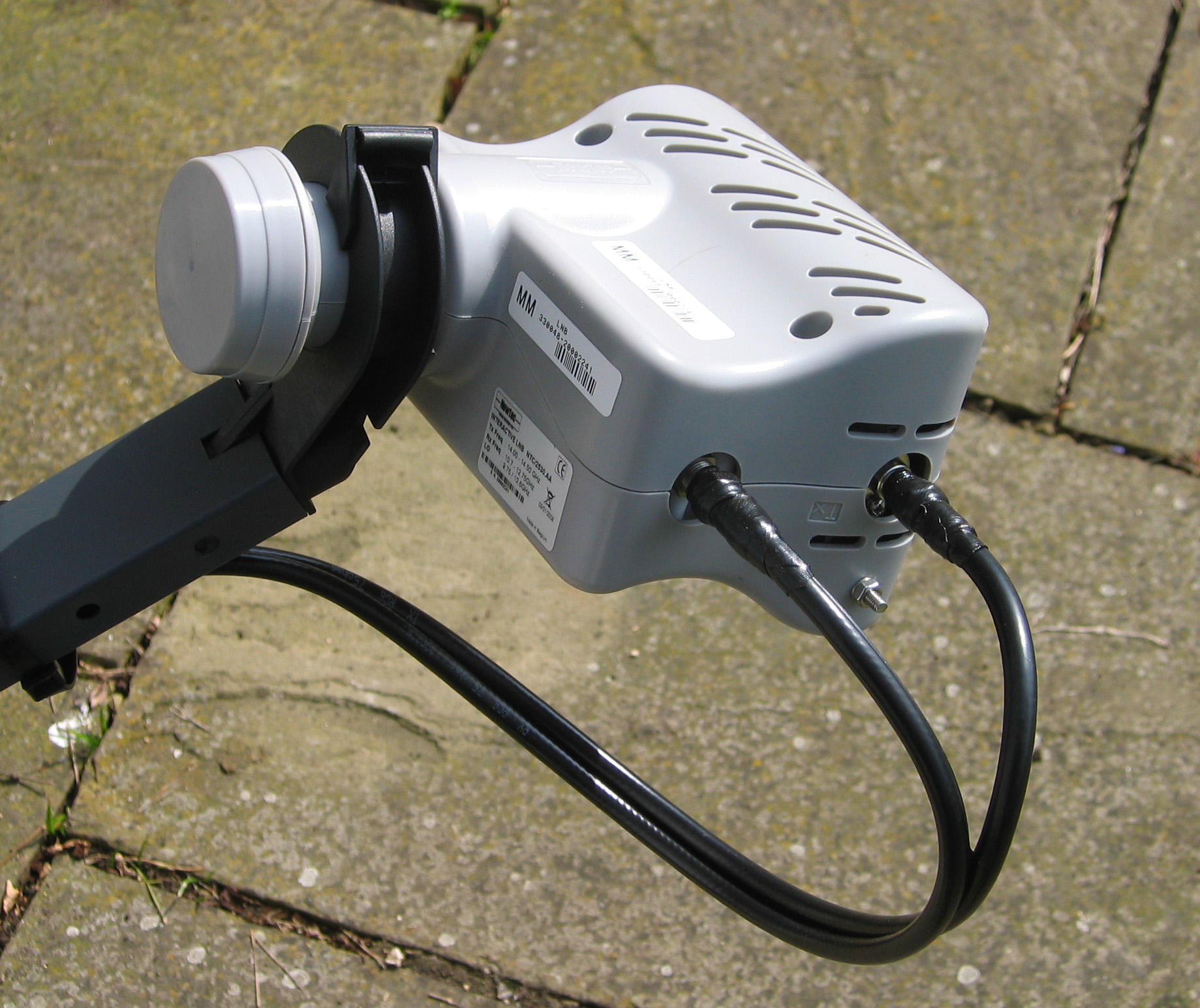
The two-way "iLNB" used on the SES Broadband

The two-way "iLNB" used on the SES Broadband terminal dish has a transmitter and single-polarity receive LNB, both operating in the K_{u} band. Pricing for SES Broadband modems range from €299 to €350. These types of system are generally unsuitable for use on moving vehicles, although some dishes may be fitted to an automatic pan and tilt mechanism to continuously re-align the dish – but these are more expensive. The technology for SES Broadband was delivered by a Belgian company called Newtec.

==== Bandwidth ====
Consumer satellite internet customers range from individual home users with one PC to large remote business sites with several hundred PCs.

Home users tend to use shared satellite capacity to reduce the cost, while still allowing high peak bit rates when congestion is absent. There are usually restrictive time-based bandwidth allowances so that each user gets their fair share, according to their payment. When a user exceeds their allowance, the company may slow down their access, deprioritise their traffic or charge for the excess bandwidth used. For consumer satellite internet, the allowance can typically range from 200 MB per day to 25 GB per month. A shared download carrier may have a bit rate of 1 to 40 Mbit/s and be shared by up to 100 to 4,000 end users.

The uplink direction for shared user customers is normally time-division multiple access (TDMA), which involves transmitting occasional short packet bursts in between other users (similar to how a cellular phone shares a cell tower).

Each remote location may also be equipped with a telephone modem; the connections for this are as with a conventional dial-up ISP. Two-way satellite systems may sometimes use the modem channel in both directions for data where latency is more important than bandwidth, reserving the satellite channel for download data where bandwidth is more important than latency, such as for file transfers.

In 2006, the European Commission sponsored the UNIC Project which aimed to develop an end-to-end scientific test bed for the distribution of new broadband interactive TV-centric services delivered over low-cost two-way satellite to actual end-users in the home. The UNIC architecture employs DVB-S2 standard for downlink and DVB-RCS standard for uplink.

Normal VSAT dishes (1.2 to 2.4 m diameter) are widely used for VoIP phone services. A voice call is sent by means of packets via the satellite and internet. Using coding and compression techniques the bit rate needed per call is only 10.8 kbit/s each way.

==== Portable satellite internet ====
===== Portable satellite modem =====
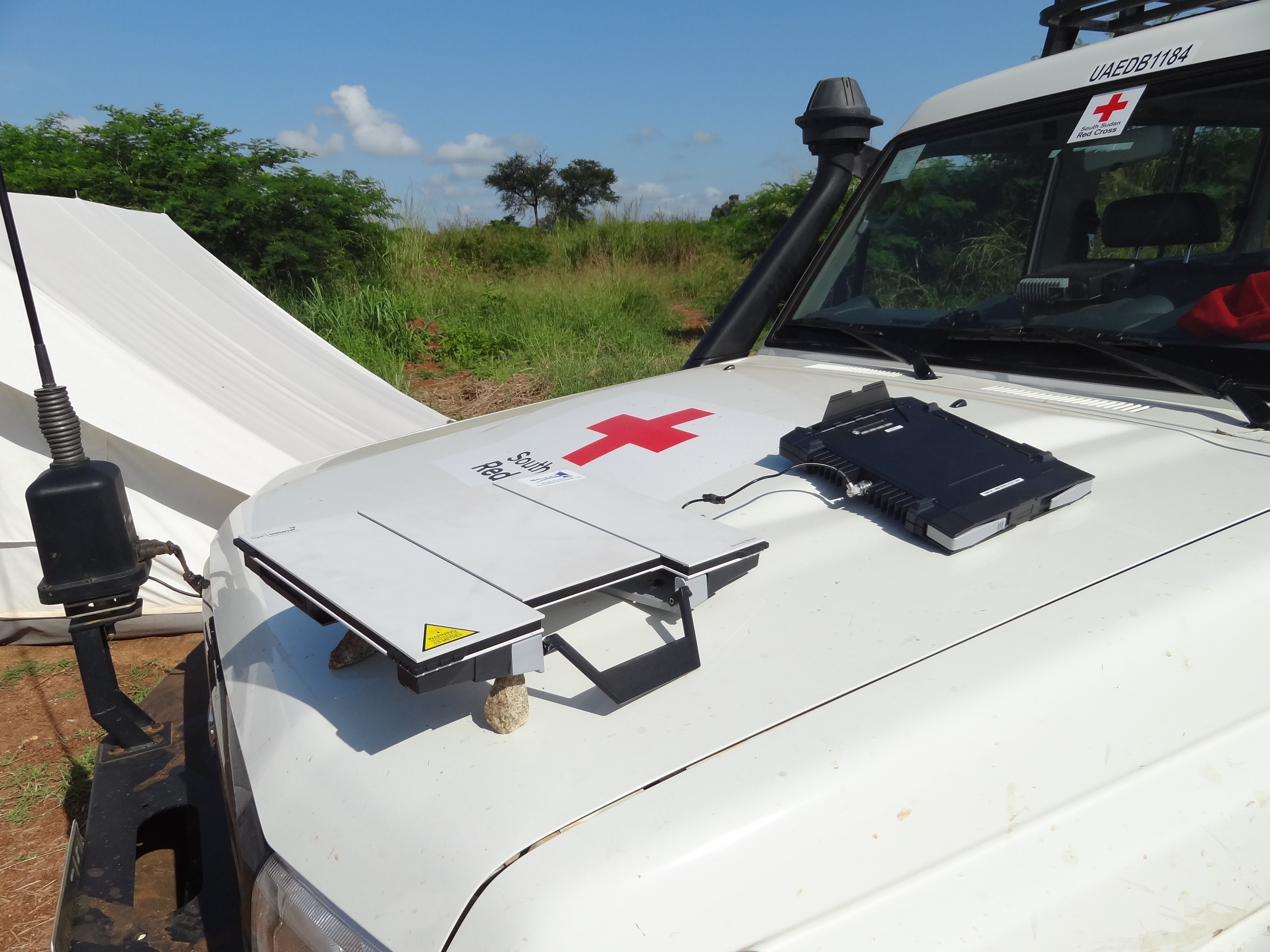
Portable satellite internet modem and antenna deployed with the Red Cross in South Sudan in 2014

These usually come in the shape of a self-contained flat rectangular box that needs to be pointed in the general direction of the satellite – unlike VSAT the alignment need not be very precise and the modems have built in signal strength meters to help the user align the device properly. The modems have commonly used connectors such as Ethernet or Universal Serial Bus (USB). Some also have an integrated Bluetooth transceiver and double as a satellite phone. The modems also tend to have their own batteries so they can be connected to a laptop without draining its battery. The most common such system is INMARSAT's BGAN – these terminals are about the size of a briefcase and have near-symmetric connection speeds of around 350 to 500 kbit/s. Smaller modems exist like those offered by Thuraya but only connect at 444 kbit/s in a limited coverage area.

At $5 to $7 per megabyte on average, portable satellite internet is typically more expensive than other modes of internet access, with modems usually costing between $1,000 and $5,000. Due to this, it is most often used on vehicles without access to other modes of internet access, such as seafaring vessels.

===== Internet via satellite phone =====
For many years satellite phones have been able to connect to the internet. Bandwidth varies from about 2400 bit/s for Iridium network satellites and ACeS based phones to 15 kbit/s upstream and 60 kbit/s downstream for Thuraya handsets. Globalstar also provides internet access at 9.6 kbit/s; like Iridium and ACeS a dial-up connection is required and is billed per minute, however both Globalstar and Iridium are planning to launch new satellites offering always-on data services at higher rates. With Thuraya phones the 9.6 kbit/s dial-up connection is also possible, the 60 kbit/s service is always-on and the user is billed for data transferred (about $5 per megabyte). The phones can be connected to a laptop or other computer using a USB or RS-232 interface. Due to the low bandwidths involved it is extremely slow to browse the web with such a connection, but useful for sending email, Secure Shell data and using other low-bandwidth protocols. Since satellite phones tend to have omnidirectional antennas no alignment is required as long as there is a line of sight between the phone and the satellite.

=== One-way receive ===
One-way terrestrial return satellite internet systems are used with conventional dial-up internet access, with outbound (upstream) data traveling through a telephone modem, but downstream data sent via satellite at a higher rate. In the U.S., an FCC license is required for the uplink station only; no license is required for the users.

Another type of one-way satellite internet system uses General Packet Radio Service (GPRS) for the back-channel. Using standard GPRS or Enhanced Data Rates for GSM Evolution (EDGE), costs are reduced for higher effective rates if the upload volume is very low, and also because this service is not per-time charged, but charged by volume uploaded. GPRS as return improves mobility when the service is provided by a satellite that transmits in the field of 100 to 200 kW. Using a 33 cm wide satellite dish, a notebook and a normal GPRS equipped GSM phone, users can get mobile satellite broadband.

==== System components ====
The transmitting station has two components, consisting of a high-speed internet connection to serve many customers at once, and the satellite uplink to broadcast requested data to the customers. The ISP's routers connect to proxy servers which can enforce quality of service (QoS) bandwidth limits and guarantees for each customer's traffic.

Often, nonstandard IP stacks are used to address the latency and asymmetry problems of the satellite connection. As with one-way receive systems, data sent over the satellite link is generally also encrypted, as otherwise it would be accessible to anyone with a satellite receiver.

Many IP-over-satellite implementations use paired proxy servers at both endpoints so that certain communications between clients and servers need not to accept the latency inherent in a satellite connection. For similar reasons, there exist special Virtual private network (VPN) implementations designed for use over satellite links because standard VPN software cannot handle the long packet travel times.

Upload speeds are limited by the user's dial-up modem, while download speeds can be very fast compared to dial-up, using the modem only as the control channel for packet acknowledgement.

Latency is still high, although lower than full two-way geostationary satellite internet, since only half of the data path is via satellite, the other half being via the terrestrial channel.

=== One-way broadcast ===
One-way broadcast satellite internet systems are used for Internet Protocol (IP) broadcast-based data, audio and video distribution. In the United States, a Federal Communications Commission (FCC) license is required only for the uplink station, not for its users. Note that most internet protocols will not work correctly over one-way access, since they require a return channel. However, internet content such as web pages can still be distributed over a one-way system by "pushing" them out to local storage at end user sites, though full interactivity is not possible. This is much like TV or radio content which offers little user interface.

The broadcast mechanism may include compression and error correction to help ensure the one-way broadcast is properly received. The data may also be rebroadcast periodically, so that receivers that did not previously succeed will have additional chances to try downloading again.

The data may also be encrypted so that while anyone can receive the data, only certain destinations are able to actually decode and use the broadcast data. Authorized users only need to have possession of either a short decryption key or an automatic rolling code device that uses its own highly accurate independent timing mechanism to decrypt the data.

==== System hardware components ====
Similar to one-way terrestrial return, satellite internet access may include interfaces to the public switched telephone network for squawk box applications. An internet connection is not required, but many applications include a File Transfer Protocol (FTP) server to queue data for broadcast.

==== System software components ====
Most one-way broadcast applications require custom programming at the remote sites. The software at the remote site must filter, store, present a selection interface to and display the data. The software at the transmitting station must provide access control, priority queuing, sending, and encapsulating of the data.

==== Services ====
Emerging commercial services in this area include:

- Outernet – Satellite constellation technology

== Efficiency increases ==
=== 2013 FCC report cites big jump in satellite performance ===
In its report released in February, 2013, the Federal Communications Commission noted significant advances in satellite internet performance. The FCC's Measuring Broadband America report also ranked the major ISPs by how close they came to delivering on advertised speeds. In this category, satellite internet topped the list, with 90% of subscribers seeing speeds at 140% or better than what was advertised.

=== Reducing satellite latency ===
Much of the slowdown associated with satellite internet is that for each request, many roundtrips must be completed before any useful data can be received by the requester. (Note: TCP is bound by the low latency of a three-way handshake. See Transmission Control Protocol.) Special IP stacks and proxies can also reduce latency through lessening the number of roundtrips, or simplifying and reducing the length of protocol headers. Optimization technologies include TCP acceleration, HTTP pre-fetching and DNS caching among many others. See the Space Communications Protocol Specifications standard (SCPS), developed by NASA and adopted widely by commercial and military equipment and software providers in the market space.

== Satellites launched ==
=== Geostationary orbit ===
The WINDS satellite was launched on February 23, 2008. The WINDS satellite is used to provide broadband internet services to Japan and locations across the Asia-Pacific region. The satellite to provides a maximum speed of 155 Mbit/s down and 6 Mbit/s up to residences with a 45 cm aperture antenna and a 1.2 Gbit/s connection to businesses with a 5-meter antenna. It has reached the end of its design life expectancy.

SkyTerra-1 was launched in mid-November 2010, providing North America, while Hylas-1 was launched in November 2010, targeting Europe.

On December 26, 2010, Eutelsat's KA-SAT was launched. It covers the European continent with 80 spot beams – focused signals that cover an area a few hundred kilometers across Europe and the Mediterranean. Spot beams allow for frequencies to be effectively reused in multiple regions without interference. The result is increased capacity. Each of the spot beams has an overall capacity of 900 Mbit/s and the entire satellite will has a capacity of 70 Gbit/s.

ViaSat-1 was launched Oct. 19, 2011 from Baikonur, Kazakhstan, offering 140 Gbit/s of total throughput capacity, through the Exede Internet service. Passengers aboard JetBlue Airways can use this service since 2015. The service has also been expanded to United Airlines, American Airlines, Scandinavian Airlines, Virgin America and Qantas.

The EchoStar XVII satellite was launched July 5, 2012 by Arianespace and was placed in its permanent geosynchronous orbital slot of 107.1° West longitude, servicing HughesNet. This K_{a}-band satellite has over 100 Gbit/s of throughput capacity.

In 2015 and 2016, the Australian Government launched two Sky Muster geostationary satellites to provide internet to regional Australians and residents of External Territories, such as Norfolk Island and Christmas Island.

In 2006 and 2015, the Argentinian company ARSAT launched the ARSAT-1 and ARSAT-2 satellites, respectively. Providing internet and TV access to remote locations in its country of origin.

=== Medium Earth orbit ===
Since 2013, the O3b satellite constellation (in Medium Earth Orbit at an altitude of 8,063 km) claims an end-to-end round-trip latency of 140 ms for data services. Since 2024, the next generation O3b mPOWER constellation has been operating alongside in MEO, offering tens of Mbps to multiple Gbps per service with a latency of about 150 ms

=== Low Earth orbit ===
As of September 2024, 6,426 Starlink satellites are orbiting Earth. As of September 2024, Starlink has over 4 million subscribers. There are 648 Oneweb has satellites in low Earth orbit.

== See also ==
- Back-channel and return channel
- DishNET (satellite internet access in the United States)
- HughesNet (formerly DIRECWAY)
- IP over DVB
- Lamit Company – Company operating communication satellites
- NetHope#NetReliefKit
- Satellite data collection
- SES Broadband (satellite internet access in Europe)
- StarBand – Satellite broadband Internet service
- Teledesic – Satellite company
- Tooway – Satellite broadband Internet provider
- TS 2 – Internet provider for U.S. Army soldiers in Afghanistan
- Very small aperture terminal – Satellite communication system with small dish antenna
- Viasat Inc. (Excede Internet)
- Wireless Internet Service Provider
