= Lamit Company =

Company operating communication satellites

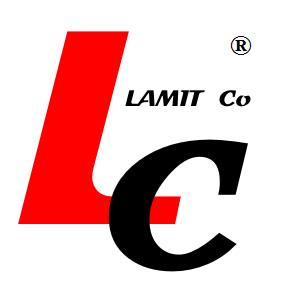
- Type: Private
- Industry: Telecommunication
- Founded: Bucharest, Romania (2002) Brussels, Belgium
- Headquarters: Bucharest, Romania
- Area served: Worldwide
- Key people: Liviu Mandreanu, CEO; Adrian Aelenei, CTO
- Products: VSAT, Satellite internet
- Services: Satellite communication
- Website: www.lamit.ro

Lamit Company is an independent satellite operator company in Europe, operating worldwide. The company provides satellite internet and telephony to primary schools and high schools, universities, government institutions etc. Areas of the world covered by the company are: Africa (whole), Europe (whole), Middle East (whole), Russia (major parts), Australia (northern part), Americas, India, Indonesia, etc.

== Satellite Internet for wind farms, photovoltaic, hydroelectric plants ==
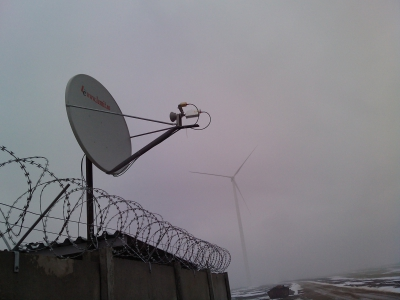
Satellite internet for wind farm and photovoltaic plant

== Maritime Satellite services and coverage ==
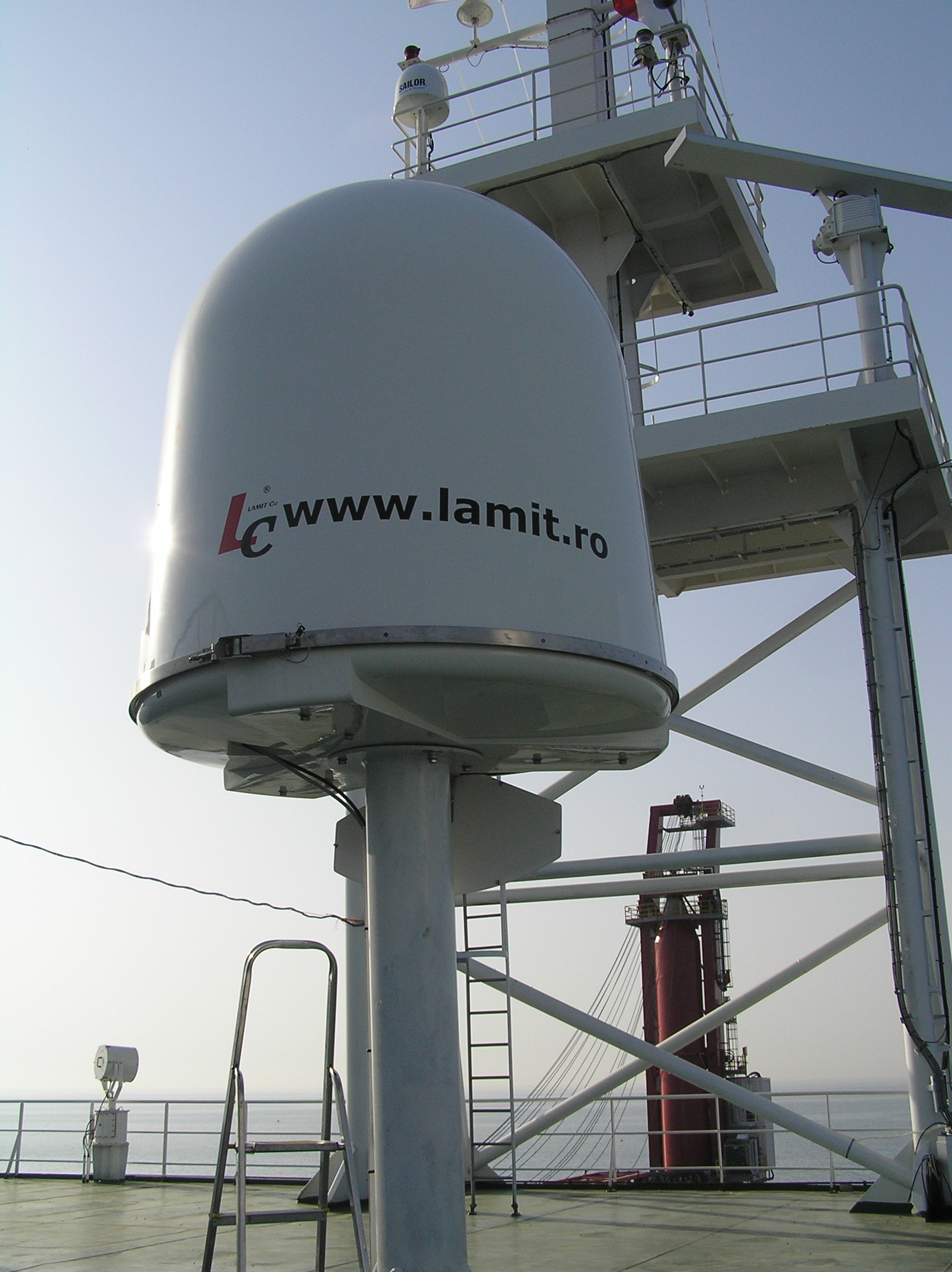
marine VSAT system

The company manages and operates different capacities on multiple satellites and provides fully mobile maritime connection solutions.

Lamit Company also provides services for yachts which are also applicable to small vessels, ferry boats or fishing vessels.

The marine VSAT uses a very complex, 3 axis, automatic, rotation system

The fleet can be constantly connected to the desired terrestrial network or to other vessels, allowing the development and centralization of on board applications. The VSAT maritime solution allows the crew and passengers to use Internet, exchange e-mails, phone with VoIP system, Fax, use mobile or standard phones and other evolved applications as well as be connected no matter what the distance or the weather conditions are.

== Highly Mobile Satellite Internet System ==
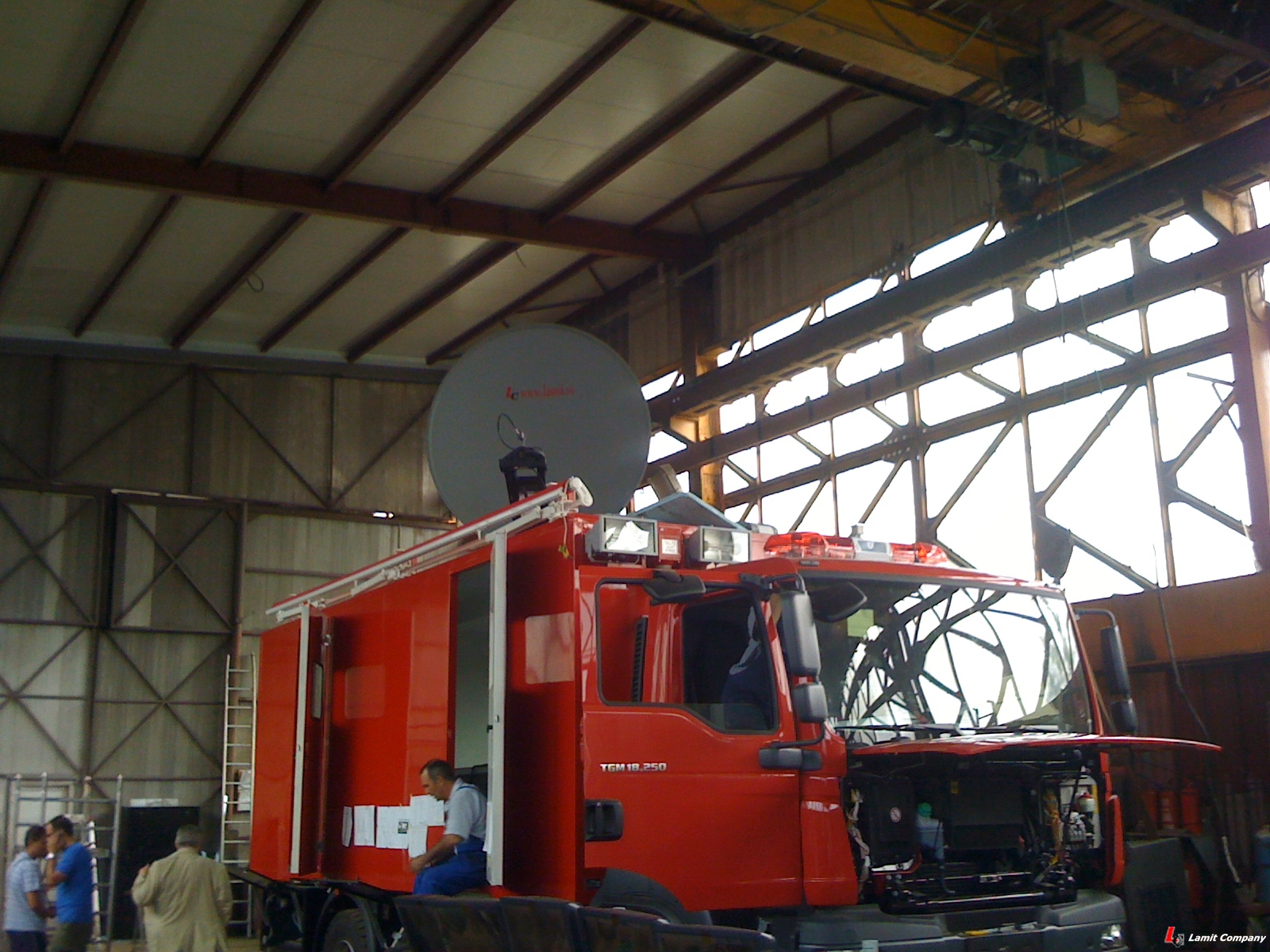
Mobile VSAT system installed on a vehicle

- The mobile equipment contains: external devices (satellite antenna and mounts) powered by three independent motors, fix support (mount) internal equipment (satellite VSAT terminal and accessories) completely automatic, for the connection with the satellite.

- Antennas used: 0.75 m, 0.98 m, 1.2 m, 1.8 m and for special connections, 2.4 m or even more.

- The connection with the satellite is made automatically, in 3–5 minutes from the command issuing.

== Fixed Satellite Internet System ==
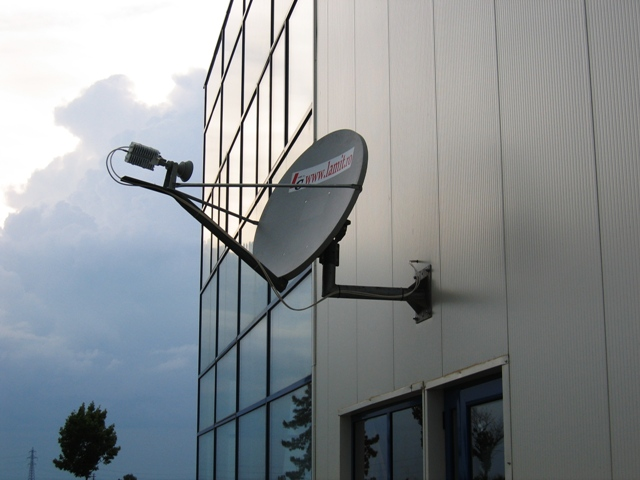
fixed VSAT system

The professional broadband two way fixed satellite internet service features maximum transfer rates and minimal costs, in all covered areas. The connection QoS can be customized, depending on each client's necessity (different content ratio). Once implemented, the two way satellite internet equipment is able to transmit the information (together with the relevant collateral devices) by Wi-fi (wireless transmissions) existent telephone lines or even CPL (through the electrical network).

== Satellite internet access for Iraq, Afghanistan and Kuwait areas ==
The military personnel deployed in the region, the government agencies, the contractors, the universities, the Internet Caffes, and the local Iraqi/Afghan businesses companies are among the many subscribers who use this service in order to be in permanent contact with the rest of the world.

A VSAT communications network provides permanent broadband communication. The bidirectional satellite access provides speeds comparable to DSL.

The bidirectional internet service via satellite allows the troops, marines and civilian staff from the Military Bases, temporarily located in Middle East, to communicate without restrictions. They exchange e-mails, instant messages, they can surf the web and they are also able to communicate using the popular VoIP (Voice over IP) and share photos/videos in real time.

== Lamit 2 Pro servers - Acceleration, Network Management and VoIP Optimization for Satellite Internet Connections ==
The new generation of the professional Lamit 2 Pro Servers are created for the improvement and better administration of the satellite and terrestrial connections, and have new allocated bandwidth optimization functions and, in the same time, a management and a total control of the internal network. The servers are created on many endowment levels regardless the networks type and dimension. Also, there has been put a big accent on the VoIP calls prioritization function, being taken into consideration the loss that might appear because of the internet satellite connection, together with a possible wireless connection and finally because of the VoIP (Voice Over Internet Protocol) connection latency.

== See also ==
- Satellite Internet
- VSAT – Satellite communication system with small dish antenna
- Satmodem
- Broadband Internet access
- Satellite
- List of device bandwidths
- Voip – Methods of delivering voice communications and multimedia over IP networks
- Digital television
- Single channel per carrier – Dedicated use of satellite bandwidth
- Low-noise blockconverter
- Ku band
- Internet
- Internet access
