= O3b =

Group of telecommunications satellites

O3b MEO
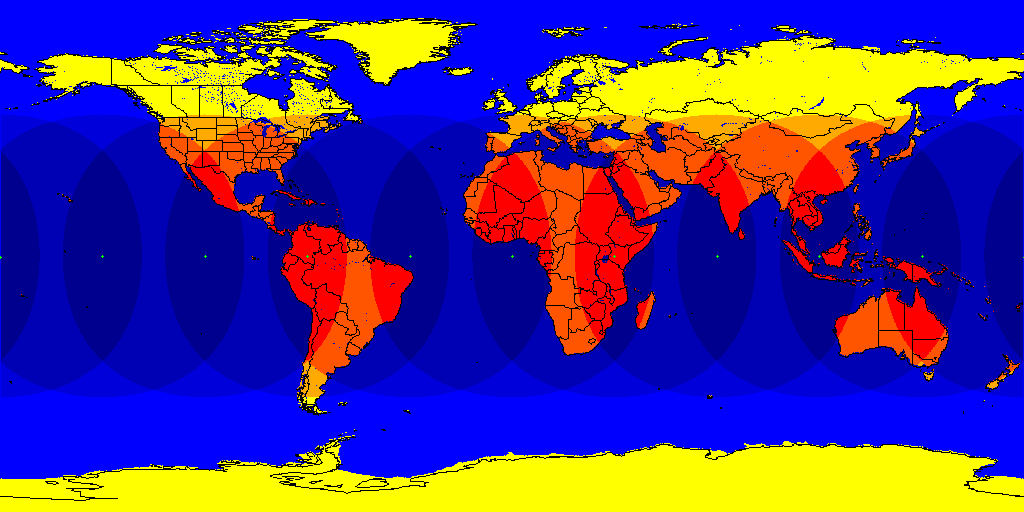
- Rendering of O3b MEO satellite coverage areas and visibility around the equator
- Mission type: Internet access
- Operator: SES Networks

Spacecraft properties
- Manufacturer: Thales Alenia Space
- Launch mass: 700 kg

Start of mission
- Launch date: 25 June 2013 (four); 10 July 2014 (four); 18 December 2014 (four); 9 March 2018 (four); 4 April 2019 (four)

Orbital parameters
- Reference system: Geocentric orbit
- Regime: Medium Earth orbit
- Perigee altitude: 8063 km
- Period: 287.9 minutes

O3b is a satellite constellation in Medium Earth orbit (MEO) owned and operated by SES, and designed to provide lower-latency broadband connectivity to remote locations for mobile network operators and internet service providers, maritime, aviation, and government and defence. It is often referred to as O3b MEO to distinguish these satellites from SES's O3b mPOWER constellation.

O3b originally stood for "other three billion", or the other three billion people at the time that did not have stable internet access, and the constellation was initially built, owned and operated by O3b Networks, which became a wholly owned subsidiary of SES in 2016 and ownership and operation of the constellation passed to SES Networks, a division of SES. The O3b MEO constellation began offering service in March 2014.

== History ==
Initially planned to launch in 2010, the first four O3b satellites reached orbit on a Soyuz-2 / Fregat-MT launch vehicle by Arianespace on 25 June 2013. After discovering a hardware defect in the initial satellites, O3b postponed the planned September 2013 launch of four additional satellites so repairs could be made. The second four satellites were launched by the same type of rocket from the Space Center in French Guiana, on 10 July 2014 and the O3b system started full commercial service on 1 September 2014.

The third launch of four took place in December 2014, bringing the satellite constellation to 12 satellites. Four years later, four additional satellites were launched on 9 March 2018 on a Soyuz-2.1b rocket from the Centre Spatial Guyanais. In December 2018, Thales Alenia Space said that tests on the final four O3b satellites would be completed by the end of January 2019 and the four satellites were successfully launched on 4 April 2019.

In 2010, operators in the Cook Islands, Pakistan and Nigeria were among the first to prebook capacity on the O3b constellation to serve their respective markets.

In 2010, O3b announced the selection of Europe Media Port to be the first provider of Gateway Teleport services for O3b's global network and a contract with Viasat for the production and installation of Ka-band infrastructure.

In July 2014, SES Government Solutions (now SES Space & Defense), a subsidiary of (then O3b investor, now owner) SES, received approval to offer O3b services on their General Services Administration (GSA) schedule allowing SES GS to be the first distribution partner to offer O3b capability directly to the U.S. Government.

In November 2014, MS Quantum of the Seas became the first cruise ship to provide fast internet to guests through O3b Networks. The service is branded "Voom" by its cruise line, Royal Caribbean International and it was subsequently rolled out to every ship in their fleet.

In August 2015, SES subsidiary, SES Government Solutions (now SES Space & Defense) agreed on a one-year contract with US government scientific agency, National Oceanic and Atmospheric Administration (NOAA) to supply O3b services and ground equipment to the National Weather Service Office in American Samoa, expanding NOAA's broadband connectivity outside the continental United States to provide weather, water, and climate data, and forecasts and warnings to American Samoa.

In August 2016, SES Government Solutions (now SES Space & Defense) announced a contract to provide O3b's high throughput, low latency satellite communications for a US Department of Defense end-user. The agreement is for a 365 days-per-year service consisting of a full-duplex symmetric 155 Mbit/s link, gateway access, a transportable 2.4 metre terminal, terrestrial backhaul, and maintenance and installation services, with a latency of under 200 milliseconds per round trip. The contract also provides for additional capacity to meet surge requirements.

In September 2017, SES announced O3b mPOWER, the next generation of MEO satellites to expand the capacity of the existing O3b constellation of (then) 12 satellites. Initially seven O3b mPOWER satellites were ordered from Boeing for launch in 2021 to provide flexible and scalable, low-latency satellite-based networks with terabits of throughput.

In June 2018, the US Department of Defense signed a single-award blanket purchase agreement with SES Government Solutions (now SES Space & Defense) for MEO high throughput, low latency satellite services including managed broadband services, gateway services, and monitoring and control services, to a maximum of US$516.7 million over a five-year period.

In September 2019, SES became a Microsoft Azure ExpressRoute services partner to provide dedicated, private network connectivity from sea vessels, aircraft, and industrial or government sites anywhere in the world to the Azure cloud computing service, via both its geostationary satellites and O3b MEO satellites.

In August 2020 SES contracted Boeing to build four O3b mPOWER satellites in addition to the seven ordered in 2017. SpaceX was contracted for additional launches, to make four launches for the whole O3b mPOWER constellation, expected in 2021–2024.

In September 2020, SES and Microsoft announced that SES was the medium Earth orbit connectivity partner for the Microsoft Azure Orbital ground station service that enables network operators to control their satellite operations and capacity from within the Azure cloud computing service. Under their agreement, SES and Microsoft will jointly invest in Azure Orbital ground stations for the MEO and Earth Observation segments, initially in the United States, which will be installed and managed by SES. Also, satellite telemetry, tracking and control systems and data ground stations for the O3b mPOWER satellites will be located with Microsoft's Azure edge sites to provide O3b mPOWER customers with "one-hop" access to Azure cloud services.

In October 2020, international charity hospital ships provider, Mercy Ships announced it will be using SES's Signature Maritime connectivity services via O3b satellites to provide remote viewing and diagnosis, and remote training on board the Global Mercy, the world's largest civilian hospital ship.

In February 2021, SES announced two contracts with the US Department of Defense as part of the June 2018 blanket purchase agreement. One is for a portable O3b service to support forward-deployed military personnel and the second to provide O3b mission-critical communications without using a commercial gateway in remote locations in Southwest Asia, managed and controlled from an SES Network Operations Center.

Also in February 2021, SES announced that its Signature Cruise broadband connectivity via O3b will be used on Virgin Voyages' latest ships Scarlet Lady and Valiant Lady to provide passengers with free fast onboard wi-fi internet access.

In June 2021, SES joined the Amazon Web Services Direct Connect Delivery Partner programme, using the O3b constellation (and SES' fleet of geostationary satellites) to provide customers access to AWS cloud-based applications and services from locations around the world with limited or no terrestrial communications, and to provide the cloud provider a backup network if their infrastructure fails.

In August 2021, Microsoft became the first cloud provider customer for O3b, with Microsoft buying managed satellite connectivity services from SES for the Microsoft Azure cloud computing service. Microsoft is initially using the existing first generation O3b satellites, later upgrading to the faster broadband speeds from second generation O3b mPOWER satellites.

In December 2021, SES's wholly owned subsidiary SES Government Solutions (now SES Space & Defense) announced that the US Army has conducted trials of commercial satellite constellations in multiple orbits, including the O3b satellite system, as part of the effort to establish Multi-Domain Operations.

In December 2021, Honeywell, Hughes Network Systems and SES demonstrated multi-orbit high-speed airborne connectivity for military customers using Honeywell's JetWave MCX terminal and a Hughes HM-series modem, and SES satellites in both medium Earth orbit (MEO) and geostationary orbit (GEO). The tests achieved full duplex data rates of more than 40 megabits per second via a number of SES' (GEO) satellites including GovSat-1, and the O3b satellite constellation, with connections moving between GEO/MEO links in under 30 sec.

In May 2022, in conjunction with Kazakhstani mobile network operator, Kcell, SES used the O3b satellite constellation to demonstrate that MEO satellites could be used to provide high-speed 3G and 4G connectivity to remote regions of Kazakhstan for reliable video calling, conferencing and streaming, and web browsing, with a latency five times lower than on the existing platform based on geostationary orbit satellites.

On 16 December 2022, the first two (of 13) of SES's next generation O3b mPOWER (MEO) satellite constellation were successfully launched. O3b mPOWER 3 and 4 were launched on 28 April 2023 and O3b mPOWER 5 and 6 on 12 November 2023, and with six satellites in MEO, the service began commercial operation alongside the existing first generation O3b satellites in April 2024. O3b mPOWER 7 and 8 were launched in December 2024 and began service in June 2025.

== Satellites ==
The satellites are deployed in a circular orbit along the equator at an altitude of 8,063 km (5,010 mi) (medium Earth orbit) at a velocity of approximately 11,755 mph (18,918 km/h), each making 5 orbits a day. Due to problems with a component of the first four satellites launched, three of those four have been placed on standby.

Each satellite is equipped with twelve fully steerable Ka-band antennas (two beams for gateways, ten beams for remotes) that use 4.3 GHz of spectrum (2 × 216 MHz per beam) with a proposed throughput of 1.6 Gbit/s per beam (800 Mbit/s per direction), resulting in a total capacity of 16 Gbit/s per satellite. Each beam's footprint measures 700 km (430 mi) in diameter. O3b claims a mouth-to-ear one-way latency of 179 milliseconds for voice communication, and an end-to-end round-trip latency of 140 ms for data services. The maximum throughput per TCP connection is 2.1 Mbit/s. For maritime applications, O3b claims a round-trip latency of 140 ms, and connectivity speeds of over 500 Mbit/s.

The satellites are powered by gallium arsenide solar arrays and lithium-ion batteries and weigh approximately 700 kg (1,500 lb) each.

The satellites were constructed by Thales Alenia Space, a division of Thales Group. The first satellite (PFM) was built in the Cannes Mandelieu Space Center, while the rest of the constellation was assembled, integrated and tested in Thales Alenia Space Italy's Roman facilities.

In September 2017, SES announced O3b mPOWER, the next generation of O3b satellites and placed an order for an initial seven from Boeing Satellite Systems using a new satellite platform based on Boeing's 702 line of scalable buses. The O3b mPOWER constellation of medium Earth orbit (MEO) satellites for broadband internet services would "be able to deliver anywhere from hundreds of megabits to 10 gigabits to any ship at sea" through 30,000 spot beams, with software-defined routing to direct traffic between the MEO satellites and SES' geostationary fleet. The number of O3b mPOWER satellites ordered was increased to 11 and then 13, and on 16 December 2022, the first two O3b mPOWER satellites were successfully launched, with four more in 2023, and the service began operations alongside the existing O3b constellation in April 2024. The seventh and eighth (upgraded) satellites were launched in December 2024 to increase the constellation's capacity.

== List of satellites ==
O3b satellites
Name	NORAD ID	Int'l code	Launch date	Launch vehicle	Period (min)
O3B PFM	39191	2013-031D	25 June 2013	Soyuz ST-B (VS05)	287.9
O3B FM2	39190	2013-031C	25 June 2013	Soyuz ST-B (VS05)	287.9
O3B FM3	40082	2014-038D	10 July 2014	Soyuz ST-B (VS08)	287.9
O3B FM4	39189	2013-031B	25 June 2013	Soyuz ST-B (VS05)	287.9
O3B FM5	39188	2013-031A	25 June 2013	Soyuz ST-B (VS05)	287.9
O3B FM6	40080	2014-038B	10 July 2014	Soyuz ST-B (VS08)	287.9
O3B FM7	40081	2014-038C	10 July 2014	Soyuz ST-B (VS08)	287.9
O3B FM8	40079	2014-038A	10 July 2014	Soyuz ST-B (VS08)	287.9
O3B FM9	40351	2014-083D	18 December 2014	Soyuz ST-B (VS10)	287.9
O3B FM10	40348	2014-083A	18 December 2014	Soyuz ST-B (VS10)	287.9
O3B FM11	40349	2014-083B	18 December 2014	Soyuz ST-B (VS10)	287.9
O3B FM12	40350	2014-083C	18 December 2014	Soyuz ST-B (VS10)	287.9
O3B FM13	43234	2018-024D	9 March 2018	Soyuz ST-B (VS18)	287.9
O3B FM14	43233	2018-024C	9 March 2018	Soyuz ST-B (VS18)	287.9
O3B FM15	43231	2018-024A	9 March 2018	Soyuz ST-B (VS18)	287.9
O3B FM16	43232	2018-024B	9 March 2018	Soyuz ST-B (VS18)	287.9
O3B FM17	44114	2019-020C	4 April 2019	Soyuz ST-B (VS22)	287.9
O3B FM18	44115	2019-020D	4 April 2019	Soyuz ST-B (VS22)	287.9
O3B FM19	44113	2019-020B	4 April 2019	Soyuz ST-B (VS22)	287.9
O3B FM20	44112	2019-020A	4 April 2019	Soyuz ST-B (VS22)	287.9

== Use of medium Earth orbit ==
O3b MEO is currently the only high-throughput satellite (HTS) system for internet services to use the medium Earth orbit; most other existing and proposed systems use satellites in either geosynchronous orbit (GEO) or low Earth orbit (LEO). Although previous satellite internet services primarily used geosynchronous satellites (SES has four geostationary HTS in orbit – Astra 2E, SES-12, SES-14 and SES-15), demand for increased bandwidth and for lower latency has shifted the focus for HTS to lower orbits. The lower the altitude of the orbit, the closer the satellite is to the Earth and the lower the latency and path losses (enabling lower ground station and satellite power, and costs for the same throughput) The propagation delay for a round-trip internet protocol transmission via a geosynchronous satellite can be over 550 ms, and such latency is the bane of digital connectivity, in particular for automated stock trades, hardcore gaming and Skype video chats. So, many proposed non-geosynchronous satellite internet services have adopted a low Earth orbit of under 2000 km altitude where latency can be as little 40ms, and by 2018 more than 18,000 new LEO satellites had been proposed to launch by 2025.

However, a lower orbit also has drawbacks; satellites move faster relative to the ground and can "see" a smaller area of the Earth, and so for continuous widespread access require a constellation of many satellites, with complex constellation management and tracking by the ground stations. Medium Earth orbit, although higher in altitude than LEO is nevertheless much lower than geosynchronous orbit and so shares many of the advantages of LEO while reducing its drawbacks:

- Latency as low as 125ms – longer than LEO but substantial improvement over GEO satellites
- Longer orbital period than LEO – a smaller constellation needed for continuous "visibility"
- Cheaper and simpler telemetry, tracking and control systems than LEO
- Higher "look angle" from the ground than LEOs
- Longer service life expectancy than LEO satellites
- Reduced Doppler shift problem than LEO
- Less orbital overcrowding and space debris than LEO

== See also ==
- SES
- O3b Networks
- O3b mPOWER
