= O3b mPOWER =

Communications satellite system

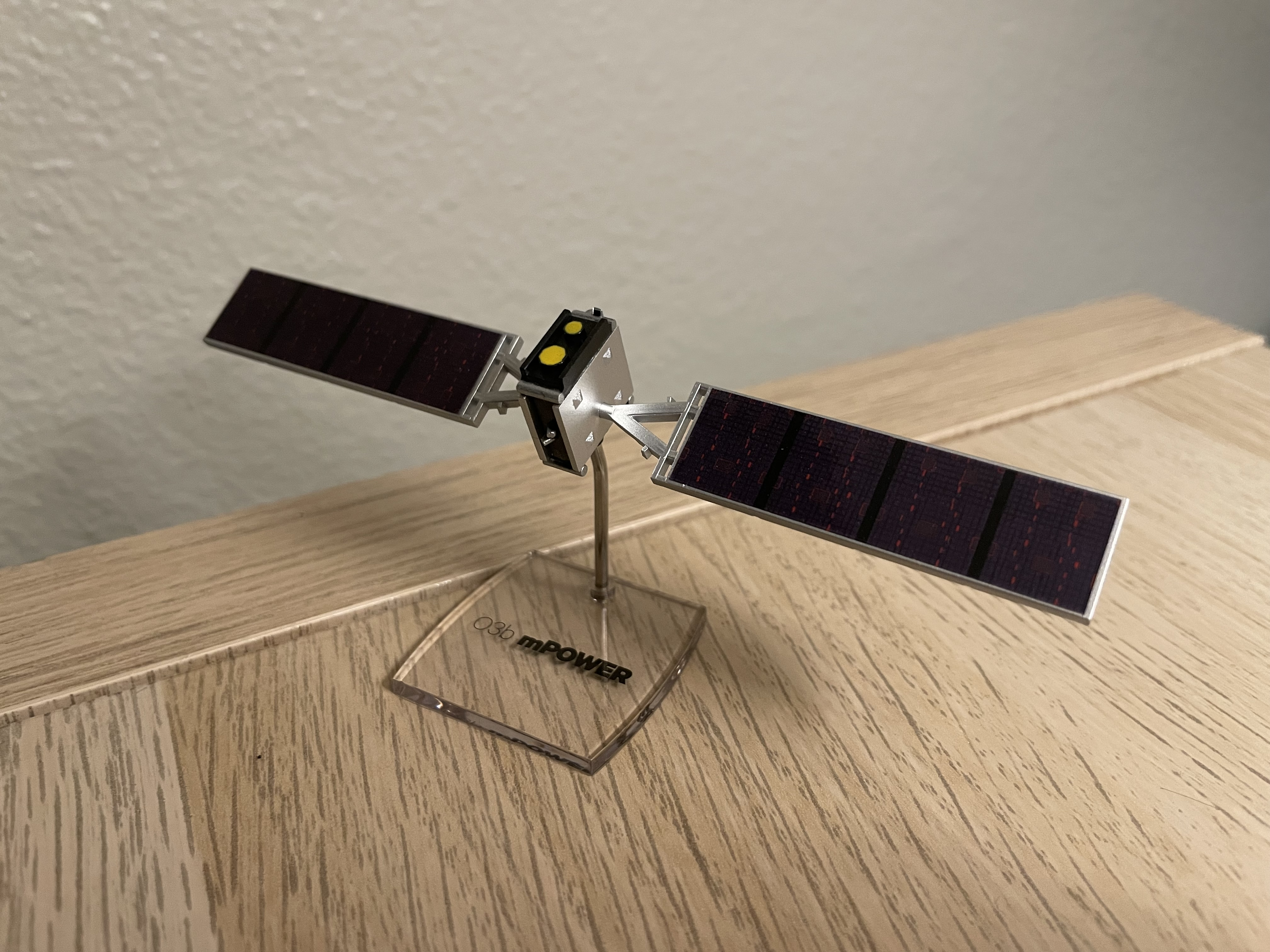
- Desktop model of an O3b mPOWER satellite
- Mission type: Communications
- Operator: (Luxembourg) SES
- Mission duration: 12 years (planned)

Spacecraft properties
- Bus: Boeing 702X
- Manufacturer: Boeing
- Launch mass: 1,700 kg (3,700 lb)

Start of mission
- Launch date: 16 December 2022
- Rocket: Falcon 9 Block 5
- Launch site: Cape Canaveral, SLC-40
- Contractor: SpaceX

Orbital parameters
- Reference system: Geocentric orbit
- Regime: Medium Earth orbit
- Altitude: 8,000 km (5,000 mi)
- SES Satellite Fleet

O3b mPOWER is a communications satellite system owned and operated by the Luxembourgish company SES. The system uses high-throughput and low-latency satellites in a medium Earth orbit (MEO), along with ground infrastructure and intelligent software, to provide multiple terabits of global broadband connectivity for applications including cellular backhaul and international IP trunking, cruise line connectivity, disaster recovery, and military communications. The first O3b mPOWER satellites were launched in December 2022 and the system became operational in April 2024 with 6 satellites. Two further satellites were launched in December 2024, and the system's capacity will be increased by a further 5 satellites launched by 2026.

The O3b mPOWER satellites use fully shapable and steerable spot beams that can be shifted and scaled in real time to suit individual users. The satellites join SES' existing constellation of 20 first-generation O3b satellites in MEO and they can be used in conjunction with them, with the SES's fleet of geostationary satellites, and with SpaceX's Starlink low Earth orbit (LEO) satellite constellation, providing full multi-orbit capability.

== Satellites ==
The O3b mPOWER satellites are based on Boeing's multi-orbit BSS-702X satellite bus with an all-electric propulsion system and a payload that can be reprogrammed from the ground to reallocate resources "on the fly".

The electronically steered phased array antennas can provide up to 5000 spot beams per satellite each shaped and pointed as required to specifically distribute power and bandwidth to individual user's terminals and, using the full Ka-band spectrum, enable uncontended speeds from 50 Mbit/s up to 10 Gbit/s.

With frequency reuse, each O3b mPOWER satellite can deliver hundreds of gigabits in capacity, with multi-terabit capabilities across the full constellation. SES' Adaptive Resource Control (ARC) software and digital payload processing systems synchronise space and ground system resources to electronically control routing, power levels, throughput, and frequency allocation dynamically, in real time.

When the first four satellites were in orbit, and the fifth and sixth about to be launched, it was discovered that they were afflicted with electrical issues that reduce their operational life and broadband capacity. Satellites 5 and 6 were nevertheless launched in November 2023, to maintain the initial service start date. To achieve the performance originally expected from the whole system, modifications were made to satellites 7–11, under construction by Boeing, and two additional craft added to the constellation.

== Coverage ==
From MEO, the O3b mPOWER satellite constellation can deliver high-bandwidth connectivity between latitudes 50° N and 50° S (covering 96% of the global population) to mobile and/or remote terminals of 0.3 m to 5.5 m, and is finding application in the following markets:

- Mobility: cruise, commercial shipping, aero
- Telecom: telco, mobile network operators, cloud providers
- Government: military, government agencies, non-governmental organisations
- Enterprise: oil and gas, mining

Proposed additional satellites operating in a second medium earth orbit at an inclination of 70° would give near-complete global coverage.

== History ==
=== Contracts ===
In 2020, Orange, a user of the first generation O3b system in Africa and the Middle East, adopted the O3b mPOWER system, to extend its consumer and business broadband services in Africa, providing connectivity to remote locations, starting in the Central African Republic.

In September 2020, SES and Microsoft announced that SES was the medium Earth orbit connectivity partner for the Microsoft Azure Orbital ground station service that enables network operators to control their satellite operations and capacity from within the Azure cloud computing service. Under their agreement, SES and Microsoft will jointly invest in Azure Orbital ground stations for the MEO and Earth Observation segments, initially in the United States, which will be installed and managed by SES. Also, satellite telemetry, tracking and control systems and data ground stations for the O3b mPOWER satellites will be located with Microsoft's Azure edge sites to provide O3b mPOWER customers with "one-hop" access to Azure cloud services.

In December 2020, SES agreed with Australian telco, Pivotel Group Pty to build a new ground station at Pivotel's teleport in Dubbo, New South Wales to use the O3b mPOWER system to provide high-speed, low-latency connectivity across Australia, New Zealand and the Pacific Islands.

In August 2021, Microsoft became the first cloud computing provider customer for the O3b satellite system, with Microsoft buying managed satellite connectivity services from SES for the Microsoft Azure cloud service. Microsoft is initially using the existing first generation O3b satellites, before upgrading to the faster broadband speeds from O3b mPOWER satellites when they come into operation in 2022.

In February 2022, SES formed a joint venture with India's biggest telephone company, Jio Platforms (JPL). The newly formed Jio Space Technology Limited will deliver broadband services in India of up to 100 Gbit/s capacity, using both the O3b mPOWER constellation and SES's SES-12 high-throughput geostationary satellite, to extend JPL's terrestrial network, enhancing access to digital services in unconnected areas within India and the region. JPL and SES will own 51% and 49% equity stake respectively in the new company.

In March 2022, SES announced the acquisition of DRS Global Enterprise Solutions (GES), a US-based subsidiary of defence contractor, Leonardo DRS which provides managed satcom services to the US Defence Department and other government agencies. When the transaction is concluded (expected towards the end of 2022 after regulatory approvals) the business will be combined with SES subsidiary, SES Government Solutions (now SES Space & Defense), greatly expanding market access for the O3b mPOWER system at the time it is planned to begin operations.

In May 2022, SES subsidiary SES Government Solutions (now SES Space & Defense), in partnership with Earth imaging company Planet Labs PBC, was awarded a US$28.96 million contract from NASA’s Communications Services Project for real-time, always-on low-latency connectivity services to NASA spacecraft, using SES's geostationary orbit satellites and medium Earth orbit satellites, including the O3b mPOWER constellation.

In June 2022, SES announced that it will provide global connectivity services to MSC Cruises using the O3b mPOWER system. The service will start on the Explora I, the first ship of MSC's forthcoming luxury cruise line Explora Journeys, expected to enter service in Spring 2023.

In October 2022, SES announced a capacity deal with telco, Claro Brasil (through its Embratel division) to use the O3b mPOWER network to extend its mobile backhaul service serving more than 260,000 inhabitants of the eight cities in the isolated Amazon region. SES already serves other communities in the region with backhaul capacity delivered via its geostationary satellite. The O3b mPOWER network will provide 4 Gbit/s and will be able to support both 4G and 5G networks.

In June 2023, the Luxembourg Parliament approved funding of €195m over 10 years for the Medium Earth Orbit Global Services programme to provide capacity on the O3b mPOWER network for defence, security, and disaster recovery, to Luxembourg, its partners and NATO.

In November 2023, the US Department of Defense awarded SES a blanket purchase agreement worth up to US$270 million over five years for global HTS managed services on the O3b system.

In May 2024, SES announced the Open Orbits Inflight Connectivity Network which combines SES's Ka-band GEO satellite network and the O3b mPOWER network with independent satellite networks of regional operators, including NEO Space Group, AeroSat Link, and Hughes Communications India, to enable inflight video and data connectivity to seamlessly move between operators as an aircraft traverses the globe. In October 2024, national airlines, Thai Airways and Turkish Airlines selected SES Open Orbits for aircraft across their fleets.

In September 2024, the NATO Support and Procurement Agency awarded its first contract for MEO satellite services to SES, to provide NATO members with capacity on the O3b mPOWER network for secure naval, air, and ground communications missions around the globe. In February 2025, the O3b mPOWER constellation started providing connectivity services to the US and Luxembourg governments under the MEO Global Services contract.

In July 2026, SES reached an agreement with Starlab Space to provide communication services to its Starlab space station using the O3b mPOWER constellation.

=== Development ===
In September 2019, SpaceX was contracted to launch the first seven O3b mPOWER satellites using Falcon 9 rockets with two launches of four and three satellites planned for 2021.

In August 2020, the order for an additional four O3b mPOWER satellites, also from Boeing, was announced. These satellites will be more powerful than the original seven, increasing the total throughput of the entire O3b mPOWER constellation by 90%. The expected launch pattern for the whole O3b mPOWER constellation was also changed, with SpaceX contracted to provide two further launches on Falcon 9 rockets, each rocket carrying a maximum of three satellites, and the first three satellites expected to launch late in 2021, six more on two launches in 2022, and the final two in 2024.

In November 2022, SES announced further delays to the O3b mPOWER launch schedule. The first two O3b mPOWER satellites would now be launched in mid-December 2022, The next four satellites would be carried on two launches in Q1 2023, two more on another launch later in 2023, and the final three satellites launched in 2024. it will take approximately six months after launch for each satellite to reach its designated orbit and for commissioning, and the O3b mPower service is now expected to start in Q3 2023. In August 2023, the service start date was revised to Q4 2023.

=== Launches ===
On 16 December 2022, the first two O3b mPOWER satellites were successfully launched from Cape Canaveral Space Force Station in Florida at 5:48 pm local time . The two satellites had been 'mated' and fueled with the Xenon gas for their plasma thrusters at Boeing's factory in El Segundo, California before delivery to Cape Canaveral, considerably reducing the time required at the spaceport to ready them for launch.

On 28 April 2023, the second pair of O3b mPOWER satellites were successfully launched from Cape Canaveral Space Force Station in Florida at 6:12 pm local time, by which time the first pair of satellites had reached medium Earth orbit and were undergoing in-orbit testing.

On 12 November 2023, the fifth and sixth O3b mPOWER satellites were successfully launched from Cape Canaveral Space Force Station in Florida by SpaceX Falcon 9 rocket. The two satellites will join O3b mPOWER 1 and 2 (launched in December 2022) and O3b mPOWER 3 and 4 (launched in April 2023) in medium Earth orbit (MEO) and enable the start of the service in February 2024.

On 17 December 2024, the seventh and eighth O3b mPOWER satellites were successfully launched from Kennedy Space Center in Florida by SpaceX Falcon 9 rocket. The two satellites, upgraded to address power issues that hampered the first six O3b mPOWER satellites (announced by SES in October 2023) reached medium Earth orbit (MEO) in April 2025, and started service to boost the capacity and resilience of the constellation in June 2025.

In September 2026, the satellites 11, 12, and 13 were launched by Falcon 9, on the 700th mission of SpaceX's Falcon rocket family.

== List of satellites ==
Name	SATCAT	COSPAR ID	Launch date	Launch vehicle	Orbital apsis	Inclination	Status
O3b mPOWER 1 (O3b FM21)	54755	2022-174A	16 December 2022	Falcon 9 Block 5	8064.7 km × 8081.3 km	0.038°	Operational
O3b mPOWER 2 (O3b FM22)	54756	2022-174B	16 December 2022	Falcon 9 Block 5	8064.5 km × 8081.7 km	0.036°	Operational
O3b mPOWER 3 (O3b FM23)	56368	2023-059B	28 April 2023	Falcon 9 Block 5	8063.7 km × 8082.3 km	0.056°	Operational
O3b mPOWER 4 (O3b FM24)	56367	2023-059A	28 April 2023	Falcon 9 Block 5	8065.6 km × 8080.4 km	0.054°	Operational
O3b mPOWER 5 (O3b FM25)	58346	2023-175A	12 November 2023	Falcon 9 Block 5	8062.2 km × 8083.8 km	0.061°	Operational
O3b mPOWER 6 (O3b FM26)	58347	2023-175B	12 November 2023	Falcon 9 Block 5	8062.6 km × 8083.4 km	0.057°	Operational
O3b mPOWER 7 (O3b FM27)	62362	2023-244A	17 December 2024	Falcon 9 Block 5	8065.4 km × 8080.7 km	0.028°	Operational
O3b mPOWER 8 (O3b FM28)	62363	2023-244B	17 December 2024	Falcon 9 Block 5	8063.5 km × 8082.6 km	0.079°	Operational
O3b mPOWER 9 (O3b FM29)	64866	2025-153A	22 July 2025	Falcon 9 Block 5	8063.3 km × 8082.7 km	0.1°	Operational
O3b mPOWER 10 (O3b FM30)	64867	2025-153B	22 July 2025	Falcon 9 Block 5	8069.5 km × 8076.6 km	0.1°	Operational
O3b mPOWER 11 (O3b FM31)			13 September 2026	Falcon 9 Block 5			Operational
O3b mPOWER 12 (O3b FM32)			13 September 2026	Falcon 9 Block 5			Operational
O3b mPOWER 13 (O3b FM33)			13 September 2026	Falcon 9 Block 5			Operational

== See also ==
- O3b
- SES
- O3b Networks
- Boeing 702 satellite bus
- SpaceX
- Satellite Internet
- Satellite internet constellation
