= Blanket order =

Type of purchase order

A blanket order, blanket purchase agreement or call-off order is a purchase order which a customer places with its supplier to allow multiple delivery dates over a period of time, often negotiated to take advantage of predetermined pricing. It is normally used when there is a recurring need for expendable goods. Blanket orders are often used when a customer buys large quantities and has obtained special discounts. Based on the blanket order, sales orders ('blanket releases' or 'release orders') and invoice items can be created as needed until the contract is fulfilled, the end of the order period is reached or a predetermined maximum order value is reached.

== Benefits ==
Issuing a blanket order allows a customer not to hold more stock than necessary at any time, and avoids the administrative expense of processing frequent purchase orders, while favoring discount pricing through volume commitments or price-breaks. On the supplier's side, a blanket order may provide the benefit of guaranteeing ongoing business and also help suppliers better predict future cash flows and orders.

A blanket order is set at a fixed priced contract for a period of time. The buyer looks for the best pricing among competing supplier bids. After the best one is chosen, the prices of goods are fixed, and also quantities of each product are given to the supplier to prepare stock for on requested delivery.

Forecasted quantity is provided by the buyer as full usage quantity recorded historically a few years or as needed for quantitative analysis. The supplier may give a condition of quantity to supply for this [contract]. For example, 80% of the forecast quantity must be bought at the end of the contract, which may be one or two years.

The blanket order will charge the delayed delivery if the supplier could not supply the products in the contract on time. Anyway, since the supplier has already kept the stock for ready delivery for the first year or agreed period, if the buyer could not fulfill the contract's conditions, such as "must buy 80% of forecast quantity within a year," the contract may be extended, or the delay charge could be no more, or no other charges requested by the buyer.

Realistically, at the end of the blanket order contract, the buyer would not buy at forecasted quantity as agreed in the contract say, 80% of the demand sent to the supplier. The buyer will also allow the supplier to sell the products in the contract to reduce the quantity. The supplier also has to talk and inform the buyer about the quantities of goods kept in order that the buyer could know the status of the stock. Before the buyer issuing the purchase order to the supplier, the buyer must ask the supplier first about stock availability to avoid the problem from no stock availability.

Libraries use the term "blanket order" to cover their agreements with publishers to purchase "all of a certain set of publications". Blanket orders or call-off orders may also be used for ordering services, for example for maintenance and repair services. In these cases, the benefits associated with stock-holding do not arise but the call-off order may allow emergency repairs or on-call maintenance to be arranged easily at guaranteed rates.

== Difficulties ==
The most difficult part of having a contract is determining the forecast quantity arranged by the user of the product. As the forecast quantity can be difficult to get, the supplier must be aware of the quantity to keep in stock. An easy way to do this is to discuss with the buyer what quantity to keep in stock. For example, they might keep only 20% in stock in the first 6 months, so that the supplier and the buyer are able to review the quantity and adjust it appropriately. This reduces the stock burden of the supplier during the contract period and might help the buyer at the end of the contract if the stock does not move as quickly as anticipated. The contract might be extended year after year, but it can be adjusted each time as more relevant forecasting history will predicate the need to decrease or increase stock requirements. Alternatively, some companies may utilize forecasted information via a material requirements planning system to determine appropriate stock quantities throughout the product's life cycle.

== Federal Acquisition Regulation ==
The United States' Federal Acquisition Regulation uses the term "blanket purchase agreements" or BPAs at FAR 8.405-3:

Ordering activities may establish BPAs under any schedule contract to fill repetitive needs for supplies or services.

The Regulation notes a preference in favour of establishing multiple-award BPAs where practicable, rather than only awarding a single-award BPA.

According to the U.S. General Services Administration, BPAs:

- Provide opportunities to negotiate improved discounts
- Satisfy recurring requirements
- Reduce administrative costs by eliminating repetitive acquisition efforts
- Permit ordering activities to leverage buying power through volume purchasing
- Enable ordering activities streamlined ordering procedures
- Permit ordering activities to incorporate Contractor Team Arrangements (CTAs)
- Reduce procurement lead time
- Allow ordering activities the ability to incorporate additional agency or local terms and conditions not in conflict with the underlying contract.

== See also ==
- General order
- Invoice
- Purchase order
- Remittance advice
- Sales order
