= Emergency Response Unit (IFRC) =

An Emergency Response Unit (ERU) is an international standardized disaster relief unit established by the International Federation of Red Cross and Red Crescent Societies. It can provide specific services where local infrastructure is damaged or temporarily out of use.

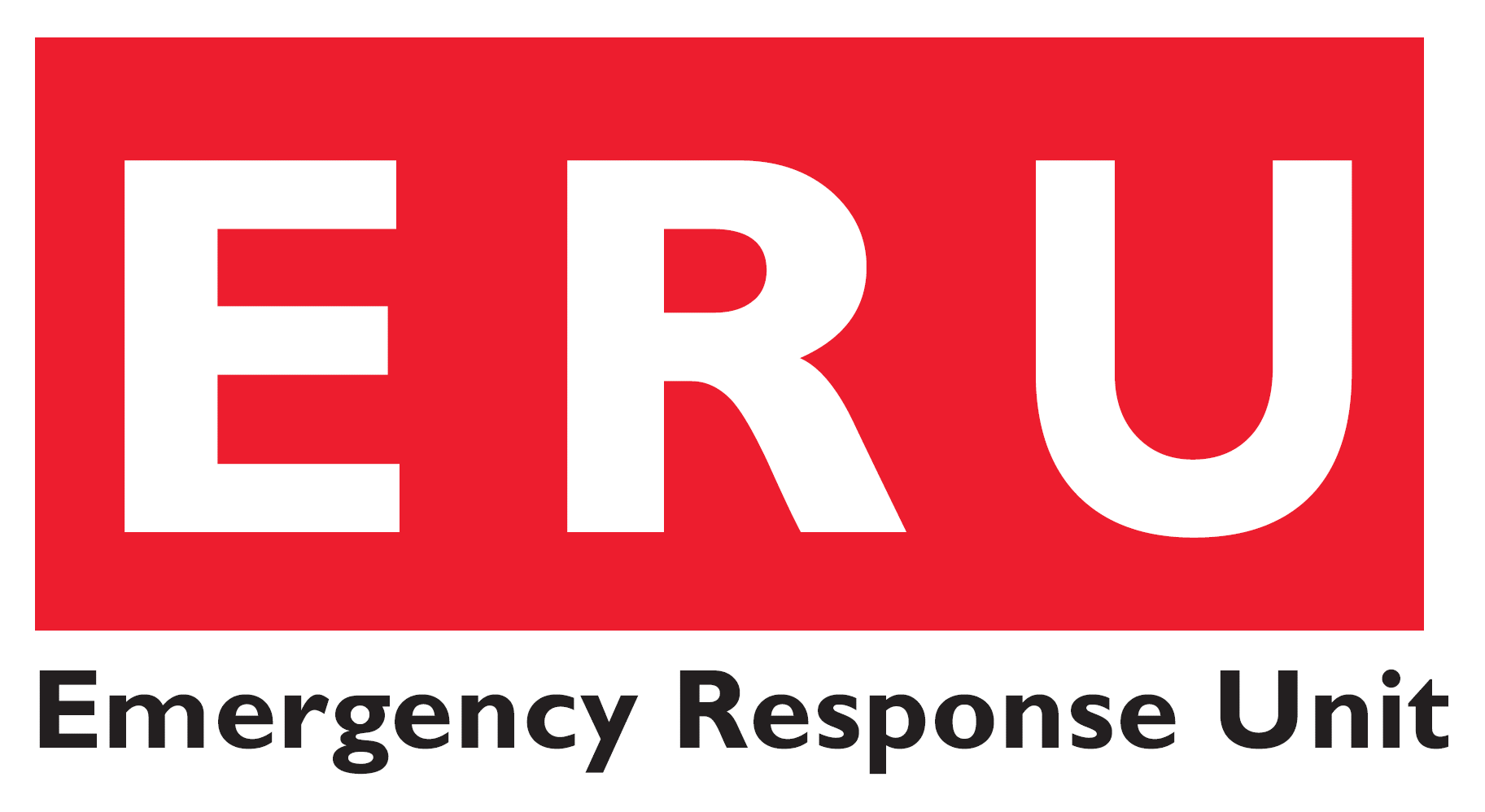
The official logo of the ERU

== History ==
At the end of 1994 the International Federation of Red Cross and Red Crescent Societies (IFRC) introduced the concept of standardised, autonomous units to support and quickly coordinate with national Red Cross Societies in case of a disaster.

Between 1994 and 2011, the IFRC has deployed over 200 disaster teams.

Notable deployments

- 2004: After the Indian Ocean earthquake and tsunami, 25 teams were deployed.
- 2005: After the Pakistan earthquake, 31 teams were deployed.
- 2010: After the Haiti earthquake, 21 teams were deployed.

== ERU deployment procedure ==
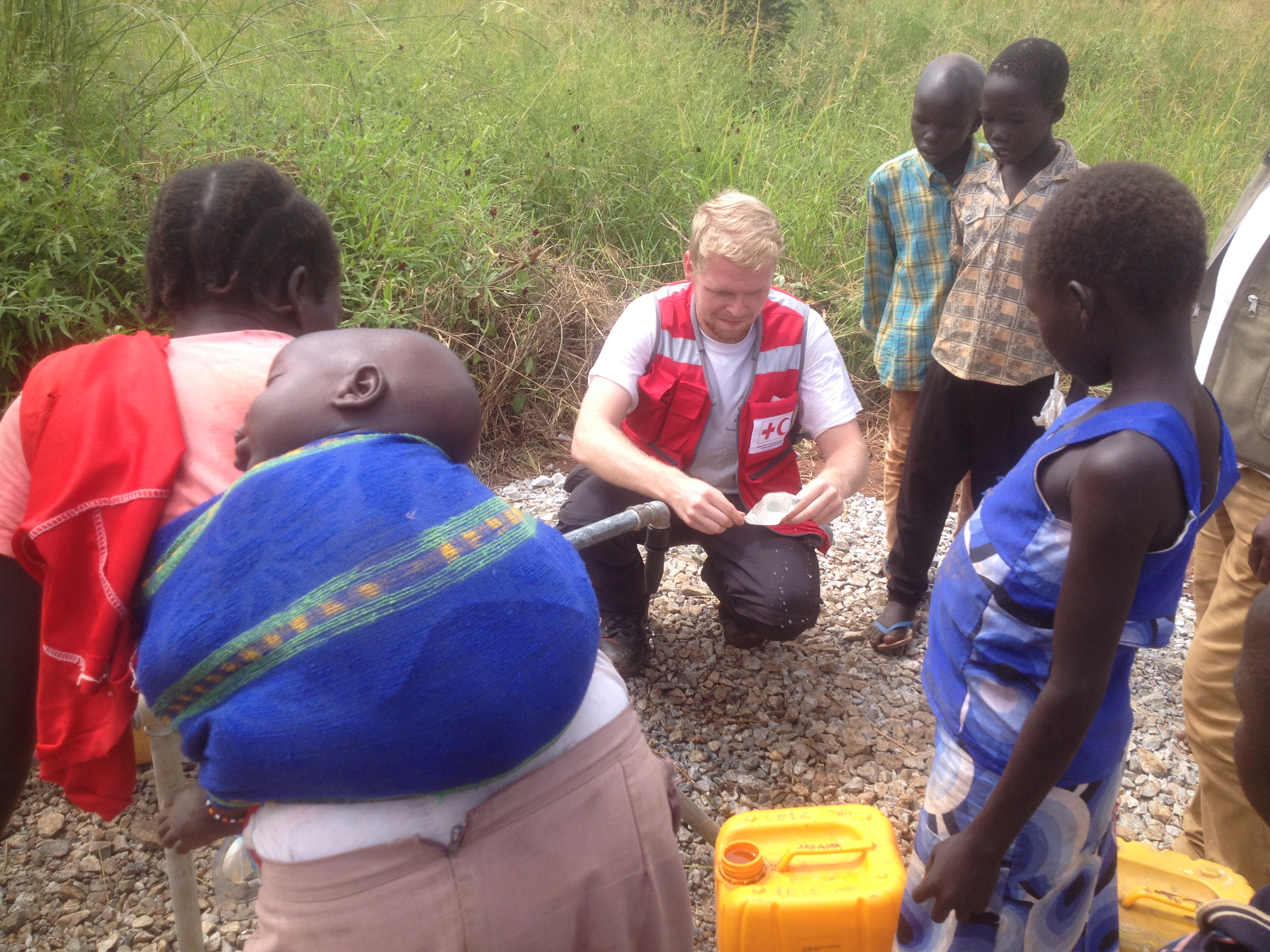
ERU drinking water specialists taking water sample.

After a disaster, the local Red Cross Society immediately responds by assessing the situation. If the local Society decides they can't handle it themselves they send a request to the Red Cross Headquarters in Geneva. The Headquarters quickly deploys a FACT-Team and sends a request to the national societies which provide ERUs. This request is to assess how much staff is available for a mission into the affected country and if they can deploy a whole unit, only personnel or only materials.

After about 24 hours, the ERU providing societies and the FACT-Team reports to the headquarters. Now the International Red Cross decides which units will be sent and also the composition of the units. For example, IFRC decides to send a supplied Water and Sanitation unit, consisting of two members from Austria who lead the unit, a specialist from Sweden, and two from Spain.

Now the staff from the other countries will be flown to the leading country. Meanwhile, the leading country handles the logistics of travelling to the affected area. They secure a transport plane and manage the paperwork, including visa, customs and funding. Upon arrival, all team members get a briefing about the general situation, safety situation and also cultural adaption. Typical deployment time is about four to seven days.

The duration is about five weeks until the next rotation of ERU members arrives and overtake the operation. An ERU deployment normally has a maximum of six month, because after that normally the mission becomes more and more the character of rebuilding. Because normally the mission is funded of donation which is committed to the disaster and after six month it's hard to argue that the situation is still an impact of the disaster. Most of the time rebuild projects will be started after that.

It is also common that the equipment stay in the country, because the transport back would be more expensive and in most cases at the end of the mission the national staff is perfectly trained. So that, if a disaster happens again, they can immediately start to help.

== Specific units ==
=== FACT-Team ===
FACT-Teams can be deployed within 24 hours and comprise highly trained and experienced disaster managers. They report to headquarters in a very detailed way, how the situation is and what kind of support the national organisation needs. (In fact, FACT-Teams are not an ERU-Unit, but are a very important part of the disaster relief system.)

=== IT and Telecom ===
Are deployed to establish local communication networks and ensure the information system in the operation works. They also responsible to assist the national society with its communication systems. They are using field proven technology like satellite phone systems, high frequency (HF) and very high frequency (VHF) radio systems.

=== Water and sanitation ===
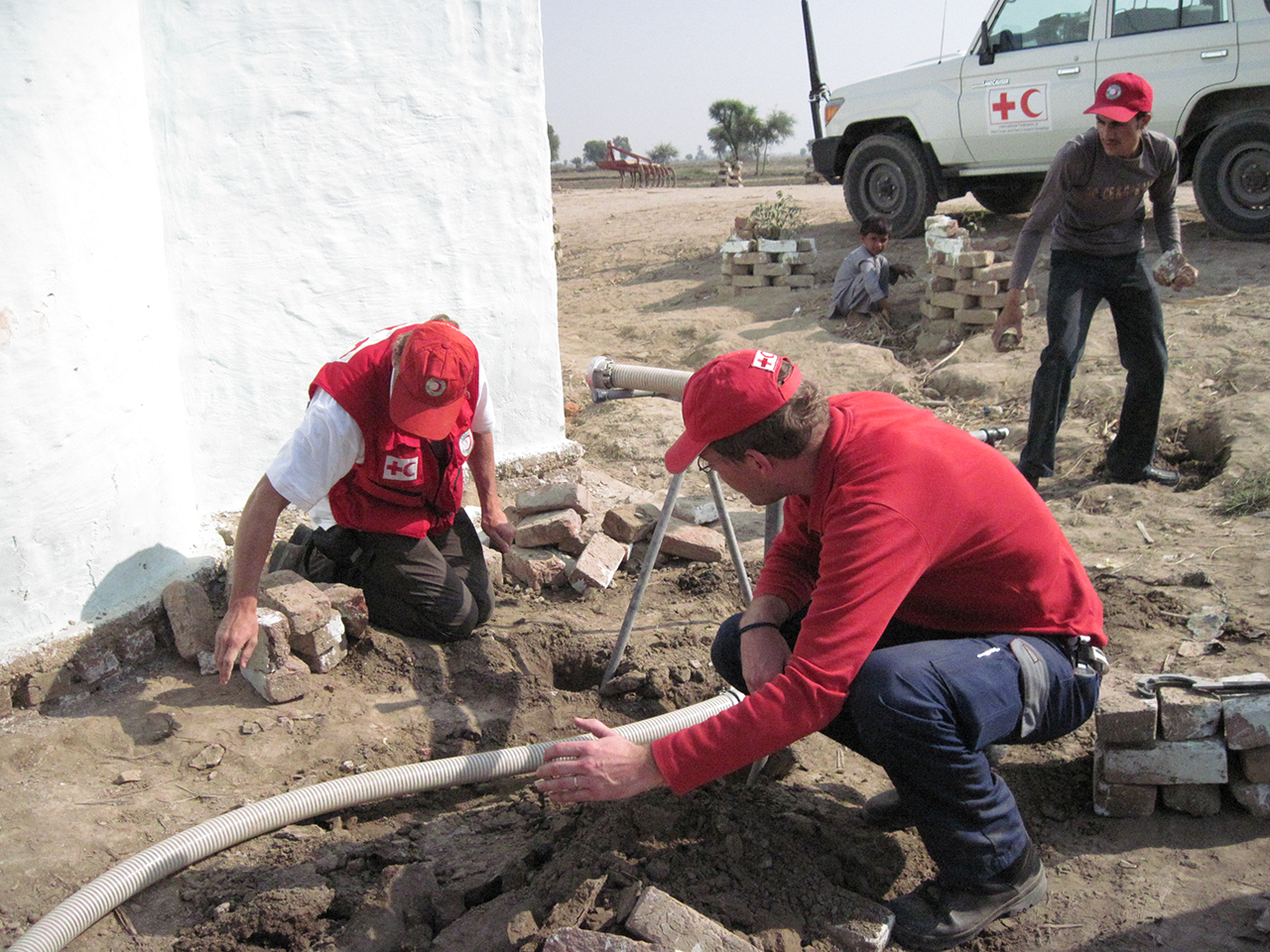
ERU drinking water specialists building a water distribution system.

Clear drinking water and hygiene training are two key aspects of working hygiene. This unit provides water purification and distribution as well as the planning and initiating of latrine construction programmes, garbage collection and disposal programmes, burial of corpses, vector control and protection such as spraying of health installations, latrines, garbage disposal points, stagnant water ponds against flies, fleas, rats, and mosquitoes, initiating hygiene education and promotion.

These units have several modules, which they can be deployed with:

==== Module 15 ====
The module has a principle treatment and distribution capacity of 120,000 litres per day (10 hours operational time) of safe drinking water according to WHO/SPHERE standards and a storage capacity of max. 200,000 litres per day and provides basic sanitation systems for up to 15,000 beneficiaries. Its weight is about 15MT and uses a volume of 70m³.

==== Module 40 ====
This module provides safe drinking water for up to 40,000 beneficiaries, also according to WHO/SPHERE standards. It has the maximum capacity to treat, supply and store up to 600,000 litres of water per day. The module comprises two identical treatment and supply lines, each provides water for 20,000 beneficiaries. The module weight about 11MT and uses 45m³ space.

==== Module Mass Sanitation 20 ====
Mass water is different from the highly purified water from the Module 15 &40. It is only cleaned from germs, but particles will still be there. The module has the capacity to provide a maximum of 40,000 beneficiaries with basic sanitation facilities.

==== Module Poolfilter ====
This is a new module and at the moment in an experimental status. It supports only about XXXXX litres a day, which means you have to use more of these modules in parallel operation. But the benefits are you can have more, smaller water plants which reduces long transport ways, it uses less space and weight in transportation and it's also cheaper.

=== Logistics ===
This unit is responsible to manage the arrival, storage and distribution of relief and supply goods. This includes the organising and tracking of transportation and also to support other ERU-units which arrive with more and heavier equipment. It is modular to guaranty a high rate of flexibility and versatility in the field.

=== Basic health care ===
Their function is to provide immediate basic curative and preventive health care, according to WHO standards. They are using a modular system depending on local needs they can support up to 30,000 people. It does not function as a hospital but has an overnight capacity of 10−20 beds for observation.

=== Referral hospital ===
This units is in other words a field hospital and provides the medical care for approximately 250,000 people. Including general medicine, internal medicine surgery (including traumatology and anesthesia), x-ray and a laboratory.

=== Relief ===
This units task is mainly to support the national Red Cross society by undertaking relief assessment and the distribution of food, water and other relief goods. They can also work with logistics or basecamp units.

== ERUs by country ==
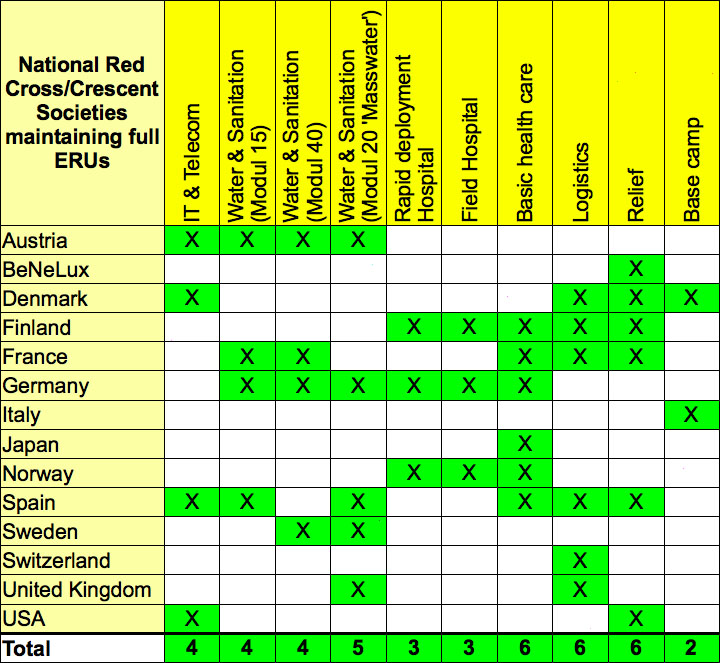
Summary of ERU-Units retrieved 2010

=== Austria ===
The Austrian Red Cross has 4 ERU teams. 3 specialised on Water and Sanitation (Wash M40, Wash MSM20 and Wash M15) and IT and Telecom and are highly experienced.

=== Canada ===
The Canadian Red Cross has 2 units able to be deployed in the fields of Basic Health Care and Referral Hospital.

=== Germany ===
German Red Cross has 5 units working in the field of Basic Health Care, Referral Hospital, and Water and Sanitation (Wash M15, Wash MSM20 and Wash M40).

=== Other countries ===
The following countries also have complete ERU-Units: Philippines, Belgium, Netherlands and Luxembourg, Denmark, Finland, France, United Kingdom, Italy, Japan, New Zealand, Norway, Sweden, Switzerland, Spain and the United States.

Additionally, Australia, Croatia, Hong Kong, Iceland and North Macedonia support relief efforts with trained staff members.
