= Medium Earth orbit =

Earth-centered orbit above low Earth orbit and below geostationary orbit

Clickable image, highlighting medium altitude orbits around Earth, (Note: Orbital periods and speeds are calculated using the relations 4π^{2}R^{3} = T^{2}GM and V^{2}R = GM, where R is the radius of orbit in metres; T is the orbital period in seconds; V is the orbital speed in m/s; G is the gravitational constant, approximately 6.673×10^{−11} Nm^{2}/kg^{2}; M is the mass of Earth, approximately 5.98×10^{24} kg (1.318×10^{25} lb).) from Low Earth to the lowest High Earth orbit (geostationary orbit and its graveyard orbit, at one ninth of the Moon's orbital distance), (Note: Approximately 8.6 times when the Moon is nearest (that is, (363,104 km)/(42,164 km)), to 9.6 times when the Moon is farthest (that is, (405,696 km)/(42,164 km))) with the Van Allen radiation belts and the Earth to scale

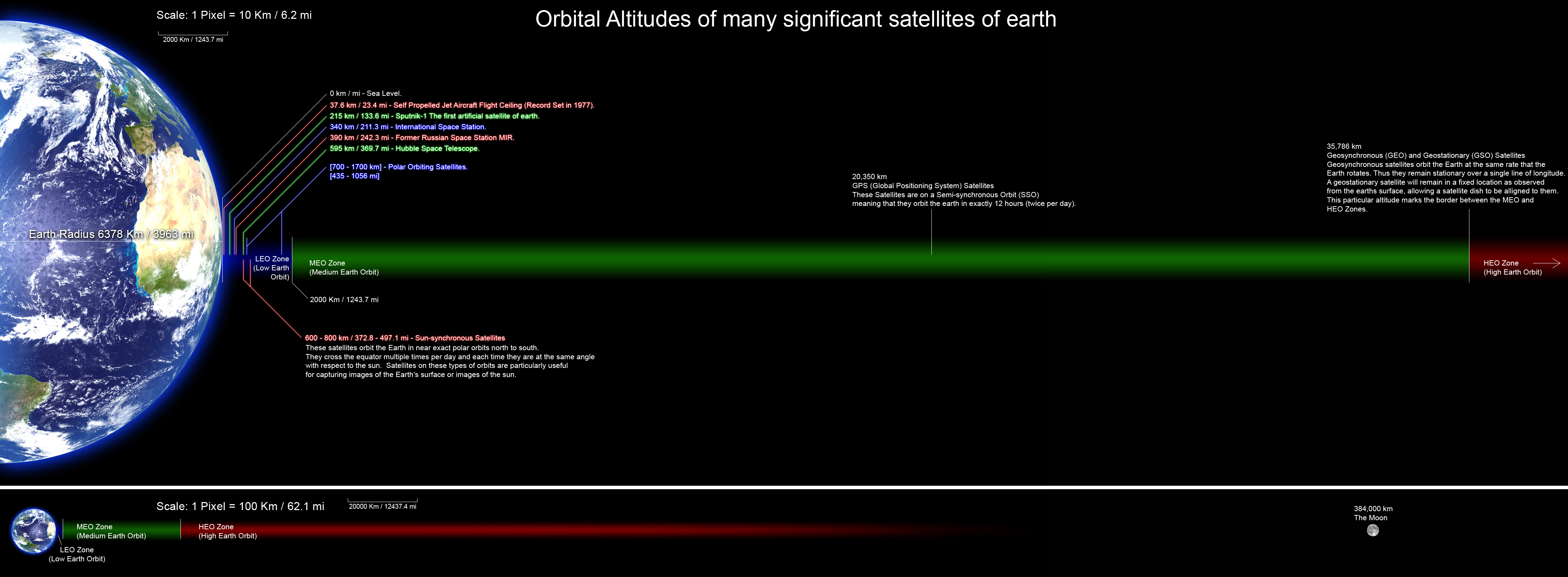
To-scale diagram of low, medium, and high Earth orbits

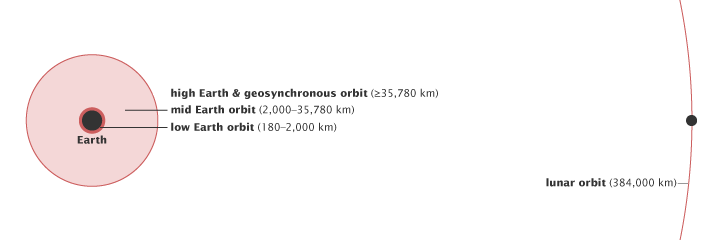
Space of Medium Earth orbits (MEO) as pink area, with Earth and the distance of the orbit of the Moon for reference and to scale

A medium Earth orbit (MEO) is an Earth-centered orbit with an altitude above a low Earth orbit (LEO) and below a high Earth orbit (HEO) – between 2,000 and 35,786 km (1,243 and 22,236 mi) above sea level.

The boundary between MEO and LEO is an arbitrary altitude chosen by accepted convention, whereas the boundary between MEO and HEO is the particular altitude of a geosynchronous orbit, in which a satellite takes 24 hours to circle the Earth, the same period as the Earth’s own rotation. All satellites in MEO have an orbital period of less than 24 hours, with the minimum period (for a circular orbit at the lowest MEO altitude) about 2 hours.

Satellites in MEO orbits are perturbed by solar radiation pressure, which is the dominating non-gravitational perturbing force. Other perturbing forces include: Earth's albedo, navigation antenna thrust, and thermal effects related to heat re-radiation.

The MEO region includes the two zones of energetic charged particles above the equator known as the Van Allen radiation belts, which can damage satellites’ electronic systems without special shielding.

A medium Earth orbit is sometimes called mid Earth orbit or intermediate circular orbit (ICO).

== Applications ==
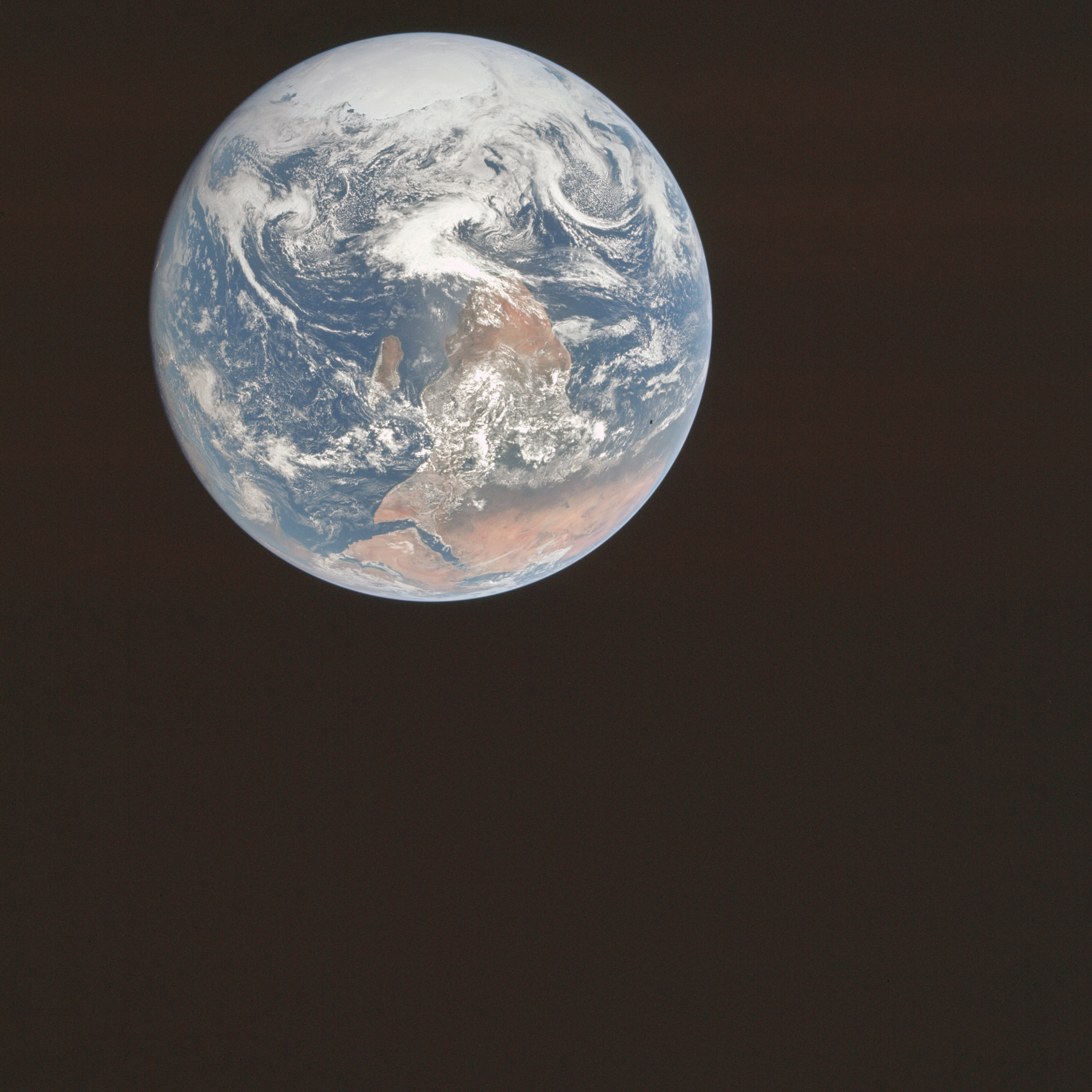
A camera photo of Earth from a distance of 29,400 kilometers (18,300 miles), a distance of higher medium Earth orbits (uncropped and unrotated The Blue Marble image, from Apollo 17 during lunar transfer)

Two medium Earth orbits are particularly significant. A satellite in the semi-synchronous orbit at an altitude of approximately 20,200 kilometres (12,600 mi) has an orbital period of 12 hours and passes over the same two spots on the equator every day. This reliably predictable orbit is used by the Global Positioning System (GPS) constellation. Other navigation satellite systems use similar medium Earth orbits including GLONASS (with an altitude of 19,100 kilometres, 11,900 mi), Galileo (with an altitude of 23,222 kilometres, 14,429 mi) and BeiDou (with an altitude of 21,528 kilometres, 13,377 mi).

The Molniya orbit has a high inclination of 63.4° and high eccentricity of 0.722 with a period of 12 hours, so a satellite spends most of its orbit above the chosen area in high latitudes. This orbit was used by the (now defunct) North American Sirius Satellite Radio and XM Satellite Radio satellites and the Russian Molniya military communications satellites, after which it is named.

Communications satellites in MEO include the O3b and O3b mPOWER constellations for low-latency broadband and data backhaul to maritime, aero and remote locations (with an altitude of 8,063 kilometres, 5,010 mi).

Communications satellites to cover the North and South Pole are sometimes placed in MEO.

Telstar 1, an experimental communications satellite launched in 1962, orbited in MEO.

In May 2022, Kazakh mobile network operator, Kcell, and satellite owner and operator, SES used SES's O3b MEO satellite constellation to demonstrate that MEO satellites could be used to provide high-speed mobile internet to remote regions of Kazakhstan for reliable video calling, conferencing and streaming, and web browsing, with a latency (delay) five times lower than on the existing platform based on geostationary orbit satellites.

In September 2023, satellite operator SES announced the first satellite internet service to use satellite constellations in both MEO and Low Earth Orbit (LEO). The SES Cruise mPOWERED + Starlink service will use SES's O3b mPOWER MEO satellites and SpaceX's Starlink LEO system to provide cruise ship passengers with internet, social media and video calls at up to 3 Gbps per ship anywhere in the World. Subsequently, in February 2024, SES announced that Virgin Voyages will be the first cruise line to deploy the service.

== Space debris ==
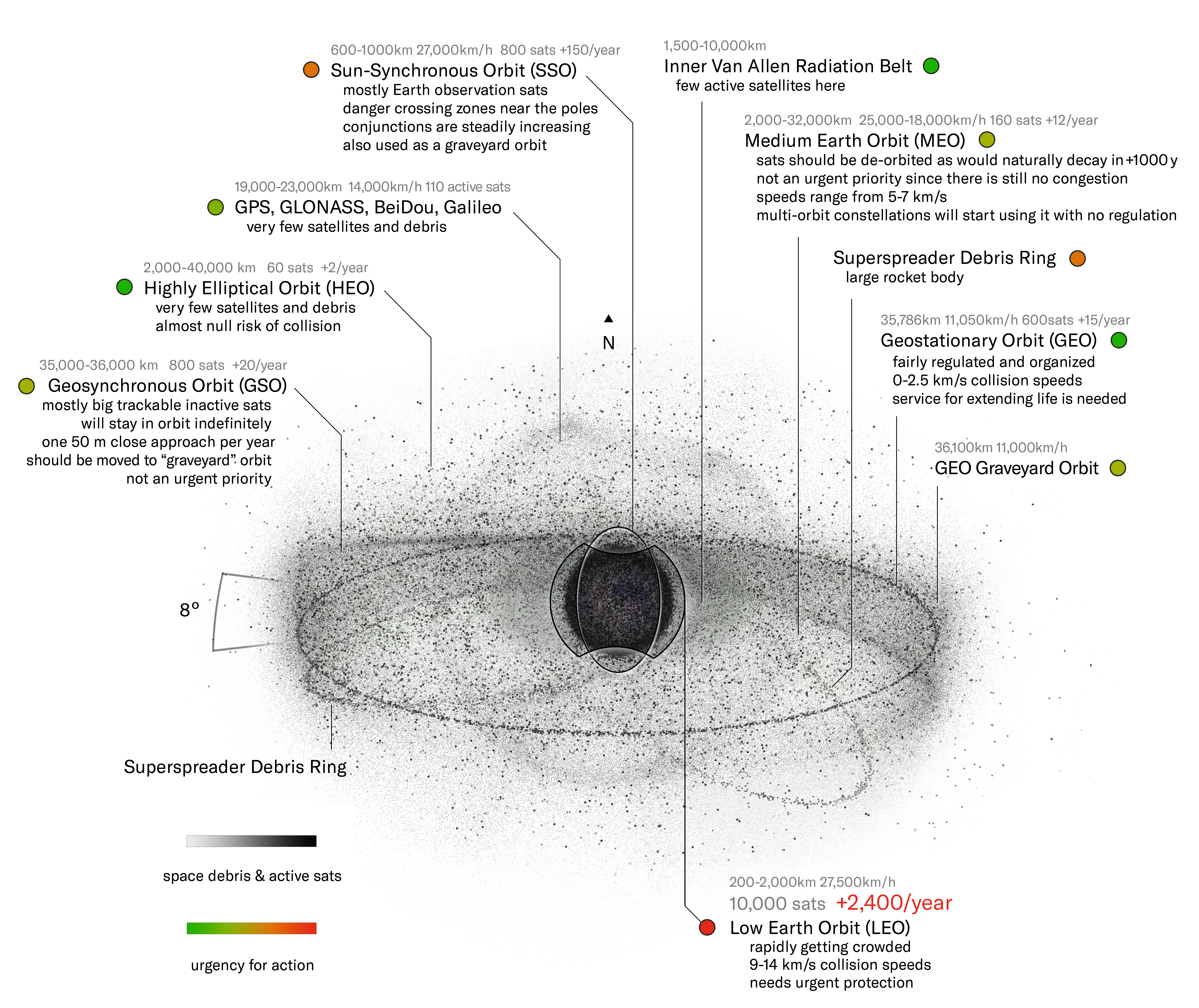
Infographic showing the space debris situation extending from low Earth orbit, across medium Earth orbits, until the lowest high Earth orbits

Space debris in medium Earth orbit stays practically permanently orbiting Earth. Most space debris extends to the lowest high Earth orbits just beyond the edge of medium Earth orbit, where geostationary satellites are and where after their end of use they are parked in similar orbits, so-called graveyard orbits.

== See also ==
- Atmospheric reentry
- Escape velocity
- Geostationary Earth orbit (GEO)
- High Earth orbit (HEO)
- Highly elliptical orbit (HEO)
- Graveyard orbit
- International Space Station
- List of orbits
- Low Earth orbit (LEO)
- Satellite phone
- Suborbital spaceflight
- Types of geocentric orbit
