= List of Zenit launches =

This is a list of launches made by the Zenit rocket. All launches were conducted from either Site 45 of the Baikonur Cosmodrome or from Sea Launch's Ocean Odyssey offshore launch platform.

== Launch statistics ==
Rockets from the Zenit family have accumulated 84 launches since 1985, 71 of which were successful, yielding a 84.5% success rate.

=== Rocket configuration ===
- Zenit-2
- Zenit-2M
- Zenit-3SL
- Zenit-3SLB
- Zenit-3F

=== Launch sites ===
- Baikonur 45/1
- Baikonur 45/2
- Ocean Odyssey

=== Launch outcomes ===
- Failure
- Partial failure
- Success
- Planned

== Launch history ==
=== 1985–1989 ===
Flight No.	Date / time (UTC)	Rocket, Configuration	Launch site	Payload	Payload mass	Orbit	Customer	Launch outcome
1	13 April 1985; 10:00	Zenit-2	Baikonur 45/1	EPN 03.0694 #1 (Tselina-2 mass simulator)		Low Earth (planned)		Failure
1	Test flight; Second stage engine failure at T+400 seconds due to flow regulator leak							
2	21 June 1985; 08:29	Zenit-2	Baikonur 45/1	EPN 03.0694 #2 (Tselina-2 mass simulator)		Low Earth (planned)		Failure
2	Test flight; Second stage vernier engines exploded due to clogged oxidizer inlet valve							
3	22 October 1985; 07:00	Zenit-2	Baikonur 45/1	Kosmos 1697 (EPN 03.0694 #3) (Tselina-2 mass simulator)		Low Earth		Success
3	Test flight							
4	28 December 1985; 09:16	Zenit-2	Baikonur 45/1	Kosmos 1714 (Tselina-2)		Low Earth		Partial failure
4	ELINT; Fairing separation mechanism failure; spacecraft deployed into unusable orbit							
5	30 July 1986; 08:30	Zenit-2	Baikonur 45/1	Kosmos 1767 (EPN 03.0695 #1) (Mass simulator)		Low Earth		Success
5	Test flight; Test flight of Zenit-2 rocket with maximum payload							
6	22 October 1986; 08:00	Zenit-2	Baikonur 45/1	Kosmos 1786 (Taifun-1B)		Low Earth		Success
6	Radar calibration							
7	14 February 1987; 08:30	Zenit-2	Baikonur 45/1	Kosmos 1820 (EPN 03.0695 #2) (Mass simulator)		Low Earth		Success
7	Test flight; Test flight of Zenit-2 rocket with maximum payload							
8	18 March 1987; 08:30	Zenit-2	Baikonur 45/1	Kosmos 1833 (EPN 03.0694 #4) (Tselina-2 mass simulator)		Low Earth		Success
8	Test flight							
9	13 May 1987; 05:40	Zenit-2	Baikonur 45/1	Kosmos 1844 (Tselina-2)		Low Earth		Success
9	ELINT							
10	1 August 1987; 03:59	Zenit-2	Baikonur 45/1	Kosmos 1871 (EPN 03.0695 #3) (Mass simulator)		Low Earth		Success
10	Test flight; Test flight of Zenit-2 rocket with maximum payload							
11	28 August 1987; 08:20	Zenit-2	Baikonur 45/1	Kosmos 1873 (EPN 03.0695 #4) (Mass simulator)		Low Earth		Success
11	Test flight; Test flight of Zenit-2 rocket with maximum payload							
12	15 May 1988; 09:20	Zenit-2	Baikonur 45/1	Kosmos 1943 (Tselina-2)		Low Earth		Success
12	ELINT							
13	23 November 1988; 14:50	Zenit-2	Baikonur 45/1	Kosmos 1980 (Tselina-2)		Low Earth		Success
13	ELINT							
=== 1990–1994 ===
Flight No.	Date / time (UTC)	Rocket, Configuration	Launch site	Payload	Payload mass	Orbit	Customer	Launch outcome
14	22 May 1990; 05:14	Zenit-2	Baikonur 45/2	Kosmos 2082 (Tselina-2)		Low Earth		Success
14	ELINT							
15	4 October 1990; 03:28	Zenit-2	Baikonur 45/2	Tselina-2		Low Earth (intended)		Failure
15	ELINT; First stage engine failure at T+3 seconds; rocket fell back on pad and exploded. Pad 45/2 never restored to flight status.							
16	30 August 1991; 08:58	Zenit-2	Baikonur 45/1	Tselina-2		Low Earth (intended)		Failure
16	ELINT; Second stage failure							
17	5 February 1992; 18:14	Zenit-2	Baikonur 45/1	Tselina-2		Low Earth (intended)		Failure
17	ELINT; Second stage failure							
18	17 November 1992; 07:47	Zenit-2	Baikonur 45/1	Kosmos 2219 (Tselina-2)		Low Earth		Success
18	ELINT							
19	25 December 1992; 05:56	Zenit-2	Baikonur 45/1	Kosmos 2227 (Tselina-2)		Low Earth		Success
19	ELINT							
20	26 March 1993; 02:21	Zenit-2	Baikonur 45/1	Kosmos 2237 (Tselina-2)		Low Earth		Success
20	ELINT							
21	16 September 1993; 07:36	Zenit-2	Baikonur 45/1	Kosmos 2263 (Tselina-2)		Low Earth		Success
21	ELINT							
22	23 April 1994; 08:02	Zenit-2	Baikonur 45/1	Kosmos 2278 (Tselina-2)		Low Earth		Success
22	ELINT							
23	26 August 1994; 12:00	Zenit-2	Baikonur 45/1	Kosmos 2290 (Orlets-2)		Low Earth		Success
23	Optical Reconnaissance							
24	4 November 1994; 05:47	Zenit-2	Baikonur 45/1	Resurs-O1 No.3		Low Earth (SSO)	Roshydromet	Success
24	Earth Observation							
25	24 November 1994; 09:16	Zenit-2	Baikonur 45/1	Kosmos 2297 (Tselina-2)		Low Earth		Success
25	ELINT							
=== 1995–1999 ===
Flight No.	Date / time (UTC)	Rocket, Configuration	Launch site	Payload	Payload mass	Orbit	Customer	Launch outcome
26	31 October 1995; 20:19	Zenit-2	Baikonur 45/1	Kosmos 2322 (Tselina-2)		Low Earth		Success
26	ELINT							
27	4 September 1996; 09:01	Zenit-2	Baikonur 45/1	Kosmos 2333 (Tselina-2)		Low Earth		Success
27	ELINT							
28	20 May 1997; 07:07	Zenit-2	Baikonur 45/1	Tselina-2		Low Earth (intended)		Failure
28	ELINT; First stage engine failure at T+48 seconds following pitch deviation.							
29	10 July 1998; 06:30	Zenit-2	Baikonur 45/1	Resurs-O1 No.4; TMSat; Techsat 1B; FASat Bravo; Safir 2 OHB-System; WESTPAC-1		Low Earth (SSO)	Roshydromet; Mahanakorn; Chilean Air Force	Success
29	Communication; Earth Observation; Technology; Geodesy							
30	28 July 1998; 09:15	Zenit-2	Baikonur 45/1	Kosmos 2360 (Tselina-2)		Low Earth		Success
30	ELINT							
31	9 September 1998; 20:29	Zenit-2	Baikonur 45/1	Globalstar 5 Globalstar 7 Globalstar 9 Globalstar 10; Globalstar 11; Globalstar 12; Globalstar 13; Globalstar 16; Globalstar 17; Globalstar 18; Globalstar 20; Globalstar 21		Low Earth (intended)	Globalstar	Failure
31	Communication; Guidance system failure at T+272 seconds caused shutdown of 2nd stage engine.							
32	28 March 1999; 01:30	Zenit-3SL	Ocean Odyssey	DemoSat		Geostationary transfer		Success
32	Test flight; Maiden launch mission of Sea Launch							
33	17 July 1999; 05:38	Zenit-2	Baikonur 45/1	Okean-O No.1		Low Earth (SSO)	NKAU/RKA	Success
33	Earth Observation							
34	10 October 1999; 03:28	Zenit-3SL	Ocean Odyssey	DirecTV-1R		Geostationary transfer	DirecTV	Success
34	Communication; First operational launch mission of Sea Launch							
=== 2000–2004 ===
Flight No.	Date / time (UTC)	Rocket, Configuration	Launch site	Payload	Payload mass	Orbit	Customer	Launch outcome
35	3 February 2000; 09:26	Zenit-2	Baikonur 45/1	Kosmos 2369 (Tselina-2)		Low Earth		Success
35	ELINT							
36	12 March 2000; 14:49	Zenit-3SL	Ocean Odyssey	ICO F-1		Medium Earth (intended)	ICO	Failure
36	Communication; Commercial launch conducted by Sea Launch. Second stage propellant pressurization system failed shortly after ignition due to a software valve command mistake.							
37	28 July 2000; 22:42	Zenit-3SL	Ocean Odyssey	PAS-9		Geostationary transfer	PanAmSat	Success
37	Communication; Commercial launch conducted by Sea Launch							
38	25 September 2000; 10:10	Zenit-2	Baikonur 45/1	Kosmos 2372 (Orlets-2)		Low Earth		Success
38	Optical Reconnaissance							
39	21 October 2000; 05:52	Zenit-3SL	Ocean Odyssey	Thuraya 1		Geostationary transfer	Thuraya	Success
39	Communication; Commercial launch conducted by Sea Launch							
40	18 March 2001; 22:33	Zenit-3SL	Ocean Odyssey	XM-2 (XM Rock)		Geostationary transfer	XM Satellite Radio	Success
40	Communication; Commercial launch conducted by Sea Launch							
41	8 May 2001; 22:10	Zenit-3SL	Ocean Odyssey	XM-1 (XM Roll)		Geostationary transfer	XM Satellite Radio	Success
41	Communication; Commercial launch conducted by Sea Launch							
42	10 December 2001; 17:18	Zenit-2	Baikonur 45/1	Meteor-3M No.1; Kompass 1 Badr B MAROC-TUBSAT; REFLECTOR		Low Earth (SSO)	Roscosmos; IZMIRAN; SUPARCO AFRL	Success
42	Meteorology; Earth Sciences; Technology; Laser Calibration							
43	15 June 2002; 22:39	Zenit-3SL	Ocean Odyssey	Galaxy 3C		Geostationary transfer	PanAmSat	Success
43	Communication; Commercial launch conducted by Sea Launch							
44	10 June 2003; 13:56	Zenit-3SL	Ocean Odyssey	Thuraya 2		Geostationary transfer	Thuraya	Success
44	Communication; Commercial launch conducted by Sea Launch							
45	8 August 2003; 03:30	Zenit-3SL	Ocean Odyssey	EchoStar IX		Geostationary transfer	EchoStar	Success
45	Communication; Commercial launch conducted by Sea Launch							
46	1 October 2003; 04:03	Zenit-3SL	Ocean Odyssey	Galaxy 13/Horizons 1		Geostationary transfer	PanAmSat	Success
46	Communication; Commercial launch conducted by Sea Launch							
47	11 January 2004; 04:13	Zenit-3SL	Ocean Odyssey	Telstar 14		Geostationary transfer	Telesat	Success
47	Communication; Commercial launch conducted by Sea Launch							
48	4 May 2004; 12:42	Zenit-3SL	Ocean Odyssey	DirecTV-7S		Geostationary transfer	DirecTV	Success
48	Communication; Commercial launch conducted by Sea Launch							
49	10 June 2004; 01:28	Zenit-2	Baikonur 45/1	Kosmos 2406 (Tselina-2)		Low Earth		Success
49	ELINT							
50	29 June 2004; 03:59	Zenit-3SL	Ocean Odyssey	APSTAR-V/Telstar 18		Geostationary transfer	APT/Telesat	Partial failure
50	Communication; Commercial launch conducted by Sea Launch. Block-DM upper stage shutdown 54 seconds early due to electrical short circuit that disrupted data from fuel sensors. Satellite able to transfer to operational orbit by itself.							
=== 2005–2009 ===
Flight No.	Date / time (UTC)	Rocket, Configuration	Launch site	Payload	Payload mass	Orbit	Customer	Launch outcome
51	1 March 2005; 03:51	Zenit-3SL	Ocean Odyssey	XM-3 (XM Rhythm)		Geostationary transfer	XM Satellite Radio	Success
51	Communication; Commercial launch conducted by Sea Launch							
52	26 April 2005; 07:31	Zenit-3SL	Ocean Odyssey	Spaceway 1		Geostationary transfer	DirecTV	Success
52	Communication; Commercial launch conducted by Sea Launch							
53	23 June 2005; 14:03	Zenit-3SL	Ocean Odyssey	Intelsat Americas 8		Geostationary transfer	Intelsat	Success
53	Communication; Commercial launch conducted by Sea Launch							
54	8 November 2005; 14:07	Zenit-3SL	Ocean Odyssey	Inmarsat-4 F2		Geostationary transfer	Inmarsat	Success
54	Communication; Commercial launch conducted by Sea Launch							
55	15 February 2006; 23:34	Zenit-3SL	Ocean Odyssey	EchoStar X		Geostationary transfer	EchoStar	Success
55	Communication; Commercial launch conducted by Sea Launch							
56	12 April 2006; 23:30	Zenit-3SL	Ocean Odyssey	JCSat 9		Geostationary transfer	JSAT Corporation	Success
56	Communication; Commercial launch conducted by Sea Launch							
57	18 June 2006; 07:50	Zenit-3SL	Ocean Odyssey	Galaxy 16		Geostationary transfer	PanAmSat	Success
57	Communication; Commercial launch conducted by Sea Launch							
58	22 August 2006; 03:27	Zenit-3SL	Ocean Odyssey	Koreasat 5		Geostationary transfer	KT Corporation	Success
58	Communication; Commercial launch conducted by Sea Launch							
59	30 October 2006; 23:49	Zenit-3SL	Ocean Odyssey	XM-4 (XM Blues)		Geostationary transfer	XM Satellite Radio	Success
59	Communication; Commercial launch conducted by Sea Launch							
60	30 January 2007; 23:22	Zenit-3SL	Ocean Odyssey	NSS-8		Geostationary transfer (intended)	SES New Skies	Failure
60	Communication; Commercial launch conducted by Sea Launch. First stage engine failure at T+3.9 seconds due to foreign object in turbopump; rocket fell back through the pad and exploded. Launch platform suffers moderate damage and the flame deflector was destroyed.							
61	29 June 2007; 10:00	Zenit-2M	Baikonur 45/1	Kosmos 2428 (Tselina-2)		Low Earth		Success
61	ELINT; First Zenit-2M launch.							
62	15 January 2008; 11:49	Zenit-3SL	Ocean Odyssey	Thuraya 3		Geostationary transfer	Thuraya	Success
62	Communication; Commercial launch conducted by Sea Launch							
63	19 March 2008; 22:48	Zenit-3SL	Ocean Odyssey	DirecTV-11		Geostationary transfer	DirecTV	Success
63	Communication; Commercial launch conducted by Sea Launch							
64	28 April 2008; 05:00	Zenit-3SLB	Baikonur 45/1	Amos-3		Geostationary	Spacecom	Success
64	Communication; First Zenit-3SLB launch and first commercial launch for Land Launch. Spacecraft separation orbit reported to be slightly off target but still within planned range.							
65	21 May 2008; 09:44	Zenit-3SL	Ocean Odyssey	Galaxy 18		Geostationary transfer	Intelsat	Success
65	Communication; Commercial launch conducted by Sea Launch							
66	16 July 2008; 05:21	Zenit-3SL	Ocean Odyssey	EchoStar XI		Geostationary transfer	EchoStar	Success
66	Communication; Commercial launch conducted by Sea Launch							
67	24 September 2008; 09:28	Zenit-3SL	Ocean Odyssey	Galaxy 19		Geostationary transfer	Intelsat	Success
67	Communication; Commercial launch conducted by Sea Launch							
68	26 February 2009; 18:29	Zenit-3SLB	Baikonur 45/1	Telstar 11N		Geostationary transfer	Telesat	Success
68	Communication; Commercial launch conducted by Land Launch							
69	20 April 2009; 08:16	Zenit-3SL	Ocean Odyssey	SICRAL 1B		Geostationary transfer	MDD	Success
69	Communications; Commercial launch conducted by Sea Launch							
70	21 June 2009; 21:50	Zenit-3SLB	Baikonur 45/1	MEASAT-3a		Geostationary transfer	MEASAT	Success
70	Communication; Commercial launch conducted by Land Launch							
71	30 November 2009; 21:00	Zenit-3SLB	Baikonur 45/1	Intelsat 15		Geostationary transfer	Intelsat	Success
71	Communication; Commercial launch conducted by Land Launch							
=== 2010–2014 ===
Flight No.	Date / time (UTC)	Rocket, Configuration	Launch site	Payload	Payload mass	Orbit	Customer	Launch outcome
72	20 January 2011; 12:29	Zenit-3F	Baikonur 45/1	Elektro-L No.1		Geostationary	Roscosmos	Success
72	Meteorology; Maiden flight of the Zenit-3F							
73	18 July 2011; 02:31	Zenit-3F	Baikonur 45/1	Spektr-R		High Earth	Roscosmos	Success
73	Radio astronomy							
74	24 September 2011; 20:18	Zenit-3SL	Ocean Odyssey	Atlantic Bird 7		Geostationary transfer	Eutelsat	Success
74	Communication; Commercial launch conducted by Sea Launch (first mission since company reorganization)							
75	5 October 2011; 21:00	Zenit-3SLB	Baikonur 45/1	Intelsat 18		Geostationary transfer	Intelsat	Success
75	Communication; Commercial launch conducted by Land Launch							
76	8 November 2011; 20:16	Zenit-2M (Zenit-2FG)	Baikonur 45/1	Fobos-Grunt		Low Earth	Roscosmos	Success
76	Phobos lander/sample return; Spacecraft failed shortly after launch before leaving Low Earth orbit. Spacecraft also carried the Yinghuo 1 Mars orbiter.							
77	1 June 2012; 05:23	Zenit-3SL	Ocean Odyssey	Intelsat 19		Geostationary transfer	Intelsat	Success
77	Communication; Commercial launch conducted by Sea Launch							
78	19 August 2012; 06:55	Zenit-3SL	Ocean Odyssey	Intelsat 21		Geostationary transfer	Intelsat	Success
78	Communication; Commercial launch conducted by Sea Launch							
79	3 December 2012; 20:44	Zenit-3SL	Ocean Odyssey	Eutelsat 70B		Geostationary transfer	Eutelsat	Success
79	Communication; Commercial launch conducted by Sea Launch							
80	1 February 2013; 06:56	Zenit-3SL	Ocean Odyssey	Intelsat 27		Geostationary transfer (intended)	Intelsat	Failure
80	Communication; Commercial launch conducted by Sea Launch. Rocket lost attitude control at T+4.5 seconds due to first stage engine steering hydraulic pump failure; engine cut-off at T+20 seconds and rocket impacted ocean at T+56 seconds.							
81	31 August 2013; 20:05	Zenit-3SLB	Baikonur 45/1	Amos-4		Geostationary transfer	Spacecom	Success
81	Communication; Commercial launch conducted by Land Launch							
82	26 May 2014; 21:10	Zenit-3SL	Ocean Odyssey	Eutelsat 3B		Geostationary transfer	Eutelsat	Success
82	Communication; Commercial launch conducted by Sea Launch							
=== 2015–2019 ===
Flight No.	Date / time (UTC)	Rocket, Configuration	Launch site	Payload	Payload mass	Orbit	Customer	Launch outcome
83	11 December 2015; 13:45	Zenit-3F	Baikonur 45/1	Elektro-L No.2		Geostationary	Roscosmos	Success
83	Meteorology							
84	26 December 2017; 19:00	Zenit-3F	Baikonur 45/1	AngoSat 1		Geostationary	Angosat	Success
84	Communication; First satellite of Angola							
