= AMOS-8 (satellite) =

AMOS communications satellite

- Names: Affordable Modular Optimized Satellite-8
- Mission type: Communications
- Operator: Spacecom Satellite Communications
- Mission duration: 16 years (planned)

Spacecraft properties
- Bus: SSL 1300
- Manufacturer: Maxar Technologies
- Launch mass: 5,250 kg (11,570 lb)

Start of mission
- Launch date: 2021 (planned) - cancelled

Orbital parameters
- Reference system: Geocentric orbit (planned)
- Regime: Geostationary orbit
- Longitude: 4° West

Transponders
- Band: 65 transponders: 39 Ku-band; 24 Ka-band; 2 S-band
- Coverage area: Israel, Europe, Africa, Asia, Middle East

AMOS-8 was a planned Israeli communications satellite, one of the Spacecom AMOS series, to be built by Maxar Technologies, a US defense and aerospace company, to replace AMOS-3 and AMOS-7

== Terminology ==
AMOS stands for "Affordable Modular Optimized Satellite" and is also an allusion to the prophet Amos.

== History ==
AMOS-8 was to include flexible high power Ku-band, Ka-band, and S-band payloads with steerable antennas to enable customers to deliver various added value services. Spacecom had originally selected in March 2018 SSL to build the satellite, for US$112 million, but in September 2018 it was announced, that the satellite would not be built by SSL,. Eventually the project was cancelled by Spacecom Satellite Communications.

The Government of Israel decided to order a satellite named "Dror-1", this satellite will be built by the state-owned Israel Aerospace Industries (IAI) to preserve the satellite building capability, although at a much higher price.

== See also ==
- List of Falcon 9 launches
