= AMOS (satellite) =

Series of Israeli communications satellites

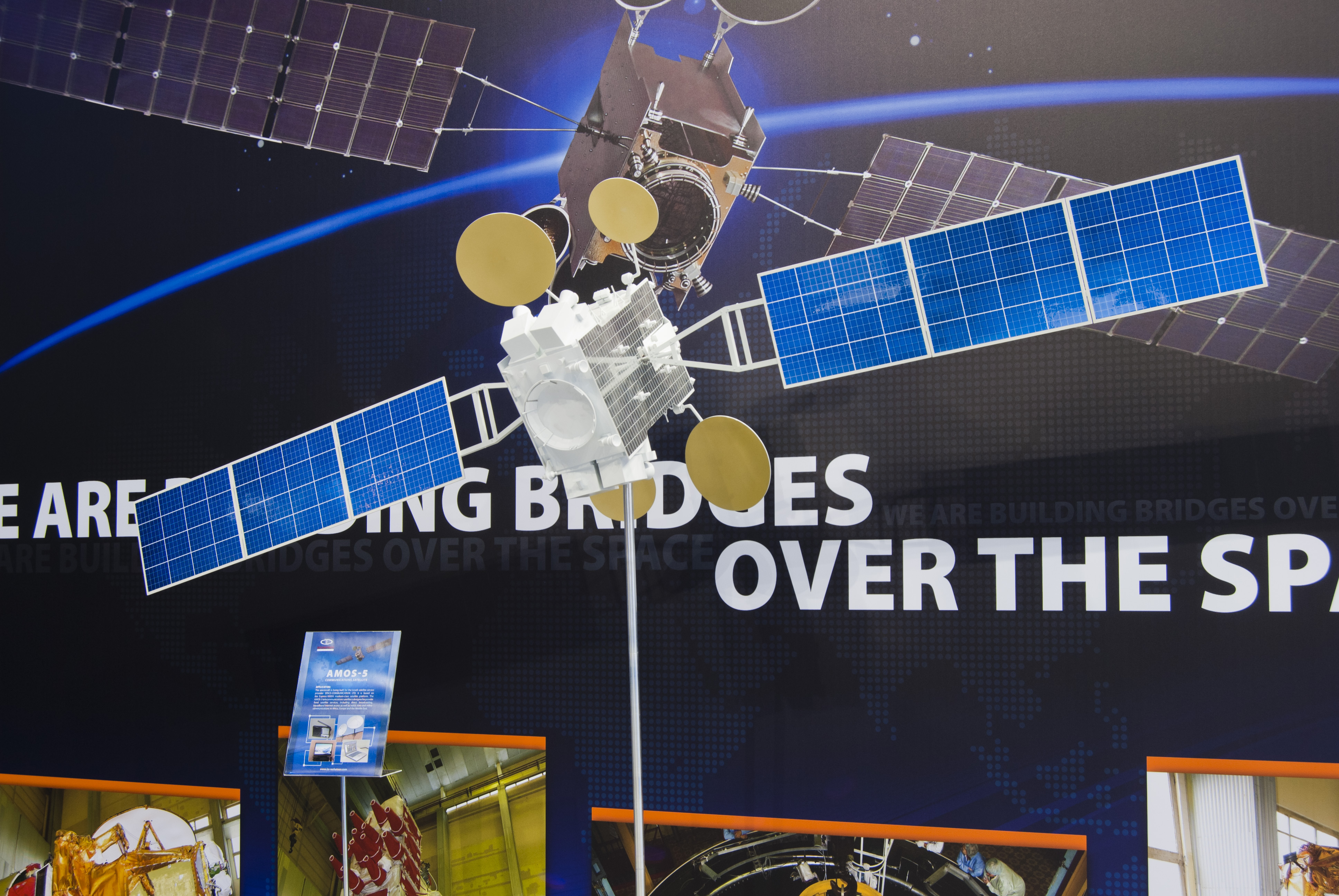
- Model of Israeli AMOS-5 satellite during "Semana de Espacio", in IFEMA, Madrid.
- Manufacturer: Israel Aerospace Industries, ISS Reshetnev (AMOS-5)
- Country of origin: Israel
- Operator: Spacecom
- Applications: Communications

Specifications
- Bus: AMOS bus Ekspress bus (AMOS-5); Boeing 702 bus (AMOS-17)
- Regime: Geostationary

Production
- Status: Active
- Built: 7 known
- Launched: 5
- Operational: 3
- Failed: 1
- Lost: 1
- Maiden launch: AMOS-1 - 16 May 1996
- Last launch: AMOS-17 - 6 August 2019

AMOS ("Affordable Modular Optimized Satellite") is a series of Israeli communications satellites operated by Israel-based Spacecom. All AMOS satellites were developed by Israel Aerospace Industries (IAI) using the AMOS bus satellite bus, except for AMOS-5 which was developed by ISS Reshetnev using the Ekspress bus satellite bus, and AMOS-17 which was developed by Boeing on its BSS-702.

== Function ==
The six AMOS satellites used five different launch vehicles: Soyuz, Zenit, Proton, Ariane and Falcon 9; and three different launch sites: Baikonur Cosmodrome in Kazakhstan, Centre Spatial Guyanais in French Guiana, and Cape Canaveral in Florida.

The constellation serves a variety of purposes, including direct-to-home broadcasting, broadband internet access, and communication services for governments and businesses. The satellites are strategically positioned to provide coverage to Europe, the Middle East, Africa, and Asia. The AMOS satellites are built to withstand harsh space environments and have an average lifespan of around 15 years.

== Other uses ==
In addition to its commercial services, the AMOS satellite constellation has also been used for scientific research and military purposes. For example, the AMOS-2 satellite was used to study the effects of space weather on communications systems, while the AMOS-3 satellite has been used to provide secure communication services to the Israeli military.

In addition, it has also been used for military and intelligence operations. The AMOS constellation has also been used for disaster relief efforts, providing emergency communication capabilities in areas affected by natural disasters.

== Awards ==
The AMOS satellite constellation has received recognition for its contributions to the satellite communication industry, receiving awards such as the “Satellite Executive of the Year Award” in 2014.

== AMOS-6 failure ==
The AMOS-6 satellite was built by Israel Aerospace Industries (IAI) and contracted to Spacecom, a leading provider of satellite communication services in Israel. The satellite was intended to be launched on a SpaceX Falcon 9 rocket and operate in the geostationary orbit for at least 15 years. It was equipped with advanced technologies, including high-throughput Ka-band and Ku-band transponders, steerable spot beams, and electric propulsion, among others. The satellite was also leased by Facebook, which planned to use it to expand its internet access initiatives in Africa under the name of "Internet.org."

On September 1, 2016, at around 9:00 AM local time, the Falcon 9 rocket carrying the AMOS-6 satellite exploded on the launchpad during a static fire test. The explosion caused extensive damage to the launchpad and surrounding infrastructure, as well as the loss of the payload. The incident was captured on camera and widely circulated on social media, sparking concerns about the safety of space launches and the reliability of private space companies. Following the incident, SpaceX launched an investigation into the cause of the failure and suspended all its launch operations for several months. Spacecom, on the other hand, suffered a significant financial loss due to the destruction of the satellite, which was estimated to be worth around $200 million.

The incident raised questions about the reliability and safety of commercial space launches and the need for more rigorous testing and oversight. It also highlighted the importance of satellite communication for global connectivity and economic development, especially in underserved regions. Since the failure of Amos-6, as of mid-October 2023, SpaceX has completed 235 consecutive successful orbital missions.

== Satellites ==
1. AMOS-1 was the first Israeli communications satellite. Its development was based on experience from Ofeq reconnaissance satellites in association with DASA and Alcatel. It was launched on 16 May 1996, from Centre Spatial Guyanais (European Space Centre) in French Guiana. It was in use for home television services (DTH/DBS by the Yes company in Israel and by HBO and others in Europe). Space Communications LTD (Spacecom) quickly succeeded in filling all transmission capacity of AMOS-1 and accumulated additional requests. Therefore, it decided to broaden its activity and initiated AMOS-2 creation which is operational today (see below). In 2009, AMOS-1 was sold to Intelsat, and became Intelsat 24.
2. AMOS-2 was launched on 28 December 2003, from Baikonur Cosmodrome, in Kazakhstan and it serves clients in three service regions: Middle East (including Israel), Europe and the East Coast of the United States. Transmission and communication services provided by this satellite include: direct distribution of television and radio translations; television and radio translations to communication centers; distribution of internet services, data transmissions to communication networks. AMOS-1 and AMOS-2 were placed in proximity to create a common location, which enables satellite users to increase user abilities without additional antennas. After AMOS-3 replaced AMOS-1, AMOS-2 and AMOS-3 are placed in proximity.
3. AMOS-3 was launched on 28 April 2008. It achieved the planned orbit successfully. The US$170 million satellite is designed to offer increased capacity, expanded coverage and improved links between the Middle East and Europe and the Eastern United States. It is to remain in space 18 years. AMOS-3 replaced the AMOS-1 satellite. The satellite is located at 4° West on the equator, the same as AMOS-2 satellite.
1. AMOS-4 is a larger platform (3500 kg) than previous Amos generations and was launched on 31 August 2013, from Baikonur Cosmodrome, Kazakhstan. It is placed in geostationary orbit at 65° East longitude. It offers coverage across Southeast Asia along with high power coverage beams offering communication links from East Asia to the Middle East.
2. AMOS-5 was launched on 11 December 2011 and provided coverage over the continent of Africa, as well as Europe and the Middle East. The satellite was located at 17° East longitude. Unlike previous AMOS satellites, it was developed by the Russian company Reshetnev rather than IAI. Contact with the satellite was lost on 21 November 2015.
3. AMOS-6 was expected to be launched by mid-2016 to replace AMOS-2. The 5500 kg satellite was built by Israel Aerospace Industries. It was destroyed on the pad on 1 September 2016, by an explosion at Cape Canaveral Air Force Station SLC-40.
4. AMOS-7 (AsiaSat 8) was launched on 5 August 2014 by SpaceX.
5. AMOS-8 was commissioned by the Government of Israel in September 2018.
6. AMOS-17 launched on 6 August 2019, and is a Boeing type BSS 702MP satellite transmitting in the Ka-, Ku-, and C-bands. It is a replacement for AMOS-5 and provides coverage over the continent of Africa, as well as Europe and the Middle East. The satellite is located at 17° East longitude.
