= AMOS-3 (satellite) =

AMOS communications satellite

AMOS-3 / AMOS-60
- Names: Affordable Modular Optimized Satellite-3; AMOS-60
- Mission type: Communications
- Operator: Spacecom Satellite Communications
- COSPAR ID: 2008-022A
- SATCAT no.: 32794
- Website: https://www.amos-spacecom.com/
- Mission duration: 18 years (planned); 18 years, 6 months and 14 days (in progress)

Spacecraft properties
- Spacecraft: AMOS-3
- Spacecraft type: AMOS
- Bus: AMOS Bus
- Manufacturer: Israel Aerospace Industries (bus); Thales Alenia Space (payload)
- Launch mass: 1,263 kg (2,784 lb)
- Dry mass: 837 kg (1,845 lb)
- Power: 1700 watts

Start of mission
- Launch date: 28 April 2008, 05:00:00 UTC
- Rocket: Zenit-3SLB (# 1)
- Launch site: Baikonur, Site 45/1
- Contractor: Yuzhmash
- Entered service: June 2008

Orbital parameters
- Reference system: Geocentric orbit
- Regime: Geostationary orbit
- Longitude: 4° West until march 2026, 78° East from August 2026

Transponders
- Band: 14 transponders: 12 Ku-band; 2 Ka-band
- Coverage area: Eastern United States, Europe, Africa, Israel, Middle East

AMOS-3, also known as AMOS-60, is an Israeli communications satellite operated by Spacecom Satellite Communications.

== History ==
Spacecom Satellite Communications has signed an agreement in September 2005 with Israel Aerospace Industries (IAI) to buy its third satellite, AMOS-3, from the Israeli defense contractor.

== Satellite description ==
The satellite is powered by twin solar panels, and is based on the Israeli AMOS Bus. It replaced AMOS-1 in geosynchronous orbit at 4° West. AMOS-3 carries fourteen Ku-band / Ka-band transponders, and is expected to have an on-orbit lifetime of 18 years. By March 2026 the satellite was still at 4 degrees west but was spotted in inclined orbit and had reached the end of its lifespan. Most services operating through it have already been transferred to a newer satellite at the same orbital position.

In mid April 2026 Amos has started moving across the GEO belt and has reached its new location, at 78E, in late August 2026.

== Launch ==
It was launched atop the maiden flight of the Zenit-3SLB launch vehicle, the first launch contracted by the Land Launch organisation. The launch was originally scheduled to occur in 2007, and later March 2008, however, this was delayed until 24 April 2008. The launch attempt on 24 April 2008 was scrubbed for "technical reasons". This was later determined to be a problem with the erector/transporter system, which had failed to retract and move away from the launch vehicle. AMOS-3 lifted-off from Site 45/1 at the Baikonur Cosmodrome at 05:00:00 UTC on 28 April 2008.

== See also ==
- Amos-2
- Amos-4
