= Space Communication =

Space communication may refer to:

- Communication between spacecraft
- Spacecom, an Israeli company
