= Lilac Sigan =

Israeli journalist and writer (born 1963)

- לילך סיגן
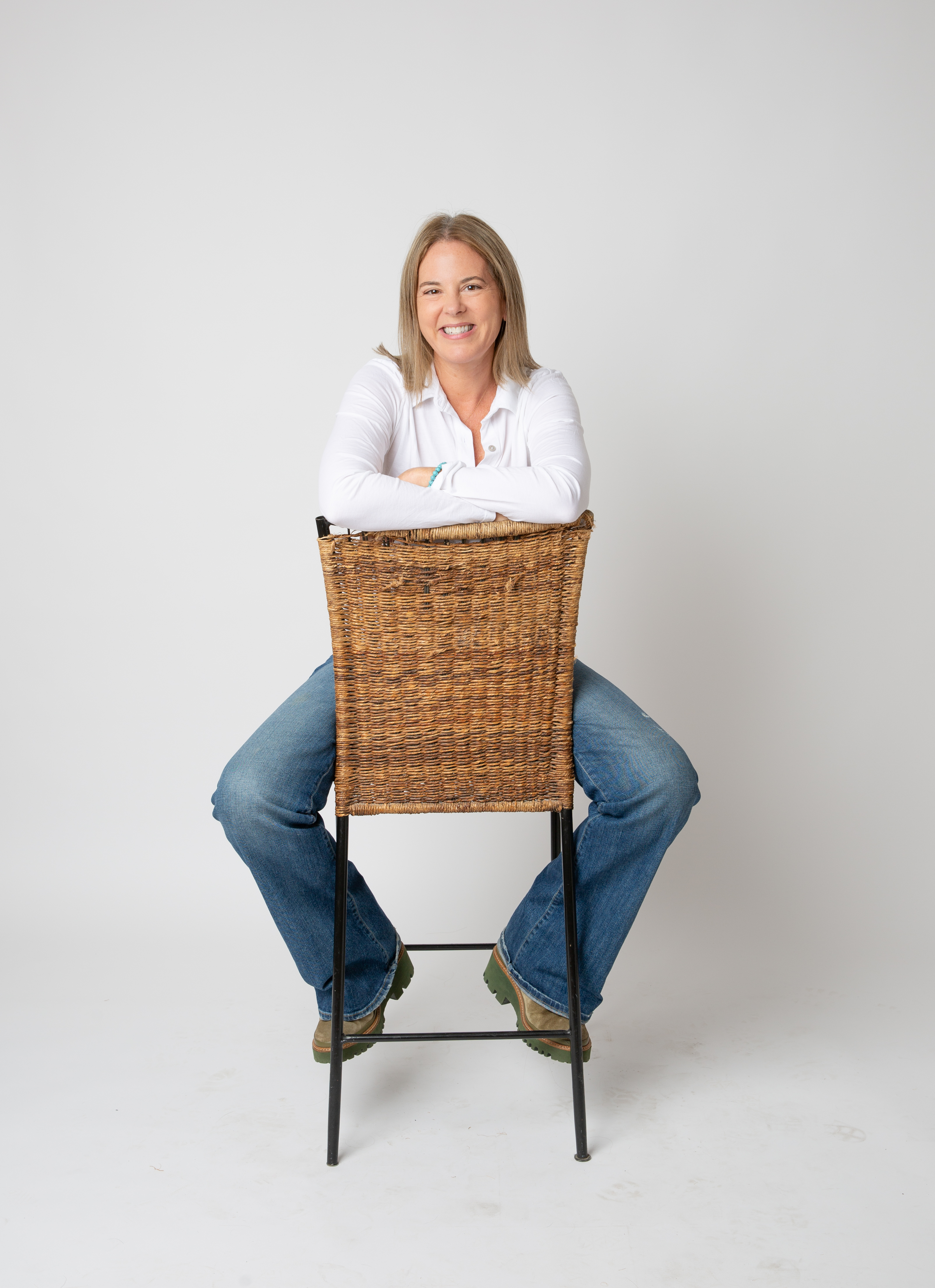
- Born: November 29, 1963 (age 62); Jerusalem
- Education: Tel Aviv University, The Hebrew University
- Occupations: Writer, journalist, public speaker
- Writing career
- Notable awards: Golden Book Award 2018 from the Israel Book Publishers Association

Lilac Sigan (Hebrew: לילך סיגן; born November 29, 1963) is an Israeli writer, journalist, and public speaker.

== Biography ==
Lilac Sigan was born in Jerusalem in 1963 to Simha Sigan, a Jewish Agency envoy and marketing consultant, and Dalia Sigan, an editor in "Kol Yisrael" radio and VP in The Second Authority for Television and Radio. She grew up in the United States and spent most of her adult years in Israel.

She received a bachelor's degree in economics from Hebrew University, and a master's degree in business and marketing from Tel Aviv University. She worked as an account manager in Arieli advertising in the 1980s and was part of the L'oreal marketing department in Paris in the 1990s. She began her writing career in 1996 as a correspondent in the business section of Haaretz. In 2002, she joined Globes as editor and writer in the fields of marketing and communications.

Before leaving Globes in 2011, she was the chief editor of the daily magazine section as well as "Firma" magazine and a yearly branding magazine. She was the content manager and host of annual Globes business conference and annual marketing convention and hosted programs such as "The campaign" and "The Economic Arena" in Israel's Educational Channel, and "Money Talks" on Israel's Channel 10.

Many of her articles were translated and aired on the English website of Globes. Most of them promoted pro-Israeli stances at a time when Israel was extremely criticized by international media.

In 2015, Sigan started contributing op-ed to the HuffPost and The Jerusalem Post, and contributed some reader opinions to The New York Times, expressing similar views about anti-Israeli stands and their correlation with antisemitism.

She also serves as a member of the board of "Far Beyond", an NGO established by Keshet (Israel's channel 12).

Today she writes a weekly column for Maariv about politics and social issues, and is a commentator on several Israeli television and radio shows.

In 2022 she performed a study that monitored the coverage of Israel in the New York Times. The results were published in Ma’ariv and other media outlets, and became an academic study for Bar Ilan University.

She is married to Ligad Rotlevy (owner of Ratio and Spacecom) and has two children.

== Books ==
- Kapiyot (Spoons) – Yedioth Books 2017
- Roman le-Mathilim (Story for Beginners) – Yedioth Books 2011
- Ga’aguim le-Max (Missing Max) – Yedioth Books 2003
- Ha-elim ha-Chadashim (The New Gods) – Yedioth Books 2001
