= Land Launch =

Satellite launching service

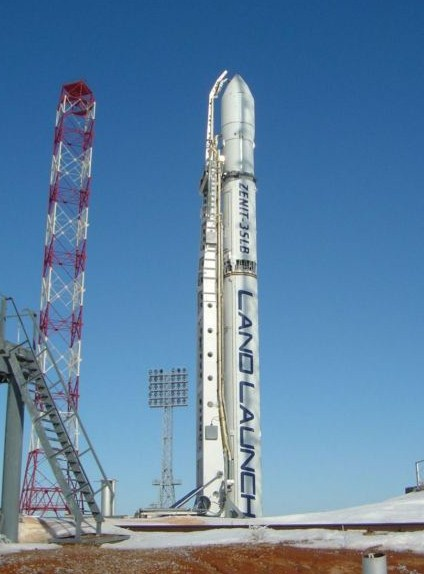
Zenit-3SL as a part of Land Launch program

Land Launch refers to a service product of Sea Launch SA. There is no entity or company called Land Launch. Sea Launch created the Land Launch offering to address lighter satellites directly into geosynchronous orbit or into geosynchronous transfer orbit, while Sea Launch continues to address the heavy satellite launch market.

In 2002, Sea Launch created Land Launch with its Russian and Ukrainian partners. The Russian and Ukrainian partners formed a Russian company Space International Services (SIS) to provide the launch services and launch operations. While the Sea Launch company maintains the rights to market Land Launch to the commercial community, the new entity SIS can market launch services to government customers.

Land Launch uses Zenit rockets to conduct commercial satellite launches from the Baikonur Cosmodrome Site 45/1 in Kazakhstan. Land Launch missions differ from Sea Launch missions in that the Zenit-3SLB is used, as opposed to the Zenit-3SL. The Zenit-3SLB utilizes substantially the same components as the Zenit-3SL but a smaller payload fairing is used to accommodate the smaller satellites launched from its northern operating location.

The first launch was conducted on 28 April 2008 at 05:00 GMT, when a Zenit-3SLB was used to place AMOS-3 (AMOS-60) a communications satellite, into a geosynchronous orbit.

A second launch was completed on February 26, 2009, when Land Launch successfully launched the Telstar 11N mission.

A commercial version of the two-stage Zenit-2M, the Zenit-2SLB, is also offered for commercial launches utilizing Land Launch. However, no launches have been contracted for this smaller rocket.

== Launches ==
Number	Date	Type	Serial No.	Launch site	Payload	Payload Type	Orbit	Outcome	Remarks
1	28 April 2008	Zenit-3SLB		Baikonur Cosmodrome, Site 45	AMOS-3	Commercial communications satellite	Geostationary orbit	Success	First Land Launch flight
2	2009-02-26	Zenit 3SLB		Baikonur Cosmodrome Site 45	Telstar 11N	Commercial communications satellite	GTO	Success	
3	2009-06-22	Zenit 3SLB		Baikonur Cosmodrome Site 45	MEASAT-3a	Commercial communications satellite	GTO	Success	
4	2009-11-30	Zenit 3SLB		Baikonur Cosmodrome Site 45	Intelsat 15	Commercial communications satellite	GTO	Success	
5	2011-10-05	Zenit 3SLB		Baikonur Cosmodrome Site 45	Intelsat 18	Commercial communications satellite	GTO	Success	
6	2013-09-31	Zenit 3SLB		Baikonur Cosmodrome Site 45	AMOS-4	Commercial communications satellite	GTO	Success	

== See also ==
- Expendable launch system
- Sea Launch
