= Falcon 9 Full Thrust =

Third version of the SpaceX medium-lift launch vehicle

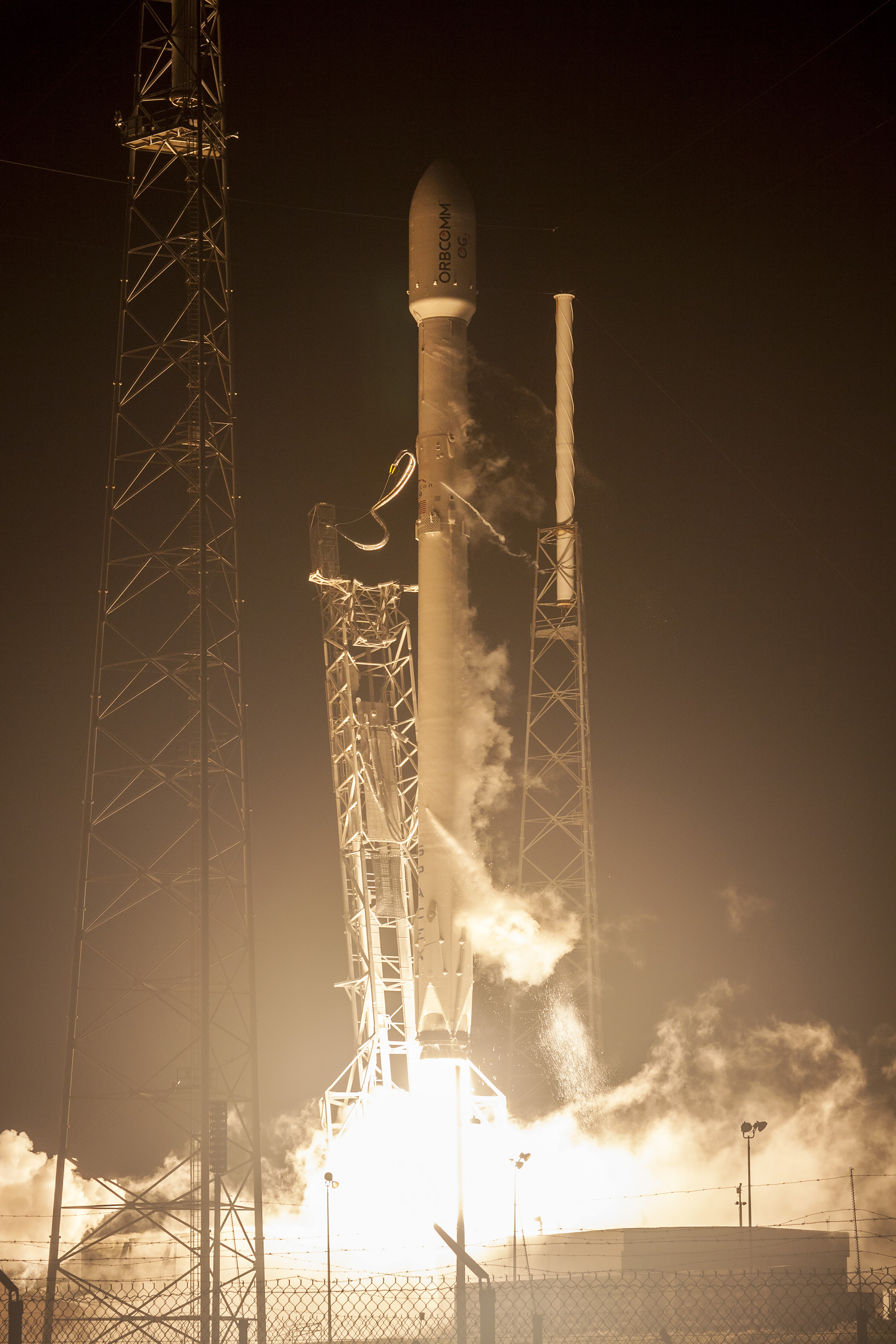
- Falcon 9 Flight 20, the first flight of the Full Thrust, which successfully deployed 11 Orbcomm satellites and achieved the first-ever vertical landing of an orbital rocket's first stage
- Function: Medium-lift launch vehicle
- Manufacturer: SpaceX
- Country of origin: United States
- Cost per launch: Expended: US$62 million; Reusable: US$50 million

Size
- Height: 69.8 m (229 ft) with payload fairing 65.7 m (216 ft) with Crew Dragon 63.7 m (209 ft) with Dragon
- Diameter: 3.7 m (12 ft)
- Mass: 549,000 kg (1,210,000 lb)
- Stages: 2

Capacity

Payload to LEO
- Orbital inclination: 28.5°
- Mass: Expended: 22,800 kg (50,300 lb); Reusable: 18,500 kg (40,800 lb)

Payload to GTO
- Orbital inclination: 27°
- Mass: Expended: 8,300 kg (18,300 lb); Reusable: 7,000 kg (15,000 lb)

Payload to TMI
- Mass: 4,020 kg (8,860 lb)

Associated rockets
- Family: Falcon 9
- Based on: Falcon 9 v1.1
- Derivative work: Falcon 9 Block 5 Falcon Heavy
- Comparable: Ariane 5; Atlas V; H-IIB; Long March 3B/E; Proton-M

Launch history
- Status: Active
- Launch sites: Cape Canaveral, SLC-40; Kennedy, LC-39A; Vandenberg, SLC-4
- Total launches: 674
- Success(es): 673
- Failure: 1
- Notable outcome: 1 (AMOS-6 pre-flight destruction)
- Landings: 652 / 660 attempts
- First flight: 22 December 2015 (Orbcomm-OG2-2)
- Last flight: Active
- Carries passengers or cargo: Dragon; Boeing X-37; Iridium NEXT; TESS; Zuma; Starlink

First stage
- Height: 41.2 m (135 ft)
- Diameter: 3.7 m (12 ft)
- Powered by: 9 × Merlin 1D
- Maximum thrust: SL: 7,607 kN (1,710,000 lb_{f}); vac: 8,227 kN (1,850,000 lb_{f})
- Specific impulse: SL: 282 s (2.77 km/s); vac: 311 s (3.05 km/s)
- Burn time: 162 seconds
- Propellant: LOX / RP-1

Second stage
- Height: 13.8 m (45 ft)
- Diameter: 3.7 m (12 ft)
- Powered by: 1 × Merlin 1D Vacuum
- Maximum thrust: 934 kN (210,000 lb_{f})
- Specific impulse: 348 s (3.41 km/s)
- Burn time: 397 seconds
- Propellant: LOX / RP-1

Falcon 9 Full Thrust (also known as Falcon 9 v1.2) is a partially reusable, two-stage-to-orbit, medium-lift launch vehicle (Note: If launched in expendable configuration, Falcon 9 has a theoretical payload capability of a heavy-lift launch vehicle) designed and manufactured in the United States by SpaceX. It is the third major version of the Falcon 9 family, designed starting in 2014, with its first launch operations in December 2015. It was later refined into the Block 4 and Block 5. As of October 13, 2026, all variants of the Falcon 9 Full Thrust (including Block 4 and 5) had performed 674 launches with only one failure: Starlink Group 9-3.

On 22 December 2015, the Full Thrust version of the Falcon 9 family was the first launch vehicle on an orbital trajectory to successfully vertically land a first stage. The landing followed a technology development program conducted from 2013 to 2015. Some of the required technology advances, such as landing legs, were pioneered on the Falcon 9 v1.1 version, but that version never landed intact. Starting in 2017, previously flown first-stage boosters were reused to launch new payloads into orbit. This quickly became routine, in 2018 and in 2019 more than half of all Falcon 9 flights reused a booster. In 2020 the fraction of reused boosters increased to 81%.

Falcon 9 Full Thrust is a substantial upgrade over the previous Falcon 9 v1.1 rocket, which flew its last mission in January 2016. With uprated first- and second-stage engines, a larger second-stage propellant tank, and propellant densification, the vehicle can carry substantial payloads to geostationary orbit and perform a propulsive landing for recovery.

== Design ==
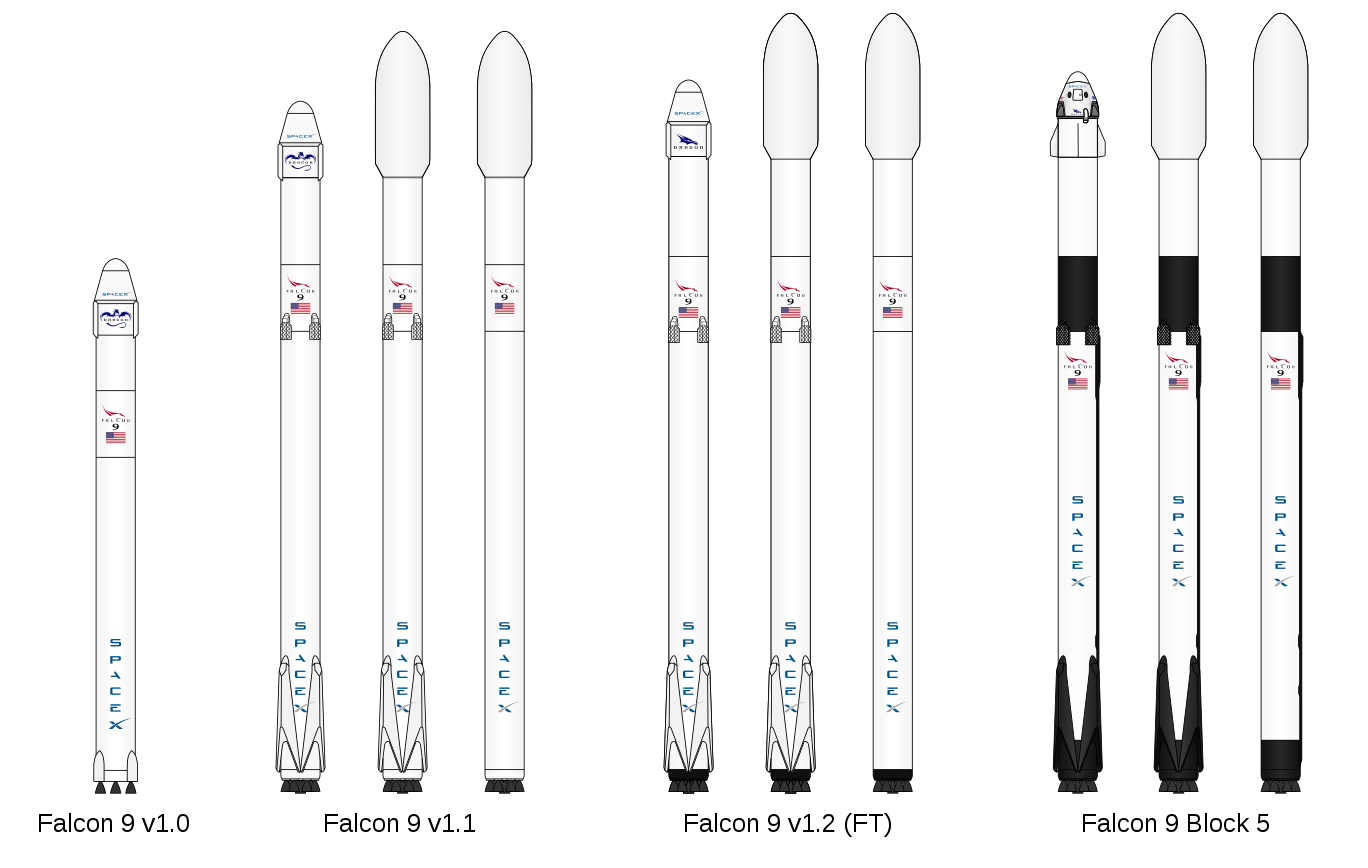
From left to right, Falcon 9 v1.0, configurations of Falcon 9 v1.1, configurations of Falcon 9 v1.2 (Full Thrust) and configurations of Falcon 9 Block 5

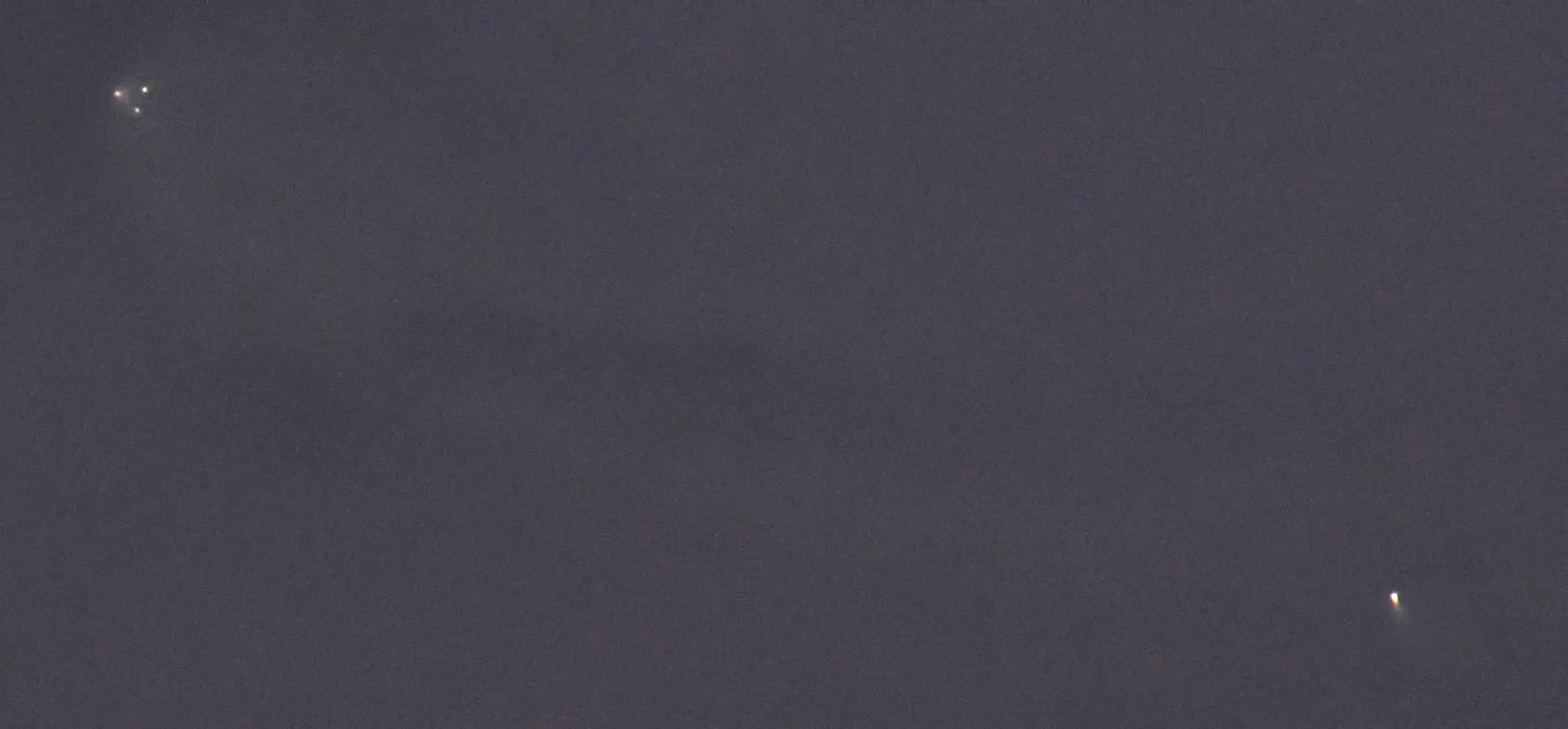
Falcon 9 Full Thrust launch on 4 March 2016. The discarded first stage is in the lower right. The second stage is in the upper left, with the two parts of the jettisoned payload fairing.

A principal objective of the new design was to facilitate booster re-usability for a larger range of missions, including delivery of large commsats to geosynchronous orbit.

Like earlier versions of the Falcon 9, and like the Saturn series from the Apollo program, the presence of multiple first-stage engines can allow for mission completion even if one of the first-stage engines fails mid-flight.

=== Modifications from Falcon 9 v1.1 ===
The third version of the Falcon 9 was developed in 2014–2015 and made its maiden flight in December 2015. The Falcon 9 Full Thrust is a modified reusable variant of the Falcon 9 family with capabilities that exceed the Falcon 9 v1.1, including the ability to "land the first stage for geostationary transfer orbit (GTO) missions on the drone ship" The rocket was designed using systems and software technology that had been developed as part of the SpaceX reusable launch system development program, a private initiative by SpaceX to facilitate rapid reusability of both the first–and in the long term, second—stages of SpaceX launch vehicles. Various technologies were tested on the Grasshopper technology demonstrator, as well as several flights of the Falcon 9 v1.1 on which post-mission booster controlled-descent tests were being conducted.

In 2015, SpaceX made a number of modifications to the existing Falcon 9 v1.1. The new rocket was known internally as Falcon 9 Full Thrust, and is also known as Falcon 9 v1.2, Enhanced Falcon 9, Full-Performance Falcon 9, and Falcon 9 Upgrade.

A principal objective of the new design was to facilitate booster reusability for a larger range of missions, including delivery of large commsats to geosynchronous orbit.

Modifications in the upgraded version include:

- liquid oxygen subcooled to 66.5 K (−206.7 °C; 119.7 °R; −340.0 °F) and RP-1 cooled to 266.5 K (−6.6 °C; 479.7 °R; 20.0 °F) for density (allowing more fuel and oxidizer to be stored in a given tank volume, as well as increasing the propellant mass flow through the turbopumps increasing thrust)
- upgraded structure in the first stage
- longer second stage propellant tanks
- longer and stronger interstage, housing the second stage engine nozzle, grid fins, and attitude thrusters
- center pusher added for stage separation
- design evolution of the grid fins
- modified Octaweb
- upgraded landing legs
- Merlin 1D engine thrust increased to the full-thrust variant of the Merlin 1D, taking advantage of the denser propellants achieved by subcooling.
- Merlin 1D vacuum thrust increased by subcooling the propellants.
- several small mass-reduction efforts.

The modified design gained an additional 1.2 metres (3 ft 11 in) of height, stretching to exactly 70 metres (230 ft) including payload fairing, while gaining an overall performance increase of 33 percent. The new first-stage engine has a much increased thrust-to-weight ratio.

The full-thrust first stage booster could reach low Earth orbit as a single-stage-to-orbit if it is not carrying the upper stage and a heavy satellite.

Versions launched in 2017 have included an experimental recovery system for the payload fairing halves. On 30 March 2017, SpaceX for the first time recovered a fairing from the SES-10 mission, thanks to thrusters and a steerable parachute helping it glide towards a gentle touchdown on water.

On 25 June 2017 flight (Iridium NEXT 11–20), aluminum grid fins were replaced by titanium versions, to improve control authority and better cope with heat during re-entry. Following post-flight inspections, Elon Musk announced the new grid fins likely will require no service between flights.

==== Autonomous flight termination system ====
SpaceX has been developing for some time an alternative autonomous system to replace the traditional ground-based systems that had been in use for all US launches for over six decades. The autonomous system has been in use on some of SpaceX' VTVL suborbital test flights in Texas, and has flown in parallel on a number of orbital launches as part of a system test process to gain approval for use on operational flights.

In February 2017, SpaceX's CRS-10 launch was the first operational launch utilizing the new Autonomous Flight Safety System (AFSS) on "either of Air Force Space Command's Eastern or Western Ranges." The following SpaceX flight, EchoStar 23 in March, was the last SpaceX launch utilizing the historic system of ground radars, tracking computers, and personnel in launch bunkers that had been used for over sixty years for all launches from the Eastern Range. For all future SpaceX launches, AFSS has replaced "the ground-based mission flight control personnel and equipment with on-board Positioning, Navigation and Timing sources and decision logic. The benefits of AFSS include increased public safety, reduced reliance on range infrastructure, reduced range spacelift cost, increased schedule predictability and availability, operational flexibility, and launch slot flexibility."

==== Block 4 ====
In 2017, SpaceX started flying incremental changes to the Falcon 9 Full Thrust version, calling them "Block 4". At first, only the second stage was modified to Block 4 standards, flying on top of a "Block 3" first stage for three missions: NROL-76 and Inmarsat-5 F4 in May 2017, and Intelsat 35e in July. Block 4 was described as a transition between the Full Thrust v1.2 "Block 3" and the following Falcon 9 Block 5. It includes incremental engine thrust upgrades leading to the final thrust for Block 5. The maiden flight of the full Block 4 design (first and second stages) was the NASA CRS-12 mission on 14 August 2017.

==== Block 5 ====
SpaceX announced in 2017 that another series of incremental improvements were in development, a Falcon 9 Block 5 version, which has succeeded the transitional Block 4. The largest changes between Block 3 and Block 5 are higher thrust on all of the engines and improvements on landing legs. Additionally, numerous small changes will help streamline recovery and re-usability of first-stage boosters. Alterations are focused on increasing the speed of production and efficiency of re-usability. SpaceX aims to fly each Block 5 booster ten times with only inspections in between, and up to 100 times with refurbishment.

Block 5 second stages can be built with a mission extension kit to allow longer duration and/or more engine starts.

=== Rocket specifications ===
Falcon 9 Full Thrust specifications and characteristics are as follows:

Characteristic	First stage	Second stage	Payload fairing
Height	42.6 m (140 ft)	12.6 m (41 ft)	13.2 m (43 ft)
Diameter	3.7 m (12 ft)	3.7 m (12 ft)	5.2 m (17 ft)
Empty mass (Note: without propellant)	22,200 kg (48,900 lb)	4,000 kg (8,800 lb)	1,700 kg (3,700 lb)
Gross mass (Note: with propellant)	433,100 kg (954,800 lb)	111,500 kg (245,800 lb)	—N/a
Structure type	LOX tank: monocoque Fuel tank: skin and stringer	LOX tank: monocoque Fuel tank: skin and stringer	Monocoque halves
Structure material	Aluminum lithium skin; aluminum domes		Carbon fiber
Engines	9 × Merlin 1D	1 × Merlin 1D Vacuum	—N/a
Engine type	Liquid, gas-generator		—N/a
Fuel	Kerosene (RP-1)		—N/a
Oxidizer	Subcooled liquid oxygen (LOX)	Liquid oxygen (LOX)	—N/a
LOX tank capacity	287,400 kg (633,600 lb)	75,200 kg (165,800 lb)	—N/a
RP-1 tank capacity	123,500 kg (272,300 lb)	32,300 kg (71,200 lb)	—N/a
Engine nozzle	Gimbaled, 16:1 expansion	Gimbaled, 165:1 expansion	—N/a
Total thrust	845.2 kN x 9 (7,607 kN (1,710,000 lb_{f}))	934 kN x 1 (934 kN (210,000 lb_{f}))	—N/a
Propellant feed system	Turbopump		—N/a
Throttle capability	845–482 kN (190,000–108,300 lbf) per engine	930–360 kN (210,000–81,000 lb_{f}) per engine	—N/a
Restart capability	Yes (only 3 engines for boostback/reentry/landing burns)	Yes, dual redundant TEA-TEB pyrophoric igniters	—N/a
Tank pressurization	Heated helium		—N/a
Ascent attitude control (pitch, yaw)	Gimbaled engines	Gimbaled engine and nitrogen gas thrusters	—N/a
Ascent attitude control (roll)	Gimbaled engines	Nitrogen gas thrusters	—N/a
Coast/descent attitude control	Nitrogen gas thrusters and grid fins	Nitrogen gas thrusters	Nitrogen gas thrusters
Shutdown process	Commanded		—N/a
Stage separation system	Pneumatic	—N/a	Pneumatic

The Falcon 9 Full Thrust uses a 4.5 meter long interstage which is longer and stronger than the Falcon 9 v1.1 interstage. It is a "composite structure consisting of an aluminum honeycomb core surrounded by a carbon fiber face sheet plies". The overall length of the vehicle at launch is 70 meters, and the total fueled mass is 549,000 kg. The aluminium-lithium alloy used is 2195-T8.

The Falcon 9 Full Thrust upgraded vehicle "includes first-stage recovery systems, to allow SpaceX to return the first stage to the launch site after completion of primary mission requirements. These systems include four deployable landing legs, which are locked against the first-stage tank during ascent. Excess propellant reserved for Falcon 9 first-stage recovery operations will be diverted for use on the primary mission objective, if required, ensuring sufficient performance margins for successful missions". The nominal payload capacity to a geostationary transfer orbit is 5,500 kilograms (12,100 lb) with the first-stage recovery (the price per launch is US$62 million), versus 8,300 kilograms (18,300 lb) with an expendable first-stage.

== Development history ==
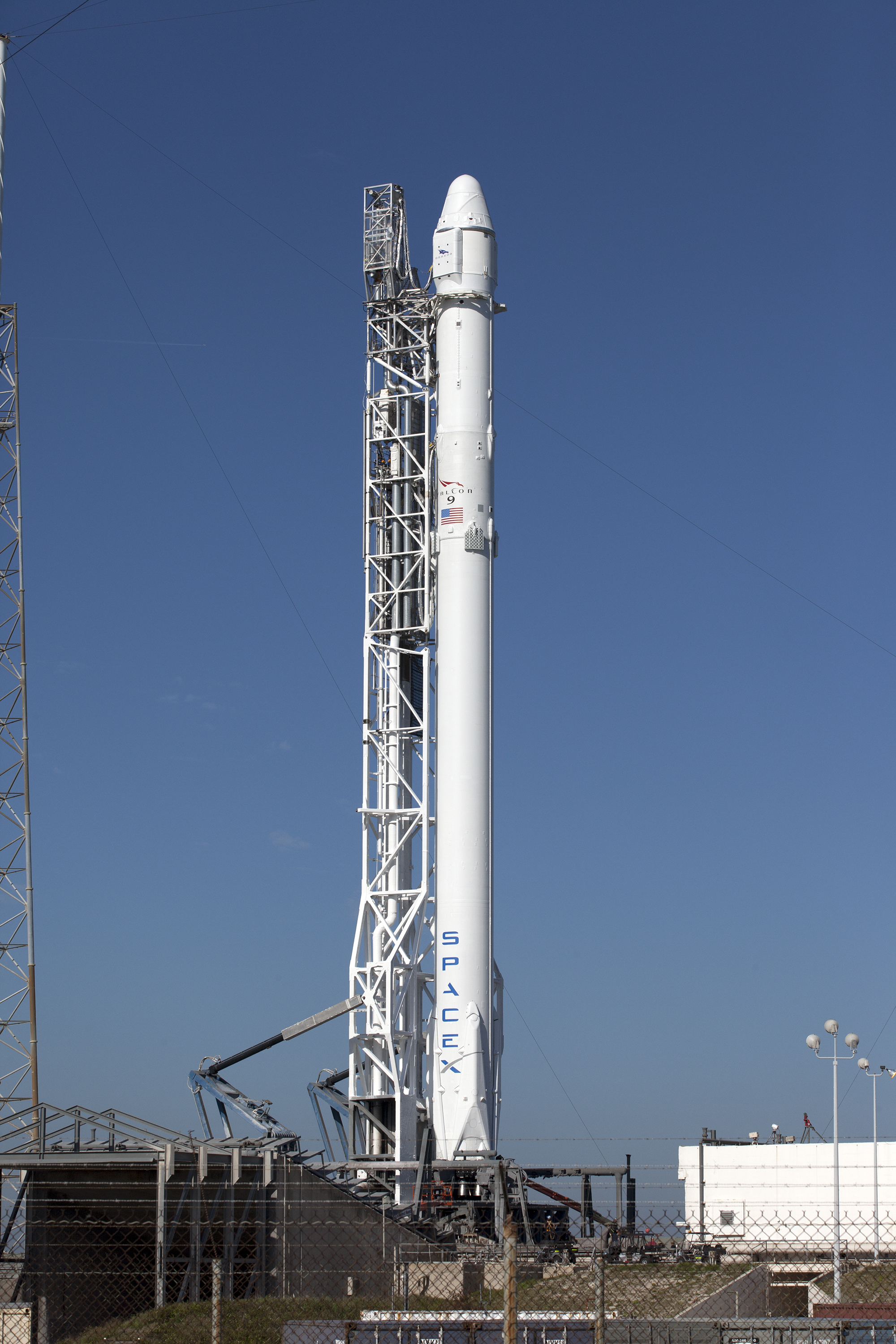
Falcon 9 Full Thrust rocket with the SpaceX CRS-8 Dragon spacecraft on the launch pad in April 2016

=== Development ===
As early as March 2014, SpaceX pricing and payload specifications published for the expendable Falcon 9 v1.1 rocket actually included about 30 percent more performance than the published price list indicated. At that time, the additional performance was reserved for SpaceX to conduct reusability testing with the Falcon 9 v1.1 while still achieving the specified payloads for customers. Many engineering changes to support reusability and recovery of the first stage had been made on this earlier v1.1 version. SpaceX indicated they had room to increase the payload performance for the Falcon 9 Full Thrust, or decrease launch price, or both.

In 2015, SpaceX announced a number of modifications to the previous version Falcon 9 v1.1 launch vehicle. The new rocket was known internally for a while as Falcon 9 v1.1 Full Thrust, but was also known under a variety of names including Falcon 9 v1.2, Enhanced Falcon 9, Full-Performance Falcon 9, Upgraded Falcon 9, and Falcon 9 Upgrade. Since the first flight of the "full thrust upgrade", SpaceX has been referring to this version as just Falcon 9.

SpaceX President Gwynne Shotwell explained in March 2015 that the new design would result in streamlined production as well as improved performance:

So, we got the higher thrust engines, finished development on that, we're in [qualification testing]. What we're also doing is modifying the structure a little bit. I want to be building only two versions, or two cores in my factory, any more than that would not be great from a customer perspective. It's about a 30% increase in performance, maybe a little more. What it does is it allows us to land the first stage for GTO missions on the drone ship.

According to a SpaceX statement in May 2015, Falcon 9 Full Thrust would likely not require a recertification to launch for United States government contracts. Shotwell stated that "It is an iterative process [with the agencies]" and that "It will become quicker and quicker to certify new versions of the vehicle." The US Air Force certified the upgraded version of the launch vehicle to be used on US military launches in January 2016, based on the one successful launch to date and the demonstrated "capability to design, produce, qualify, and deliver a new launch system and provide the mission assurance support required to deliver NSS (national security space) satellites to orbit".

=== Testing ===
The upgraded first stage began acceptance testing at SpaceX's McGregor facility in September 2015. The first of two static fire tests was completed on 21 September 2015 and included the subcooled propellant and the improved Merlin 1D engines. The rocket reached full throttle during the static fire and was scheduled for launch no earlier than 17 November 2015.

=== Maiden flight ===
SES S.A., a satellite owner and operator, announced plans in February 2015 to launch its SES-9 satellite on the first flight of the Falcon 9 Full Thrust. In the event, SpaceX elected to launch SES-9 on the second flight of the Falcon 9 Full Thrust and to launch Orbcomm OG2's second constellation on the first flight. As Chris Bergin of NASASpaceFlight explained, SES-9 required a more complicated second-stage burn profile involving one restart of the second-stage engine, while the Orbcomm mission would "allow for the Second Stage to conduct additional testing ahead of the more taxing SES-9 mission."

Falcon 9 Full Thrust completed its maiden flight on 22 December 2015, carrying an Orbcomm 11-satellite payload to orbit and landing the rocket's first stage intact at SpaceX's Landing Zone 1 at Cape Canaveral. The second mission, SES-9, occurred on 4 March 2016.

== Launch history ==
As of October 13, 2026, the Falcon 9 Full Thrust version has flown 674 missions with a success rate of 99.9%. The first stage was recovered in 652 of them. One rocket was destroyed during pre-launch tests and is not counted as one of the flown missions. One mission reached a lower than intended orbit, the only in-flight accident of the Full Thrust version.

On 1 September 2016, the rocket carrying Spacecom's AMOS-6 exploded on its launchpad (Launch Complex 40) while fueling in preparation for a static fire test. The test was being conducted in preparation for the launch of the 29th Falcon 9 flight on 3 September 2016. The vehicle and $200m payload were destroyed in the explosion. The subsequent investigation showed the root cause to be ignition of solid or liquid oxygen compressed between layers of the immersed helium tanks' carbon-fiber wrappings. To resolve the issue for further flights, SpaceX made design changes to the tanks and changes to their fueling procedure.

== Launch and landing sites ==
=== Launch sites ===
SpaceX first used Launch Complex 40 at Cape Canaveral Air Force Station and Space Launch Complex 4E at Vandenberg Air Force Base for Falcon 9 Full Thrust rockets, like its predecessor Falcon 9 v1.1. Following the 2016 accident at LC-40, launches from the East Coast were switched to the refurbished pad LC-39A at Kennedy Space Center, leased from NASA.

Architectural and engineering design work on changes to LC-39A had begun in 2013, the contract to lease the pad from NASA was signed in April 2014, with construction commencing later in 2014, including the building of a large Horizontal Integration Facility (HIF) in order to house both Falcon 9 and Falcon Heavy launch vehicles with associated hardware and payloads during processing. The first launch occurred on 19 February 2017 with the CRS-10 mission. Crew Access Arm and White Room work still need to be completed before crewed launches with the SpaceX Dragon 2 capsule scheduled for 2019.

An additional private launch site, intended solely for commercial launches, was planned at Starbase near Brownsville, Texas following a multi-state evaluation process in 2012–mid-2014 looking at Florida, Georgia, and Puerto Rico. However, the focus of the site has been changed from Falcon 9 and Falcon Heavy launches to VTOL test flights of a subscale Starship Hopper test vehicle. It is very unlikely that it will ever be used for Falcon 9 or Heavy flights, as the current launch pads provide more than enough launch capability.

=== Landing sites ===
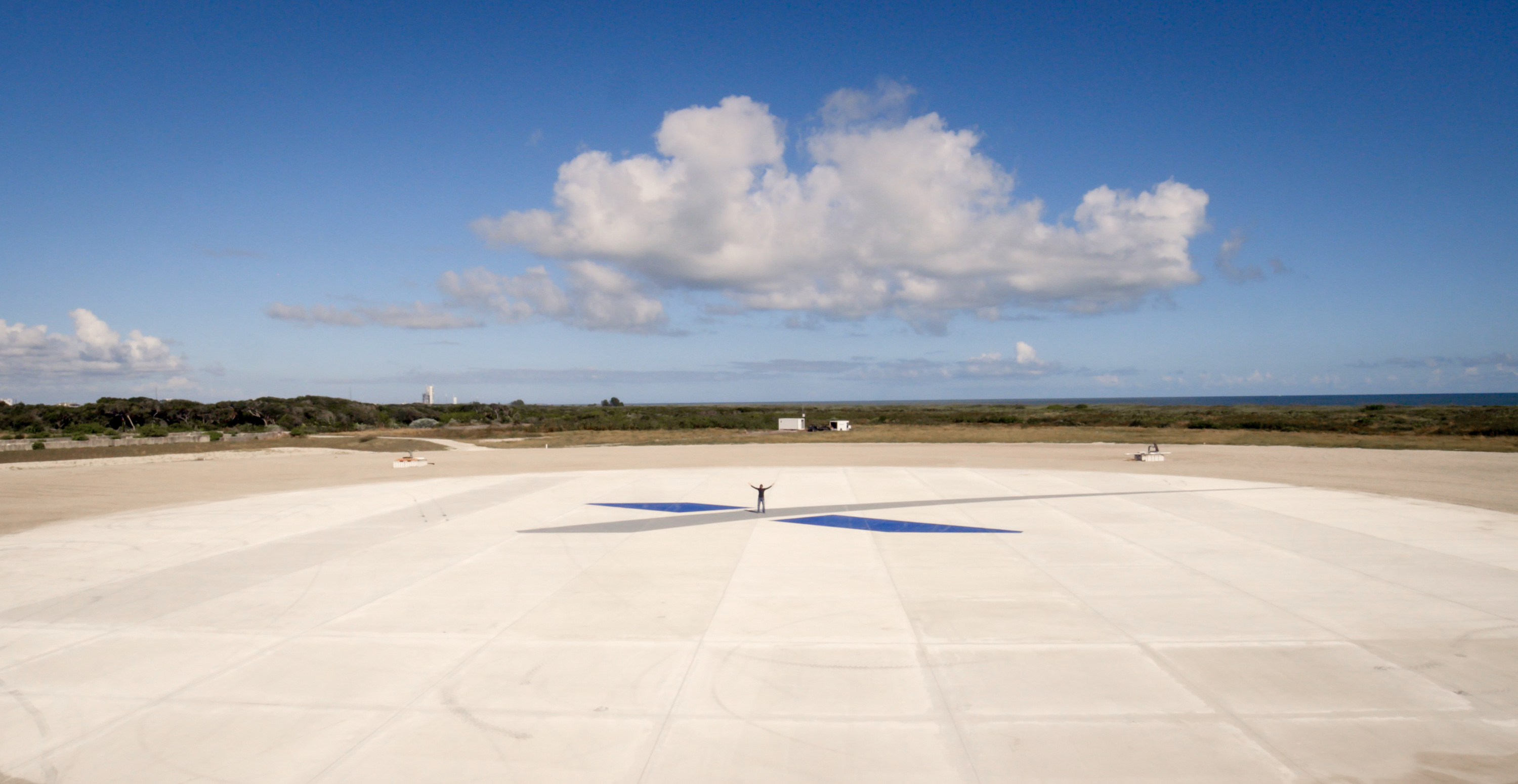
Landing Zone 1 at Cape Canaveral Space Force Station

SpaceX has completed construction of a landing zone at Cape Canaveral Air Force Station, known as LZ-1. The zone, consisting of a pad 282 feet (86 m) in diameter, was first used on 16 December 2015 with a successful landing of Falcon 9 Full Thrust. The landing on LZ-1 was the first overall successful Falcon 9 and the third landing attempt on a hard surface. As of 4 June 2020, only one landing attempt has failed. The booster landed just offshore. In the following few days, it was towed back to Port Canaveral, raised out of the water using two cranes, and brought back to a SpaceX hangar.

Directly next to LZ-1 SpaceX constructed LZ-2 to allow simultaneous booster landings after Falcon Heavy flights. Since then, several boosters have landed at LZ-2. Later SpaceX retired both these pads to dedicated landing pads at LC-39A and SLC-40, starting with LZ-40's debut in 2026.

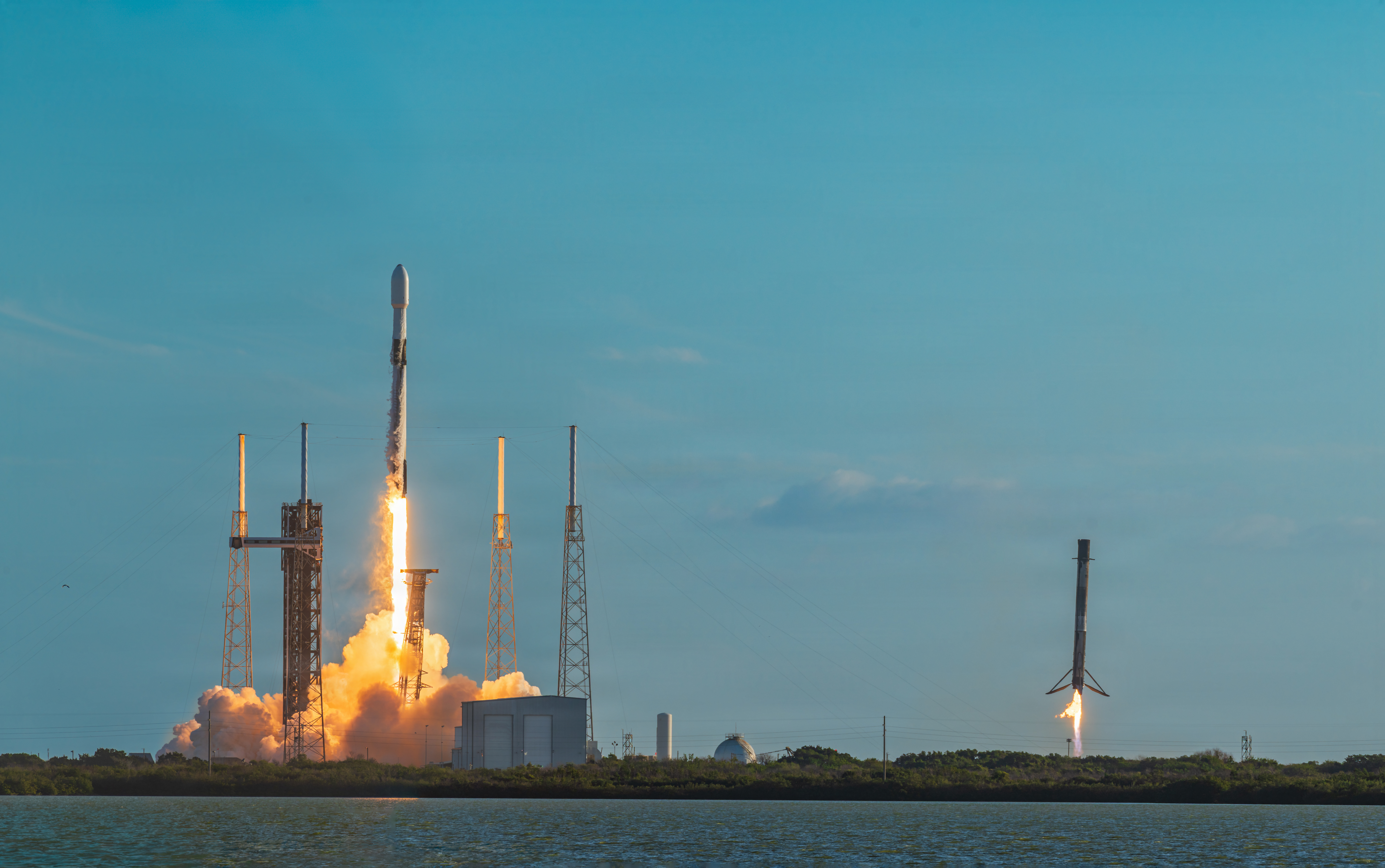
Composite image of NG-24 launch from SLC-40 and subsequent booster landing at LZ-40, capturing both events 8 minutes apart

SpaceX also created a landing site at the former launch complex SLC-4W at Vandenberg Air Force Base. In 2014, the launch site was demolished for reconstruction as a landing site. On 8 October 2018, a Falcon 9 rocket booster successfully landed at the new ground pad, known as LZ-4, for the first time.

=== Drone ships ===
Starting in 2014, SpaceX commissioned the construction of autonomous spaceport drone ships (ASDS) from deck barges, outfitted with station-keeping engines and a large landing platform. The ships, which are stationed hundreds of kilometers downrange, allow for first stage recovery on high-velocity missions which cannot return to the launch site.

SpaceX has three operational drone ships, Just Read the Instructions(V1/V2, V1 is retired), Of Course I Still Love You and A Shortfall of Gravitas. Both A Shortfall of Gravitas and Just Read the Instructions(V2) are used in the Atlantic from Port Canaveral for launches from Cape Canaveral, while Of Course I Still Love You is being operated in the Pacific from the Port of Long Beach for Vandenberg launches.
