= Orlets =

Decommissioned Russian reconnaissance satellites

Orlets (Russian: Орлец) was a series of Russian, and previously Soviet photoreconnaissance satellites derived from and intended to augment the Yantar series of spacecraft. Ten satellites were launched between 1989 and 2006; eight in the Orlets-1 configuration and two in the Orlets-2 configuration.

Orlets satellites conducted optical imaging, returning images by means of film capsules. Orlets-1 spacecraft carried eight film capsules, whilst Orlets-2 carried twenty-two. Orlets-1 were launched by Soyuz-U and Soyuz-U2 carrier rockets, with the larger Zenit-2 being used to launch Orlets-2.

== Satellites ==
Spacecraft	Type	Launch Date (UTC)	Carrier rocket	Launch pad	Orbit	Termination*	Remarks
Kosmos 2031	Orlets-1	18 July 1989; 12:10	Soyuz-U	1/5		31 August 1989	
Kosmos 2101	Orlets-1	1 October 1990; 11:00	Soyuz-U2	1/5		30 November 1990	
Kosmos 2163	Orlets-1	9 October 1991; 13:15	Soyuz-U2	1/5		6 December 1991	
Kosmos 2225	Orlets-1	22 December 1992; 12:00:00	Soyuz-U	31/6		18 February 1993	
Kosmos 2262	Orlets-1	7 September 1993; 13:25:00	Soyuz-U2	31/6		18 December 1993	
Kosmos 2290	Orlets-2	26 August 1994; 12:00	Zenit-2	45/1		4 April 1995	
Kosmos 2343	Orlets-1	15 May 1997; 12:10:00	Soyuz-U	31/6		18 September 1997	
Kosmos 2372	Orlets-2	25 September 2000; 10:10	Zenit-2	45/1		20 April 2001	
Kosmos 2399	Orlets-1	12 August 2003; 14:20:00	Soyuz-U	31/6		9 December 2003	
Kosmos 2423	Orlets-1	14 September 2006; 13:41:00	Soyuz-U	31/6		17 November 2006	

* — Orlets-1 missions terminated by self-destruct, Orlets-2 by controlled deorbit
