= AMOS-5 (satellite) =

AMOS communications satellite

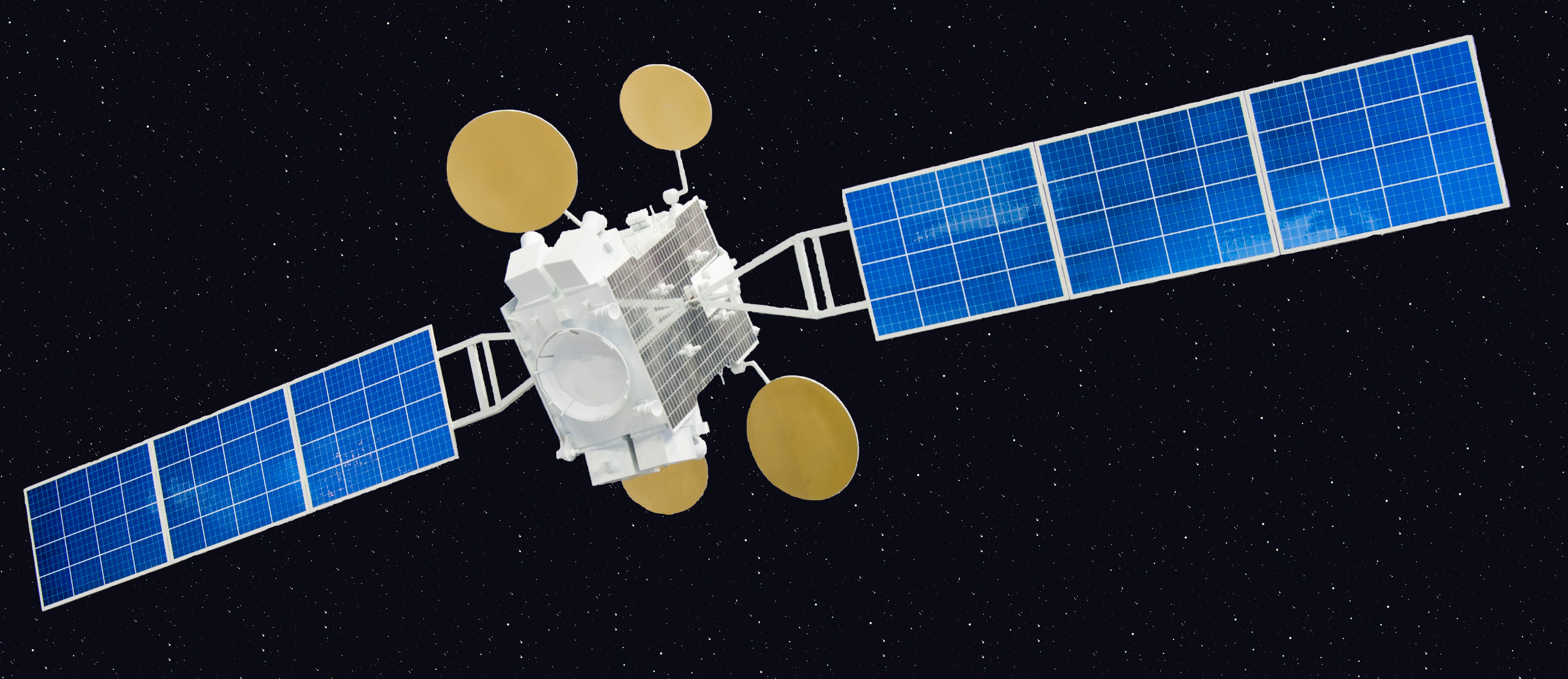
- AMOS-5 satellite with stars background
- Names: Affordable Modular Optimized Satellite-5
- Mission type: Communications
- Operator: Spacecom Satellite Communications
- COSPAR ID: 2011-074A
- SATCAT no.: 37950
- Website: https://www.amos-spacecom.com
- Mission duration: 15 years (planned); 4 years (achieved)

Spacecraft properties
- Spacecraft: AMOS-5
- Spacecraft type: Ekspress
- Bus: Express 1000H
- Manufacturer: Reschetnev (NPO PM) (bus); Thales Alenia Space (payload)
- Launch mass: 1,972 kg (4,348 lb)
- Power: 5.6 kW

Start of mission
- Launch date: 11 December 2011, 11:17:00 UTC
- Rocket: Proton-M / Briz-M
- Launch site: Baikonur, Site 81/24
- Contractor: Khrunichev State Research and Production Space Center
- Entered service: February 2012

End of mission
- Deactivated: 21 November 2015

Orbital parameters
- Reference system: Geocentric orbit
- Regime: Geostationary orbit
- Longitude: 17° East

Transponders
- Band: 34 transponders: 18 C-band; 16 Ku-band
- Bandwidth: 36 MHz and 72 MHz
- Coverage area: Israel, Africa, Europe, Middle East

Amos-5 (Hebrew: עמוס 5) was an Israeli commercial communications satellite, part of the AMOS series of satellites. It was developed and built for Spacecom by Information Satellite Systems Reshetnev (NPO PM), the largest Russian satellite producer, at a cost of US$157 million. The satellite was positioned at the 17° East longitude in the geostationary orbit. It was launched on 11 December 2011, 11:17:00 UTC from Baikonur Cosmodrome, Kazakhstan, atop a Proton-M / Briz-M launch vehicle. It provided coverage over the continent of Africa, as well as Europe and the Middle East.

== Mission ==
Following failure of power generator 1, generator 2 was activated in May 2012. Power generator 2 also developed faults in September 2012 and October 2013 and the satellite's initial lifespan of 15 years was expected to be shortened by 11 months. However all communications with the AMOS-5 satellite were lost on 21 November 2015. The satellite was visualized in its expected location, moving in an uncontrolled fashion, most likely due to power failure. Three weeks later, Spacecom announced that the satellite had failed completely. It is expected to continue to orbit at an altitude of 42,000 km for the foreseeable future. AMOS-5, which brought in annual revenue of some US$40 million, has an estimated value of between US$160 million and US$190 million. It is insured by an international syndicate for US$158 million. AMOS-5 was produced by the Russian company NPO PM, and cost US$157 million. It is the biggest of Spacecom's satellites and its only satellite, other than AMOS-17 (which was developed by Boeing), not to be manufactured by IAI.

== See also ==
- 2011 in spaceflight
- Amos (satellite)
- List of broadcast satellites
- Spacecom
