= Zenit-2M =

Ukrainian rocket

Zenit-2M/2SB/2SLB
- Zenit-2M
- Function: Carrier rocket
- Manufacturer: Yuzhmash
- Country of origin: Ukraine

Size
- Height: 57.35 metres (188.2 ft)
- Diameter: 3.9 metres (13 ft)
- Mass: 458,900 kilograms (1,011,700 lb)
- Stages: Two

Capacity

Payload to LEO
- Mass: 12,030 kilograms (26,520 lb)

Associated rockets
- Family: Zenit
- Derivative work: Zenit-3SLB; Zenit-3SLBF

Launch history
- Status: Retired
- Launch sites: Baikonur Site 45/1
- Total launches: 2
- Success(es): 2
- First flight: 29 June 2007
- Last flight: 8 November 2011

First stage
- Height: 32.9 m (108 ft)
- Diameter: 3.9 m (13 ft)
- Empty mass: 27,564 kg (60,768 lb)
- Gross mass: 354,350 kg (781,210 lb)
- Propellant mass: RG-1: 90,219 kg (198,899 lb); LOX: 236,567 kg (521,541 lb)
- Powered by: RD-171
- Maximum thrust: Sea Level: 7,257 kN (1,631,000 lbf); Vacuum: 7,908 kN (1,778,000 lbf)
- Specific impulse: Sea Level: 309.5 s (3.035 km/s); Vacuum: 337.2 s (3.307 km/s)
- Burn time: 140-150 seconds
- Propellant: LOX/RG-1

Second stage
- Height: 10.4 m (34 ft)
- Diameter: 3.9 m (13 ft)
- Empty mass: 8,307 kg (18,314 lb)
- Gross mass: 90,794 kg (200,167 lb)
- Propellant mass: RG-1: 23,056 kg (50,830 lb); LOX: 59,431 kg (131,023 lb)
- Powered by: 1 RD-120; 1 RD-8
- Maximum thrust: RD-120: 912 kilonewtons (205,000 lb_{f}); RD-8: 79.4 kilonewtons (17,800 lb_{f})
- Specific impulse: Vacuum: RD-120: 350 s (3.4 km/s); RD-8: 342.8 s (3.362 km/s)
- Burn time: 360-370 seconds
- Propellant: LOX/RG-1

The Zenit-2M, Zenit-2SB, Zenit-2SLB or Zenit-2FG was a Ukrainian expendable carrier rocket derived from the Zenit-3SL. It was a member of the Zenit family of rockets, which were designed by the Yuzhmash.

== Development ==
The Zenit 2M was a modernised version of the Zenit-2, incorporating modifications and upgrades made to the design for the Sea Launch programme.

Launches of Zenit-2M rockets were conducted from Baikonur Cosmodrome Site 45/1. Commercial launches are conducted by Land Launch, and use the designation 2SLB, however as of 2011, no commercial launches have been ordered and no launch of 2SLB has taken place as of 2023. Launches conducted by Roskosmos or the Russian Space Forces use the designation 2M. The designation 2SB can also be applied to the rocket when it is being used as part of a larger vehicle, such as the Zenit-3SLB.

The first launch of a Zenit-2M occurred on 29 June 2007, carrying the last Tselina-2 ELINT satellite for the Russian Space Forces, Tselina-2 satellites having been previously launched by older Zenit-2 rockets. The second launch, carrying the Fobos-Grunt and Yinghuo-1 spacecraft, was conducted on 8 November 2011, using a modified configuration designated the Zenit-2FG. This configuration incorporated the payload fairing used on the Zenit-3F rocket, and a special adaptor for the Fobos-Grunt spacecraft, which incorporated a Fregat-derived propulsion system. The Zenit-2 and Zenit-2M, however, were supplanted by the Zenit-3SLB after 2008.

== See also ==
- List of Zenit launches
