= AMOS-17 (satellite) =

AMOS communications satellite

- Names: Affordable Modular Optimized Satellite-17
- Mission type: Communications
- Operator: Spacecom Satellite Communications
- COSPAR ID: 2019-050A
- SATCAT no.: 44479
- Website: https://www.amos-spacecom.com
- Mission duration: 20 years (planned); 6 years, 8 months and 22 days (in progress)

Spacecraft properties
- Spacecraft: AMOS-17
- Spacecraft type: Boeing 702MP
- Bus: BSS-702MP
- Manufacturer: Boeing Satellite Development Center
- Launch mass: 6,500 kg (14,300 lb)
- Dimensions: Span: 35 m (115 ft) on orbit

Start of mission
- Launch date: 6 August 2019, 23:23:00 UTC
- Rocket: Falcon 9 Block 5
- Launch site: Cape Canaveral, SLC-40
- Contractor: SpaceX
- Entered service: October 2019

Orbital parameters
- Reference system: Geocentric orbit
- Regime: Geostationary orbit
- Longitude: 17° East

Transponders
- Band: C-band, Ku-band, Ka-band
- Coverage area: Israel, Africa, Europe, Middle East

AMOS-17 is an Israeli commercial communications satellite, part of the AMOS series of satellites.

== History ==
Spacecom, the AMOS satellites operator, announced in December 2016 that it had signed a US$161 million contract with Boeing to build AMOS-17, which was to replace the failed AMOS-5 satellite.

== Satellite description ==
AMOS-17 is a multi-band high-throughput satellite. It features a Ka-band, Ku-band anc C-band communications payload. It was built on the BSS-702MP satellite bus, transmitting in the Ka-band, Ku-band, and C-bands. It is a replacement for AMOS-5 and provides coverage over the continent of Africa, Europe and the Middle East.

== Launch ==
It was launched on 6 August 2019, at 23:23:00 UTC by a Falcon 9 launch vehicle, from Cape Canaveral, SLC-40, Florida. The mass of the payload was too large to allow the booster to be recovered for reuse, so the customer paid for an "expended" launch.

== Mission ==
The satellite was reportedly aimed to be located at 17° East longitude but, early November 2019, it was at 14° East where it has been since 19 August 2019. The satellite recovered its destination to 17° East again meanwhile.
