= AMOS (satellite bus) =

Satellite bus

The AMOS (Hebrew: עמוס), an acronym for Affordable Modular Optimized Satellite, is a family of lightweight satellite bus for geostationary orbit communications satellite designed and manufactured by Israel Aerospace Industries (IAI) of Israel.

== Families ==
Little is known regarding the different variations. But it is known of at least two built versions and a third in development.

== AMOS (original) ==
The AMOS bus is a lightweight version used for satellites between 1.5 and 2 t (1.7 and 2.2 tons), with 800 to 1700 watts of power. The satellite bus started with the AMOS-1, the smallest of all the family, and increased mass, payload successively in the AMOS-2 and AMOS-3.

== AMOS 4000 ==
The AMOS 4000 platform is the second generation, a much bigger and sophisticated satellite bus. It is prepared for satellites weighing between 3 and 5.5 t (3.3 and 6.1 tons) and with power generation between 3 and 12 kW. It offers more autonomous capabilities and advanced control applications. It is composed of three modules: Bus, Repeater and Earth Facing Antennas.

Only two satellites have used this bus: AMOS-4, massing 4,250 kg (9,370 lb) and generating 6 kW of power. And AMOS-6 at 5,400 kg (11,900 lb) and generating 10 kW. But AMOS-6 is enhanced by using electric propulsion for station keeping only. Orbit raising is still done by the more traditional and faster chemical propulsion.

== AMOS E ==
The next development of the AMOS satellite bus is the implementation of pure electric propulsion. The increased efficiency for orbit raising and station keeping in comparison to chemical propulsion can result in reductions of mass of up to 50%. The expected spacecraft mass will be in the 1.5 to 2 t (1.7 to 2.2 tons) range and offer an expected life of 15 years. This new product will be ready by 2018 and IAI expect it to win some foreign orders.

== List of AMOS-based satellites ==
The currently known uses of the AMOS satellite bus has been for most of the AMOS series of civilian communications satellites operated by Spacecom, also of Israel.

- AMOS-1
- AMOS-2
- AMOS-3
- AMOS-4
- AMOS-6

== See also ==
- Ofeq – Ofeq family of satellites on which technology the first versions of the AMOS platform was based.
- EROS (satellite) – EROS family of Earth observation satellites also made by IAI.
