= Zenit-3SLB =

Expendable carrier rocket

Zenit-3SLB/3M
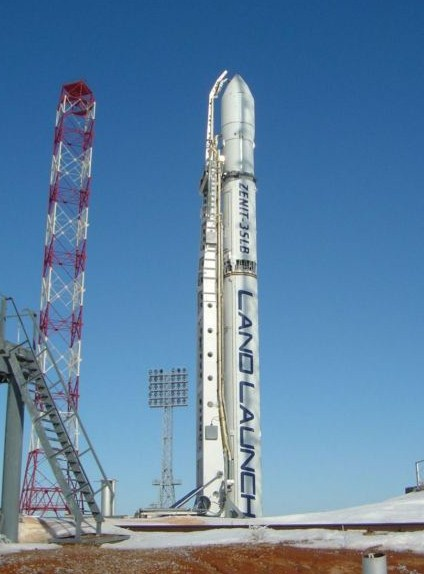
- Zenit-3SLB
- Function: Carrier rocket
- Manufacturer: Yuzhmash
- Country of origin: Ukraine

Size
- Height: 59.6 metres (196 ft)
- Diameter: 3.9 metres (13 ft)
- Mass: 471,000 kilograms (1,038,000 lb)
- Stages: Three

Capacity

Payload to GTO
- Mass: 3,750 kilograms (8,270 lb)

Associated rockets
- Family: Zenit
- Comparable: Zenit-3SLBF

Launch history
- Status: Retired
- Launch sites: Baikonur Site 45/1
- Total launches: 6
- Success(es): 6
- First flight: 28 April 2008 (AMOS-3)
- Last flight: 31 August 2013 (AMOS-4)

First stage – Zenit-2SB First stage
- Height: 32.9 m (108 ft)
- Diameter: 3.9 m (13 ft)
- Empty mass: 27,564 kg (60,768 lb)
- Gross mass: 354,350 kg (781,210 lb)
- Propellant mass: RG-1: 90,219 kg (198,899 lb); LOX: 236,567 kg (521,541 lb)
- Powered by: RD-171
- Maximum thrust: Sea Level: 7,257 kN (1,631,000 lbf); Vacuum: 7,908 kN (1,778,000 lbf)
- Specific impulse: Sea Level: 309.5 s (3.035 km/s); Vacuum: 337.2 s (3.307 km/s)
- Burn time: 140-150 seconds
- Propellant: LOX/RG-1

Second stage – Zenit-2SB Second stage
- Height: 10.4 m (34 ft)
- Diameter: 3.9 m (13 ft)
- Empty mass: 8,307 kg (18,314 lb)
- Gross mass: 90,794 kg (200,167 lb)
- Propellant mass: RG-1: 23,056 kg (50,830 lb); LOX: 59,431 kg (131,023 lb)
- Powered by: 1 RD-120; 1 RD-8
- Maximum thrust: RD-120: 912 kilonewtons (205,000 lb_{f}); RD-8: 79.4 kilonewtons (17,800 lb_{f})
- Specific impulse: Vacuum: RD-120: 350 s (3.4 km/s); RD-8: 342.8 s (3.362 km/s)
- Burn time: 360-370 seconds
- Propellant: LOX/RG-1

Third stage – Blok DM-SLB
- Powered by: 1 RD-58M
- Maximum thrust: 84.9 kilonewtons (19,100 lb_{f})
- Specific impulse: 352 sec
- Burn time: 650 seconds
- Propellant: LOX/RG-1

The Zenit 3SLB or Zenit-3M was a Ukrainian expendable carrier rocket derived from the Zenit-2SB. It was a member of the Zenit family of rockets, which were designed by the Yuzhnoye Design Office.

== History ==
Produced at Yuzhmash, the rocket was a modified version of the Zenit-3SL, designed to be launched from a conventional launch pad rather than the Sea Launch Ocean Odyssey platform. Most of components of the rocket were produced in Russia. The Ukrainian space industry was highly integrated with that of Russia due to its Soviet heritage, but that cooperation was interrupted by the Russo-Ukrainian War beginning in 2014, which effectively led to a hiatus in the Zenit program. The subsequent Russian invasion of Ukraine in 2022 saw damage to its manufacturing facilities due to Russian missile strikes, and what survived those strikes pivoted to producing military weapons.

Launches of Zenit-3SLB rockets were conducted from Site 45/1 at the Baikonur Cosmodrome. Commercial launches were conducted by Land Launch, and used the designation 3SLB, whilst launches conducted by Federal Space Agency Roskosmos or the Russian Space Forces were planned to use the designation 3M.

It consisted of a Zenit 2SB (Zenit-2M) core vehicle, with a Block DM-SLB upper stage by RSC Energia (Russia). The rocket's fairing was developed by Lavochkin (Khimki, Moscow, Russia).

The launch services were provided by "Land Launch", a subsidiary of Sea Launch, and Space International Services, a Russian/Ukrainian joint venture.

The first launch of a Zenit-3SLB occurred on 28 April 2008, carrying the Israeli AMOS-3 satellite. This was also the first commercial Zenit launch from Baikonur since a failed Globalstar launch in 1998, and the first launch to be conducted by the Land Launch consortium.

== Launches ==
Flight No.	Date and time(UTC)	Payload	Orbit	Outcome
1	April 28, 2008	AMOS-3	GEO	Success
2	February 26, 2009	Telstar 11N	GTO	Success
3	June 21, 2009	MEASAT-3a	GTO	Success
4	November 30, 2009	Intelsat 15	GTO	Success
5	October 5, 2011	Intelsat 18	GTO	Success
6	August 31, 2013	AMOS-4	GTO	Success
