= Adapter (rocketry) =

Rocket component

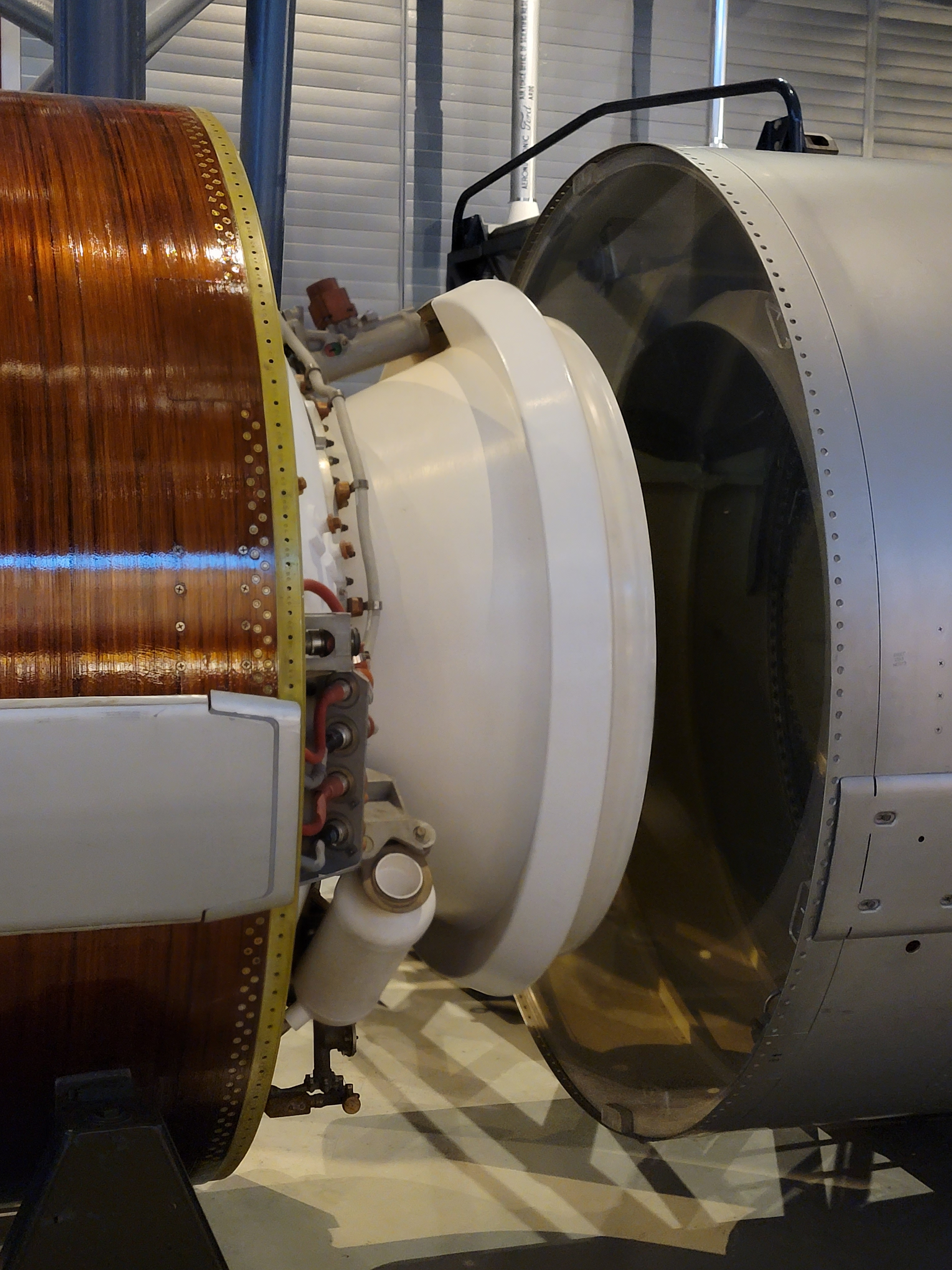
Interstage of the UGM-73 Poseidon missile. First stage is on the right, separated second stage - on the left

In rocketry, an adapter is a hollow cylindrical or conical segment which provides a sound aerodynamic and structural connection, either between rocket stages (often referred to as an interstage) or between a spacecraft and the top rocket stage (referred to as a payload adapter). It may shroud and protect vulnerable systems such as electrics or machinery of rocket engines/spacecraft from weather or vibrations caused by running engines. It is discarded during staging.

Examples of rocket stages featuring an interstage adapter:

- Centaur (second stage of several Atlas-based launch vehicles, from Atlas-Centaur to Atlas V).
- S-II and S-IVB (second and third stage of the Saturn V).
- The Interim Cryogenic Propulsion Stage (ICPS) of SLS Block 1 is connected to the Core Stage with the Launch Vehicle Stage Adapter (LVSA).

Examples of rocket stages featuring a payload adapter:

- (Planned) The Exploration Upper Stage (EUS) of SLS Block 1B/2 is expected to connect large secondary co-manifested payloads using the Universal Stage Adapter (USA).

== Sources ==
- Smith, John (2002-07-07). Evolved Composite Structures for Atlas V. Reston, Virginia: American Institute of Aeronautics and Astronautics. doi:10.2514/6.2002-4201.
