= Palapa-C2 =

Indonesian communications satellite

- Mission type: Communications
- Operator: PT Satelit Palapa Indonesia (SATELINDO)
- COSPAR ID: 1996-030A
- SATCAT no.: 23864
- Website: https://indosatooredoo.com/
- Mission duration: 15 years (planned); 20 years (achieved)

Spacecraft properties
- Spacecraft: Palapa-C2
- Spacecraft type: Boeing 601
- Bus: HS-601
- Manufacturer: Hughes Space and Communications Company
- Launch mass: 3,014 kg (6,645 lb)
- Dry mass: 1,740 kg (3,840 lb)
- Dimensions: Span: 21 m (69 ft)
- Power: 3730 watts

Start of mission
- Launch date: 16 May 1996, 01:56:29 UTC
- Rocket: Ariane 44L H10-3 (V86)
- Launch site: Centre Spatial Guyanais, Kourou, ELA-2
- Contractor: Arianespace
- Entered service: July 1996

End of mission
- Disposal: Graveyard orbit
- Deactivated: November 2016

Orbital parameters
- Reference system: Geocentric orbit
- Regime: Geostationary orbit
- Longitude: 113° East (1996-2009); 150.5° East (2009-2014); 146° East (2014-2016)

Transponders
- Band: 34 transponders: 30 C-band; 4 Ku-band
- Coverage area: Indonesia, Southeast Asia, parts of China, India, Japan, Australia

Palapa-C2 was an Indonesian communications satellite which reached its target orbit on 16 May 1996. It was built by Hughes Space and Communications Company (now Boeing Satellite Development Center) for Indonesian telecommunications provider PT Satelit Palapa Indonesia (SATELINDO). It was based on the HS-601 satellite bus and had 30 C-band transponders and 4 Ku-band transponders. It was due to be located in geosynchronous orbit at 113° East above the equator. It operated for more than 20 years, more than five years past the designed life time of 15 years, making it the longest operation among the Indonesian fleet of communications satellites.

== Satellite description ==
PT Satelit Palapa Indonesia (SATELINDO) chose Hughes in April 1993, together with identical sister satellite, the Palapa-C1. It is a HS-601 satellite bus. Construction was done at El Segundo, California. Hughes also set up the new master control station at Daan Mogot City near Jakarta. The R-4D-11-300 liquid apogee engine of the satellite then raised it to geostationary orbit.

First Digital service was entered by RCTI, ANTV, Indosiar, TPI and other was used MPEG-2 into the Palapa C-2 from 1998 until 2009 moved to Palapa D and then Telkom-4 at 2020.

Indosat TV Link or Satelindo transponder at 4080 H turned on at 2000 to provide any TV station (including MetroTV until 2023 and Global TV until 2010).

== Launch ==
Palapa-C2 was launched along with Amos-1 by an Ariane 44L H10-3 launch vehicle on 16 May 1996 at 01:56:29 UTC. The satellites were launched from Centre Spatial Guyanais at Kourou in French Guiana. Launch was insured for over US$200 million.

== PT Pasifik Satelit Nusantara ==
Six transponders were owned by PT Pasifik Satelit Nusantara.

== Palapa-E ==
PT Indosat Tbk selected in May 2013 Orbital Sciences Corporation (OSC) (now Northrop Grumman) to build and launch the Palapa-E satellite. Palapa-E was meant to replace the Palapa-C2 satellite. Palapa-E was supposed to be based on Orbital's GEOStar-2 satellite bus. Indosat cancelled contract to build Palapa-E after losing the operating rights to the 150.5° East orbital position to state-owned Bank Rakyat Indonesia (BRI).
