= AMOS-2 (satellite) =

AMOS communications satellite

- Names: Affordable Modular Optimized Satellite-2
- Mission type: Communications
- Operator: Spacecom Satellite Communications
- COSPAR ID: 2003-059A
- SATCAT no.: 28132
- Website: https://www.amos-spacecom.com/
- Mission duration: 12 years (planned); 13 years (achieved)

Spacecraft properties
- Spacecraft: AMOS-2
- Spacecraft type: AMOS
- Bus: AMOS Bus
- Manufacturer: Israel Aerospace Industries (bus); Alenia Spazio (payload)
- Launch mass: 1,370 kg (3,020 lb)
- Dry mass: 646 kg (1,424 lb)
- Dimensions: 2.7 m × 2.06 m × 2.38 m (8 ft 10 in × 6 ft 9 in × 7 ft 10 in); Span: 11.03 m (36.2 ft) on orbit
- Power: 1900 watts

Start of mission
- Launch date: 27 December 2003, 21:30:00 UTC
- Rocket: Soyuz-FG / Fregat (s/n D15000-008)
- Launch site: Baikonur, Site 31/6
- Contractor: Progress Rocket Space Centre
- Entered service: January 2004

End of mission
- Disposal: Graveyard orbit
- Deactivated: 2 April 2017

Orbital parameters
- Reference system: Geocentric orbit
- Regime: Geostationary orbit
- Longitude: 4° West

Transponders
- Band: 22 (+ 6 spares) Ku-band
- Bandwidth: 72 MHz
- Coverage area: Central Europe, Israel, Middle East

AMOS-2 is an Israeli commercial second generation communication satellite, part of the AMOS series of satellites. The satellite was positioned at 4° West longitude in the geostationary orbit. Transmission and communication services given by this satellite include: direct distribution of television and radio translations to communication centers, distribution of internet services, data transmissions to communication networks. The new satellite, like its predecessor, will be positioned 36,000 kilometers above the Earth, and it will lie close to AMOS-1, so that the two can share a single space antenna.

== Satellite description ==
AMOS-2 carries 28 Ku-band transponders; twenty-two active with six as backups. With a mass of 1370 kg at launch, AMOS-2 incorporated a 400 newtons liquid apogee boost motor and fourteen 10 newtons reaction control thrusters for raising the satellite's orbit from geostationary transfer orbit (GTO) to its final geostationary orbit as well as for its attitude control. It carried 450 kg of propellant (Monomethylhydrazine and MON-1). AMOS-2 measures 11.03 m in length in its final in-orbit configuration. It is 3-axis body stabilised using Sun and Earth sensors, momentum and reaction wheels. Its solar array generates 1900 watts power, backed up by 24 A·h nickel–cadmium batteries.

== Launch ==
Launch was originally planned on an Ariane but it could not wait until a launch orbital position was available. France sold the launch orbital position to another customer, due to what it claimed were delays in the satellite's production. After IAI threatened a lawsuit, Arianespace arranged the alternative launch on the Soyuz-FG Fregat, which is made by a company jointly owned by Arianespace. It was therefore transferred on Soyuz-Fregat. AMOS-2 was launched on 27 December 2003, at 21:30:00 UTC from Baikonur Cosmodrome, Kazakhstan and it serves clients in three service regions: Middle East (including Israel), Europe and eastern coast of United States. After its launch into geostationary transfer orbit (GTO) by Soyuz-FG launch vehicle, AMOS-2 was taken to its final geostationary orbit by firing the apogee boost motor in phases. After it reached the geostationary orbit, its antenna and solar panels were deployed and the satellite was finally placed in its allocated orbital position of 4° West longitude. AMOS-2 and AMOS-3 are placed in proximity to create common location, which enables to satellite users to increase user abilities without additional antennas.

== Mission ==
In April 2017, Amos Spacecom announced that AMOS-2 has reached the end of its commercial life, and is being cleared from the geostationary orbit to the graveyard orbit.

== See also ==
- AMOS-1
- Spacecom
- List of broadcast satellites
