= AsiaSat 8 =

Asiasat communication satellite

AsiaSat 8 / AMOS-7
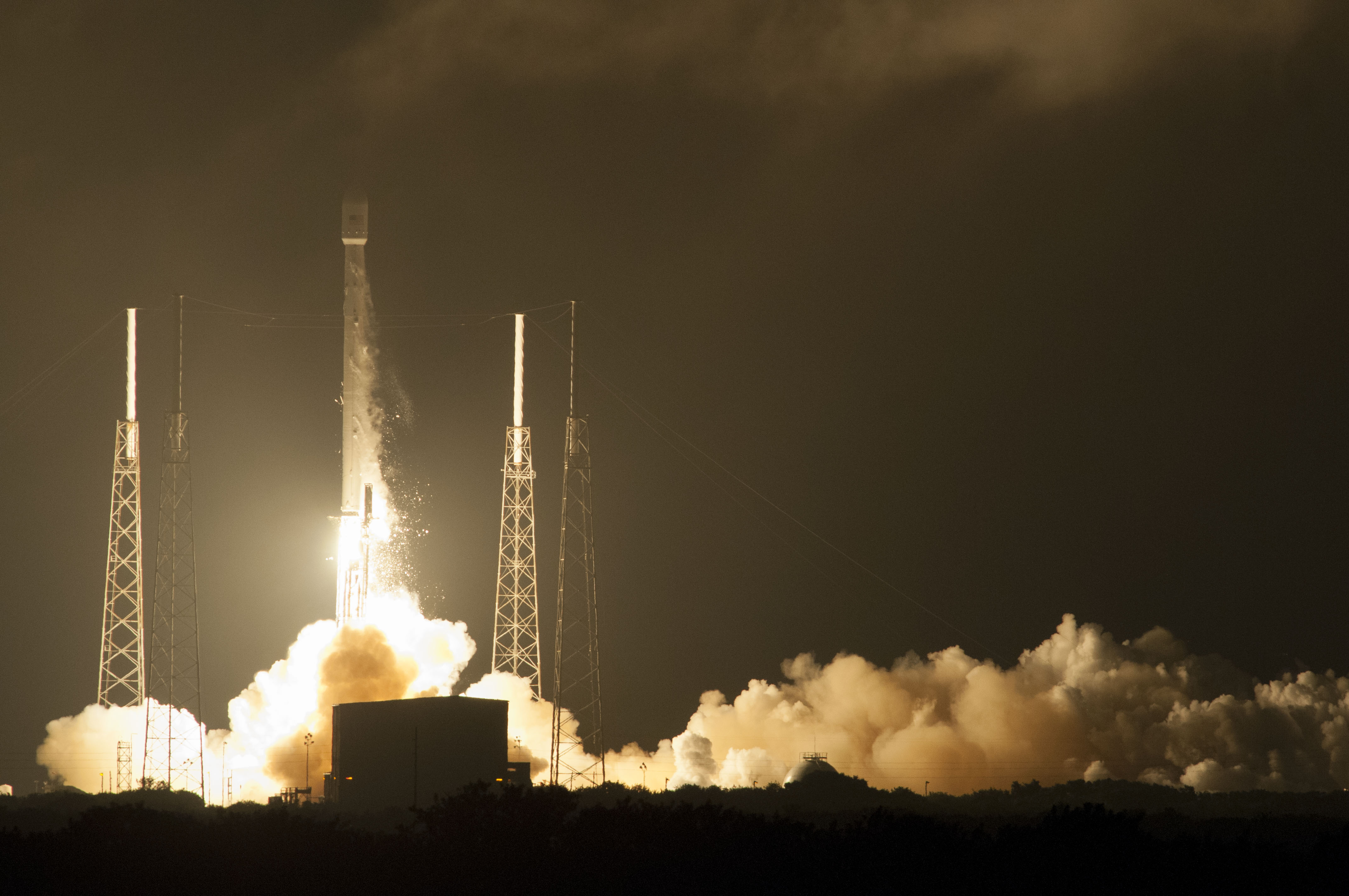
- The launch of the Falcon 9 carrying AsiaSat 8.
- Mission type: Communications
- Operator: AsiaSat (2014–2017, 2025–present); Spacecom (2017–2025)
- COSPAR ID: 2014-046A
- SATCAT no.: 40107
- Website: https://www.asiasat.com https://www.amos-spacecom.com/
- Mission duration: Planned: 15 years Elasped: 11 years, 8 months and 23 days

Spacecraft properties
- Spacecraft: AsiaSat 8
- Spacecraft type: SSL 1300
- Bus: LS-1300
- Manufacturer: Space Systems/Loral
- Launch mass: 4,535 kg (9,998 lb)
- Power: 8.5 kW

Start of mission
- Launch date: 5 August 2014, 08:00 UTC
- Rocket: Falcon 9 v1.1
- Launch site: Cape Canaveral, SLC-40
- Contractor: SpaceX
- Entered service: October 2014

Orbital parameters
- Reference system: Geocentric orbit
- Regime: Geostationary orbit
- Longitude: 105.5° East (2014–2016); 4° West (2016–2025)

Transponders
- Band: 25 transponders: 24 Ku-band; 1 Ka-band
- Bandwidth: 54 MHz
- Coverage area: Asia, Middle East

AsiaSat 8 then AMOS-7 is a Hong Kong-turned-Israeli geostationary communications satellite which is operated by the Asia Satellite Telecommunications Company (Asiasat).

== Satellite description ==
AsiaSat 8 was built by Space Systems/Loral, and is based on the LS-1300 satellite bus. The satellite carries twenty-four Ku-band transponders and one Ka-band payload, and was planned to be initially positioned above the equator, at a longitude of 105.5° East, providing coverage of southern and south-eastern Asia, China and the Middle East.

== Launch ==
SpaceX was contracted to launch AsiaSat 8, using a Falcon 9 v1.1 launch vehicle. The launch took place from Space Launch Complex 40 (SLC-40) at the Cape Canaveral Air Force Station (CCAFS) on 5 August 2014 at 08:00 UTC.

== Falcon 9 upper stage ==
The Falcon 9 upper stage used to launch AsiaSat 8 is derelict in a decaying elliptical low Earth orbit that, as of 13 August 2014, had an initial perigee of 195 km (121 mi) and an initial apogee of 35,673 km (22,166 mi). One month on, in September 2014, the orbit had decayed to an altitude of 185 km (115 mi) at its closest approach to Earth, and by November 2014 had decayed to a 169 km (105 mi) perigee.

== AMOS-7 ==
In December 2016, Spacecom made a US$88 million four-year agreement with AsiaSat to lease AsiaSat 8 Ku-band. It is providing service at 4° West.

== See also ==
- List of Falcon 9 launches
