= Zenit-2 =

Ukrainian-Russian rocket

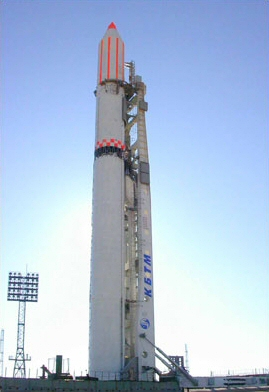
- Zenit-2 at Site 45/1
- Function: Carrier rocket
- Manufacturer: Yuzhmash
- Country of origin: Soviet Union (Ukraine)

Size
- Height: 57 metres (187 ft)
- Diameter: 3.9 metres (13 ft)
- Mass: 460,000 kilograms (1,010,000 lb)
- Stages: Two

Capacity

Payload to LEO
- Mass: 13,740 kilograms (30,290 lb); 11,420 kilograms (25,180 lb) (ISS orbit)

Payload to SSO
- Mass: 5,000 kilograms (11,000 lb)

Associated rockets
- Family: Zenit
- Derivative work: Zenit-2M; Zenit-3SL

Launch history
- Status: Retired
- Launch sites: Baikonur Site 45
- Total launches: 36
- Success(es): 28
- Failure: 7
- Partial failure: 1
- First flight: 13 April 1985
- Last flight: 10 June 2004

First stage
- Powered by: 1 RD-171
- Maximum thrust: 8,180 kilonewtons (1,840,000 lb_{f})
- Specific impulse: 337 s
- Burn time: 150 seconds
- Propellant: RP-1/LOX

Second stage
- Powered by: 1 RD-120; 1 RD-8
- Maximum thrust: 912 kilonewtons (205,000 lb_{f}); 79.5 kilonewtons (17,900 lb_{f})
- Specific impulse: 349 s
- Burn time: 315 seconds
- Propellant: RP-1/LOX

The Zenit-2 was a Ukrainian, previously Soviet, expendable carrier rocket. First flown in 1985, it has been launched 37 times, with 6 failures. It is a member of the Zenit family of rockets designed by Yuzhmash.

== History ==
With a 13–15 ton payload in LEO, it was intended as up-middle-class launcher greater than 7-ton-payload middle Soyuz and smaller than 20-ton-payload heavy Proton. Zenit-2 would be certified for crewed launches and placed in a specially built launch pad at Baykonur spaceport, carrying the new crewed partially reusable Zarya spacecraft that was developed in the late 1980s but then cancelled. Also in the 1980s, Vladimir Chelomey's firm proposed the never-realised 15-ton Uragan spaceplane, which would have been launched by the Zenit-2.

A modified version, the Zenit-2S, is used as the first two stages of the Sea Launch Zenit-3SL rocket. Launches of Zenit-2 rockets are conducted from Baikonur Cosmodrome Site 45/1. A second pad, 45/2, was also constructed, but was used for only two launches before being destroyed in an explosion. A third pad, Site 35 at the Plesetsk Cosmodrome, was never completed, and work was abandoned after the dissolution of the Soviet Union.

The Zenit-2 had its last flight in 2004; it has been superseded by the Zenit-2M, which incorporates enhancements made during the development of the Zenit-3SL. The Zenit-2 has a fairly low flight rate, as the Russian government usually avoids flying national-security payloads on Ukrainian rockets. Zenit-2M itself flew only twice: in 2007 and 2011.

During the late 1990s, the Zenit-2 was marketed for commercial launches. Only one such launch was conducted, with a group of Globalstar satellites, which ended in failure after a computer error resulted in premature cutoff of the second stage.

The second stage, called the SL-16 by western governments, along with the second stages of the Vostok and Kosmos launch vehicles, makes up about 20% of the total mass of launch debris in Low Earth Orbit (LEO). An analysis determined that of the 50 “statistically most concerning” debris objects in low Earth orbit, the top 20 were all SL-16 upper stages.
