= Telstar 11N =

Canadian commercial communications satellite

Telstar 11N is a communication satellite in the Telstar series of the Canadian satellite communications company Telesat. Launched in 2009, it became the first satellite to provide Ku-band coverage of the Atlantic Ocean from the Arctic Circle to the Equator.
