= AMOS-4 (satellite) =

AMOS communications satellite

- Names: Affordable Modular Optimized Satellite-4
- Mission type: Communications
- Operator: Spacecom Satellite Communications
- COSPAR ID: 2013-045A
- SATCAT no.: 39237
- Website: https://www.amos-spacecom.com/
- Mission duration: 12 years (planned); 11 years, 6 months and 18 days (in progress)

Spacecraft properties
- Spacecraft: AMOS-4
- Spacecraft type: AMOS
- Bus: AMOS 4000
- Manufacturer: Israel Aerospace Industries (bus); Thales Alenia Space (payload)
- Launch mass: 4,250 kg (9,370 lb)
- Power: 6 kW

Start of mission
- Launch date: 31 August 2013, 20:05:00 UTC
- Rocket: Zenit-3SLB
- Launch site: Baikonur, Site 45/1
- Contractor: Yuzhmash
- Entered service: October 2013

Orbital parameters
- Reference system: Geocentric orbit
- Regime: Geostationary orbit
- Longitude: 65° East

Transponders
- Band: 12 transponders: 8 Ku-band; 4 Ka-band
- Coverage area: Europe, Israel, Middle East, Russia, Asia

AMOS-4 is an Israeli commercial communications satellite, operated by Spacecom Satellite Communications, Tel Aviv-based, part of the AMOS series of satellites.

== History ==
Spacecom, the AMOS satellites operator, announced in 2007 that it has signed an agreement to build and launch AMOS-4, with Israel Aerospace Industries. IAI constructed the satellite for approximately US$365 million. Spacecom paid US$100 million for AMOS-4. The Israeli government paid Spacecom US$265 million generated from a pre-launch deal to supply it with services on AMOS-4 over the satellite's full 12 year life span. AMOS-4 was originally considered as a candidate for launch on a SpaceX Falcon-9 launch vehicle. The satellite was later assigned to a Zenit-3SLB launch vehicle and was finally launched in August 2013.

== Launch ==
It lifted off on 31 August 2013, 20:05:00 UTC from Baikonur Cosmodrome, Kazakhstan. The geostationary satellite provides direct-to-home television broadcasting, multimedia, broadband Internet and mobile communications services for 12 years, to communication centers, distribution of internet services and data transmissions to communications networks. AMOS-4 extends Spacecom's coverage footprint to Russia and Asia, along with improving service in the Middle East and Europe with Ku-band and Ka-band transponders. The satellite is positioned in geostationary orbit 35,888 km over the equator at 65° East longitude.

== Mission ==
AMOS-4 was initially operated from 67.25° East longitude for in-orbit testing. The satellite is positioned at 65° East longitude in geostationary orbit.

== See also ==
- Spacecom
- List of satellites in geosynchronous orbit
