= Spacecom =

Israeli communications satellite operator

Space Communication Ltd.
- Type: Public
- Traded as: TASE: SCC
- Industry: Communications
- Founded: 1993; 33 years ago
- Headquarters: Ramat Gan, Israel
- Revenue: NIS 513.226 million (2017)
- Operating income: NIS 46.7 million (2017)
- Net income: NIS 94.2 million (2017)
- Total equity: NIS 826.9 million (2017)
- Parent: Eurocom Group
- Website: https://www.amos-spacecom.com/

Spacecom, or Space Communication (Hebrew: חלל תקשורת), is an Israeli communications satellite operator in the Middle East, European Union and North America headquartered in the city of Ramat Gan, Israel. Spacecom operates two satellites at orbital position 4° West – AMOS-3 and AMOS-7, one satellite at orbital position 65° East – AMOS-4, and one satellite at orbital position 17° East – AMOS-5.

== History ==
Spacecom was established in 1993 with the defined goal of marketing AMOS-1, a newly built communication satellite manufactured by Israel Aerospace Industries (IAI). In 2003, Spacecom launched its second satellite, AMOS-2, owned entirely by the company. In 2008, the AMOS-3 satellite was launched to replace AMOS-1 and increase coverage and traffic abilities.

Until 2005, Spacecom was a private company controlled by four companies, including IAI and Eurocom Group. It went public on the Tel Aviv Stock Exchange in 2005.

In August 2016, Spacecom shareholders agreed to sell the company for US$500 million to Beijing Xinwei Technology Group (China) via a Luxembourg business entity. The deal, announced 24 August 2016, was pending the successful entry into service of AMOS-6 after the launch. On 1 September 2016, two days before the scheduled launch date, the satellite was destroyed during the run-up to a static fire test of the Falcon 9 launch vehicle. Later statements from both companies stated that negotiations were ongoing, but that the purchase price was likely to be reduced. However, by April 2017 talks between Spacecom and Xinwei had failed, and Spacecom began a new search for buyers. In October 2021 Spacecom and 4iG Plc., a Hungarian information technology and telecommunications company, signed an agreement in which 4iG is acquiring a majority stake (51%) in Spacecom.

== Coverage ==
Spacecom satellites provide coverage to most of the Middle East, Europe, Asia and Sub-Saharan Africa.

== Services ==
- Direct-to-Home broadcasting (DTH)
- Broadband telephony
- Radio
- Satellite Internet
- VSAT

== Fleet ==
Former

- AMOS-1
- AMOS-2 (4° West)
- AMOS-5 (17° East) – Israeli satellite launched from Kazakhstan in 2011 by Russia's Proton-M launch vehicle to provide services to customers in Africa. AMOS-5 initiated commercial operations in early 2012 with C-band and Ku-band beams. On 21 November 2015, all communications with the AMOS-5 satellite were lost.

In orbit

- AMOS-3 (4° West)
- AMOS-4 (65° East) – was successfully launched on 31 August 2013 from Baikonur, Kazakhstan. It will offer coverage across Southeast Asia along with high power coverage beams offering communication links from East Asia to the Middle East.
- AMOS-7 (4° West) – Lease of AsiaSat 8

Name	Bus	Payload	Order	Launch	Launch Vehicle	Launch Result	Launch Weight	Status	Remarks
AMOS-1	AMOS	7 Ku-band	—N/a	16 May 1996	Ariane 44L	Success	961 kg (2,119 lb)	—N/a	Launched along Palapa-C2. Sold in 2009 to Intelsat as Intelsat 24.
AMOS-2	AMOS	22 Ku-band	—N/a	17 December 2003	Soyuz-FG	Success	1,370 kg (3,020 lb)	Failed on orbit	Reached end of life on 2 April 2017.
AMOS-3	AMOS	15 Ku-band and Ka-band	September 2005	28 April 2008	Zenit-3SLB	Success	1,250 kg (2,760 lb)	—N/a	Straight GEO launch.
AMOS-5	Ekspress-1000H	18 C-band and 16 Ku-band	—N/a	2011-12-11	Proton-M / Briz-M	Success	1,972 kg (4,348 lb)	Failed on orbit	Launched along Luch 5A. Failed on 21 November 2015.
AMOS-4	AMOS 4000	8 Ku-band and 4 Ka-band	—N/a	31 August 2013	Zenit-3SLB	Success	4,250 kg (9,370 lb)	—N/a	
AMOS-6	AMOS 4000	2 S-band, 43 Ku-band and Ka-band	2012	3 September 2016	Falcon 9 Full Thrust	Destroyed before launch	5,500 kg (12,100 lb)	—N/a	Electric propulsion for station keeping.
AMOS-7	SSL-1300	24 Ku-band, 1 Ka-band	—N/a	5 August 2014	Falcon 9	(Launched for AsiaSat)	4,535 kg (9,998 lb)	—N/a	Four-year lease of AsiaSat 8.
AMOS-17	BSS-702MP	Ka-band, Ku-band, C-band	2016	6 August 2019	Falcon 9	Success	6,500 kg (14,300 lb)	—N/a	Deployed with a free launch due to the loss of AMOS-6.
AMOS-8	AMOS 4000	39 Ku-band, 24 Ka-band, 2 S-band	2018	planned 2020	Falcon 9	Cancelled	5,250 kg (11,570 lb)	—N/a	Spacecom selected SSL to build satellite, based on SSL-1300 bus. AMOS-6 replacement. This order was eventually cancelled.

== See also ==
- List of companies of Israel
