= Baikonur Cosmodrome Site 45 =

Rocket launch site

Site 45
- Interactive map of Site 45
- Launch site: Baikonur Cosmodrome
- Location: 45.943°N 63.653°E
- Short name: LC-45
- Operator: RVSN, VKS, RKA
- Total launches: 49
- Launch pad: 2
- Orbital inclination range: 49° – 99°
Site 45/1 launch history
- Status: Active
- Launches: 47
- First launch: 13 April 1985; Zenit-2 / Tselina-2 mass simulator
- Last launch: 30 April 2026; Soyuz-5 / Suborbital Test Flight
- Associated rockets: Zenit-2; Zenit-2M (2SLB) (historical); Zenit-3M (3SLB) (historical); Soyuz-5 (rocket) (Active)
Site 45/2 launch history
- Status: Destroyed
- Launches: 2
- First launch: 22 May 1990; Zenit-2 / Tselina-2
- Last launch: 4 October 1990; Zenit-2 / Tselina-2
- Associated rockets: Zenit-2

Site 45 at the Baikonur Cosmodrome is a launch site currently being used to support the Soyuz-5 rocket. It was previously the launch site for all Soviet and Russian government Zenit launches, along with a commercial launch conducted for Globalstar in 1998, and continuing commercial launches under the Land Launch programme. The main pad at the site is area 45/1, which was completed in 1983 following five years of construction. A second pad, area 45/2, was completed in 1990, but was destroyed by a launch failure in the same year.

The first launch from site 45, using pad 1, occurred on 13 April 1985. This was a sub-orbital test flight of the Zenit-2, and the maiden flight of the Zenit rocket. The launch failed, and was followed up with a second, successful, test flight launched at 08:21 GMT on 21 June 1985. Whilst this launch was also intended to be suborbital, some debris from the launch reached low Earth orbit. The first launch from pad 2 occurred on 22 May 1990, when a Zenit-2 successfully orbited a Tselina-2 ELINT satellite. On the next launch, also from pad 2, the first stage RD-171 engine failed five seconds after launch and the rocket fell back onto the launch pad from a height of about 70 metres (230 ft). The resulting explosion completely destroyed the launch pad, and was reported to have lifted a 1,000 tonne metal structure 20 metres into the air, and to have caused significant damage to lighting towers 100 metres from the pad. Zenit launches resumed from pad 1 around ten months later, pad 2 was not rebuilt.

On 29 June 2007, the first Zenit-2M was launched from pad 1, followed by the first Zenit-3SLB on 28 April 2008.

Facilities to support crewed launches were built at both pads. These included large mobile access towers, which would have allowed the crew to board a spacecraft on top of the rocket. These towers were never used. The tower at area 45/1 is still intact, and the tower at area 45/2 is still standing, but was heavily damaged in the October 1990 explosion. The towers are not used in uncrewed launch operations, as all systems are automated, and no access to the rocket is required.

Following the Russian military intervention in Ukraine in 2014, Russia announced that it was no longer interested in the purchase of Zenit rockets from Ukraine. As a result of this, the last Zenit-3F launched from Site 45 on December 26, 2017. In accordance to the 2016–2025 Russian space master plan, the launch pad was then rebuilt to support the launch of the new Soyuz-5.

In March 2023, it became public that the Baiterek Kazakh-Russian joint venture in charge of the site had filed a claim of about 2 billion rubles (30.3 million US-Dollar) to TsENKI, a Roscosmos subsidiary in charge of handling ground-based infrastructure, as Roscosmos had failed its obligation to conduct an environmental impact assessment of Site 45. This effectively delayed the Baiterek project and the development of Soyuz-5, which had been scheduled to start from Site 45 in 2024.

== See also ==
- Ocean Odyssey

== Literature ==
- "Baikonur. Korolev. Yangel." - M. I. Kuznetsk, Voronezh: IPF "Voronezh", 1997, ISBN 5-89981-117-X
- "Look back and look ahead. Notes of a military engineer" - Rjazhsky A. A., 2004, SC. first, the publishing house of the "Heroes of the Fatherland" ISBN 5-91017-018-X
- «A breakthrough in space» - Konstantin Vasilyevich Gerchik, M: LLC "Veles", 1994, - ISBN 5-87955-001-X
- «At risk,» - A. A. Toul, Kaluga, "the Golden path", 2001, - ISBN 5-7111-0333-1
- "Bank of the Universe" - edited by Boltenko A. C., Kyiv, 2014., publishing house "Phoenix", ISBN 978-966-136-169-9
- "My first life" - Е. A. Anufrienko.
