= Horizons-3e =

Geosynchronous telecoms satellite

- Names: Horizons-3e; IS-H3e
- Mission type: Communication
- Operator: Intelsat/SKY Perfect JSAT Group
- COSPAR ID: 2018-074B
- SATCAT no.: 43633

Spacecraft properties
- Spacecraft: IS-H3e
- Bus: Boeing 702MP
- Manufacturer: Boeing
- Launch mass: 6,500 kg (14,300 lb)

Start of mission
- Launch date: 25 September 2018
- Rocket: Ariane 5 ECA (VA243)
- Launch site: Kourou ELA-3
- Contractor: Arianespace

Orbital parameters
- Reference system: Geocentric
- Regime: Geosynchronous
- Longitude: 169° East

Transponders
- Band: C band and K_{u} band
- Coverage area: Pacific Ocean Region

Horizons-3e, also known as IS-H3e, is a high throughput geostationary communications satellite ordered by Horizons Satellite, a joint venture of Intelsat and SKY Perfect JSAT Group. The spacecraft is designed and manufactured by Boeing on the Boeing-702MP platform.

It is the sixth satellite of the Epic^{NG} service, and covers the Pacific Ocean Region from the 169° East longitude. It has a mixed C band and K_{u} band and was launched in 25 September 2018 on an Ariane 5 rocket.

== Satellite description ==
Horizons-3e was designed and manufactured by Boeing on the Boeing 702MP satellite bus. It has an estimated launch mass of 6 t (6.6 tons) and a design life of more than 15 years.

It is powered by two wings, with four panels each, of triple-junction GsAs solar cells. The 702MP platform was designed to generate between 6 kW and 12 kW.

Its payload is the seventh high throughput Epic^{NG} deployment. The Epic^{NG} is characterized by the implementation of frequency reuse thanks to a mix of frequency and polarization in small spot beams. Not only applied to the classical HTS K_{a} band, but also applying the same technique in K_{u} band and C band. The Epic^{NG} series also keep the use of wide beams to offer high throughput and broadcast capabilities in the same satellite.

== History ==
Horizons Satellite was originally an equal share joint venture with PanAmSat. It ordered its first satellite, Horizons-1/Galaxy 13 from Boeing in middle 2001 and successfully launched it on October 1, 2003. During 2005, PanAmSat was taken over by Intelsat, but the relationship continued and on August 30, 2005, Horizons Satellite ordered a GEOStar-2 based satellite, Horizons-2, which successfully launched on December 21, 2007.

In July 2009, Intelsat became the first customer of the Boeing 702MP platform, when it place an order for four spacecraft, Intelsat 21, Intelsat 22, Intelsat 27 and the first Epic^{NG} satellite, Intelsat 29e.

On June 7, 2012, Intelsat announced the Epic^{NG} platform. It would improve available bandwidth thanks to the use of frequency reuse and polarization and feature spot and wide beams, enabling high bandwidth and broadcast applications on a backward compatible way. The first two satellites would be Intelsat 29e and Intelsat 33e. On September 4, 2012, Intelsat and Boeing announced that Intelsat 29e, the first Epic^{NG} satellite, would be made by Boeing on the 702MP platform, completing the 2009 order of four such satellites.

In May 2013 Intelsat ordered a further four 702MP-based Epic^{NG} satellites, Intelsat 32e, Intelsat 33e and two as of August 2016 unnamed spacecraft. And in July 2014 a sixth Epic was ordered, Intelsat 35e.

In a deal that took 18 months, on November 4, 2015 Intelsat and JSAT announced their fourth joint satellite, after Horizons-1, Horizons-2 and Intelsat 15/JCSAT-85, Horizons-3e. It would be the seventh high throughput satellite in the Intelsat fleet, and complete Intelsat Epic^{NG} family of satellites by covering the Pacific Ocean Region with C band and K_{u} band.
