= Horizons Satellite =

- Type: joint venture
- Industry: Satellite communications
- Founded: July 1, 2001; 25 years ago, United States
- Founders: JSAT Corporation, PanAmSat
- Products: Horizons-1; Horizons-2; Horizons-3e
- Total equity: US$ 110 Millions (2001)
- Owners: SKY Perfect JSAT Group (50%); Intelsat (50%)

Horizons Satellite is a joint venture between Intelsat and SKY Perfect JSAT Group. Originally formed in 2001, pursuant to a memorandum of understanding between JSAT Corporation and PanAmSat for the launch of Horizons-1, it was renewed for Horizons-2. JSAT later merged into the SKY Perfect JSAT Group and PanAmSat was acquired by Intelsat, but the companies continued with the relationship, with the order for Horizons-3e. Horizons-3e was successfully launched on 25 September 2018 and entered service at 169° East. A fourth joint satellite, Horizons-4 (also known as Galaxy 37), was launched on 3 August 2023 and is positioned at 127° West.

Both companies also launched a joint satellite, Intelsat 15/JCSAT-85, but instead of the equal share agreement of this joint venture, JSAT owns a specific payload of 5 transponders out of the 22 K_{u} band transponders of the spacecraft.

== History ==
On August 1, 2001, JSAT Corporation announced an equal share joint venture with PanAmSat, called Horizons Satellite. On September 4, 2001, it ordered from Boeing its first satellite, Horizons-1/Galaxy 13. It was a 4 t (4.4 tons) spacecraft with 24 C band and 24 K_{u} band transponders. It had a 10 kW power generation capacity and 15 years of expected life.

On the same day of the satellite order, Boeing disclosed that it had received a parallel contract from PanAmSat, where the latter had exercised an existing option to launch Horizons-1 from its Sea Launch subsidiary.

On October 22, 2002, JSAT and PanAmSat announced a joint sales agreement where JSAT's clients would gain access to PAS 2 and PAS 8, while PanAmSat's would get JCSAT-2A and JCSAT-3. A week later, on October 28, Horizons Satellites obtained permission to operate in Japan.

Horizons-1 was successfully launched on October 1, 2003 aboard a Zenit-3SL rocket from the Ocean Odyssey platform in the Pacific.

On June 27, 2005, JSAT and PanAmSat announced that they were renewing the partnership by ordering a second satellite, Horizons-2. This K_{u} band satellite would be positioned on the 74°West that belonged to PanAmSat.

On August 30, 2005, Orbital Sciences announced that Horizons Satellite had ordered a small satellite based on the STAR-2 platform, Horizons-2, for the PanAmSat licensed orbital slot at 74°West. It would carry 20 Ku band transponders, generate 3.5 kW of power, weight around 2.3 t (2.5 tons) and was expected to be launched in 2007.

The August 2005 take over of PanAmSat by Intelsat, did not diminished the relationship and, in fact, strengthened the alliance. On December 21, 2007, Horizons Satellite used an Ariane 5 rocket to launch Horizons-2. And, outside of the Horizons Satellite, JCSAT and Intelsat launched the joint satellite Intelsat 15/JCSAT-85 on November 30, 2009 aboard a Zenit-3SLB.

On November 4, 2015, JSAT and Intelsat made a joined statement that they would add a new member to their Horizons joint venture. The satellite, called Horizons 3e, would be based on the Intelsat Epic^{NG} platform, featuring an optimized C band and high throughput K_{u} band payload it would offer mobility and broadband connectivity services in the Asia-Pacific region. It was expected to use the 169°East orbital slot and launch by the second half of 2018.

This would be the fourth joint satellite, along with the other two Horizons Satellite spacecraft, Horizons-1 and Horizons-2 and the separately co-owned JCSAT-85/Intelsat 15. Since this would be an investment within Horizons Satellite, it would not be considered a capital expenditure of the parent companies.

== Horizons Fleet ==
It has two satellites on-orbit Horizons-1 and Horizons-2, with a third, Horizons-3e planned for 2018.

Project	Name	Bus	Payload	Order	Launch	Launch Vehicle	Launch Result	Launch Weight	Status	Remarks
Horizons-1	Horizons-1; Galaxy 13	HS-601HP	24 K_{u} band and 24 C band	2001	2003-10-01	Zenit-3SL	Success	4,060 kg (8,950 lb)	Operational at 127°E	Co-owned with Intelsat.
Horizons-2	Horizons-2	GEOStar-2	20 K_{u} band	2005	2007-12-21	Ariane 5GS	Success	2,304 kg (5,079 lb)	Operational at 85°E	Launched along Rascom-QAF 1. Co-owned with Intelsat
Horizons-3e	—N/a	BSS-702MP	C band and K_{u} band	2015	2019 2nd Half	—N/a	Success	6 t (5.9 long tons; 6.6 short tons)	Operational at 169°E	Horizons Satellite 3rd satellite. Co-owned with Intelsat, Epic^{NG} architecture. Will replace Intelsat 805.

== See also ==
- JSAT (satellite constellation) - One of the two constellations under which the Horizons satellite series are managed.
- List of Intelsat satellites – The other constellation under which Horizons satellites are managed.
