= Mexsat-3 =

Mexican satellite for the MEXSAT telecommunications network

Mexsat Bicentenario
- Names: Mexsat-3
- Mission type: Satellite Communications
- COSPAR ID: 2012-075B
- SATCAT no.: 39035

Spacecraft properties
- Bus: GEOStar-2
- Manufacturer: Orbital Sciences Corporation
- Launch mass: 2,935 kilograms (6,471 lb)
- Power: 3.5 kW/Lithium Ion batteries

Start of mission
- Launch date: 18:50, December 19, 2012 (UTC)
- Rocket: Ariane 5 ECA
- Launch site: Guiana Space Centre, ELA-3

Orbital parameters
- Reference system: geocentric
- Regime: Geostationary
- Longitude: 114.9° West

Transponders
- Band: 12 C band and 12 K_{u} band

Mexsat-3, also known as Mexsat Bicentenario or simply Bicentenario, is the first of three Mexican satellites forming the MEXSAT telecommunications network, and is named to commemorate the bicentennial of the Independence of Mexico. It was launched on 19 December 2012 to serve the other two satellites in the network, Mexsat-1 and Mexsat-2, as a fixed satellite service. It was manufactured by the company Orbital Sciences Corporation and was launched from Kourou in French Guiana, and currently occupies the orbit 114.9° West.

== Objectives ==
The Ministry of Communications and Transportation said in a statement that the new satellite would provide fixed broadband services for access to the Internet, digital high-quality satellite telephony, videoconferencing, remote medical care and education via television. It said that Bicentenario would provide services for emergency care "before, during and after emergencies".

The satellite was equipped with instruments for transmitting and receiving electromagnetic signals in the C and K_{u} bands.

== Launch ==
The French company Arianespace launched an Ariane 5 rocket carrying the Mexsat-3 satellite from the Guiana Space Centre near Kourou, French Guiana at 18:50 local time (21:50 GMT) as part of a previously signed contract. The rocket reached the 100 kilometre mark (the distance from Earth which can be considered an orbit) in the first three minutes.

The satellite was placed in a high geostationary orbit 36,000 kilometres above the surface.

The former deputy secretary of communications at the Ministry of Communications and Transportation, Hector Olavarria, revealed via Twitter after the launch that "in about thirty minutes we will know of the satellite's arrival in orbit". Signals were successfully received shortly afterwards.

== See also ==
- Telecommunications in Mexico
- Mexsat
- Morelos Satellite System
