= Transportation and Communications in Mexico =

Transportation and Communications in Mexico may refer to:

- Communications in Mexico
- Transportation in Mexico

== See also ==
- Secretariat of Communication and Transport (Mexico)
