= Intelsat 15 =

Communications satellite

- Names: IS-15 / JSCAT-85
- Mission type: Communications
- Operator: Intelsat / SKY Perfect JSAT Group
- COSPAR ID: 2009-067A
- SATCAT no.: 36106
- Website: Intelsat; JSAT
- Mission duration: 15 years

Spacecraft properties
- Spacecraft: IS-15
- Bus: Star-2.4
- Manufacturer: Orbital Sciences
- Launch mass: 2,484 kg (5,476 lb)
- Dry mass: 1,227 kg (2,705 lb)
- Power: 4.6 kW

Start of mission
- Launch date: 21:00, November 30, 2009 (UTC)
- Rocket: Zenit-3SLB
- Launch site: Baikonur 45/1
- Contractor: Land Launch

Orbital parameters
- Reference system: Geocentric
- Regime: Geostationary
- Longitude: 85° east
- Semi-major axis: 42,164.0 km (26,199.5 mi)
- Perigee altitude: 35,786.0 km (22,236.4 mi)
- Apogee altitude: 35,800.9 km (22,245.6 mi)
- Inclination: 0°
- Period: 1,436.1 minutes
- Epoch: May 07, 2018

Transponders
- Band: 22 (+8 spares) K_{u} band
- Coverage area: Russia, Near East, Indian Ocean

Intelsat 15, also known as IS-15, is a communications satellite owned by Intelsat. Intelsat 15 was built by Orbital Sciences Corporation, on a Star-2.4. It is located at 85° E longitude on the geostationary orbit. It was launched from Baikonur Cosmodrome to a geosynchronous transfer orbit on 30 November 2009 by a Zenit-3SLB launch vehicle. It has 22 active K_{u} band transponders, plus eight spares. Five of those transponders are owned and operated by SKY Perfect JSAT Group under the name JCSAT-85.

== Satellite description ==
Intelsat 15 is a 3 axis stabilized geostationary communications satellite based on the Star-2.4 satellite bus. It weighed 2,484 kg (5,476 lb) at launch, had a dry mass of 1,227 kg (2,705 lb), and a design life 15 years. It had a power availability dedicated to the payload of 4.6 kW, due to its multi-junction GaAs solar cells. It also had two 4840 watt hour Li-ion batteries for surviving the solar eclipses.

The satellite used a bipropellant propulsion system with an IHI BT-4 Liquid Apogee Engine for orbit circularization and thrusters and reaction wheels for station keeping and attitude control. It was filled with enough propellant for 15 years, but due to the efficient launch and transfer 17 are expected.

Its payload is composed two 2.3 m (7 ft 7 in) deployable dual grid reflectors, plus one 1.4 m (4 ft 7 in) deck mounted reflector. They are fed by 22 active K_{u} band transponders, plus eight spares. Intelsat uses 17 transponders, which have a bandwidth of twenty 36 MHz transponder equivalents. Its footprint is arranged in a Russia beam and a Middle East beam. SKY Perfect JSAT Group owns five physical transponders under the name JCSAT-85, four have a bandwidth of 36 MHz and the other one has 72 MHz. JSCAT-85 footprint is arranged in two beams, West IOR Beam, covering middle East and the Arabic Sea, and East IOR Beam, covering the Eastern Asia coast and Pacific Ocean.

== History ==
On April 2, 2007, JSAT Corporation (now SKY Perfect JSAT Group) announced an agreement to purchase a payload consisting of five transponders on the yet to be built Intelsat 15. Intelsat and JSAT had already collaborated on the Horizons-1 and Horizons-2 satellites. The satellite, also known as IS-15, would provide services to the Asia-Pacific, Indian Ocean and Middle East regions from the 85°E longitude on the geostationary orbit, where it would replace Intelsat 709. It would have 22 K_{u} band transponders in total and a design life of 15 years. The JSAT payload would be known as JCSAT-85.

On May 1, 2007, Orbital Sciences Corporation (now Orbital ATK) announced that it had been awarded a contract to manufacture Intelsat 15. It would be based on the STAR-2 satellite bus, generate 4.6 kW of power for its 22-transponder K_{u} band payload and had an expected launch date of early 2009.

On February 26, 2008, Sea Launch announce a contract with Intelsat to launch two satellites manufactured by Orbital Corporation, Intelsat 15 and Intelsat 16. The contract was itself a renegotiation for repurpose two already existing reservation by Intelsat with Sea Launch for two satellites to these new spacecraft. They were expected to be launched by the Land Launch service, which used Zenit-3SLB rockets from the Baikonur Cosmodrome in Kazakhstan, during 2009.

Between October 27 and November 5, 2009 Intelsat 15 was processed in the Baikonur Cosmodrome. On November 6, it was filled with propellant. On November 24, 2009, JSAT announced that the launch of Intelsat 15 was expected on November 29 at 1:00 UTC. But during the launch attempt on November 29, the automatic prelaunch issued an abort command. But the launch committee agreed to make a second attempt on the next day.

On November 30, 2009, at 21:00 UTC, the Zenit-3SLB successfully launched Intelsat 15, from Baikonur Cosmodrome Site 45. After a six and a half hour mission, the DM-3SLB successfully separated the spacecraft and at 03:28 UTC, first signals from spacecraft were received. The launch put the satellite with margins of its planned geosynchronous transfer orbit with a perigee of 10,286 km, an apogee of 35,790 km and a 12° inclination to the Equator.
