= Morelos Satellite System =

Series of Mexican communications satellites

Morelos I
Spacecraft properties
- Bus: HS-376
- Manufacturer: Hughes Aircraft Corporation
- BOL mass: 646.5 kilograms (1,425 lb)

Start of mission
- Launch date: 17 June 1985
- Rocket: Space Shuttle Discovery/STS-51-G

Transponders
- Band: C band: 18 (+2 spares); K_{u} band: 4 (+2 spares)
- EIRP: C band: 36 dBW; K_{u} band: 44 dBW

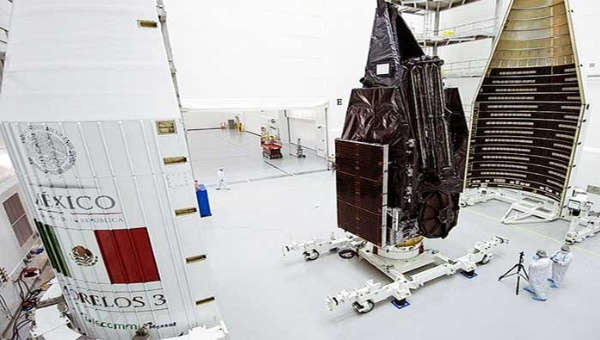

Morelos II
Spacecraft properties
- Bus: HS-376
- Manufacturer: Hughes Aircraft Corporation
- BOL mass: 646.5 kilograms (1,425 lb)

Start of mission
- Launch date: 27 November 1985
- Rocket: Space Shuttle Atlantis/STS-61-B

Transponders
- Band: C band: 18 (+2 spares); K_{u} band: 4 (+2 spares)
- EIRP: C band: 36 dBW; K_{u} band: 44 dBW

Morelos III
- Operator: MEXSAT
- COSPAR ID: 2015-056A
- Mission duration: 15 years

Spacecraft properties
- Bus: 702HP GeoMobile
- Manufacturer: Boeing
- Launch mass: 5,325 kilograms (11,740 lb)
- BOL mass: 3,200 kilograms (7,100 lb)
- Power: 14kW

Start of mission
- Launch date: 2 October 2015
- Rocket: Atlas V 421 (AV-059)

Orbital parameters
- Longitude: 113° W

Transponders
- Band: L band and K_{u} band

The Morelos satellites are a series of Mexican communications satellites. The first two operated between 1985 and 1998 and provided telephony, data, and television services over the territory of the Mexican Republic and adjacent areas. The third is now part of the MEXSAT constellation (sister ship of the MEXSAT-1 lost during launch) but carries the Morelos name.

The original Morelos satellites were replaced by the Solidaridad Satellite System (Solidaridad I, launched 17 November 1993, and Solidaridad 2, launched 17 October 1994) and, following privatisation, by the Satmex Satellite System.

== Satellites ==
=== Morelos I ===
Morelos I was Mexico's first communications satellite. It was built and put into orbit under a contract from the Secretariat of Communications and Transport (SCT), the federal ministry responsible for the nation's communications systems. Morelos I, a Hughes Aircraft Corporation HS-376, was launched by the U.S. Space Shuttle Discovery (mission STS-51-G) on 17 June 1985 and entered geostationary orbit at 113° W on 17 December 1985.

=== Morelos II ===
Morelos II was launched in November 1985 and remained in service until July 1998. Built by the Hughes Aircraft Corporation for the SCT, it was launched by the Space Shuttle Atlantis on 27 November 1985; the mission, STS-61-B, included Mexican-born astronaut Rodolfo Neri Vela as a payload specialist in its crew. Morelos II held a geostationary orbit at 116.8° W.

=== Morelos III ===
Morelos III (originally MEXSAT 2) was launched on 2 October 2015 at 10:28 UTC on Atlas V 421 AV-059 and the 100th launch by the United Launch Alliance. The spacecraft is designed to provide L-band services to mobile 3G+ users and armed forces via a deployable 22m Herschelian antenna dish with RF transceivers. It also has a 2m Ku-band dish of fixed geometry with a much simpler deployment sequence. The spacecraft is a Boeing 702HP GeoMobile spacecraft bus equipped with an RD-4 main engine for completing its ascent to geostationary orbit at 113° W from an ascent orbit of 4750 by 35800km inclined at 27° following the now-typical long duration two-burn profile of the Atlas V. It was originally intended to serve with the similar MEXSAT-1 Centenario spacecraft (which would have been at 116° W) lost during the 3rd stage failure of the 406th Proton, a launch vehicle of Proton-M/Briz-M configuration.

== Gallery ==
Morelos Satellite System
(Photo credit: NASA)
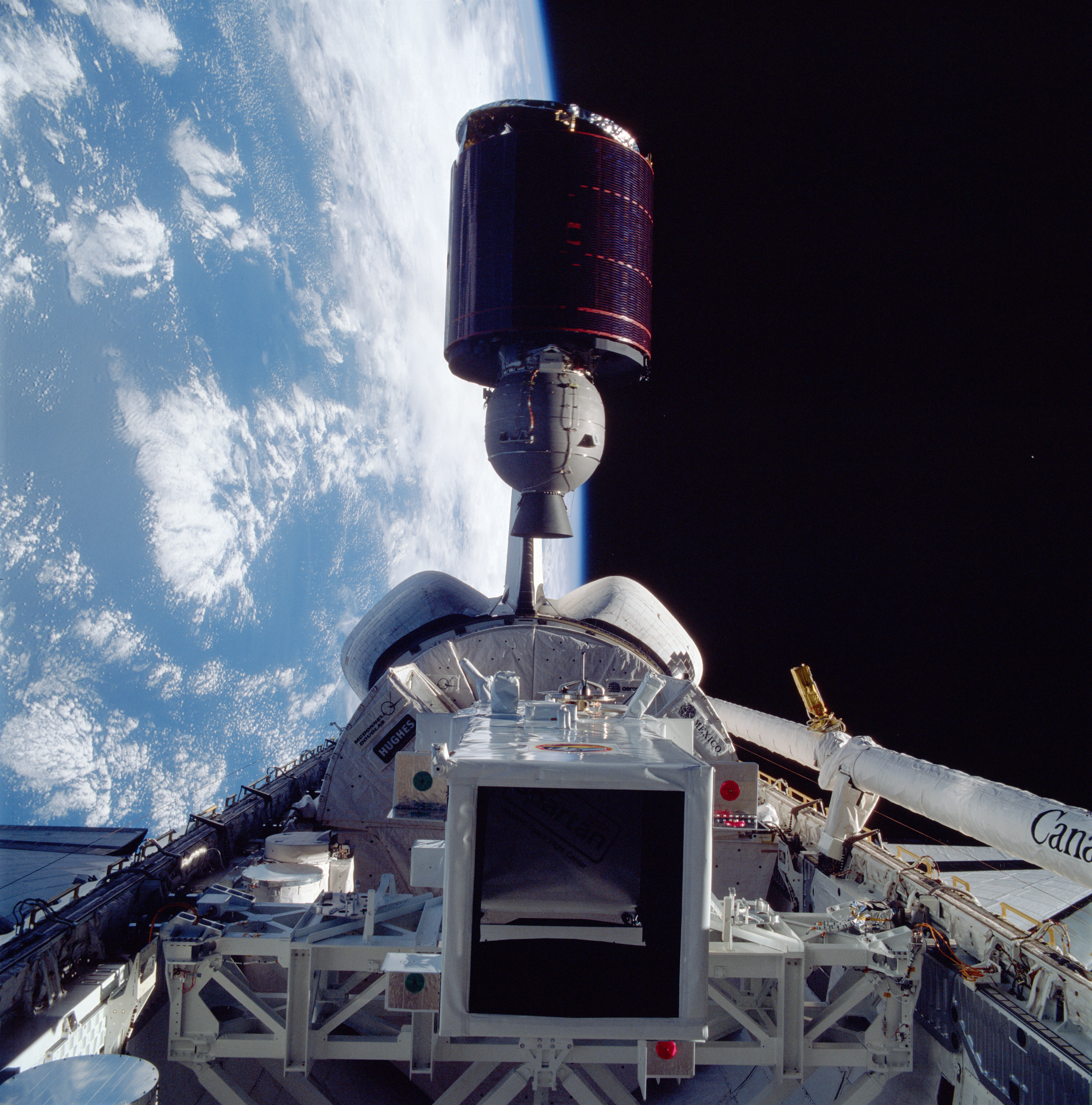
Deployment of Morelos I

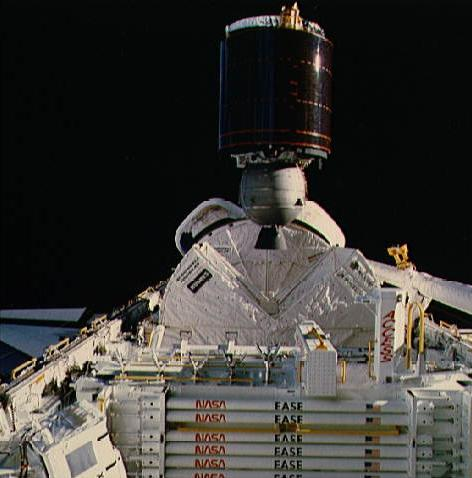
Deployment of Morelos II

== See also ==
- 1985 in spaceflight
- Satmex
- Telecommunications in Mexico
- Mexsat
