= Thaicom 5 =

Thai satellite

THAICOM 5
- Mission type: Communication
- Operator: Thaicom
- COSPAR ID: 2006-020B
- SATCAT no.: 29163
- Mission duration: 12 years (planned)

Spacecraft properties
- Bus: Spacebus 3000A
- Manufacturer: Alcatel Alenia Space
- Launch mass: 2,800 kilograms (6,200 lb)

Start of mission
- Launch date: 27 May 2006, 21:09 UTC
- Rocket: Ariane 5ECA
- Launch site: Kourou ELA-3
- Contractor: Arianespace

End of mission
- Disposal: Decommissioned
- Deactivated: 26 February 2020, 09:52 UTC

Orbital parameters
- Reference system: Geocentric
- Regime: Geostationary now graveyard orbit
- Longitude: 78.5° East
- Perigee altitude: 35,777 kilometres (22,231 mi)
- Apogee altitude: 35,796 kilometres (22,243 mi)
- Inclination: 0 degrees
- Period: 24 hours
- Epoch: 27 May 2006, 17:09:00 UTC

Transponders
- Band: 25 C band 14 K_{u} band

Thaicom 5 was a geostationary communications satellite operated by Thaicom. It was used to provide communications services to Asia, Africa, Middle East, Americas, Europe and Australia.

== Overview ==
Thaicom 5 was constructed by Alcatel Alenia Space, and is based on the Spacebus 3000A satellite bus, with a configuration identical to the Thaicom 3 satellite which it replaced. It was originally ordered as Thaicom 4, but sold to Agrani as Agrani 2 before completion. It was completed in 1997, and stored until June 2005 when it was cancelled and sold back to Thaicom. It was equipped with 25 G/H band (IEEE C band) and 14 J band (IEEE K_{u} band) transponders, and at launch it had a mass of 2,800 kilograms (6,200 lb), with an expected operational lifespan of 12 years.

Thaicom 5 began experiencing technical difficulties in December 2019, causing Thaicom to duplicate some channels, including Korean Central Television, to neighboring satellites.

== Launch ==
The satellite was launched on an Ariane 5ECA carrier rocket, contracted by Arianespace, flying from ELA-3 at the Guiana Space Centre. The launch occurred at 21:09 UTC on 27 May 2006, and placed Thaicom 5, along with the Mexican Satmex 6 spacecraft, into geosynchronous transfer orbit. At the time, it was the heaviest dual-satellite payload ever launched into geosynchronous transfer orbit, however, this record has since been broken.

Following launch, Thaicom 5 raised itself into geostationary orbit using an S400 engine, with insertion occurring on 3 June 2006. It underwent on-orbit testing, and was positioned at a longitude of 78.5° East for operational service, where it replaced the failing Thaicom 3 satellite. On 2 October 2006, after Thaicom 5 had become operational, Thaicom 3 was moved to a graveyard orbit.

== See also ==
- Thaicom 4
- Thaicom 6
- Thaicom 8
