= Telkom-2 =

Indonesian communications satellite

- Mission type: Communications
- Operator: PT Telkom
- COSPAR ID: 2005-046A
- SATCAT no.: 28902
- Website: https://www.telkom.co.id/sites
- Mission duration: 15 years (planned); 15 years, 6 months and 19 days (final)

Spacecraft properties
- Spacecraft: Telkom-2
- Spacecraft type: Star-2
- Bus: GEOStar-2
- Manufacturer: Orbital Sciences Corporation
- Launch mass: 1,975 kg (4,354 lb)
- Dry mass: 899 kg (1,982 lb)
- Dimensions: 2.4 m x 3.3 m x 1.9 m Span on orbit: 12.6 m
- Power: 2.918 kW

Start of mission
- Launch date: 16 November 2005, 23:46:00 UTC
- Rocket: Ariane 5ECA (V167)
- Launch site: Centre Spatial Guyanais, Kourou, ELA-3
- Contractor: Arianespace
- Entered service: January 2006

End of mission
- Disposal: Graveyard orbit
- Deactivated: 4 June 2021

Orbital parameters
- Reference system: Geocentric orbit
- Regime: Geostationary orbit
- Longitude: 118° East; 157° East

Transponders
- Band: 24 C-band
- Coverage area: Indonesia, Southeast Asia, Indian subcontinent

Telkom-2 was a geosynchronous communications satellite built by Orbital Sciences Corporation (OSC) for Indonesia's state-owned telecommunications company, PT Telekomunikasi Indonesia Tbk (PT Telkom). Telkom-2 was successfully launched on 16 November 2005, at 23:46:00 UTC and positioned in geostationary orbit, at 118° East for replaced Palapa-B4.

== History ==
Based on Orbital's highly successful and flight-proven STAR-2 satellite bus, Telkom-2 featured state-of-the-art communications satellite technology, and 24 C-band transponders. The new spacecraft replaced PT Telkom's on-orbit Palapa-B4 satellite, improved communications coverage across Indonesia, and allowed PT Telkom to expand its coverage area into southeast Asia and the Indian subcontinent. Orbital also supplemented Telkom's existing ground station, and offered extensive mission operations support. There were several postponements prior to Telkom-2's launch. Three launch delays happened in November 2005 due to technical problems with the Ariane 5 launch vehicle. Multiple delayed took place between November 2004 and October 2005 due to different problems including technical problems with the satellite. Orbital's contract with PT Telkom included an optional order for another geostationary satellite. Telkom-2 was finally launched on 16 November 2005.

Telkom-2 successfully operated for 15 years. The satellite was retired and placed into a graveyard orbit in June 2021.

Specification of Telkom-2 satellite:

- Owner: PT Telkomunikasi Indonesia Tbk (PT Telkom)
- Mission: C-band communications for Indonesia
- Performance: Repeater - two groups of 15-for-12 linearized traveling-wave tube assemblies (TWTA)
- Transponders Power - 39 watts RF
- Stabilization - three-axis, zero momentum
- Redundancy: Full dual string
- Solar arrays: 2 panel wings with improved triple-junction GaAs cells
- Propulsion: Liquid bi-propellant transfer orbit system; monopropellant (hydrazine) on-orbit
- Repeater: Two groups of 15-for-12 linear traveling wave tube assemblies (TWTAs)
- Antenna: Two 2.0 m (6.6 ft) dual-griddled shaped-beam reflectors

== Also ==
- Article Satelit Telkom-2 telah Diluncurkan, internet: https://web.archive.org/web/20070623104954/http://pribadi.or.id/diary/2005/11/17/satelit-telkom-2-telah-diluncurkan/
