= Thor 5 =

Communications satellite

Thor 5 (Thor 2R)
- Mission type: Communication
- Operator: Telenor
- COSPAR ID: 2008-006A
- SATCAT no.: 32487

Spacecraft properties
- Bus: STAR-2
- Manufacturer: Orbital Sciences Corporation
- Launch mass: 1,960 kilograms (4,320 lb)
- Power: 3,600 watts from solar panels

Start of mission
- Launch date: 11 February 2008, 11:34 UTC
- Rocket: Proton-M/Briz-M
- Launch site: Baikonur 200/39
- Contractor: ILS

Orbital parameters
- Reference system: Geocentric
- Regime: Geostationary
- Perigee altitude: 35,780 kilometres (22,230 mi)
- Apogee altitude: 35,780 kilometres (22,230 mi)
- Inclination: 0 degrees
- Period: 24 hours

Thor 5, also known as Thor 2R, is a Norwegian communications satellite. It was successfully launched for Telenor atop an International Launch Services Proton-M/Briz-M carrier rocket, at 11:34 GMT on 11 February 2008. It is based on the STAR-2 satellite bus, and was constructed by Orbital Sciences Corporation. It carries 24 K_{u} band transponders, to provide direct-to-home television broadcasting. After launch, the Briz-M upper stage placed Thor 5 directly into a geosynchronous orbit, eliminating the need for orbital raising manoeuvres and making the spacecraft able to save weight by carrying less fuel. It is positioned at a longitude of 1° West.
