= Thaicom 4 =

Thai satellite

Coordinates: 0°0′N 119.5°0′E

THAICOM 4, also known as IPSTAR 1, is a high throughput satellite built by Space Systems/Loral (SS/L) for Thaicom Public Company Limited. It was launched on August 11, 2005, from the European Space Agency's spaceport in French Guiana on board the Ariane rocket. The satellite had a launch mass of 6486 kilograms and is from SS/L's LS-1300 series of spacecraft.

IPSTAR 1 is the world's first High Throughput Satellite capable of providing service to up to two million broadband users or nearly 30 million mobile phone subscribers in the Asia Pacific region. Compared to the one or two gigabit per second (Gbit/s) capacity of a typical satellite designed for Fixed Satellite Services (FSS), IPSTAR was designed to provide broadband Internet service. Its 45 Gbit/s of capacity had never been achieved on a satellite before, enabling IPSTAR to provide up to 6 Mbit/s user download and up to 4 Mbit/s upload speeds for a variety of applications and services.

== Technology ==
The satellite's 45 Gbit/s bandwidth capacity, in combination with its platform's ability to provide an immediately available, high-capacity ground network with affordable bandwidth, allows for rapid deployment and flexible service locations within its footprint. The IPSTAR broadband satellite system is composed of a gateway earth station communicating over the satellite to provide broadband packet-switched communications to a large number of small terminals with network star configuration.

A wide-band data link from the gateway to the user terminal employs an Orthogonal Frequency Division Multiplexing (OFDM) with a Time Division Multiplex (TDM) overlay. These forward channels employ highly efficient transmission methods, including Turbo Product Code (TPC) and higher order modulation (L-codes) for increased system performance.

In the terminal-to-gateway direction (or return link), the narrow-band channels employ the same efficient transmission methods. These narrow-band channels operate in different multiple-access modes based on bandwidth-usage behavior, including ALOHA and TDMA for STAR return link waveform.

Traditional satellite technology utilizes a broad single beam to cover entire continents and regions. With the introduction of multiple narrowly focused spot beams and frequency reuse, IPSTAR is capable of maximizing the available frequency for transmissions. Increasing bandwidth by a factor of twenty compared to traditional Ku-band satellites translates into better efficiencies. Despite the higher costs associated with spot beam technology, the overall cost per circuit is considerably lower as compared to shaped beam technology.

IPSTAR's Dynamic Power Allocation optimizes the use of power among beams and allocates a power reserve of 20 percent to be allocated to beams that may be affected by rain fade, thus maintaining the link.

== See also ==
- Thaicom
- Thaicom 5
- Thaicom 6
- Thaicom 8
