= Intelsat 11 =

Communications satellite

- Mission type: Communications
- Operator: Intelsat
- COSPAR ID: 2007-044B
- SATCAT no.: 32253
- Mission duration: 15 years (planned)

Spacecraft properties
- Bus: STAR-2
- Manufacturer: Orbital Sciences
- Launch mass: 2491 kg

Start of mission
- Launch date: 5 October 2007, 22:02 UTC
- Rocket: Ariane 5 GS
- Launch site: Kourou, ELA-3
- Contractor: Arianespace

Orbital parameters
- Reference system: Geocentric orbit
- Regime: Geostationary orbit
- Longitude: 43.0° West

Transponders
- Band: 16 C-band; 18 Ku-band
- Bandwidth: 36 MHz
- Coverage area: Americas and Europe

Intelsat 11 is a communications satellite owned by Intelsat and located at 43.0° West longitude, serving the Americas market. Intelsat 11 replaced Intelsat 3R which was nearing the end of its design life. Intelsat 11 was built by Orbital Sciences Corporation, as part of its STAR-2 line. Intelsat 11 was formerly known as PAS-11. It was launched 5 October 2007 by an Ariane 5 GS.

Intelsat 11 is designed to deliver C-band services to Intelsat's customers in the continental United States and also serve as DirecTV Latin America's Ku-band downlink for coverage of Brazil. Intelsat 11 is designed to assume the responsibilities of current customers for Intelsat 3R.

In February 2023, Intelsat announced its intent to move Intelsat 11 to a backup satellite asset and allowing the satellite to drift to an inclined geosynchronous orbit with eventual intent to retire it to a graveyard orbit.
