= Mexican Satellite System =

Mexican Satellite System (MEXSAT)
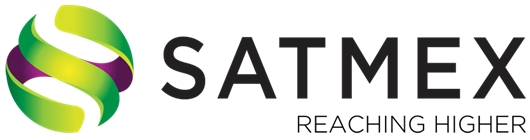
- Formation: 2010
- Founder: Ministry of Communications and Transportation
- Founded at: Mexico
- Type: Public
- Services: Satellite communication systems

The Mexican Satellite System, also known as MEXSAT, is a network of three satellites bought by the Mexican government's Ministry of Communications and Transportation. The three satellites are named Mexsat-1, Mexsat-2, and Mexsat-3. Subsequently, they have also been named Centenario, Morelos III and Bicentenario respectively.

Mexsat-1 and Mexsat-2 are twin satellites for mobile communication devices and will operate in the electromagnetic frequencies of the L and K_{u} bands. Mexsat-3 will operate in the range of the extended C and K_{u} bands. Together these three satellites will form the whole system, operated by the Ministry of Communications and Transportation. The system is expected to meet the telecommunications needs of the whole country.

Two control centres have been built in Hermosillo from which the new satellites will be operated. They were inaugurated by the then-president Felipe Calderón on 29 November 2012.

== History ==
On 20 August 2009, the National Security Program of Mexico announced the MEXSAT project as a means by which to preserve security in Mexico. It is developed by the Ministry of Communications and Transportation and on 17 December 2010 in New York City, United States of America, the Federal Government signed a contract for the acquisition of the MEXSAT system by Boeing Satellite Systems International, Inc.

On 28 June 2011 a contract is signed with Arianespace SA, who will provide the launch services for Mexsat-3.

On 6 February 2012 a contract is signed with International Launch Services (ILS) to provide the launch services for Mexsat-1.

In April 2012 the government renames the satellites from Mexsat-1, 2 and 3 to Centenario, Morelos III and Bicentenario.

== Mexsat-1 ==
The first of the three satellites which formed the MEXSAT system was Centenario (originally Mexsat-1), named to commemorate the centenary of the beginning of the Mexican Revolution. It was a Boeing 702HP communications satellite completed in November 2013. It was equipped with an L band reflector and a K_{u} band antenna. It had an estimated lifespan of 15 years.

The satellite was launched on an ILS Proton-M rocket on 16 May 2015. However, 490 seconds after lift-off a technical failure in the third stage of the craft caused the destruction of the satellite, which burned up in the atmosphere and fell into Siberia.

== Mexsat-2 ==
The second satellite, Morelos III (originally Mexsat-2) was due to be launched in the last quarter of 2014 but was held back. It instead was launched on October 2, 2015, aboard a United Launch Alliance Atlas V. It is identical in design and function to Mexsat-1, in that it is a Boeing 702HP fitted with the same equipment. It was the second satellite in the network to achieve orbit. It is named after a previous Mexican Satellite Network, Morelos Satellite System.

== Mexsat-3 ==
The third satellite, Bicentenario (originally Mexsat-3), is so named to commemorate the bicentennial of Mexican Independence. Instead of being a Boeing 702Hp like its counterparts, Mexsat-3 is instead a GEOStar-2 manufactured by Orbital Sciences Corporation. It was launched on 19 December 2012 from a base in Kourou, French Guiana, becoming the first satellite in the network to achieve orbit (contrary to its name).
