= Federal Commission of Telecommunications (Mexico) =

The Federal Commission of Telecommunications (Comisión Federal de Telecomunicaciones) (CoFeTel) was the regulator of telecommunications in Mexico, and was part of the Mexico's Secretariat of Communications and Transport (SCT). Formed in 1996 and replaced in 2013, Cofetel was roughly equivalent to the Federal Communications Commission in the United States, and Ofcom in the United Kingdom. Among its duties were licensing of broadcasting stations and regulation of telephone companies.

As of September 2013 COFETEL has been replaced by the IFT, the Federal Telecommunications Institute.
