= Superbird-C2 =

Communications satellite

- Names: Superbird-7
- Mission type: Communications
- Operator: JSAT
- COSPAR ID: 2008-038A
- SATCAT no.: 33274
- Mission duration: 15 years (planned)

Spacecraft properties
- Spacecraft: Superbird-7
- Spacecraft type: Superbird
- Bus: DS2000
- Manufacturer: Mitsubishi Electric
- Launch mass: 4,820 kg (10,630 lb)
- Dry mass: 2,018 kg (4,449 lb)

Start of mission
- Launch date: 14 August 2008, 20:44 UTC
- Rocket: Ariane 5 ECA (V185)
- Launch site: Centre Spatial Guyanais, ELA-3
- Contractor: Arianespace
- Entered service: 17 October 2008

Orbital parameters
- Reference system: Geocentric orbit
- Regime: Geostationary orbit
- Longitude: 144° East

Transponders
- Band: 20 Ku-band × 27 MHz + 8 Ku-band × 36 MHz
- Bandwidth: 828 MHz
- Coverage area: Japan, East Asia, Pacific Ocean
- TWTA power: 100 watts

Superbird-C2, known as Superbird-7 before launch, is a geostationary communications satellite operated by JSAT Corporation and designed and manufactured by Mitsubishi Electric (MELCO) on the DS2000 satellite bus. It had a launch weight of 4,820 kg (10,630 lb), a 15-year design life and was the first commercial communications satellite built in Japan. Its payload is composed of 28 Ku-band transponders with a total bandwidth of 828 MHz.

It was originally ordered by Space Communications Corporation (SCC), owned by the Mitsubishi Group keiretsu, also the parent company of MELCO, but it was later merged and absorbed by JSAT Corporation. By the time of the actual launch it was a fully used Superbird-C2 as a replacement for Superbird-C to provide communications services to Japan, East Asia and the Pacific Ocean.

== History ==
In April 2005, Space Communications Corporation (SCC) issued an Request for proposal (RFP) for Superbird-7, a spacecraft destined to replace the aging Superbird-C. On 28 June 2005, Mitsubishi Electric (MELCO) got first contract negotiations right, and on31 October 2005, SCC and MELCO successfully concluded the contract negotiation. On 1 November 2005, SCC makes the orders to MELCO official for the first commercial communications satellite to be built in Japan, the Superbird-7. The contract called for on orbit delivery, with MELCO handling every detail from construction to launch procurement and on orbit testing for final hand over to the customer. It was not only the first SCC order for a commercial communications satellite built in Japan, but the first such order ever. This event meant that MELCO officially entered the market.

Superbird-7 was expected to weight around 5,000 kg (11,000 lb), have 28 Ku-band transponders, a design life of 15 years and be launched on the first quarter of 2008. It was going to be renamed as Superbird-C2 once in orbit and be stationed on the 144° East where it would replace the aging Superbird-C. It was expected to offer its services in Japan, Eastern Asia and the Pacific Ocean.

In March 2008, SCC becomes a fully owned subsidiary of SKY Perfect JSAT Group. On the SKY Perfect JSAT board meeting of 6 August 2008, it was resolved to merge SKY Perfect Communications, JSAT Corporation and Space Communications Corporation. The merger would see SKY Perfect absorb JSAT and SCC and both legacy companies dissolved. Thus, by the time of launch, Superbird-7 was a JSAT spacecraft.

Superbird-7 was successfully launched along AMC-21 by an Ariane 5 ECA on 14 August 2008, at 20:44 UTC. It separated from the spacecraft at 21:09 UTC and less than an hour later, at 22:03 UTC, it had already spread its solar panels. After the successful launch, Superbird-7 was renamed as Superbird-C2.

On 17 October 2008, MELCO announced that they had performed the final handover of the spacecraft to JSAT. They had performed all orbital maneuvers to its correct orbital slot on the 144° East position, had completed the on-orbit tests and performed the necessary acceptance tests. This concluded the commission phase and the spacecraft was put into service.

On 1 August 2012, JSAT and Panasonic Avionics Corporation announced an agreement for under which Panasonic would commit to use the Superbird-C2 beams for its eXConnect in-flight Internet connectivity service in South East Asia.

== See also ==
- DS2000 – The satellite bus on which Superbird-C2 is based
- SKY PerfecTV! – Satellite TV division of the same owner corporation and major user of Superbird-C2
