= AMC-21 =

American communications satellite

- Names: GE-21; Americom-21
- Mission type: Communications
- Operator: SES Americom (2008–2009); SES World Skies (2009–2011); SES (2011-present)
- COSPAR ID: 2008-038B
- SATCAT no.: 33275
- Mission duration: 15 years (planned); 17 years, 6 months, 19 days (elapsed)

Spacecraft properties
- Spacecraft: GE-21
- Bus: STAR-2
- Manufacturer: Thales Alenia Space (prime); Orbital Sciences (bus)
- Launch mass: 2,473 kg (5,452 lb)
- Dry mass: 1,161 kg (2,560 lb)
- Power: 4.4 kW

Start of mission
- Launch date: 14 August 2008, 20:44 UTC
- Rocket: Ariane 5 ECA
- Launch site: Centre Spatial Guyanais, ELA-3
- Contractor: Arianespace
- Entered service: September 2008

Orbital parameters
- Reference system: Geocentric orbit
- Regime: Geostationary orbit
- Longitude: 125° West

Transponders
- Band: 24 Ku-band
- Bandwidth: 36 MHz
- Coverage area: Canada, United States, Mexico, Caribbean, Central America

AMC-21, or GE-21, is an American communications satellite operated by SES S.A., formerly SES World Skies and SES Americom. It was launched in August 2008 and is expected to remain in service for approximately 15 years. It is currently located at 125° West longitude.

== Spacecraft and mission design ==
AMC-21 is based on a STAR-2 satellite bus that provides 4.4 kilowatts of power for the communications payload. The platform will support a 15-year on-orbit mission life. It carries 24 Ku-band transponders at 36 MHz, which will be used to broadcast television signals to Canada, United States, Mexico, the Caribbean, and Central America.

== Manufacture ==
Thales Alenia Space was the prime contractor for AMC-21, and provided the satellite's communications payload. The STAR-2 bus was subcontracted to Orbital Sciences Corporation, as were integration and testing of the satellite. As prime contractor, Thales Alenia Space delivered the completed satellite to SES Americom.

== Launch ==
AMC-21 was launched, along with the Superbird-7 satellite, by an Ariane 5 ECA launch vehicle on 14 August 2008 at 20:44 UTC. The satellite separated from the launch vehicle in a geosynchronous transfer orbit (GTO). An onboard IHI-500 N (IHI-BT4) engine then raised it to an operational geostationary orbit and placed it at a longitude of 125° West of the Greenwich Meridian. After successful completion of in-orbit testing, SES Americom took operational control of AMC-21 in September 2008.

== Mergers and acquisitions ==
In September 2009, SES Americom merged with SES New Skies to form SES World Skies, to which all of its operational satellites, including AMC-21, were transferred.
