= MEASAT-3a =

Malaysian communications satellite

- Mission type: Communication
- Operator: MEASAT Satellite Systems
- COSPAR ID: 2009-032A
- SATCAT no.: 35362

Spacecraft properties
- Bus: STAR-2
- Manufacturer: OSC

Start of mission
- Launch date: 21 June 2009, 21:50 UTC
- Rocket: Zenit-3SLB
- Launch site: Baikonur 45/1
- Contractor: Land Launch

Orbital parameters
- Reference system: Geocentric
- Regime: Geostationary
- Longitude: 160.0° East

MEASAT-3a is a communications satellite which MEASAT Satellite Systems intends to operate in geosynchronous orbit at 91.5 degrees but has now been moved to 160 Degrees to serve abc and SBS channels. It was built by Orbital Sciences Corporation, based on the STAR-2 spacecraft platform.

== History ==
Orbital completed the satellite and all of its contractual requirements, and shipped the satellite to its Baikonur, Kazakhstan launch site in July 2008. The satellite was mated to the Block DM upper stage of the Zenit-3SLB rocket when it was struck by the operator cab of the overhead crane. The hazardous propellants were successfully offloaded and the spacecraft was decontaminated and returned to the United States for repair work and additional testing, with a projected launch date of Spring/Summer 2009.

== Launch ==
MEASAT-3a was successfully launched aboard a Land Launch Zenit-3SLB carrier rocket flying from Site 45/1 at the Baikonur Cosmodrome. The launch occurred at 21:50 GMT on 21 June 2009, with the spacecraft separating from the Block DM-SLB upper stage of the rocket around six hours later.
