= Gulf Space Technology =

Thai company

Gulf Space Technology Public Company Limited is a Thai satellite operator and provider of satellite and telecommunication services since 1991. The company operates a fleet of four satellites covering Asia, Oceania, and Africa. Thaicom is a subsidiary of Intouch Holdings PCL, Thailand's biggest telecommunications conglomerate.

== History ==
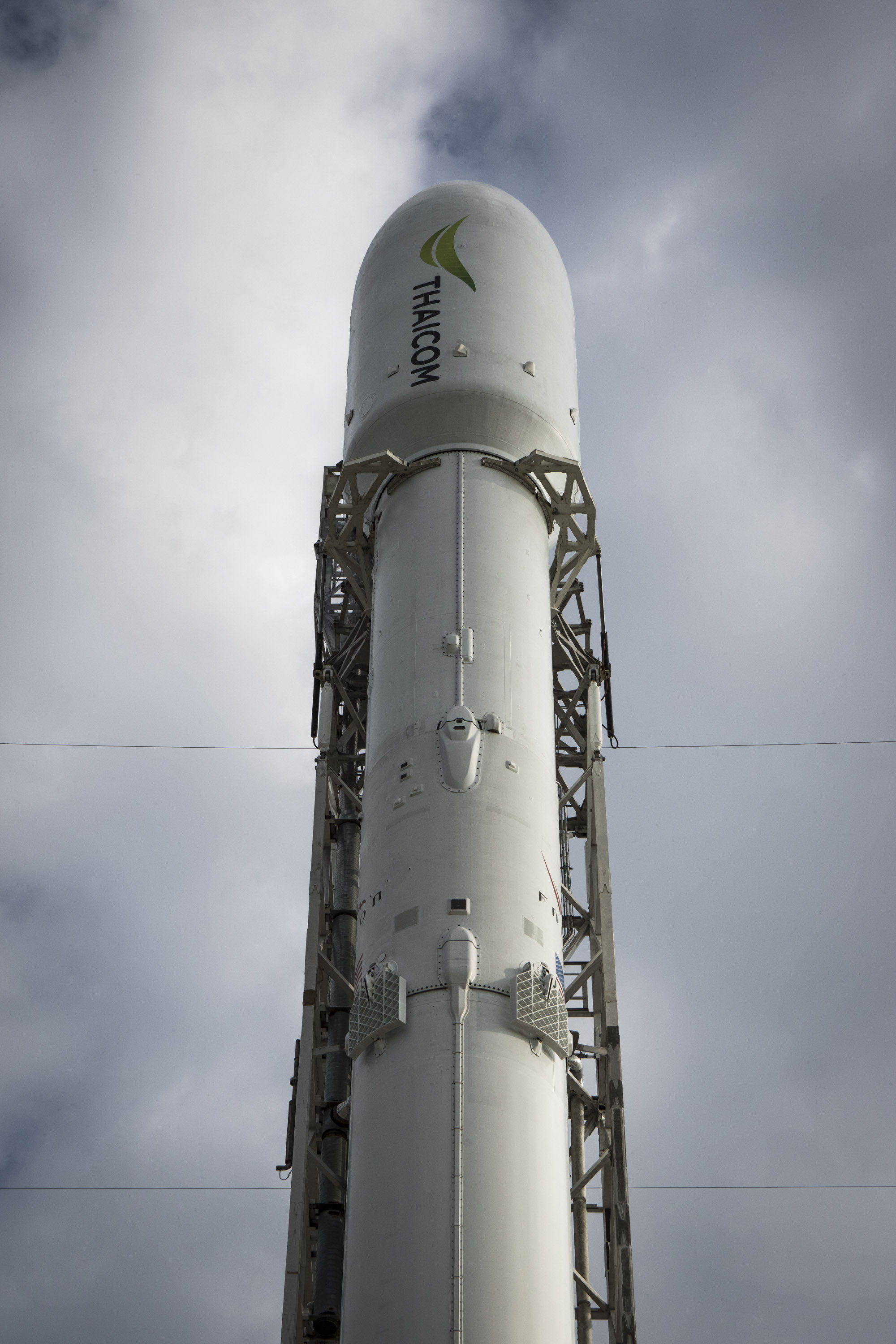
Falcon 9 vertical with THAICOM 8 satellite

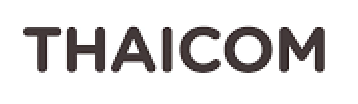
Thaicom Company Logo

The company's satellite project was named Thaicom by King Bhumibol.

Thailand-based Shinawatra Computer and Communications Co. Ltd. (later Intouch Holdings PLC) signed a US$100 million contract with Hughes Space and Communications Company Ltd. in 1991 to build Thailand's first communications satellite. Thaicom 1 was launched on 18 December 1993, carrying 12 C-band transponders and covering an area from Japan to Singapore.

The company became a listed company on the Stock Exchange of Thailand on 18 January 1994, and is officially traded under the symbol THCOM.

Since its establishment, the company has expanded its business activities to include Internet and telephone services, as well as direct to home (DTH) satellite TV services. As of 31 December 2011, Intouch, which is the company's major shareholder, holds 41.14% of the company's shares.

Thaicom operates four satellites. The company also operates satellite ground facilities, including its satellite control center in Mueang Nonthaburi District, Nonthaburi Province, Thailand, and a teleport and DTH center in Lat Lum Kaeo District, Pathum Thani Province, Thailand.

In September 2025, Deutsche Bank and Standard Chartered announced that they would grant a $184 million loan to STI for the development of the Thaicom 10.

In 17 September 2026, the company has changed the name to Gulf Space Technology Public Company Limited

== Launch history ==
Thaicom satellites
Satellite	Manufacturer	Launch Date (UTC)	Rocket	Launch Site	Contractor	Longitude	Status	References
Thaicom 1	Hughes Space Aircraft	18 December 1993	(European Union) Ariane 4 (44L)	(France) Kourou ELA-2	(France) Arianespace	78.5° East (now 120° East)	Decommissioned	
Thaicom 2	Hughes Space Aircraft	8 October 1994	(European Union) Ariane 4 (44L)	(France) Kourou ELA-2	(France) Arianespace	78.5° East	Decommissioned	
Thaicom 3	Aérospatiale, later Thales Alenia Space	16 April 1997	(European Union) Ariane 4 (44LP)	(France) Kourou ELA-2	(France) Arianespace	78.5° East	Decommissioned (Deorbited: 2 October 2006)	
Thaicom 4 (IPSTAR)	Space Systems/Loral, USA	11 August 2005	(European Union) Ariane 5 EGS	(France) Kourou ELA-3	(France) Arianespace	119.5° East	In Service	
Thaicom 5	Alcatel Alenia Space, France	27 May 2006	(European Union) Ariane 5 ECA	(France) Kourou ELA-3	(France) Arianespace	78.5° East	Decommissioned	
Thaicom 6	Orbital Sciences Corporation	6 January 2014	(United States) Falcon 9 v1.1	(United States) Cape Canaveral SLC-40	(United States) SpaceX	78.5° East	In Service	
Thaicom 7 (AsiaSat 6)	Space Systems/Loral, USA	7 September 2014	(United States) Falcon 9 v1.1	(United States) Cape Canaveral SLC-40	(United States) SpaceX	120° East	In Service	
Thaicom 8	Orbital ATK	27 May 2016	(United States) Falcon 9 FT	(United States) Cape Canaveral SLC-40	(United States) SpaceX	78.5° East	In Service	
Thaicom 9			(United States) Falcon 9		(United States) SpaceX			
Thaicom 10								

== DTV Networks (Thailand) ==
DTV Television Network
- ISIN: TH0380010Y07
- Industry: Television broadcasting
- Founded: 2008
- Area served: Thailand and Cambodia
- Parent: Thaicom; DTV Services Ltd (Thailand)
- Website: www.thaicom.net

The DTV Television Network is a major television broadcasting operated by Thaicom.
