= N-STAR c =

Geostationary communications satellite

- Mission type: Mobile communications
- Operator: SKY Perfect JSAT Group
- COSPAR ID: 2002-035B
- SATCAT no.: 27461
- Mission duration: 15 years (planned)

Spacecraft properties
- Spacecraft: N-STAR c
- Bus: GEOStar-2
- Manufacturer: Lockheed Martin / Orbital Sciences Corporation
- Launch mass: 1,645 kg (3,627 lb)
- Dimensions: 3.3 m × 1.9 m × 1.5 m (10.8 ft × 6.2 ft × 4.9 ft) (stowed)
- Power: 2.6 kW

Start of mission
- Launch date: 5 July 2002, 23:22:00 UTC
- Rocket: Ariane 5G (V153)
- Launch site: Centre Spatial Guyanais, ELA-3
- Contractor: Arianespace
- Entered service: August 2002

Orbital parameters
- Reference system: Geocentric orbit
- Regime: Geostationary orbit
- Longitude: 136° East

Transponders
- Band: 1 C-band; 20 S-band
- Coverage area: Japan

N-STAR c, is a geostationary communications satellite originally ordered by NTT DoCoMo and later fully acquired by SKY Perfect JSAT Group. It was designed and manufactured by Lockheed Martin, which acted as prime, developed the payload and did the final integration and testing, and Orbital Sciences Corporation, which supplied the satellite bus on the GEOStar-2 platform and procured the launch services. It had a launch weight of approximately 1,645 kg (3,627 lb), and a 15-year design life. Its payload is composed of 1 C-band, and 20 S-band transponders and its stationed in the 136° East longitude.

== Satellite description ==
N-STAR c is a 3 axis stabilized geostationary communications satellite based on the GEOStar-2 satellite bus. While its payload was developed by Lockheed Martin, who also did final integration, the satellite bus was supplied by Orbital Sciences Corporation (now Lockheed Martin). N-STAR c was the first order for the GEOStar-2 (then called STAR-2) platform, and Orbital Sciences supplied it fully integrated and tested to Lockheed Martin.

It weighed 1,645 kg (3,627 lb) at launch, and while the design life was of 15 years. Stowed for launch it measured 3.3 m × 1.9 m × 1.5 m (10.8 ft × 6.2 ft × 4.9 ft). It had a power availability dedicated to the payload of 1.4 kW, thanks to its multi-junction GaAs solar cells that produced 2.6 kW at the beginning of its operative life and spanned 12.6 m (41 ft) when deployed. The satellite used a bipropellant propulsion system for orbit circularization, station keeping and attitude control, with enough propellant for 15 years.

Its payload was designed and manufactured by Lokheed Martin. It is composed of an unfurlable 5.1 m (17 ft) antenna fed by 20 S-band and 1 C-band transponders. With the S-band part supplying end user mobile communication services and the C-band acting as the feeder channel. The S-band transponders have a solid-state amplifiers power of 288 watts. It is arranged in three groups of four plus one spare amplifiers of 24 watts each. The transponders work on the 2.5 GHz to 2.6 GHz frequency. The C-band transponder is powered by one plus one spare 13 watts solid state amplifier and works on the 4 GHz and 6 GHz frequency band.

== History ==
N-Star was created as a joint venture between JSAT Corporation, Nippon Telegraph and Telephone (NTT), NTT Communications and NTT DoCoMo for the supply of these latter two WIDESTAR satellite telephone and data packet service. JSAT would handle the satellite side of business and NTT DoCoMo would operate the payload.

In October 1999, N-STAR c was ordered by NTT DoCoMo from Lockheed Martin and Orbital Sciences Corporation. Orbital Sciences would supply the spacecraft and procure launch services and Lockheed Martin would deliver the payload an act a main contractor. It was the first satellite ordered to use the GEOStar-2 satellite bus from Orbital Sciences.

On 5 July 2002 at 23:22:00 UTC and Ariane 5G successfully launched N-STAR c along Stellat 5. On 12 September 2002, Orbital Sciences announced the successful on-orbit delivery of N-STAR c to its client, NTT DoCoMo, during late August 2002.

During 2010, SKY Perfect JSAT Corporation acquires N-STAR c, completing the transfer of NTT orbital assets and management to JSAT. The same year the WIDESTAR II service was enabled for all of Japan, using N-STAR c and JCSAT-5A, also known as N-STAR d.

== See also ==
- JCSAT-5A – Also known as N-STAR d, was the follow on satellite.
