= Orbital Sciences Corporation =

American aerospace company (1982-2015)

- Type: Public
- Traded as: NYSE: ORB
- Industry: Space, Defense
- Founded: 1982; 44 years ago in Vienna, Virginia
- Founders: David W. Thompson; Bruce W. Ferguson; Scott L. Webster
- Defunct: February 9, 2015; 11 years ago
- Fate: Merged with Alliant Techsystems to form Orbital ATK
- Headquarters: Dulles, Virginia, United States
- Key people: David W. Thompson (Chairman, President and CEO)
- Revenue: ▼US$1,365 million (2013)
- Operating income: ▲US$113 million (2013)
- Net income: ▲US$68 million (2013)
- Total assets: ▲US$1,284 million (2013)
- Total equity: ▲US$795 million (2013)
- Number of employees: 3,300 (2013)
- Website: orbital.com
- Footnotes; Financials as of December 31, 2013 (final fiscal year end); References

Orbital Sciences Corporation (commonly referred to as Orbital) was an American company specializing in the design, manufacture, and launch of small- and medium- class space and launch vehicle systems for commercial, military and other government customers. In 2014, Orbital merged with Alliant Techsystems (ATK) to create a new company called Orbital ATK, which in turn was purchased by Northrop Grumman in 2018.

Orbital was headquartered in Dulles, Virginia and publicly traded on the New York Stock Exchange with the ticker symbol ORB. Orbital's primary products were satellites and launch vehicles, including low Earth orbit (LEO), geosynchronous Earth orbit and planetary spacecraft for communications, remote sensing, scientific and defense missions; ground- and air-launched launch vehicles that delivered satellites into orbit; missile defense systems that were used as interceptor and target vehicles; and human-rated space systems for Earth orbit, lunar and other missions. Orbital also provided satellite subsystems and space-related technical services to government agencies and laboratories.

On April 29, 2014, Orbital Sciences announced that it would merge with Alliant Techsystems to create a new company called Orbital ATK. The merger was completed on February 9, 2015, and Orbital Sciences ceased to exist as an independent entity.

On September 18, 2017, Northrop Grumman announced plans to purchase Orbital ATK for US$7.8 billion in cash plus assumption of US$1.4 billion in debt, and on June 6, 2018, the acquisition was completed, and Orbital ATK became Northrop Grumman Innovation Systems. As of January 1, 2020, the name was changed to Space Systems under a large restructuring and rebranding initiative.

== History ==
Orbital was founded and incorporated in 1982 by three friends who had met earlier while at Harvard Business School—David W. Thompson, Bruce Walker Ferguson, and Scott L. Webster. Initial capitalization for Orbital was provided by Fred C. Alcorn, a Texas oilman and Sam Dunnam, a Texas businessman in September 1982. In 1985, Orbital procured its first contract for providing up to four transfer orbital stage (TOS) vehicles to NASA. In 1987, the seeds for the Orbcomm constellation were planted when Orbital began investigating a system using low Earth orbit (LEO) satellites to collect data from remote locations. In 1988, Orbital acquired Space Data Corporation in Arizona—one of the world's leading suppliers of suborbital rockets—thereby broadening its rocket business and manufacturing capabilities. This was followed by the opening of a new facility in Chandler, Arizona in 1989 to house the company's expanding rocket business.

In 1990, the company successfully carried out eight space missions, highlighted by the initial launch of the Pegasus launch vehicle, the world's first privately developed space launch vehicle (the claim of being the first privately developed space launch vehicle can be contested as Pegasus received significant funding from NASA and DARPA, and a predecessor private rocket exists, the Conestoga rocket). Shortly following the successful Pegasus launch, Orbital conducted an initial public offering (IPO) in 1990 and began trading on the NASDAQ stock exchange. In 1993, Orbital established its headquarters in Dulles, Virginia. In 1994, Orbital successfully conducted the inaugural launch of the Taurus (now renamed as Minotaur-C) launch vehicle.

In the early 2000s, Orbital continued expanding its missile defense systems business with a US$900 million award to develop, build, test and support interceptor booster vehicles. In 2006, Orbital conducted its 500th mission since the company's founding with products that included satellites, launch vehicles, and missile defense systems. In 2007, the first interplanetary spacecraft built by Orbital, Dawn was launched on an eight-year, three-billion-mile journey to the main asteroid belt between Mars and Jupiter. A major milestone in the company's history was in 2008 when it received a long-term NASA contract to provide cargo transportation services to and from the International Space Station (ISS) with a value of approximately US$1.9 billion for missions from 2011 to 2015. Orbital used its Cygnus spacecraft and Antares launch vehicle to transport cargo to ISS following the success of Cygnus Orb-D1 and Cygnus CRS Orb-1.

=== Acquisitions ===
Orbital Science made a number of strategic acquisitions in the 1990s and 2000s to strengthen its position in the satellite market.

In 1994, Orbital completed acquisition of Fairchild Industries' subsidiary Space and Defense Corporation, and merged the Fairchild Space business with its own satellite design and manufacturing division. The electronics business of this subsidiary was later sold off in 2000.

In 1997, Orbital acquired CTA, Inc, a company that, under the spacecraft design engineering and business leadership of Tom van der Heyden – designer of the GEOStar spacecraft – had designed and built the first geostationary "lightsat" under contract to Indonesia for Asia's first Direct Broadcast Satellite (DBS) television broadcast program, and the world's first S-Band television broadcast satellite – providing an entry into the fast-growing Geosynchronous (GEO) communications satellite market.

In 2010, Orbital acquired the Gilbert, Arizona-based satellite development and manufacturing unit from General Dynamics (General Dynamics Advanced Information Systems, formerly Spectrum Astro) to complement its main satellite manufacturing facility in Dulles, Virginia.

=== Merger ===
On April 29, 2014, Orbital Sciences announced that it had entered into a definitive agreement with Alliant Techsystems to combine Orbital and ATK's Aerospace and Defense (A&D) Groups to create a US$4.5 billion (combined calendar year 2013 annual revenue), 13000-person company. The new company was called Orbital ATK, Inc.

On September 18, 2017, Northrop Grumman announced plans to purchase Orbital ATK for US$7.8 billion in cash plus assumption of US$1.4 billion in debt. Orbital ATK shareholders approved the buyout on November 29, 2017. The Federal Trade Commission (FTC) approved the acquisition with conditions on June 5, 2018, and one day later, Orbital ATK were absorbed and became Northrop Grumman Innovation Systems.

== Business groups ==
=== Space Systems Group (SSG) ===
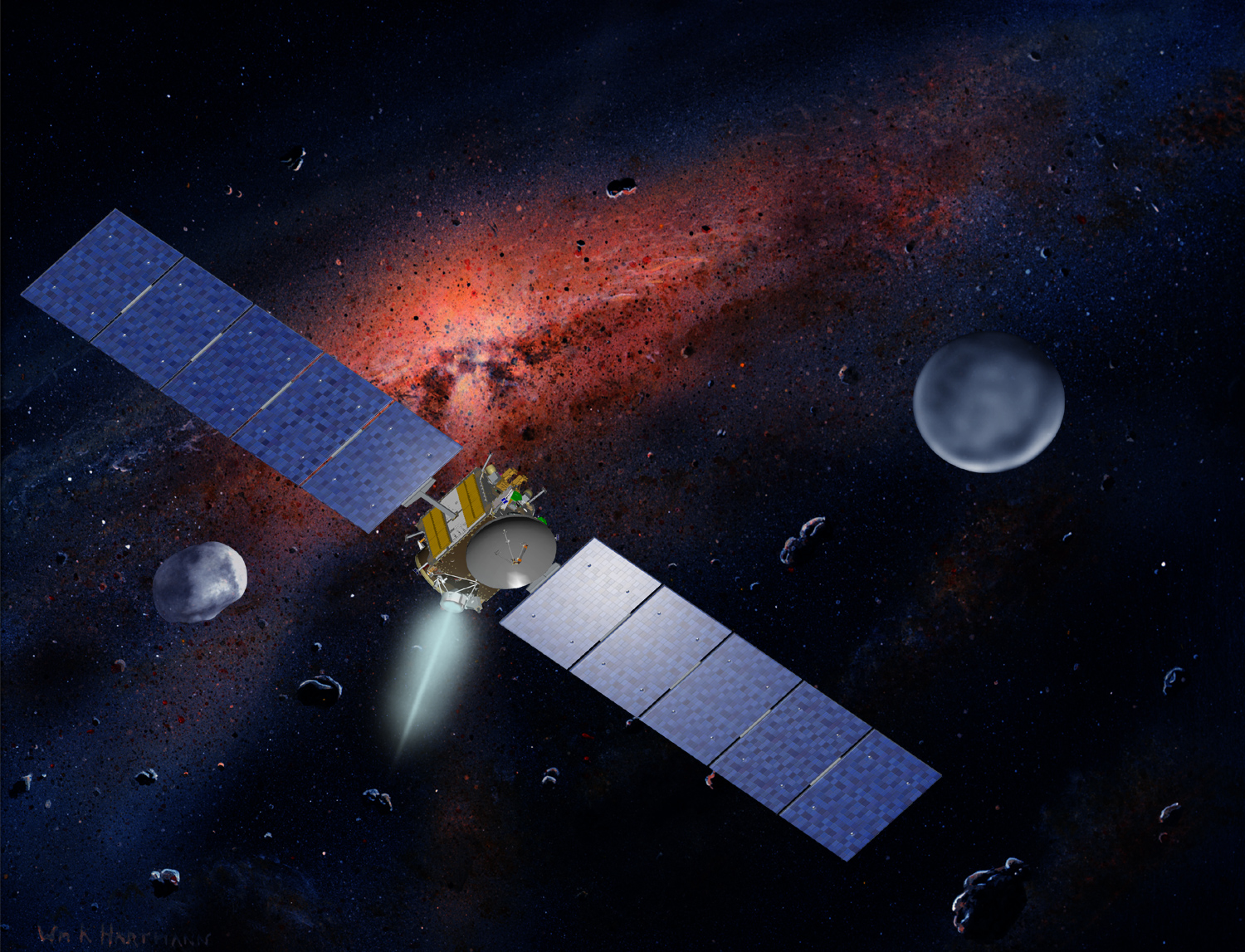
NASA's Dawn spacecraft, built by Orbital

Orbital was a provider of small- to medium-class satellites. Since the company's founding in 1982, Orbital has delivered 150 spacecraft to commercial, military and civil customers worldwide. To date, these spacecraft have amassed well over 1000 years of on-orbit operations.

The communications and imaging satellites developed by Orbital are smaller and more affordable. The geosynchronous orbit (GEO) communications satellites provide commercial satellite services such as direct-to-home digital television, business data transmission, cable program distribution and wireless communications. In addition, Orbital also provides constellations of low Earth orbit communications satellites such as the 35-satellite ORBCOMM data communications network, and the 81 spacecraft (integration and test) for the IridiumNEXT constellation. Earth imagery and high resolution digital imaging satellites such as the OrbView series are also developed and manufactured by Orbital.

The science and environmental satellites developed by Orbital perform scientific research, carry out deep space exploration (e.g. Dawn spacecraft), conduct remote sensing missions (e.g. Landsat 4, 5 and 8), and demonstrate new space technologies. In the last 10 years, Orbital has built more scientific and environmental monitoring satellites for NASA than any other company.

=== Launch Systems Group (LSG) ===
Orbital's space launch vehicles are considered the industry standard for boosting small payloads to orbit. The Pegasus launch vehicle is launched from the company's L-1011 carrier aircraft, Stargazer and has proven to be the industry's small space launch workhorse, having conducted 40 missions from six different launch sites worldwide since 1990.

The Minotaur ground-launched launch vehicles combine Pegasus upper-stages with either government-supplied or commercially available first-stage rocket motors to boost larger payloads to orbit. Minotaur IV combines decommissioned Peacekeeper rocket motors with proven Orbital avionics and fairings to provide increased lifting capacity for government-sponsored payloads.

With the development of the Antares space launch vehicle, Orbital is extending its capabilities to provide medium-class launch services for U.S. government, commercial and international customers. The inaugural launch of Antares occurred on April 21, 2013, from Wallops Flight Facility (WFF) at Wallops Island, Virginia.

Orbital is also a major provider of suborbital target and interceptor launch vehicles for the U.S. missile defense systems. In the last 10 years, Orbital conducted nearly 50 major launches for the U.S. Missile Defense Agency (MDA), the U.S. Air Force, the U.S. Army and U.S. Navy to develop, test and enhance U.S. missile defense systems.

=== Advanced Programs Group (APG) ===
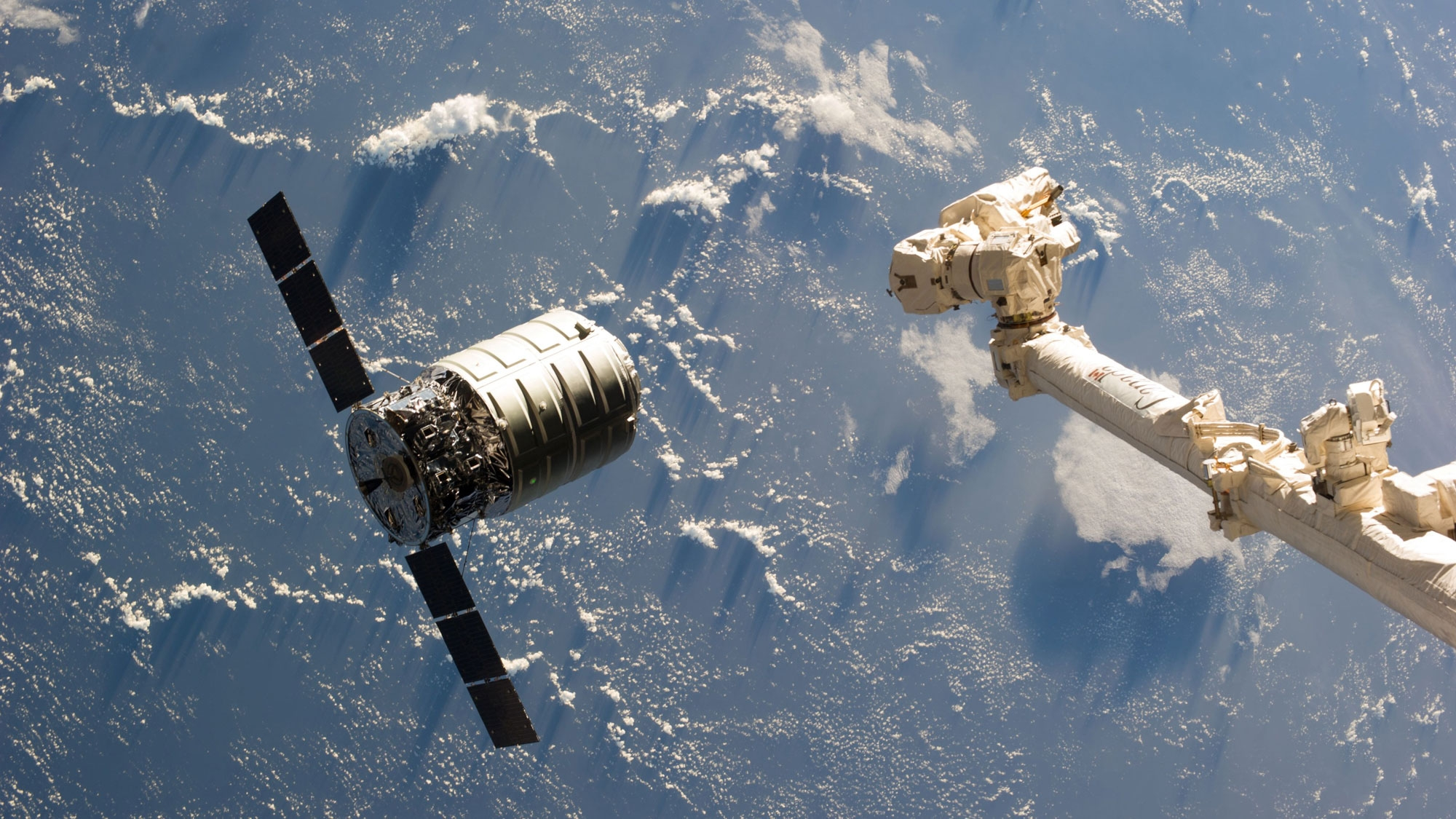
Cygnus approaching ISS

Orbital's Advanced Programs Group focused on developing and producing human-rated space systems, satellites and related systems for national security space programs, and advanced flight systems for atmospheric and space missions.

In support of human space systems, Orbital is one of two companies providing commercial cargo resupply services to the ISS for NASA. Orbital's medium-class rocket—Antares is used to launch the Cygnus advanced maneuvering spacecraft to deliver cargo to the ISS. Under the Commercial Resupply Services (CRS) contract with NASA, Orbital will perform eight cargo missions to the ISS. Operational flights began in 2013 from the new Mid-Atlantic Regional Spaceport (MARS) at Wallops Island in Virginia. In addition, the company is exploring opportunities to adapt the Cygnus design for other possible space exploration applications.

For National Security Space systems, Orbital provides products ranging from smaller, more affordable spacecraft busses to hosted payload applications. For Advanced Flight systems, Orbital is applying its to design and build an intermediate-class air-launched rocket system for Stratolaunch Systems. Orbital has developed the operational concept and completed the preliminary design for the air-launched rocket. It will be responsible for the development, production, test and operations of the full system and related ground operations.

=== Technical Services Division (TSD) ===
The Technical Services Division (TSD) provided engineering, production and technical management expertise primarily for space-related science and defense programs. Typically, it supplies specialized personnel—engineers, scientists, technicians and other professionals—with specific knowledge in the areas that its customers are pursuing. The Orbital employees often work side-by-side with the customers' technical staff at their facilities. They perform a wide range of functions, from system-level efforts such as special payload equipment and training support for NASA's Hubble Space Telescope servicing missions to component-level tasks including development of high-energy microwave transmitters for the National Radio Astronomy Observatory (NRAO).

=== Transportation Management Systems (TMS) ===
The TMS unit combined satellite navigation and Wireless communications to enable transit control centers to manage the dispatch of public transit, highway service vehicles and commuter light rail systems. As of 2008, the technology was used by more than 60 clients, exceeding 27500 vehicles, or more than 30% of the United States and Canada fleet. TMS clients included some of the nation's largest fleet management systems, such as Los Angeles, Chicago, and Washington, D.C. In 2008, the technology services provider Affiliated Computer Services (ACS) Inc. agreed to buy the Transportation Management Systems unit for US$42.5 million. The sale transferred an estimated 130 to 140 Orbital employees based in Columbia, Maryland, to ACS.

== Primary facility locations ==
Orbital's primary locations are listed below-

- Dulles, Virginia- corporate headquarters and primary location for Satellite Design and Manufacturing (located at 45101 "Warp Drive")
- Mid-Atlantic Regional Spaceport, Wallops Island, Virginia- Launch Vehicle Assembly, Testing and Launch; Cargo Logistics Spacecraft Processing; Research Rocket Assembly, Test and Launch
- Chandler, Arizona – Launch Vehicle Design and Manufacturing and Program Offices
- Gilbert, Arizona- Satellite Design and Manufacturing
- Greenbelt, Maryland- Technical Services Division
- Vandenberg Air Force Base, California- Launch Vehicle Assembly, Test and Launch
- Huntington Beach, California- Southern California Engineering Center
- Huntsville, Alabama- Missile Defense Systems Engineering and Manufacturing

== Orbital products ==
=== Space launch vehicles ===
- Minotaur – Employing a combination of U.S. government-supplied rocket motors and Orbital's commercial launch technologies, the Minotaur family of launchers provides low-cost access to space for government sponsored payloads.
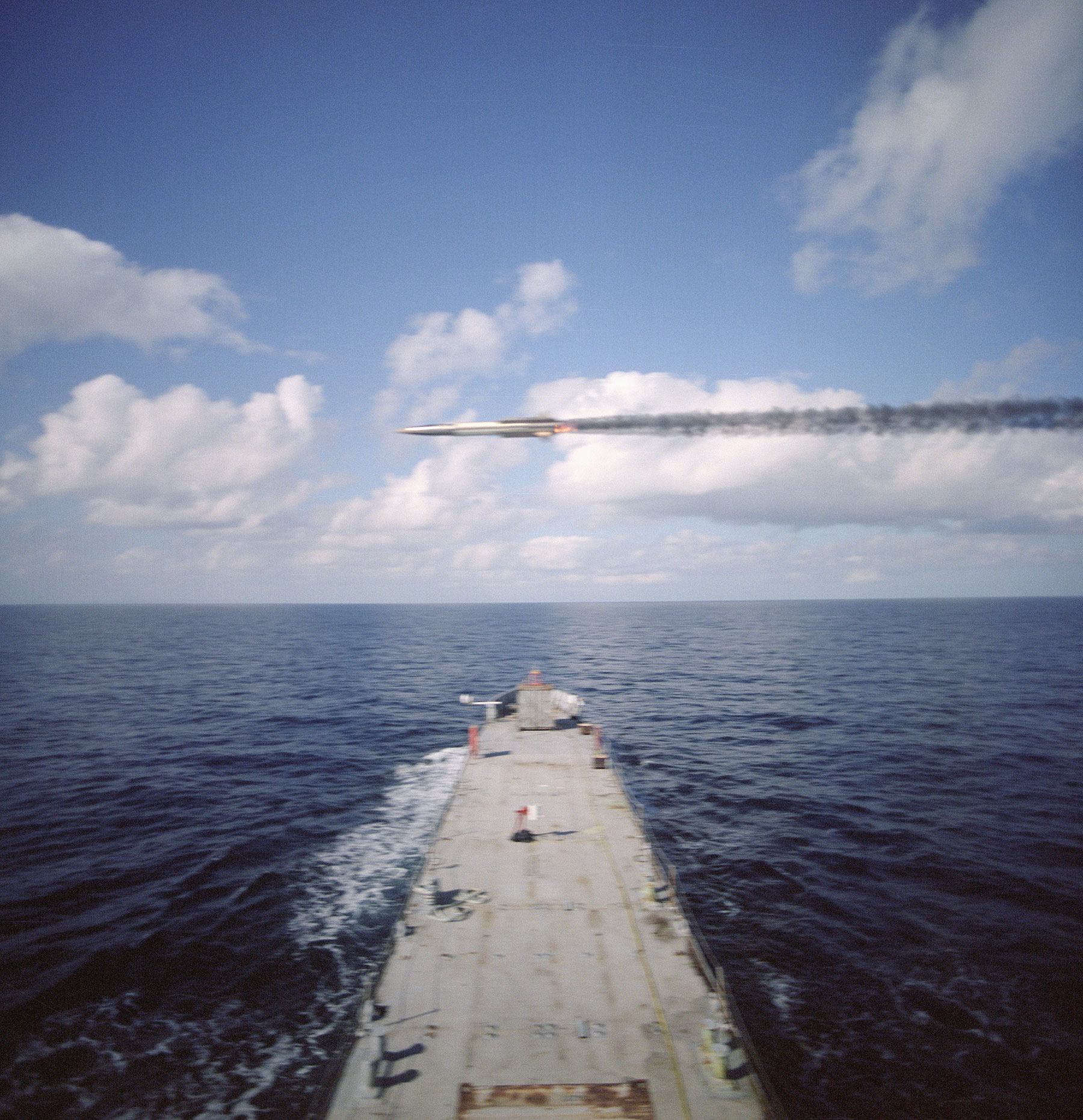
  The GQM-163A Coyote flies over the bow of the U.S. Navy observation ship during a routine test.
  - Minotaur I – Minotaur I made its inaugural flight in January 2000, successfully delivering several small military and university satellites into orbit and marking the first-ever use of residual U.S. Government Minuteman boosters in a space launch vehicle. To date, Minotaur I has conducted 11 missions with a 100% success record, having launched a total of 62 satellites.
  - Minotaur IV – The Minotaur IV space launch vehicle consists of three Peacekeeper solid rocket stages, a commercial Orion 38 fourth-stage motor and subsystems derived from OSC's established space launch boosters, including a flight-proven standard 92-inch fairing. Capable of boosting payloads more than 1,750 kg into orbit, Minotaur IV supports dedicated or shared launch missions and is compatible with multiple U.S. government and commercial launch sites. The inaugural Minotaur IV flight occurred in 2010 and five missions have been conducted through 2016 with a 100% success record boosting nine satellite into orbit and two hypersonic flight vehicles on suborbital trajectories.
  - Minotaur V – Minotaur V is a five-stage evolutionary version of Minotaur IV to provide a cost-effective capability to launch U.S. Government-sponsored small spacecraft into high energy trajectories, including Geosynchronous Transfer Orbits (GTO) as well as translunar and beyond. Like Minotaur IV, the first three stages of the Minotaur V are former Peacekeeper solid rocket motors. The fourth and fifth stages are commercial STAR™ motors. The inaugural Minotaur V mission successfully boosted NASA's LADEE spacecraft on a lunar trajectory in September 2013.
  - Minotaur VI – The Minotaur VI vehicle adds a lower stage to the existing and flight demonstrated Minotaur IV vehicle configuration providing a significant increase in performance with only a modest increase in cost. Capable of boosting up to 2,600 kg to Low-Earth Orbit, Minotaur VI is also available with an optional upper-stage motor for high energy trajectory missions.
  - Minotaur-C – The Minotaur-C (formerly known as Taurus) space launch vehicle is a commercial variant of the Minotaur product line designed to serve the U.S. government market. Of 9 launches, 6 have been successful.
- Pegasus – The three-stage Pegasus was used to deploy small satellites weighing up to 1,000 pounds into low-Earth orbit. Pegasus was carried aloft by the "Stargazer" L-1011 aircraft to approximately 40,000 feet over open ocean, where it was released and free-falls five seconds before igniting its first-stage rocket motor. With its unique delta-shaped wing, Pegasus typically delivered satellites into orbit in a little over 10 minutes. Pegasus had conducted 46 missions between 1990 and 2026, 41 of which were successful.

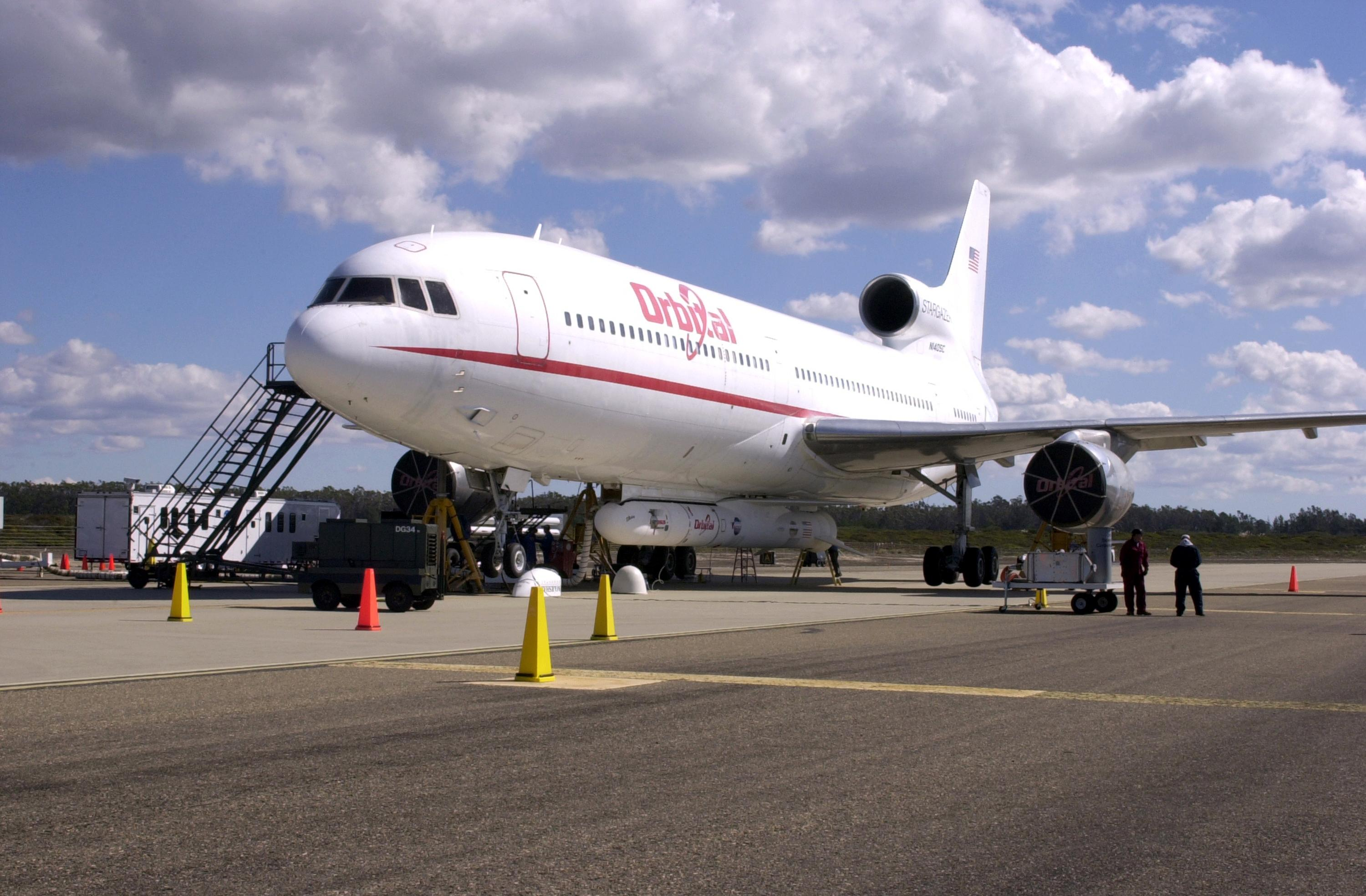
Lockheed L-1011 TriStar Stargazer with Pegasus Rocket underneath

- Pegasus II – Pegasus II was to be an air-launched orbital rocket, which was under development in 2012–2015. The design was "shelved" by Stratolaunch in May 2015.
- Antares – Antares is a two-stage launch vehicle designed to deliver medium-class payloads weighing up to 6120 kg into space. Antares utilizes refurbished Russian-built engines which were originally manufactured in the 1960s and 1970s for the Soviet Moon rocket. Initially developed to demonstrate commercial re-supply of the International Space Station under a NASA contract, the first launch took place on April 21, 2013, from Wallops Flight Facility, Virginia. The fifth launch ended in failure on October 28, 2014, completely destroying the vehicle and damaging the launch pad.
- Antares follow on – Following the loss of the Antares rocket on the Orb-3 mission in October 2014, Orbital announced that it would not use "the 40-year-old AJ-26 engines on the rocket’s next flight." The new first stage engine is reportedly the Russian RD-193 rather than the AJ-26 engines used in the initial version of the Antares launch vehicle, which were remanufactured Russian NK-33s. Orbital Sciences Corp. has reportedly signed a contract with Russia's NPO Energomash to supply 60 new built RD-181 engines for the Antares rocket. While Antares/AJ-26 is not flying and the follow-on launch vehicle is in development and test, Orbital is shopping to purchase launch services for its Cygnus capsule to ISS cargo runs temporarily from another launch service provider.

=== Commercial Resupply Services (CRS) to ISS ===
With the successful demonstration in September 2013 of the Cygnus spacecraft and the Antares launch vehicle under the Commercial Orbital Transportation Services (COTS) program, Orbital commenced regular ISS cargo missions under the Commercial Resupply Services (CRS) contract. The total NASA contract to Orbital is worth $1.9 Billion for providing eight pressurized cargo missions to the ISS. Cygnus is capable of delivering 2,000 kg of pressurized cargo to the ISS. An enhanced version to be flown in later CRS missions is able to deliver 2,700 kg of pressurized cargo. The first of the eight contracted Cygnus missions to the ISS was completed on February 18, 2014. The October 28, 2014, launch failure was the third contracted Cygnus mission to the ISS.

=== Missile Defense Systems – interceptors and targets ===
Orbital's Missile Defense Systems product line consists of interceptors and target vehicles.

- The Ground-Based Interceptor – Orbital is the sole supplier of interceptor boosters for the U.S. Missile Defense Agency's Ground-Based Midcourse Defense (GMD) system, to defend against long-range ballistic missile attacks. The GMD system is designed to intercept and destroy hostile ballistic missiles in their midcourse phase of flight before they reenter the Earth's atmosphere. Orbital is responsible for the design, development and testing of the Orbital Boost Vehicle (OBV), a silo-launched, three-stage rocket derived from its Pegasus, Taurus and Minotaur space launch boosters. The OBV has successfully conducted multiple test flights and has been deployed in silos in Alaska and California.
- Ballistic Missile Targets – Orbital's family of target vehicles extends from long-range ballistic target launch vehicles, which include targets for testing MDA's GMD system, to medium- and short-range target vehicles. Current programs include Air-launched Intermediate-Range Ballistic Missile (IRBM) targets and Ground-launched Intercontinental Ballistic Missile(ICBM) targets.
- GQM-163A “Coyote” Anti-Ship Cruise Missile Target – The GQM-163A “Coyote” is used for Anti-Ship Cruise Missile (ASCM) targets. It can achieve cruise speeds of over Mach 2.5 while flying approximately 15 feet above the ocean's surface ("sea-skimming" trajectory). In addition to this sea-skimming trajectory, Orbital has also successfully demonstrated a "high diver" trajectory mission.

=== Communications satellites ===
GEO communications satellites
With its proprietary GEOStar-2 satellite platform, Orbital has become a leading supplier of 1.5–5.5 kilowatt Geosynchronous-Earth Orbit (GEO) communications satellites used to provide direct-to-home TV broadcasting, cable program distribution, business data network capacity, regional mobile communications and similar services. With its new GEOStar-3 satellite platform, Orbital is extending its capabilities with up to 8 kW of total satellite payload power. The list of Orbital built GeoStar satellites are provided next.

- IndoStar-1
- BSAT-2a
- BSAT-2b
- BSAT-2c
- N-Star c
- Galaxy 12
- Galaxy 14
- Galaxy 15
- TELKOM-2
- Optus D1
- Optus D2
- Optus D3
- Intelsat 11
- Horizons-2
- Thor 5
- AMC-21
- NSS-9
- MEASAT-3a
- Intelsat 15
- Intelsat 16
- KOREASAT 6
- Intelsat 18
- New Dawn
- SES-1
- SES-2
- SES-3
- HYLAS 2
- Intelsat 23
- Star One C3
- Azerspace/Africasat-1a
- Mexsat Bicentenario
- SES-8
- Thaicom 6
- Amazonas 4A
- SKYM-1 for DirecTV (in development/production at time of merger)
- Thaicom 8 (in development/production at time of merger)

LEO communications satellites

ORBCOMM

Orbital is also a provider of low-Earth orbit (LEO) communications satellites, having conceived, built and deployed the ORBCOMM network. ORBCOMM was the first global communications network to employ a constellation of LEO satellites. From 1994–1999, Orbital built and deployed 35 satellites, and integrated five “gateway” ground stations and a network operations center to manage the satellites and process their data.

Iridium NEXT

Under a contract with Thales Alenia Space, Orbital is conducting integration and test services for Iridium NEXT, the next-generation satellite constellation of Iridium Communications Inc. Orbital will integrate the communications payloads and platforms for 81 low-Earth orbit Iridium NEXT satellites and test the systems at its satellite manufacturing facility in Gilbert, Arizona.

=== Imaging satellites ===
Orbital Imaging spacecraft are designed to provide commercial Earth imaging services. The OrbView series of spacecraft paved the way for today's space-based Earth imaging industry. In addition to the OrbView satellites the company also built the GeoEye-1 high resolution imaging satellite. Orbital LEOStar-2 and −3 spacecraft platforms are designed to support a variety of multispectral, visible and thermal imaging payloads. A list of commercial imaging satellites built by Orbital is provided next.

- GeoEye-1 (originally known as OrbView-5)
- OrbView-4
- OrbView-3
- OrbView-2
- OrbView-1
- Earlybird-1

=== Science and environmental satellites ===
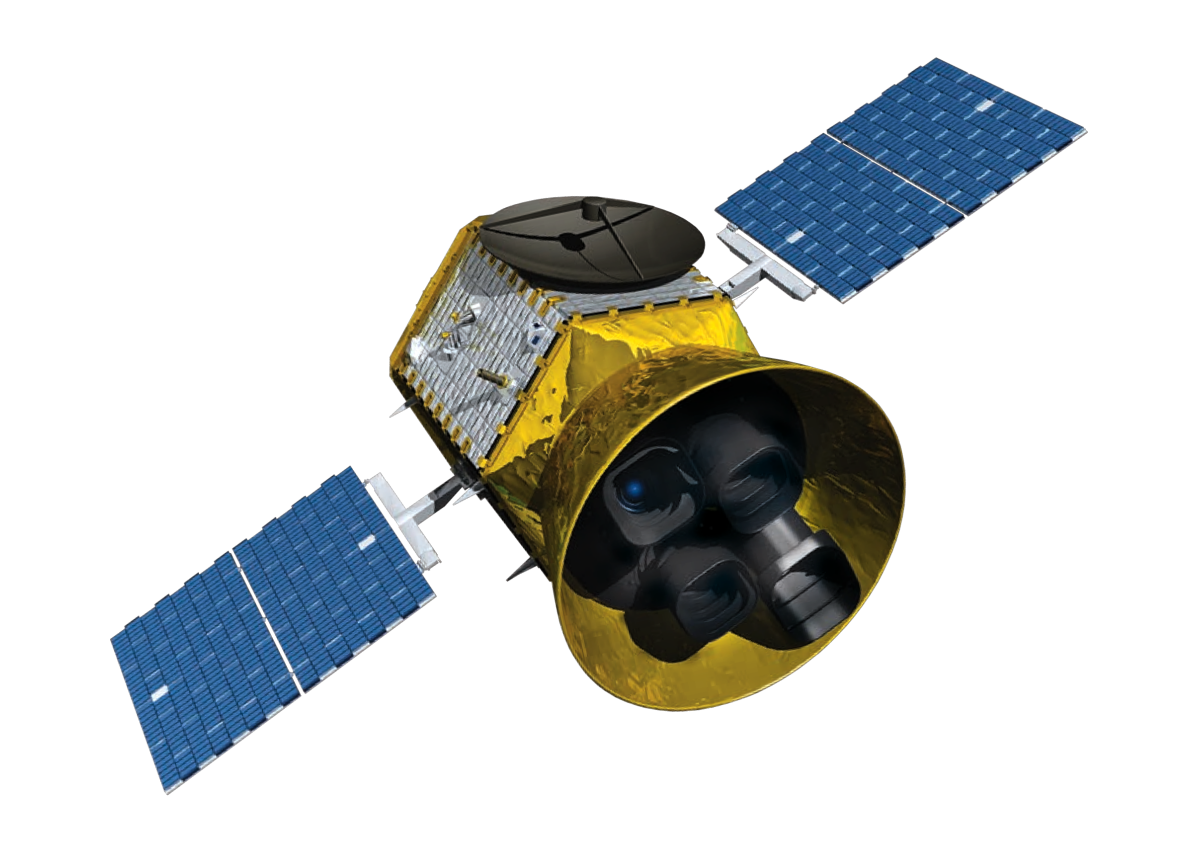
TESS satellite

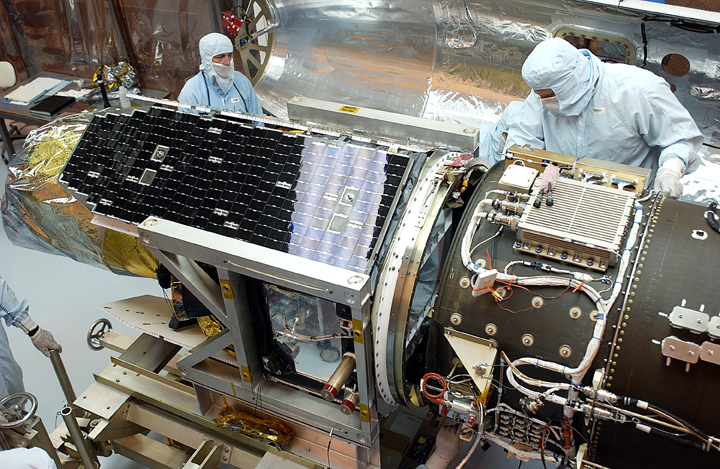
GALEX being mated to the Pegasus

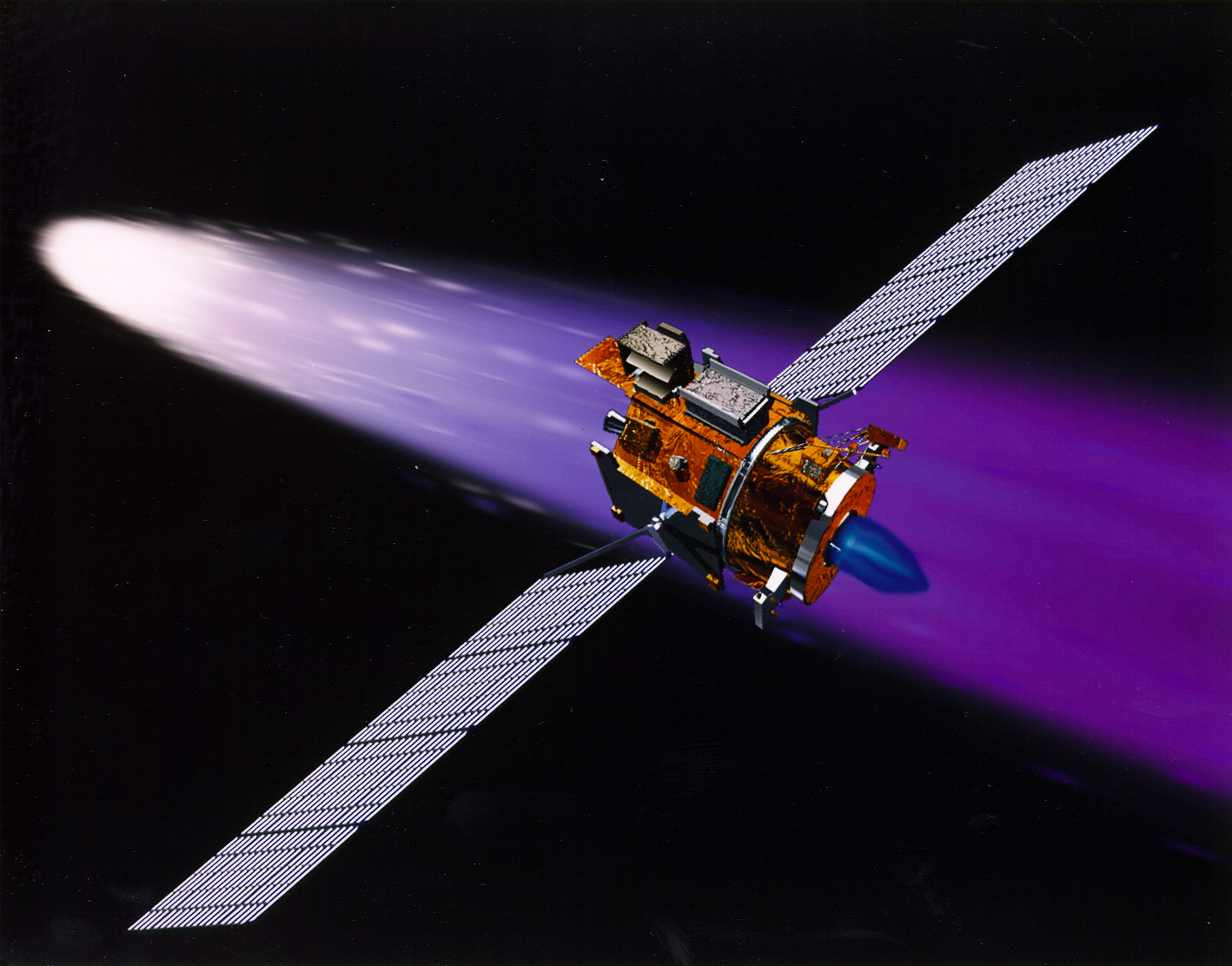
Deep Space I's flyby of comet 19P/Borrelly (artist rendering)

Orbital built Science and Environmental satellites conduct astrophysics, Remote sensing/Earth Observation, heliophysics, planetary exploration and technology demonstration missions. These satellites are built on Orbital's LEOStar-1,-2, or −3 satellite platforms depending on the mission requirements and budget.

Astrophysics satellites
Orbital's current and heritage astrophysics satellites are as listed below:

- Transiting Exoplanet Survey Satellite (TESS) for NASA/ MIT – launched in 2018
- Nuclear Spectroscopic Telescope Array (NuSTAR) for NASA/ JPL – launched in 2012
- Fermi Gamma-ray Space Telescope for NASA GSFC – launched in 2008
- Swift Gamma-Ray Burst Mission for NASA GSFC – launched in 2004
- Galaxy Evolution Explorer (GALEX) for NASA GSFC – launched in 2003
- Far Ultraviolet Spectroscopic Explorer (FUSE) for NASA/ Johns Hopkins University – launched in 1999
- Extreme Ultraviolet Explorer (EUVE) for NASA – launched in 1992

Remote sensing/Earth observation
Orbital's current and heritage Remote Sensing/Earth Observation satellites are as listed below:

- Ionospheric Connection Explorer (ICON) for NASA GSFC – launched in 2019
- Ice, Cloud, and Land Elevation Satellite-2 (ICESat-2) for NASA GSFC – launched in 2018
- Orbiting Carbon Observatory-2 (OCO-2) for NASA/JPL – launched in 2014
- Landsat 8 for NASA/USGS – launched in 2013
- Glory for NASA GSFC – launched in 2011 (did not achieve orbit due to a launch failure)
- Orbiting Carbon Observatory (OCO) for NASA/JPL – launched in 2009 (did not achieve orbit due to a launch failure)
- Aeronomy of Ice in the Mesosphere (AIM) for NASA/Hampton University – launched in 2007
- FORMOSAT-3/COSMIC for National Space Organization Taiwan – launched in 2006
- Coriolis for Naval Research Laboratory and Air Force Research Laboratory – launched in 2003
- QuikTOMS for NASA GSFC – launched in 2001 (did not achieve orbit due to a launch failure)
- SeaStar for NASA/ORBIMAGE – launched in 1997
- MicroLab-1 for NASA/UCAR – launched in 1995
- TOPEX/Poseidon for NASA/CNES (France) – launched in 1992
- Upper Atmosphere Research Satellite (UARS) for NASA- launched in 1991
- Landsat 5 for NASA/USGS – launched in 1984 (the satellite holds Guinness World Record for longest operating earth observing satellite)
- Landsat 4 for NASA/USGS- launched in 1982

Heliophysics
Orbital's heritage Heliophysics satellites are as listed below:

- Interstellar Boundary Explorer (IBEX) for NASA/SwRI – launched in 2008
- Solar Radiation and Climate Experiment (SORCE) for NASA/LASP – launched in 2003
- Reuven Ramaty High Energy Solar Spectroscopic Imager (RHESSI) for NASA/ University of California, Berkeley – launched in 2002
- Active Cavity Radiometer Irradiance Monitor Satellite (ACRIMSAT) for NASA/ JPL – launched in 1999

Planetary exploration
Orbital's heritage Planetary Exploration Heliophysics satellites are as listed below:

- Dawn for NASA/ JPL – launched in 2007
- Deep Space 1 for NASA/ JPL – launched in 1998

=== National security systems ===
Orbital's national security systems range from smaller, more affordable spacecraft buses (e.g. disaggregated systems) to hosted payload applications.

Orbital advocates disaggregated systems because conceptually disaggregated systems can lower the cost and accelerate the development and deployment of national security space systems. For example, Orbital's GEOStar-1 spacecraft provides a compact platform optimized for GEO missions (adaptable for MEO for launch aboard Minotaur, Falcon, and EELV launch vehicles to deliver resilient capabilities in a relatively short period of time (years instead of decades). Orbital's hosted payload capabilities in national security systems include the Hosted Infrared Payload (CHIRP) program for the U.S. Air Force. The wide-field of view sensor was hosted on an Orbital-built commercial GEO communications satellite. Orbital's hosted payload program takes advantage of the high frequency of commercial satellite launches and the excess resources that typically exist on a commercial communications satellite to provide frequent and low-cost access to space for National Security Systems.

=== Advanced flight systems ===
Orbital's current advanced flight systems programs include the contract with Stratolaunch Systems to design a new intermediate-class rocket to be carried aloft and launched from the largest aircraft ever built-Stratolaunch carrier aircraft. Orbital is responsible for the program's overall systems engineering, and the development, production, test, and operations of the air-launch rocket and related ground operations, including payload and launch vehicle integration. A demo launch is currently scheduled for 2017. Orbital's heritage programs in advanced flight systems include the NASA X-34 and X-43 programs, and the Orion Launch Abort System, among others.

== See also ==
- Commercial Resupply Services
- NewSpace
- SpaceX
- Space exploration
