= Galaxy 9 =

Geostationary communication satellite

- Mission type: Communications
- Operator: PanAmSat / Intelsat
- COSPAR ID: 1996-033A
- SATCAT no.: 23877
- Mission duration: 15 years

Spacecraft properties
- Bus: HS-376
- Manufacturer: Hughes
- Launch mass: 1,397 kilograms (3,080 lb)
- Dry mass: 700 kilograms (1,500 lb)

Start of mission
- Launch date: May 24, 1996, 01:09:59 UTC
- Rocket: Delta II 7925
- Launch site: Cape Canaveral LC-17B

Orbital parameters
- Reference system: Geocentric
- Regime: Graveyard
- Slot: 81° W
- Semi-major axis: 42,369.0 kilometers (26,326.9 mi)
- Perigee altitude: 35,973.9 kilometres (22,353.1 mi)
- Apogee altitude: 36,023.3 kilometres (22,383.8 mi)
- Inclination: 6.8°
- Period: 1.446.6 minutes
- Epoch: 19 April 2017

Galaxy 9 (G-9) was a geostationary communication satellite built by Hughes. It was located at an orbital position of 81 degrees west longitude and was initially operated by PanAmSat and later by Intelsat. The satellite was based on the HS-376 platform and its life expectancy was 15 years. The satellite was successfully launched into space on May 23, 1996, at 01:09:59 UTC, by means of a Delta II vehicle from Cape Canaveral Air Force Station, United States. It had a launch mass of 3080 pounds (1397 kg).

The Galaxy 9 was equipped with 24 (plus 6 spare) C-band transponders to provide services to South America.
