= Thaicom 8 =

Thai satellite

THAICOM 8
- Mission logo of THAICOM 8
- Mission type: Communication
- Operator: Thaicom PLC
- COSPAR ID: 2016-031A
- SATCAT no.: 41552
- Mission duration: 15 years

Spacecraft properties
- Bus: GEOStar-2
- Manufacturer: Orbital ATK
- Launch mass: 3,100 Kilograms

Start of mission
- Launch date: May 27, 2016, 9:40 UTC
- Rocket: Falcon 9 Full Thrust
- Launch site: Cape Canaveral SLC-40
- Contractor: SpaceX

Orbital parameters
- Reference system: Geocentric
- Regime: Geostationary

THAICOM 8 (Thai: ไทยคม 8) is a Thai satellite of the THAICOM series, operated by Thaicom Public Limited Company, a subsidiary of INTOUCH, and is considered to be the 8th THAICOM satellite headquartered in Bangkok, Thailand.

== Overview ==
Manufactured by Orbital ATK, the 3,100-kilogram (6,800 lb) THAICOM 8 communications satellite will serve Thailand, India, and Africa from the 78.5° East geostationary location. It is equipped with 24 active Ku-band transponders for sending high-definition television signals through the satellite to residential dwellings.

== Launch ==
THAICOM 8 was approved for launch into orbit on 18 March 2014. It was launched at the Cape Canaveral SLC-40 in Florida on 27 May 2016, by SpaceX. The first stage of the Falcon 9 used to launch THAICOM 8 successfully landed on ASDS - Of Course I Still Love You. It was the fourth successful landing of a Falcon 9 Full Thrust.

== Reuse of the Falcon 9 First Stage ==
The B1023 first stage was later converted into a Falcon Heavy side booster, which performed a static fire test in calendar-week 20 of 2017. This first stage then continued to land again at the Landing Zone 1 at Cape Canaveral Air Force Station during the Falcon Heavy maiden test flight.

== See also ==
- Thaicom 4
- Thaicom 5
- Thaicom 6
- Thaicom 7
- List of Falcon 9 and Falcon Heavy launches
