= Intelsat 16 =

Geostationary communications satellite

- Mission type: Communications
- Operator: Intelsat
- COSPAR ID: 2010-006A
- SATCAT no.: 36397
- Mission duration: 15 years

Spacecraft properties
- Bus: Star-2.4
- Manufacturer: Orbital Sciences
- Launch mass: 2,056 kilograms (4,533 lb)

Start of mission
- Launch date: 12 February 2010, 00:39:40 UTC
- Rocket: Proton-M/Briz-M
- Launch site: Baikonur 200/39
- Contractor: International Launch Services

Orbital parameters
- Reference system: Geocentric
- Regime: Geostationary
- Longitude: 58° west
- Perigee altitude: 35,781 kilometres (22,233 mi)
- Apogee altitude: 35,803 kilometres (22,247 mi)
- Inclination: 0.01 degrees
- Period: 23.93 hours
- Epoch: 24 December 2013, 12:13:29 UTC

Transponders
- Band: 24 Ku-band
- Bandwidth: 36 MHz
- Coverage area: Mexico; Brazil

Intelsat 16 is a communications satellite owned by Intelsat planned to be located at 58°W.L. It was built by Orbital Sciences Corporation, on a Star-2.4 bus. Intelsat 16 was formerly known as PAS-11R. It was launched on February 12, 2010 by ILS Proton-M launch vehicle.

The Intelsat 16 (IS-16) satellite was manufactured for Intelsat to provide Direct-To-Home (DTH) transponder capacity for DirecTV subsidiaries. The satellite included 24 Ku band transponders for use over Brazil for Sky Brasil at 43.1 degrees West Longitude or for capacity coverage over Mexico and Gulf of Mexico regions at 58 degrees West Longitude.
