= Horizons-1 =

American Communications Satellite

Horizons-1 / Galaxy 13
- Names: Horizons-1 / Galaxy 13
- Mission type: Communication
- Operator: Intelsat / SKY Perfect JSAT
- COSPAR ID: 2003-044A
- SATCAT no.: 27954
- Website: Intelsat Page; JSAT Page; Galaxy 13 Page
- Mission duration: 15 years (planned); 22 years, 7 months, 13 days (in progress)

Spacecraft properties
- Spacecraft: Horizons-1
- Spacecraft type: BSS
- Bus: BSS-601
- Manufacturer: Boeing
- Launch mass: 4060 kg
- Dry mass: 2630 kg
- Dimensions: 26.2 x 7.0 metre with solar panels and antennas deployed.
- Power: 9900 watts

Start of mission
- Launch date: 1 October 2003, 04:03:07 UTC
- Rocket: Zenit-3SL
- Launch site: Ocean Odyssey; Pacific Ocean
- Contractor: Sea Launch

Orbital parameters
- Reference system: Geocentric orbit
- Regime: Geostationary orbit
- Longitude: 127.0° West

Transponders
- Band: K_{u}-band: 24 (+ 8 spares); C-band: 24 (+ 8 spares)
- Frequency: 36 MHz
- Bandwidth: 1728 MHz
- Coverage area: North America, Puerto Rico, Alaska, Hawaii and Mexico
- TWTA power: K_{u}-band, 108 watts C-band, 40 watts

Horizons-1, also known as Galaxy 13, is a geostationary communications satellite operated by Intelsat and SKY Perfect JSAT (JSAT) which was designed and manufactured by Boeing on the BSS-601 platform. It has K_{u}-band and C-band payload and was used to replace Galaxy 9 at the 127.0° West longitude. It covers North America, Puerto Rico, Alaska, Hawaii and Mexico.

== Satellite description ==
The spacecraft was designed and manufactured by Boeing on the BSS-601 satellite bus. It had a launch mass of 4,060 kilograms (8,950 lb) and a mass of 2,630 kilograms (5,800 lb) at the beginning of its 15-year design life. When stowed for launch, it measured 5.7 metres (19 ft) of height and 2.7 by 3.6 metres (8 ft 10 in × 11 ft 10 in) on its sides. Its solar panels span 26.2 metres (86 ft) when fully deployed and, with its antennas in fully extended configuration it is 7.0 metres (23.0 ft) wide.

It had two wings with four solar panels each that used dual-junction GsAs solar cells. Its power system generated 9.9 kW of power at beginning of life and 8.9 kW at the end of its design life and had a 30-cell NiH battery for surviving solar eclipse.

Its propulsion system was composed of an R-4D-11-300 LAE with a thrust of 490 newtons (110 lb_{f}). It also had twelve 22 newtons (4.9 lb_{f}) bipropellant thrusters for station keeping and attitude control. For North-South stationkeeping, its primary method was an electric propulsion system with four XIPS 13, with four of the chemical thrusters acting as backup. It included enough propellant for orbit circularization and 15 years of operation.

It had two 2.7 metres (107 in) Gregorian antennas and 1.3 metres (50 in) two gridded shaped antennas.

Its K_{u}-band payload is composed of 24 active plus eight spares 36 MHz transponders powered by TWTA with an output power of 108 watts. It covers North America, Puerto Rico, Alaska, Hawaii and Mexico and is known as Horizons-1.

The C-band payload had another 24 plus eight spares 36 MHz transponders powered by 40 watts TWTA. It covers North America, Puerto Rico, Alaska, Hawaii and Mexico and is known as Galaxy 13, which was used to replace Galaxy 9.

== History ==
Horizons Satellite was originally an equal share joint venture with PanAmSat. On 4 September 2001, it ordered from Boeing its first satellite, Horizons-1 / Galaxy 13. It was a 4,000 kilograms (8,800 lb) spacecraft with 24 C-band and 24 K_{u}-band transponders. It had a 10 kW power generation capacity and 15 years of expected life. On the same day of the satellite order, Boeing disclosed that it had received a parallel contract from PanAmSat, where the latter had exercised an existing option to launch Horizons-1 from its Sea Launch subsidiary.

It was successfully launched on 1 October 2003 at 04:03:07 UTC, aboard a Zenit-3SL rocket from the Ocean Odyssey platform stationed at the 154.0° West over the Equator in the Pacific Ocean.

In late 2005, PanAmSat was taken over by Intelsat who continued the joint venture.
