= Mass media in Mexico =

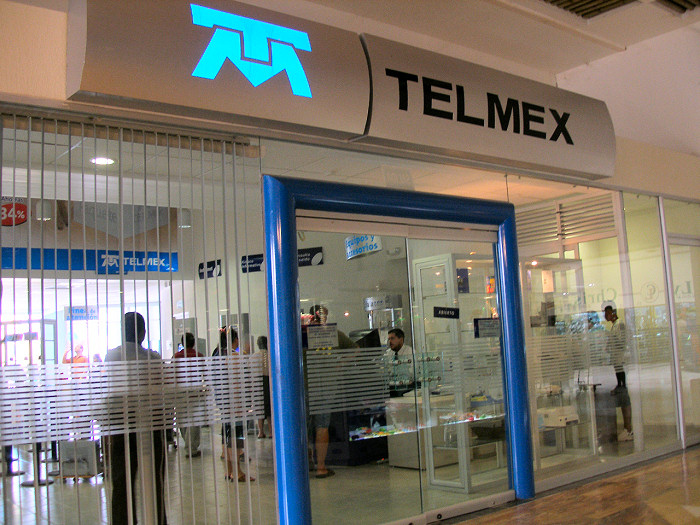
Telmex retail store in Puerto Vallarta

Mass media in Mexico, including telecommunications and digital media, are regulated primarily by the Secretariat of Communications and Transportation (Secretaría de Comunicaciones y Transportes, SCT) and the autonomous Federal Telecommunications Institute (Instituto Federal de Telecomunicaciones, IFT), which replaced the former Federal Commission of Telecommunications (Cofetel) in 2013. Mexico's telecommunications market is among the largest in Latin America and underwent significant liberalization in the 1990s following the privatization of the state-owned monopoly Teléfonos de México (Telmex), acquired by Carlos Slim's América Móvil group in 1990. Despite liberalization, Telmex continued to dominate fixed-line telecommunications and broadband internet access sectors for decades. By 2023, its fixed broadband market share had declined from 51.7% in 2019 to 38.6%, reflecting growing competition from operators like Totalplay, Megacable, and Izzi.

Digital and mobile internet access has accelerated media diversification, with over 90% of users accessing the internet via mobile devices as of 2024. Social media platforms such as Facebook, Twitter, and TikTok have become primary sources of news and political commentary, contributing to media pluralism and facilitating investigative journalism and independent reporting. Nonetheless, challenges persist including political interference, disinformation campaigns, and urban-rural disparities in broadband access. In 2024, the IFT imposed a record fine of ₱1.78 billion pesos on Telcel for monopolistic practices before its powers were transferred to the newly created Agency for Digital Transformation and Telecommunications (ATDT), as part of controversial institutional reforms.

== Regulation ==
Founded on 13 May 1891, as the Secretariat of Communications and Public Works, the SCT is divided into three subsecretariats: the Subsecretariat of Infrastructure, the Subsecretariat of Communications and the Subsecretariat of Transportation.

The SCT has ceded many of its regulatory functions to the Federal Telecommunications Institute.

== Radio and television ==
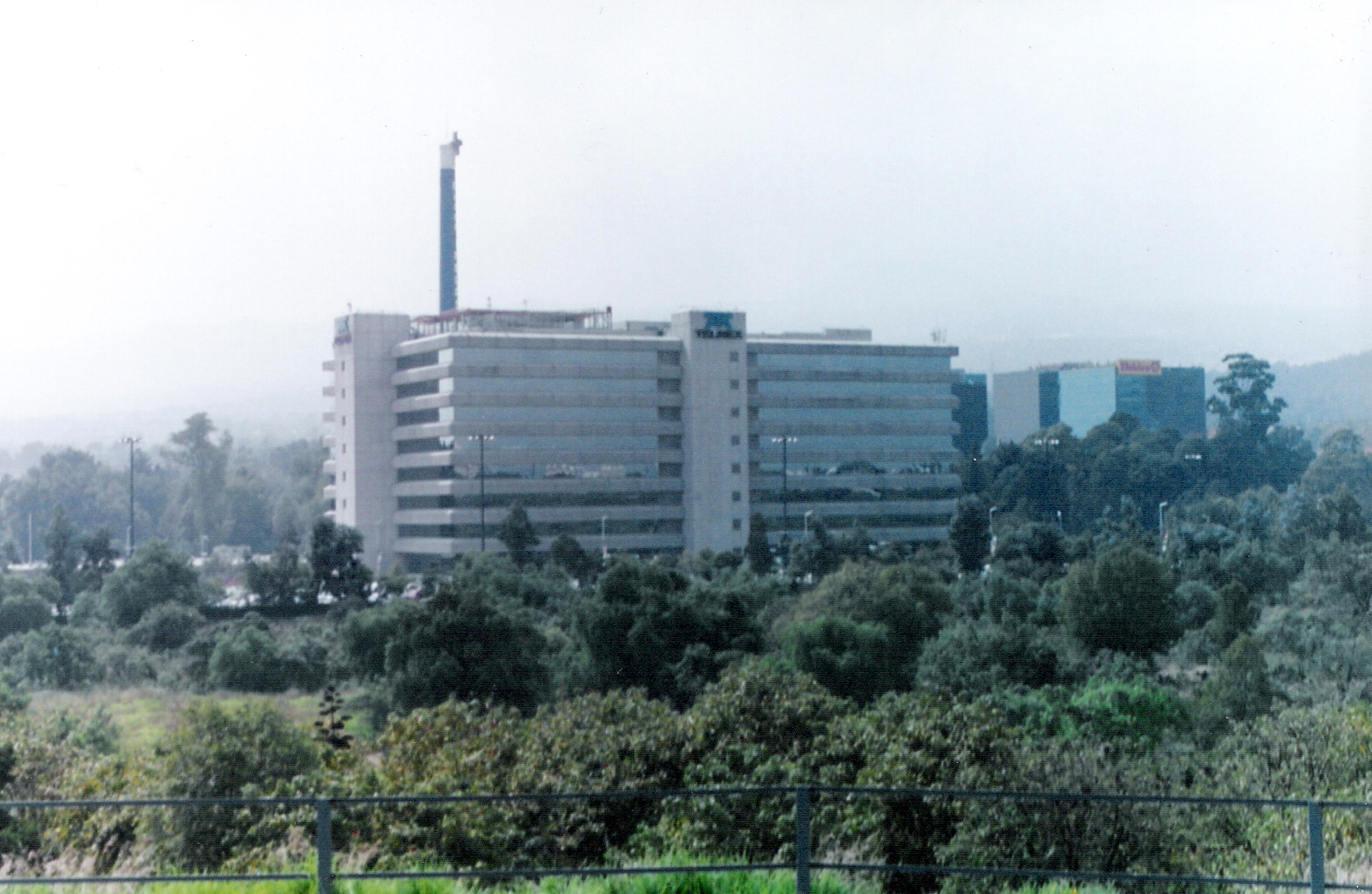
Building of Telmex in Mexico City, located next to the Cuicuilco ecological reserve.

Usage of radio, television and Internet in Mexico nowadays is prevalent. The first television transmission in Mexico was conducted by Javier Stavoli in 1931. Guillermo González Camarena built his own monochromatic camera in 1934, and in 1940 he developed the first trichromatic system and obtained the first patent for color television in the world. After developing radio and television stations, in 1948, he built the studio Gon-Cam, which was considered the best television system in the world in the time, according to survey conducted by the Columbia College of Chicago.

With the passage of the century, the television broadcasting market became dominated by two powerful companies, Televisa—the largest Spanish media company in the Spanish-speaking world — and TV Azteca, even though several dozen regional networks operate in the country. In addition, many states have their own television networks, and public television has increased its market penetration in recent years. In 2014 there were 1,762 radio stations and 1,063 separately licensed analog and digital television stations.

== Telephone and Internet ==
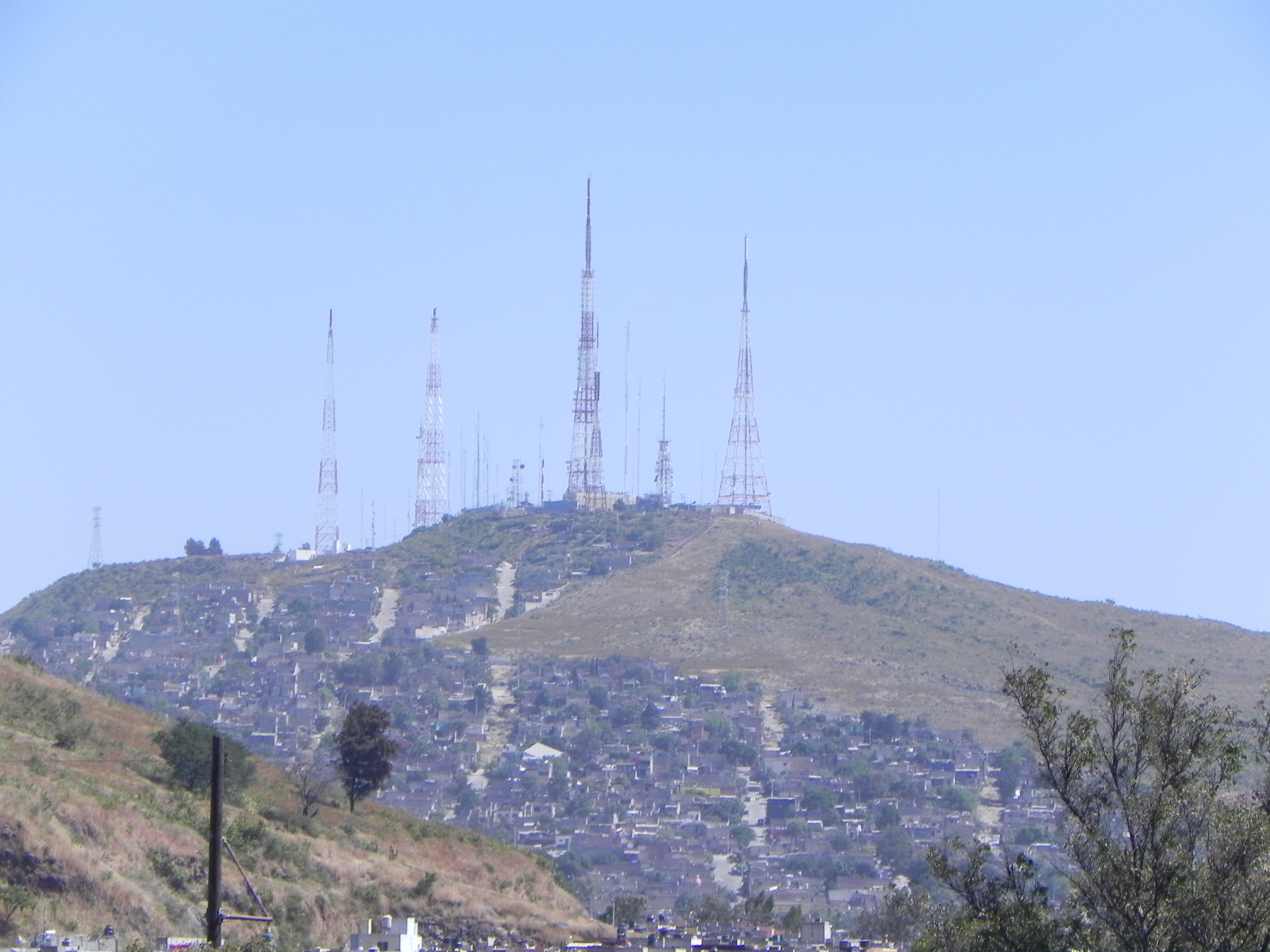
Broadcast relay station Guadalajara.

In general, the telecommunications industry is mostly dominated by Telmex (Teléfonos de México) and América Móvil. The telecommunications industry was privatized in 1990 under the control of Grupo Carso and since 1996 under Carlos Slim. Telmex has diversified its operations by incorporating Internet service and mobile telephony. It has also expanded its operations to Colombia, Peru, Chile, Argentina, Brazil, Uruguay, Ecuador and the United States. Due to Mexican diverse orography—the country is crossed by two high altitude mountain ranges extending from the Rocky Mountains—providing landline telephone service at remote mountainous areas is expensive, and penetration of line-phones per capita is low compared to other Latin American countries, with 20 million lines.

Mobile telephony has the advantage of reaching all areas at a lower cost, due to reduced investments in required infrastructure, and the total number of mobile lines in Mexico is nearly five times that of landlines, with an estimated 95 million lines. The telecommunications industry is regulated by the government through the Federal Telecommunications Institute (IFT, Instituto Federal de Telecomunicaciones).

In April 2009, the ITESM (Instituto Tecnológico y de Estudios Superiores de Monterrey) reported 25,217,500 users; 78% of personal computer Internet access is broadband access., ranking ninth in the world. November 2019, Spanish telecoms giant Telefónica signed a deal to use some of AT&T's infrastructure in Mexico.

== Satellite communications ==
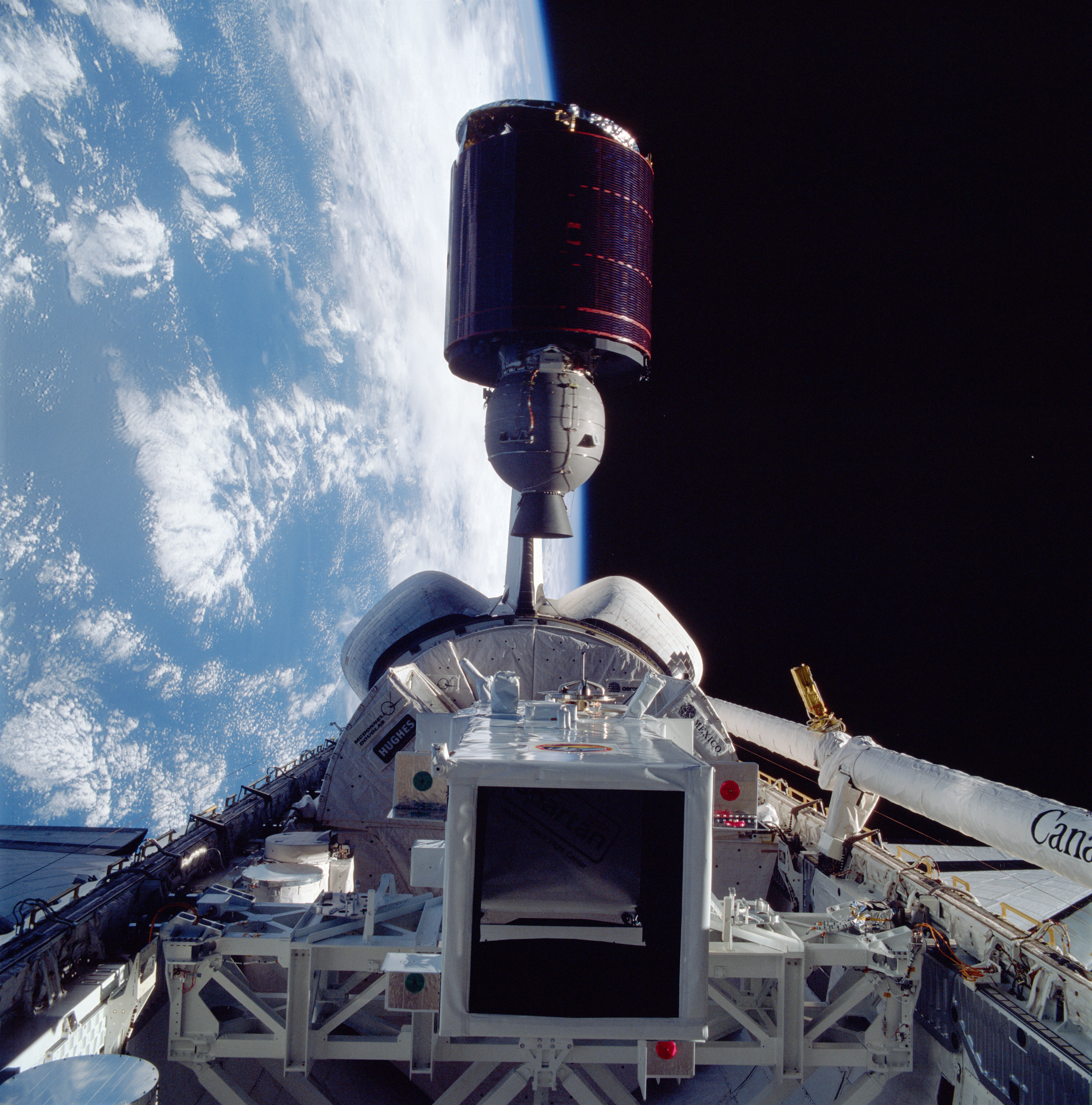
Mexico's Morelos satellite deploying from Discovery's payload bay.

The satellite system is domestic with 120 earth stations. There is also extensive microwave radio relay network and considerable use of fiber-optic and coaxial cable.

Mexican satellites are operated by Satélites Mexicanos (Satmex), a leading private company in Latin America which services both North and South America. Satmex offers broadcast, telephone, and telecommunication services to 37 countries in the Americas, from Canada to Argentina. Through business partnerships, Satmex provides high-speed connectivity to ISPs and Digital Broadcast Services. The system is currently composed of three main satellites: Solidaridad 2, Satmex 5 and Satmex 6.

The Secretariat of Communications and Transportation is also in the process of deploying the Mexican Satellite System (MEXSAT), but a launch failure has postponed the project.

== See also ==
- Transportation in Mexico
- Economy of Mexico
