= Horizons-2 =

Communications satellite

- Mission type: Communications
- Operator: Intelsat/SKY Perfect JSAT Group
- COSPAR ID: 2007-063B
- SATCAT no.: 32388
- Mission duration: 15 years

Spacecraft properties
- Bus: STAR-2
- Manufacturer: Orbital Sciences
- Launch mass: 2,350 kilograms (5,180 lb)

Start of mission
- Launch date: 21 December 2007, 21:41:55 UTC
- Rocket: Ariane 5GS
- Launch site: Kourou ELA-3
- Contractor: Arianespace

Orbital parameters
- Reference system: Geocentric
- Regime: Geostationary
- Longitude: 74° west (2008-2011); 84.9° east (2011—)

Transponders
- Band: 20 Ku-band
- Coverage area: Continental United States; Caribbean; Canada
- EIRP: 3.5 kilowatts (minimum EOL)

Horizons-2 is a K_{u} band communications satellite owned by Horizons Satellite, a joint venture between SKY Perfect JSAT Group and Intelsat. Its orbital slot is located at 74° west longitude.

== Launch ==
Horizons-2 was launched from the Guiana Space Centre—along with the Rascom-QAF 1 spacecraft—aboard an Arianespace Ariane 5-GS. Launch occurred at 21:42 GMT on 21 December 2007.

== Platform and payload ==
Horizons-2 was built by Orbital Sciences Corporation based on its STAR-2 satellite platform, which will generate 3.5 kilowatts of payload power by means of two solar arrays, each equipped with three panels of UJT gallium arsenide cells. The solar arrays charge two lithium ion batteries with capacities of at least 3,850 watt-hours.

The spacecraft is 3-axis stabilized, with a zero momentum system. Hydrazine-fuelled monopropellant thrusters are used for stationkeeping, with an IHI BT-4 bipropellant engine used for insertion into geostationary orbit. It has a design life of 15 years; however, it is fuelled for at least 16 years of operations. Its payload consists of 20 Ku-band transponders broadcasting through two 2.3-meter (7.5 ft) dual gridded shaped reflectors.
It has 16 active transponders with 22-for-16 redundant 85 W TWTAs and four active transponders with 6-for-4 redundant 150 W TWTAs. The satellite will provide service to the continental United States, the Caribbean and parts of Canada.
