= GEOStar-2 =

Satellite model made by Northrop Grumman

The STAR-2 Bus is a fully redundant, flight-proven, spacecraft bus designed for geosynchronous missions.

It is a satellite platform, designed and developed by Thomas van der Heyden for the Indonesian Cakrawarta satellite program in the early 1990s, now manufactured by Northrop Grumman Innovation Systems with an apogee kick motor to place a communications satellite into geostationary orbit, a thruster to provide the satellite with orbital station-keeping for a 15-year mission, and solar arrays to provide the satellite payload with 5 kW of electrical power.

== Advantages ==
NGIS's GEOStar-2 bus design is unique within the satellite industry. NGIS's GEOStar-2 bus provides an affordable low-to-medium power satellite platform that is ideal for missions of this size. Rather than being a less efficient version of a larger, heavier product, NGIS's GEOStar-2 bus is designed specifically for the 1000 to 5550 watts payload class.

== Design ==
The GEOStar-2 bus satellite is a modular, mass efficient structure, designed for simplified integration to reduce manufacturing cycle times. The structure is supported by a composite thrust cylinder, to which the bus, payload, nadir and base panels are connected. Energy from two multi-panel solar wings and lithium-ion batteries is electronically processed to provide 36 volts regulated power to the satellite throughout the mission. All active units aboard the satellite are connected through a 1553 data bus. Commands and telemetry are processed through the flight software resident on the flight processor, which provides robust autonomous control to all GEOStar-2 satellites. The modularity of the structure and the standard 1553 interfaces allow parallel assembly and test of the bus and payload systems, reducing manufacturing schedule risk by minimizing the time spent in serial satellite integration and test flow. GEOStar-2 is designed for missions up to 15 years in duration. The propulsion system is sized for ten years of station keeping in geosynchronous orbit. Built-in radiation hardness for the severe geosynchronous environment is achieved through conservative selection of electronic parts. Several available options augment the basic bus to provide improved pointing, more payload power, secure communications, higher downlink data rates or enhanced payload computing power.

=== Structure ===
- Bus Dimensions (H x W x L): 1.75 x 1.7 x 1.8 m
- Construction: Composite/Al

=== Power subsystem ===
- Payload Power: Up to 5550 watts orbit average at 15 years
- Bus Voltage: 24-36 VDC (nominal)
- Solar Arrays: multi-junction GaAs cells
- Batteries: lithium-ion

=== Attitude control subsystem ===
- Stability Mode: 3-axis; zero momentum
- Propulsion Subsystem
- Transfer Orbit System: liquid bi-propellant
- On Orbit: monopropellant (hydrazine)

=== Command and data handling subsystem ===
- Flight Processor: MIL-STD-1750A
- Interface Architecture: MIL-STD-1553B, CCSDS

== Payload support ==
While primary applications are Fixed-Satellite Services (FSS) and Broadcast Satellite Services (BSS), the GEOStar-2 bus can be adapted for MSS, Earth and space science applications, as well as for technology demonstration or risk reduction programs. Depending on mission duration requirements, the GEOStar-2 bus can accommodate payloads in excess of 500 kilograms, and provide up to 5550 watts of power. Instrument data can be provided in standard format such as CCSDS or through secured encryption, as approved by the National Security Agency (NSA).

=== Shared launch opportunities ===
Due to the size and mass envelope of the satellite, the GEOStar-2 bus is compatible with almost all commercially available launch vehicles, maximizing opportunity for launch and access to space. While dedicated or single launch services are more readily available, the GEOStar-2 bus targets shared launch opportunities, where launch cost and launch-sharing opportunities are favorable.

=== Mission services ===
Customers can purchase the GEOStar-2 bus spacecraft bus alone, or as part of a turn-key service that includes an integrated payload, network operations center and launch vehicle. NGIS conducts spacecraft commissioning from its own ground station prior to transferring spacecraft control to the customer's operations center.

== Satellite orders ==
Satellite	Country	Operator	Type	Transponders	Launch date (UTC)	Rocket	Changes	Status
AMC-21	United States	SES Americom	Television broadcasting	24 Ku-band	14 August 2008	Ariane 5 ECA		Active
Amazonas 4A	Spain	Hispasat	Communications	24 Ku-band	14 August 2008	Ariane 5 ECA		Active
Azerspace-1/Africasat-1a	Azerbaijan	Azercosmos	Communications	24 C-band, 12 Ku-band	7 February 2013	Ariane 5 ECA		Active
Eutelsat 5 West B	International	Eutelsat	Communications	35 Ku-band	9 October 2019	Proton-M; Phase 4		Active
Galaxy 12	United States	PanAmSat	Television broadcasting	20-24 C-band	9 April 2003	Ariane 5 G		Active
Galaxy 14	United States	PanAmSat	Television broadcasting	20-24 C-band	13 August 2005	Soyuz-FG		Active
Galaxy 15	United States	PanAmSat	Television broadcasting	20-24 C-band	13 October 2005	Ariane 5 GS		Active
Galaxy 30	United States	Intelsat	Television broadcasting	C-band, Ku-band, Ka-band, and WAAS payload	15 August 2020	Ariane 5 ECA		Active
Horizons-2	United States, Japan	PanAmSat, SKY Perfect JSAT	Communications	20 Ku-band	21 December 2007	Ariane 5 GS		Active
HYLAS 2	United Kingdom	Avanti Communications	Satellite internet	24 Ka-band	2 August 2012	Ariane 5 ECA		Active
Intelsat 11	United States	Intelsat	Communications	16 C-band, 18 Ka-band	5 October 2007	Ariane 5 GS	Formerly PAS 11	Active
Intelsat 15	United States	Intelsat	Communications	22 Ku-band	30 November 2009	Zenit-3SLB		Active
Intelsat 16	United States	Intelsat	Communications	24 Ku-band	12 February 2010	Proton-M; Phase 1	Formerly PAS 11R	Active
Intelsat 18	United States	Intelsat	Communications	24 C-band, 12 Ku-band	5 October 2011	Zenit-3SLB		Active
Intelsat 23	United States	Intelsat	Communications	24 C-band, 15 Ku-band	14 October 2012	Proton-M; Phase 3		Active
Koreasat 6	South Korea	KT Corporation	Television broadcasting	30 Ku-band	29 December 2010	Ariane 5 ECA		Active
MEASAT-3a	Malaysia	MEASAT Satellite Systems	Television broadcasting	12 C-band, 12 Ku-band	21 June 2009	Zenit-3SLB		Active
Mexsat-3	Mexico	Mexican Satellite System	Mobile communications	12 C-band, 12 Ku-band	19 December 2012	Ariane 5 ECA		Active
N-STAR c	Japan	NTT Docomo	Mobile communications	1 C-band, 20 S-band	5 July 2002	Ariane 5 G		Retired
New Dawn	United States	Intelsat	Television broadcasting	28 C-band, 24 Ku-band	22 April 2011	Ariane 5 ECA	Known as Intelsat 28	Active
NSS-9	Netherlands	SES World Skies	Communications	28 C-band	12 February 2009	Ariane 5 ECA		Active
Optus D1	Australia	Optus	Television broadcasting	24 Ku-band	13 October 2006	Ariane 5 ECA		Active
Optus D2	Australia	Optus	Television broadcasting	24 Ku-band	5 October 2007	Ariane 5 GS		Active
Optus D3	Australia	Optus	Television broadcasting	24 Ku-band	21 August 2009	Ariane 5 ECA		Active
SES-1	United States	SES Americom	Communications	24 C-band, 24 Ku-band, 2 Ka-band	24 April 2010	Proton-M; Phase 2	Formerly AMC-4R	Active
SES-2 and CHIRP (Commercially Hosted InfraRed Payload)	United States	SES Americom	Communications	24 C-band, 24 Ku-band, 2 Ka-band	21 September 2011	Ariane 5 ECA	Formerly AMC-5R	Active
SES-3	United States	SES Americom	Communications	24 C-band, 24 Ku-band, 2 Ka-band	15 July 2011	Proton-M; Phase 3		Active
SES-8	Luxembourg	SES	Television broadcasting	33 Ku-band	3 December 2013	Falcon 9		Active
Sky-Mexico 1	Mexico	DirecTV	Television broadcasting	24 Ku-band, 2 R-band	27 May 2015	Ariane 5 ECA	Known as SKYM 1	Active
Star One C3	Brazil	Star One	Communications	28 C-band, 16 Ku-band	10 November 2012	Ariane 5 ECA		Active
Telkom-2	Indonesia	Telkom Indonesia	Communications	24 C-band	16 November 2005	Ariane 5 ECA		Retired
Thaicom 6	Thailand	Thaicom	Communications	24 C-band, 9 Ku-band	6 January 2014	Falcon 9	Known as AfriCom 1	Active
Thaicom 8	Thailand	Thaicom	Communications	24 Ku-band	27 May 2016	Falcon 9		Active
Thor 5	Norway	Telenor	Television broadcasting	24 Ku-band	11 February 2008	Proton-M; Phase 3		Active

== See also ==
- Star Bus
- GEOStar
- Northrop Grumman Innovation Systems
