= List of Ariane launches (2010–2019) =

This is a list of launches performed or scheduled to be performed by Ariane carrier rockets between 2010 and 2019. Since 2004, only the Ariane 5 is in service, operating in the ECA and ES configurations. The last Ariane 5 ES flew in 2018. The ECA version has flown until 2023 and will soon complete the transition to the Ariane 6.

== Launch statistics ==
=== Rocket configurations ===
- Ariane 5 ES
- Ariane 5 ECA
- Ariane 5 ECA+

=== Launch outcomes ===
- Failure
- Partial failure
- Success

== Launch history ==
Source: Arianespace Press Kits

=== 2010 ===
Flight No.	Date Time (UTC)	Rocket type Serial No.	Launch site	Payload	Payload mass	Orbit	Customers	Launch outcome
V-194	21 May 2010; 22:01	Ariane 5 ECA; 551	Guiana; ELA-3	Astra 3B; COMSATBw-2	9,116 kg	GTO	SES; MilSat Services	Success
V-195	26 June 2010; 21:41	Ariane 5 ECA; 552	Guiana; ELA-3	Arabsat-5A; Chollian	8,393 kg	GTO	Arabsat; KARI	Success
V-196	4 August 2010; 20:59	Ariane 5 ECA; 554	Guiana; ELA-3	Nilesat-201; RASCOM-QAF 1R	7,085 kg	GTO	Nilesat; RASCOM	Success
V-197	28 October 2010; 21:51	Ariane 5 ECA; 555	Guiana; ELA-3	Eutelsat W3B; BSAT-3b	8,263 kg	GTO	Eutelsat; B-SAT	Success
V-197	Eutelsat W3B suffered leak in the propulsion system shortly after launch and was declared total loss. BSAT-3b, however, is operating normally.							
V-198	26 November 2010; 18:39	Ariane 5 ECA; 556	Guiana; ELA-3	Intelsat 17; HYLAS-1	8,867 kg	GTO	Intelsat; Avanti Communications	Success
V-199	29 December 2010; 21:27	Ariane 5 ECA; 557	Guiana; ELA-3	Koreasat 6 Hispasat-1E	9,259 kg	GTO	KT Corporation; Hispasat	Success
=== 2011 ===
Flight No.	Date Time (UTC)	Rocket type Serial No.	Launch site	Payload	Payload mass	Orbit	Customers	Launch outcome
V-200	16 February 2011; 21:50	Ariane 5 ES; 544	Guiana; ELA-3	Johannes Kepler ATV	20,050 kg	LEO	ESA	Success
V-200	ISS resupply flight.							
VA-201	22 April 2011; 21:37	Ariane 5 ECA; 558	Guiana; ELA-3	Yahsat 1A; New Dawn	10,064 kg	GTO	AlYahsat; Intelsat	Success
VA-201	Launch was scrubbed from 30 March due to Vulcain main engine gimbal malfunction that caused launch abort in the last seconds before liftoff.							
VA-202	20 May 2011; 20:38	Ariane 5 ECA; 559	Guiana; ELA-3	ST-2; GSAT-8	9,013 kg	GTO	Singapore Telecom; ISRO	Success
VA-203	6 August 2011; 22:52	Ariane 5 ECA; 560	Guiana; ELA-3	Astra 1N; BSAT-3c; JCSAT-110R	9,095 kg	GTO	SES; B-SAT	Success
VA-204	21 September 2011; 21:38	Ariane 5 ECA; 561	Guiana; ELA-3	Arabsat-5C; SES-2	8,974 kg	GTO	Arabsat; SES	Success
=== 2012 ===
Flight No.	Date Time (UTC)	Rocket type Serial No.	Launch site	Payload	Payload mass	Orbit	Customers	Launch outcome
VA-205	23 March 2012; 04:34	Ariane 5 ES; 553	Guiana; ELA-3	Edoardo Amaldi ATV	20,060 kg	LEO	ESA	Success
VA-205	ISS resupply flight.							
VA-206	15 May 2012; 22:13	Ariane 5 ECA; 562	Guiana; ELA-3	JCSAT-13; Vinasat-2	8,381 kg	GTO	JSAT; VNPT	Success
VA-207	5 July 2012; 21:36	Ariane 5 ECA; 563	Guiana; ELA-3	EchoStar XVII; MSG-3	9,647 kg	GTO	EchoStar; EUMETSAT	Success
VA-208	2 August 2012; 20:54	Ariane 5 ECA; 564	Guiana; ELA-3	Intelsat 20; HYLAS 2	10,182 kg	GTO	Intelsat; Avanti Communications	Success
VA-209	28 September 2012; 21:18	Ariane 5 ECA; 565	Guiana; ELA-3	Astra 2F; GSAT-10	10,211 kg	GTO	SES; ISRO	Success
VA-210	10 November 2012; 21:05	Ariane 5 ECA; 566	Guiana; ELA-3	Eutelsat 21B; Star One C3	9,216 kg	GTO	Eutelsat; Star One	Success
VA-211	19 December 2012; 21:49	Ariane 5 ECA; 567	Guiana; ELA-3	Skynet 5D; MEXSAT-3	8,637 kg	GTO	Astrium; MEXSAT	Success
=== 2013 ===
Flight No.	Date Time (UTC)	Rocket type Serial No.	Launch site	Payload	Payload mass	Orbit	Customers	Launch outcome
VA-212	7 February 2013; 21:36	Ariane 5 ECA; 568	Guiana; ELA-3	Amazonas-3; Azerspace-1/Africasat-1a	10,350 kg	GTO	Hispasat; Azercosmos	Success
VA-213	5 June 2013; 21:52	Ariane 5 ES; 592	Guiana; ELA-3	Albert Einstein ATV	20,252 kg	LEO	ESA	Success
VA-213	ISS resupply flight.							
VA-214	25 July 2013; 19:54	Ariane 5 ECA; 569	Guiana; ELA-3	Alphasat I-XL; INSAT-3D	9,760 kg	GTO	Inmarsat; ISRO	Success
VA-215	29 August 2013; 20:30	Ariane 5 ECA; 570	Guiana; ELA-3	Eutelsat 25B/Es'hail 1 GSAT-7	9,790 kg	GTO	Eutelsat; ISRO	Success
=== 2014 ===
Flight No.	Date Time (UTC)	Rocket type Serial No.	Launch site	Payload	Payload mass	Orbit	Customers	Launch outcome
VA-217	6 February 2014; 21:30	Ariane 5 ECA; 572	Guiana; ELA-3	ABS-2; Athena-Fidus	10,214 kg	GTO	DIRISI	Success
VA-216	22 March 2014; 22:04	Ariane 5 ECA; 571	Guiana; ELA-3	Astra 5B; Amazonas 4A	9,579 kg	GTO	SES; Hispasat	Success
VA-219	29 July 2014; 23:47	Ariane 5 ES; 593	Guiana; ELA-3	Georges Lemaître ATV	20,293 kg	LEO	ESA	Success
VA-219	ISS resupply flight. Final launch of the Automated Transfer Vehicle.							
VA-218	11 September 2014; 22:05	Ariane 5 ECA; 573	Guiana; ELA-3	MEASAT 3b Optus 10	10,088 kg	GTO	MEASAT Satellite Systems; Optus	Success
VA-220	16 October 2014; 21:43	Ariane 5 ECA; 574	Guiana; ELA-3	Intelsat 30; ARSAT-1	10,060 kg	GTO	Intelsat; AR-SAT	Success
VA-221	6 December 2014; 20:40	Ariane 5 ECA; 575	Guiana; ELA-3	DirecTV-14; GSAT-16	10,210 kg	GTO	DirecTV; ISRO	Success
=== 2015 ===
Flight No.	Date Time (UTC)	Rocket type Serial No.	Launch site	Payload	Payload mass	Orbit	Customers	Launch outcome
VA-222	26 April 2015; 20:00	Ariane 5 ECA; 576	Guiana; ELA-3	Thor 7 SICRAL-2	9,852 kg	GTO	British Satellite Broadcasting; French Armed Forces	Success
VA-223	27 May 2015; 21:16	Ariane 5 ECA; 577	Guiana; ELA-3	DirecTV-15; Sky Mexico 1	9,960 kg	GTO	DirecTV; Sky México	Success
VA-224	15 July 2015; 21:42	Ariane 5 ECA; 578	Guiana; ELA-3	Star One C4; MSG-4	8,587 kg	GTO	Star One; EUMETSAT	Success
VA-225	20 August 2015; 20:34	Ariane 5 ECA; 579	Guiana; ELA-3	Eutelsat 8 West B Intelsat 34	9,922 kg	GTO	Eutelsat; Intelsat	Success
VA-226	30 September 2015; 20:30	Ariane 5 ECA; 580	Guiana; ELA-3	NBN Co 1A; ARSAT-2	10,203 kg	GTO	National Broadband Network; ARSAT	Success
VA-227	10 November 2015; 21:34	Ariane 5 ECA; 581	Guiana; ELA-3	Arabsat 6B; GSAT-15	9,810 kg	GTO	Arabsat; ISRO	Success
=== 2016 ===
Flight No.	Date Time (UTC)	Rocket type Serial No.	Launch site	Payload	Payload mass	Orbit	Customers	Launch outcome
VA-228	27 January 2016, 23:20	Ariane 5 ECA; 583	Guiana; ELA-3	Intelsat 29e	6,700 kg	GTO	Intelsat	Success
VA-229	9 March 2016, 05:20	Ariane 5 ECA; 582	Guiana; ELA-3	Eutelsat 65 West A	6,707 kg	GTO	Eutelsat	Success
VA-230	18 June 2016, 21:38	Ariane 5 ECA; 584	Guiana; ELA-3	EchoStar 18; BRISat	10,730 kg	GTO	EchoStar; Bank Rakyat Indonesia	Success
VA-230	This mission carried the first satellite owned by a financial institution.							
VA-232	24 August 2016, 22:16	Ariane 5 ECA; 586	Guiana; ELA-3	Intelsat 33e Intelsat 36	10,735 kg	GTO	Intelsat	Success
VA-232	Intelsat 33e's LEROS apogee engine, which supposed to perform orbit raising, failed soon after its successful launch, forcing to use the experimentation of low-thrust reaction control system which extended the commissioning time 3 months longer than expected. Later, it suffered other thruster problems which cut its operational life time for about 3.5 years. On 19 October 2024 Intelsat 33e disintegrated in orbit and was declared a total loss by Intelsat.							
VA-231	5 October 2016; 20:30	Ariane 5 ECA; 585	Guiana; ELA-3	NBN Co 1B; GSAT-18	10,663 kg	GTO	National Broadband Network; INSAT	Success
VA-233	17 November 2016; 13:06	Ariane 5 ES; 594	Guiana; ELA-3	Galileo FOC-M6 (satellites FM-7, 12, 13, 14)	3,290 kg	MEO	ESA	Success
VA-233	Part of the Galileo satellite navigation system. First Galileo launch on Ariane 5 and from a launch vehicle besides Soyuz.							
VA-234	21 December 2016; 20:30	Ariane 5 ECA; 587	Guiana; ELA-3	Star One D1; JCSAT-15	10,722 kg	GTO	Star One; SKY Perfect JSAT Group	Success
=== 2017 ===
Flight No.	Date Time (UTC)	Rocket type Serial No.	Launch site	Payload	Payload mass	Orbit	Customers	Launch outcome
VA-235	14 February 2017; 21:39	Ariane 5 ECA; 588	Guiana; ELA-3	Intelsat 32e / SkyBrasil-1; Telkom 3S	10,485 kg	GTO	Intelsat, DirecTV Latin America; Telkom Indonesia	Success
VA-235	This mission carried the first Intelsat Epic^{NG} satellite based on the Eurostar E3000 platform, while other Intelsat Epic^{NG} satellites were based on BSS-702MP platform.							
VA-236	4 May 2017; 21:50	Ariane 5 ECA; 589	Guiana; ELA-3	Koreasat 7 SGDC-1	10,289 kg	GTO	KT Corporation; SGDC	Success
VA-236	The launch was delayed from March 2017 due to transportation to the launch site being restricted by a blockade erected by striking workers.							
VA-237	1 June 2017; 23:45	Ariane 5 ECA; 590	Guiana; ELA-3	ViaSat 2 Eutelsat 172B	10,865 kg	GTO	ViaSat; Eutelsat	Success
VA-237	Heaviest and most expensive commercial payload ever put into orbit, valued at approximately $800 million (~$1 billion including the rocket), until 12 June 2019, when Falcon 9 delivered RADARSAT Constellation with three Canadian satellites, valued almost €844 million (not including the launch vehicle), into orbit. ViaSat-2 suffered antenna glitch, which cut about 15% of its intended throughput.							
VA-238	28 June 2017; 21:15	Ariane 5 ECA; 591	Guiana; ELA-3	EuropaSat; Hellas Sat 3 GSAT-17	10,177 kg	GTO	Hellas Sat; INSAT	Success
VA-239	29 September 2017; 21:56	Ariane 5 ECA; 5100	Guiana; ELA-3	Intelsat 37e BSAT-4a	10,838 kg	GTO	Intelsat; B-SAT	Success
VA-239	Launch was scrubbed from 5 September due to electrical fault in one of the solid rocket boosters that caused launch abort in the last seconds before liftoff.							
VA-240	12 December 2017, 18:36	Ariane 5 ES; 595	Guiana; ELA-3	Galileo FOC-M7 (satellites FM-15, 16, 17, 18)	3,282 kg	MEO	ESA	Success
VA-240	The four satellites were accommodated inside the medium version of the upper stage fairing. The satellites, numbered SAT 19-20-21-22 and built by OHB System in Bremen, Germany, for the European Commission's Galileo programme under the supervision of the ESA, had a mass at liftoff of about 715 kilograms (1,576 lb) each, that is a total of approximately 2,860 kilograms (6,310 lb). The mission was planned to last 4 hours, 40 minutes and 52 seconds, placing the two pairs of satellites into their medium Earth orbit, at an altitude of about 22,922 kilometres (14,243 mi) and an inclination of about 57 degrees.							
=== 2018 ===
Flight No.	Date Time (UTC)	Rocket type Serial No.	Launch site	Payload	Payload mass	Orbit	Customers	Launch outcome
VA-241	25 January 2018; 22:20	Ariane 5 ECA; 5101	Guiana; ELA-3	SES-14 with GOLD; Al Yah 3	9,123 kg	Super-GTO	SES, NASA; AlYahsat	Partial failure
VA-241	Telemetry from the launch vehicle was lost after 9 minutes 30 seconds into the flight, after rocket trajectory went off course due to invalid inertial units' azimuth value. Satellites later found to have separated from the upper stage and entered an incorrect orbit with large inclination deviations. However, they were able to reach the planned orbit with small loss of on board propellant for SES-14 and still expected to meet the designed life time, but with significant loss on Al Yah 3 (up to 50% of its intended operational life).							
VA-242	5 April 2018; 21:34	Ariane 5 ECA; 5102	Guiana; ELA-3	Superbird-8 / DSN-1; HYLAS-4	10,260 kg	GTO	Japanese Ministry of Defense, SKY Perfect JSAT Group; Avanti Communications	Success
VA-242	Return-to-flight mission after VA-241 mishap in 25 January, and the first Arianespace launch following the mishap. The launcher was carrying the DSN-1/Superbird-8 and HYLAS-4 geostationary satellites. The satellites were accommodated together on the SYLDA adapter inside the long version of the upper stage fairing. The mission was planned to last 33 minutes and 56 seconds, placing both satellites into a geostationary transfer orbit, with an apogee of about 35,786 kilometres (22,236 mi) and a perigee of about 250 kilometres (160 mi), at an inclination of about 3 degrees. Superbird-8 was in the upper position. It had a mass at liftoff of about 5,348 kilograms (11,790 lb). The satellite was supposed to launch in mid-2016, but due to overpressurization within the container during shipping to the launch site that caused significant damage, the satellite was returned to the manufacturer for repair work and additional testing, delaying the launch for almost two years. HYLAS-4 was in the lower position. It had a mass at liftoff of approximately 4,050 kilograms (8,930 lb).							
VA-243	25 September 2018; 22:38	Ariane 5 ECA; 5103	Guiana; ELA-3	Horizons-3e; Azerspace-2 / Intelsat 38	10,827 kg	GTO	Intelsat, SKY Perfect JSAT Group; Azercosmos	Success
VA-243	Hundredth Ariane 5 mission. Flight VA-243 was delayed from 25 May due to issues with GSAT-11, which was eventually replaced by Horizons-3e. The satellites were accommodated inside the long version of the upper stage fairing on the SYLDA adapter. Horizons-3e had a liftoff mass of about 6,441 kilograms (14,200 lb) and was operated from the 169° East position. It was Boeing's 56th, Intelsat's 60th and SKY Perfect JSAT's 20th spacecraft to be launched by Arianespace. Azerspace-2, also known as Intelsat 38, had a liftoff mass of about 3,500 kilograms (7,700 lb). Azerbaijan’s second geostationary satellite would expand Azerspace-1's capacity while replacing Intelsat 12 from the 45° East position. It was SSL's 65th and Intelsat's 61st spacecraft to be launched by Arianespace. The mission was planned to last 42 minutes and 17 seconds, placing both the satellites into geostationary transfer orbits with a perigee altitude of about 250 kilometres (160 mi) and apogee of 35,726 kilometres (22,199 mi) and an inclination of about 6 degrees.							
VA-244	25 July 2018; 11:25	Ariane 5 ES; 596	Guiana; ELA-3	Galileo FOC-M8 (satellites FM-19, 20, 21, 22)	2,952 kg	MEO	ESA	Success
VA-244	Final flight of Ariane 5ES. The satellites were accommodated inside the medium version of the upper stage fairing. They were built by OHB System in Bremen, Germany, for the European Commission's Galileo programme under the supervision of the ESA. They were assigned to the constellation's orbital plane B to provide additional coverage and performance to the now complete initial constellation composed of 24 operational satellites plus two in-orbit spares, all of which having been put into orbit by Arianespace. The satellites, numbered 23, 24, 25 and 26, are named after children who won the European Commission's Galileo drawing competition: Tara, Samuel, Anna and Ellen, respectively. The mission was planned to last 3 hours, 56 minutes and 54 seconds, placing the two pairs of satellites into their medium Earth orbit, at an altitude of about 22,922 kilometres (14,243 mi) (corresponding to a semi-major axis of 29,300 kilometres (18,200 mi), 300 kilometres (190 mi) below Galileo operational orbit) and an inclination of about 56 degrees.							
VA-245	20 October 2018; 01:45	Ariane 5 ECA; 5105	Guiana; ELA-3	BepiColombo	4,081 kg	Heliocentric	ESA; JAXA	Success
VA-246	4 December 2018; 20:37	Ariane 5 ECA; 5104	Guiana; ELA-3	GSAT-11; GEO-KOMPSAT-2A	9,362 kg	GTO	ISRO; KARI	Success
=== 2019 ===
Flight No.	Date Time (UTC)	Rocket type Serial No.	Launch site	Payload	Payload mass	Orbit	Customers	Launch outcome
VA-247	5 February 2019; 21:01	Ariane 5 ECA; 5106	Guiana; ELA-3	GSAT-31; Hellas Sat 4 / SaudiGeoSat 1	9,031 kg	GTO	ISRO; Hellas Sat	Success
VA-247	It was the 103rd launch of Ariane 5, the 1st in 2019, and the 306th Arianespace mission. The payloads of the flight were adapted together onto the SYLDA adapter inside the long version of the upper stage fairing. The total payload mass was approximately 10,018 kilograms (22,086 lb), including the adapters. The launch placed both satellites into geosynchronous transfer orbits with perigee altitudes of about 250 kilometres (160 mi) and apogee altitudes of approximately 35,786 kilometres (22,236 mi) at inclinations of about 3°. Hellas Sat 4 was in the upper position, inside the SYLDA adapter. The telecommunication satellite had a liftoff mass of approximately 6,495 kilograms (14,319 lb) and was developed by Lockheed Martin Space in its facilities in Denver, Colorado and Sunnyvale, California for KACST and Hellas Sat. It was designed to operate for 15 to 23 years from the 39° East orbital position, providing telecommunications services to Europe, South Africa, and the Middle East with its Ku- and Ka-band payloads. It is Lockheed Martin's 46th spacecraft orbited by Arianespace. GSAT-31 was in the lower position. The telecommunication satellite had a liftoff mass of 2,536 kilograms (5,591 lb). It was designed and manufactured by ISRO to operate for more than 15 years from the 48° East orbital position, providing telecommunications services with Ku-band coverage. It is ISRO's 22nd spacecraft orbited by Arianespace.							
VA-248	20 June 2019; 21:43	Ariane 5 ECA; 5107	Guiana; ELA-3	AT&T T-16; Eutelsat 7C	10,594 kg	GTO	AT&T; Eutelsat	Success
VA-248	American telecommunications company AT&T and European satellite operator Eutelsat were the customers for Ariane flight VA248. The flight launched two geostationary satellites. AT&T commissioned the launch of its AT&T T-16 communications satellite, originally ordered by satellite television provider DirecTV as the next satellite in its existing fleet prior to the acquisition of the company in 2015. (Note: The acquisition made AT&T the largest provider of subscription television in the world, with 26 million subscribers in 2015; this has since decreased to 22.4 million subscribers in 2019.) Eutelsat commissioned the launch of its Eutelsat 7C communications satellite, which provides 49 K_{u} band transponders for Sub-Saharan African digital television stations and capacity for several hundred channels in the region. The satellite also has optical communication capabilities for use by government services in Europe, the Middle East, and Central Asia, with a steerable beam capable of reaching areas visible to the satellite in its geostationary orbit above Africa. Eutelsat 7C was manufactured by Maxar Technologies and its design, intended for a lifespan of 15 years, is based on the SSL 1300 satellite bus. Weighing 3,400 kilograms (7,500 pounds), the satellite uses electric propulsion for orbit maintenance, which reduces the satellite's launch mass. Eutelsat 7C arrived at the Guiana Space Center on 31 May. AT&T T-16 and Eutelsat 7C were the 601st and 602nd satellites launched by Arianespace. The rocket's boosters and EPC first stage were expended in under nine minutes, while the ESC-A upper stage's HM7B engines burned for 16 minutes; the EPC first stage intentionally crashed in the Gulf of Guinea, off the west coast of Africa. Following the conclusion of the burn, AT&T T-16 separated from the ESC-A at 22:11 UTC, 28 minutes after the start of the flight, followed by the Eutelsat 7C's separation six minutes later, at 22:17 UTC. The flight lasted 34 minutes, and placed the satellites into a geostationary transfer orbit from which they will eventually be placed into geostationary orbit through their own propulsion. Eutelsat 7C was placed at 7° east, a position which allowed the satellite to serve its intended markets in Africa, Central Asia, Europe, and the Middle East. Eutelsat 7C continued in-orbit testing until the end of 2019, after which it became fully operational. Ariane flight VA248 was the 104th launch of an Ariane 5 launch vehicle, and the 71st launch of its ECA variant. It was also the fifth launch conducted by Arianespace in 2019.							
VA-249	6 August 2019; 19:30	Ariane 5 ECA+ 5108	Guiana; ELA-3	Intelsat 39; EDRS-C / HYLAS-3	9,786 kg	GTO	Intelsat; ESA / Airbus DS / Avanti	Success
VA-249	First flight of ECA+ variant.							
VA-250	26 November 2019; 21:23	Ariane 5 ECA; 5109	Guiana; ELA-3	Inmarsat-5 F5 (GX5); TIBA-1	9,607 kg	GTO	Inmarsat; Government of Egypt	Success
VA-250	Final flight of ECA variant.							

== Bibliography ==
- Wade, Mark. "Ariane". Encyclopedia Astronautica. Archived from the original on 7 September 2008.
- Ecuer, Marie-Sophie; Darvasi, Christina; Whyte, Jessica; Darlington, Joanna (31 May 2019). "EUTELSAT 7C Arrives in Kourou ahead of 20 June Launch". EUTELSAT.
- Rabie, Passant (20 June 2019). "Ariane 5 Rocket Lofts 2 Satellites into Orbit in Gorgeous Sunset Launch". space.com.
