= High-throughput satellite =

Type of communications satellite

A high-throughput satellite (HTS) is a communications satellite which provides more throughput than a classic fixed service satellite (FSS). An HTS provides at least twice, though usually 20 times or more, throughput for the same amount of allocated orbital spectrum, thus significantly reducing cost-per-bit. ViaSat-1 and EchoStar XVII (also known as Jupiter-1) provide more than 100 Gbit/s of capacity, which is more than 100 times the capacity offered by a conventional FSS satellite. When it was launched in October 2011, ViaSat-1 had more capacity (140 Gbit/s) than all other commercial communications satellites over North America combined.

== Overview ==
The significant increase in capacity is achieved by a high level frequency re-use and spot beam technology which enables frequency re-use across multiple narrowly focused spot beams (usually in the order of hundreds of kilometers), as in cellular networks, which both are defining technical features of high-throughput satellites. By contrast traditional satellite technology utilizes a broad single beam (usually in the order of thousands of kilometers) to cover wide regions or even entire continents. In addition to a large amount of bandwidth capacity HTS are defined by the fact that they often, but not solely, target the consumer market. In the last 10 years, the majority of high-throughput satellites operated in the K_{a} band (26.5–40 GHz), however this is not a defining criterion, and at the beginning of 2017 there were at least 10 K_{u} band (12–16 GHz) HTS satellite projects, of which 3 had launched and 7 were in construction.

Initially, HTS systems used satellites in the same geosynchronous orbit (at an altitude of 35,786 km) as satellite TV craft (with satellites such as KA-SAT, Yahsat 1A and Astra 2E sharing TV and HTS functionality) but the round-trip delay for internet protocol transmission via a geosynchronous satellite can exceed 550 ms which is detrimental to many digital connectivity applications, such as automated stock trades, on-line gaming and Skype video chats. The focus for HTS is increasingly shifting to the lower Medium Earth orbit (MEO) and Low Earth orbit (LEO), with altitudes as low as 600 km and delays as short as 40ms. Also, the lower path losses of MEO and LEO orbits reduces ground station and satellite power requirements and costs, and so vastly increased throughput and global coverage is achieved by using constellations of many smaller, cheaper high-throughput satellites. SES's O3b constellation was the first MEO high-throughput satellite system, launched in 2013, and by 2018 more than 18,000 new LEO satellites had been proposed to launch by 2025.

Despite the higher costs associated with spot beam technology, the overall cost per circuit is considerably lower as compared to shaped beam technology. While K_{u} band FSS bandwidth can cost well over $100 million per gigabit per second in space, HTS like ViaSat-1 can supply a gigabit of throughput in space for less than $3 million. While a reduced cost per bit is often cited as a substantial advantage of high-throughput satellites, the lowest cost per bit is not always the main driver behind the design of an HTS system, depending on the industry it will be serving.

HTS are primarily deployed to provide broadband Internet access service (point-to-point) to regions unserved or underserved by terrestrial technologies where they can deliver services comparable to terrestrial services in terms of pricing and bandwidth. While many current HTS platforms were designed to serve the consumer broadband market, some are also offering services to government and enterprise markets, as well as to terrestrial cellular network operators who face growing demand for broadband backhaul to rural cell sites. For cellular backhaul, the reduced cost per bit of many HTS platforms creates a significantly more favorable economic model for wireless operators to use satellite for cellular voice and data backhaul. Some HTS platforms are designed primarily for the enterprise, telecom or maritime sectors. HTS can furthermore support point-to-multipoint applications and even broadcast services such as DTH distribution to relatively small geographic areas served by a single spot beam.

A fundamental difference between HTS satellites is the fact that certain HTS are linked to ground infrastructure through a feeder link using a regional spot beam dictating the location of possible teleports while other HTS satellites allow the use of any spot beam for the location of the teleports. In the latter case, the teleports can be set up in a wider area as their spotbeams' footprints cover entire continents and regions like it is the case for traditional satellites .

Industry analysts at Northern Sky Research believe that high-throughput satellites will supply at least 1.34 TB/s of capacity by 2020 and thus will be a driving power for the global satellite backhaul market which is expected to triple in value – jumping from the 2012 annual revenue of about US$800 million to $2.3 billion by 2021.

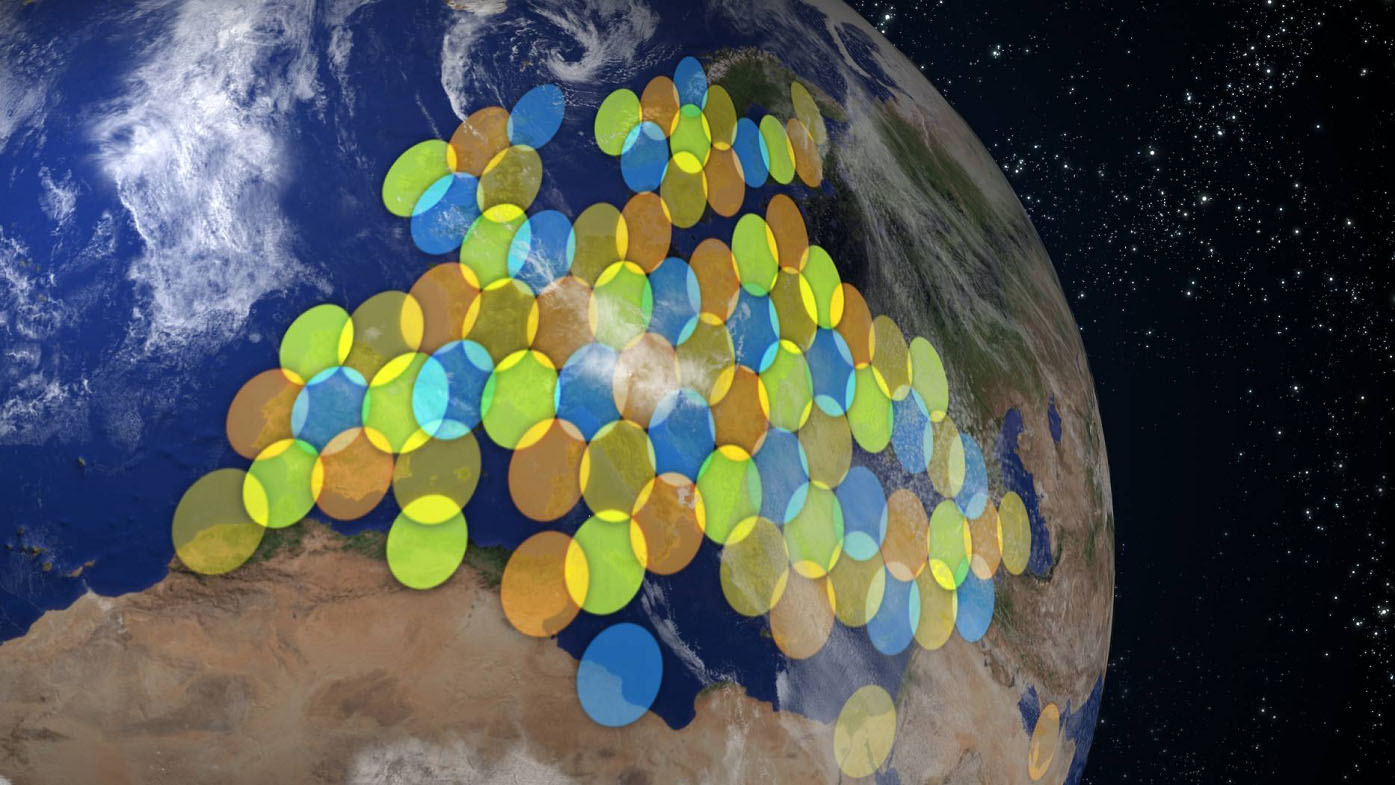
KA-SAT coverage over Europe showing frequency reuse by different colors

== List of high-throughput satellites ==
- Anik F2 (July 2004)
- Thaicom 4 (IPSTAR) (August 2005)
- Spaceway-3 (August 2007)
- WINDS (February 2008)
- KA-SAT (December 2010)
- Yahsat 1A (April 2011)
- ViaSat-1 (October 2011)
- Yahsat 1B (April 2012)
- EchoStar XVII (July 2012)
- HYLAS 2 (July 2012)
- Astra 2E (September 2013)
- O3b satellite constellation (2013-2014)
- Inmarsat Global Xpress constellation (2013-2015)
- Sky Muster 1 (NBN Co-1A) (30 September 2015)
- Badr-7 for TRIO Connect (November 2015)
- Intelsat 29e (2016)
- Intelsat 33e (2016)
- Sky Muster 2 (NBN Co-1B) (5 October 2016)
- SGDC (4 May 2017)
- SES-15 (May 2017)
- ViaSat-2 (June 2017)
- Intelsat 32e (2017)
- Intelsat 37e (2017)
- Intelsat 35e (2017)
- Eutelsat 172B (2017)
- GSAT-19 (2017)
- Shijian 13 (12 April 2017)
- SES-14 (January 2018)
- Yahsat-3 (25 January 2018)
- SES-12 (June 2018)
- GSAT-29 (14 November 2018)
- GSAT-11 (5 December 2018)
- Paksat-MM1 (30 May 2024)
- Nusantara Satu (22 February 2019)
- Kacific-1 (17 December 2019)
- Eutelsat Konnect (16 January 2020)
- SES-17 (24 October 2021)
- Eutelsat Konnect VHTS (07 September 2022)
- O3b mPOWER satellite constellation (16 December 2022)
- ChinaSat 26 (23 February 2023)

== See also ==
- Fixed-satellite service
