= Hylas (disambiguation) =

Hylas is a Greek mythological figure.

Hylas may also refer to:

- One of the two protagonists from Three Dialogues Between Hylas and Philonous and from Dialogs by Stanislaw Lem
- HYLAS, a series of British communications satellites
  - HYLAS-1
  - HYLAS-2
  - HYLAS-3
  - HYLAS-4
- Hylas Yachts, a Taiwanese yachts manufacturer

== See also ==
- Halas (disambiguation)
- Hyas (disambiguation)
- Hyles (disambiguation)
