= SaudiGeoSat-1/HellasSat-4 =

Geosynchronous communications satellite

SaudiGeoSat 1/HellasSat 4
- Names: HellasSat 4, SaudiGeoSat 1, SaudiGeostationarySatellite 1, SGS-1/HS-4
- Mission type: Telecommunications
- Operator: KACST, Hellas Sat
- COSPAR ID: 2019-007A
- SATCAT no.: 44034
- Mission duration: 15 years (planned)

Spacecraft properties
- Bus: A2100
- Manufacturer: Lockheed Martin
- Launch mass: 6495 kg

Start of mission
- Launch date: 5 February 2019
- Rocket: Ariane flight VA247
- Launch site: Centre Spatial Guyanais, ELA-3
- Contractor: Arianespace

Orbital parameters
- Reference system: Geocentric orbit
- Regime: Geosynchronous orbit
- Longitude: 39.0° East

SaudiGeoSat 1/HellasSat 4, also known as SaudiGeoSat 1/HellasSat 4 (abbreviated SGS-1/HS-4), is a Saudi and Greek geostationary communication satellite of King Abdulaziz City for Science and Technology (KACST) and HellasSat. It was built by Lockheed Martin and was launched on 5 February 2019 on board Ariane flight VA247.

The satellite will provide Telecommunications capabilities, including television, Internet, telephone and secure communications in the Middle East, South Africa and Europe. It is the 16th Saudi satellite launched into space and the 4th Greek and Cypriot satellite.

== Manufacturing ==
SGS-1 satellite was developed, manufactured and tested by Lockheed Martin in collaboration with KACST where 11 Saudi engineers were trained and certified by Lockheed Martin.

== Launch and Specification ==
SGS-1/HS-4 was launched on an Ariane 5 operated by Arianespace from the Centre Spatial Guyanais in French Guiana on Ariane flight VA247.

The satellite weighted 6,495 kg (14,319 lb) fully fuelled for launch, and it was placed into a geostationary transfer orbit (GTO). It will maintain a geosynchronous orbit at 39.0° East longitude.
