= VA244 =

VA244 may refer to:

- Ariane flight VA244, an Ariane 5 launch that occurred on 25 July 2018
- Virgin Australia flight 244, with IATA flight number VA244
- Virginia State Route 244 (VA-244), a primary state highway in the United States
