= VA249 =

VA249 may refer to:

- Ariane flight VA249, an Ariane 5 launch that occurred on 6 August 2019
- Virgin Australia flight 249, with IATA flight number VA249
- Virginia State Route 249 (SR 249 or VA-249), a primary state highway in the United States
