= VA248 =

VA248 may refer to:

- Ariane flight VA248, an Ariane 5 launch that occurred on 20 June 2019
- Virgin Australia flight 248, with IATA flight number VA248
- Virginia State Route 248 (VA-248), a primary state highway in the United States
