= Hyla (name) =

Hyla is a given name and surname. Notable people with the name Hyla include:

- Hyla Bristow Stallard (1901–1973, known as H. B. Stallard), English runner and ophthalmologist
- Hyla Willis, American artist
- Adolf Hyła (1897–1965), Polish artist

== See also ==
- Hyla, a genus of tree frogs
- Hylas (disambiguation)
