= AMC-23 =

American communications satellite

- Names: GE-2i; Worldsat-3; AMC-13; GE-23; Eutelsat-172A; Eutelsat-174A
- Mission type: Communications
- Operator: SES Americom (2005-2009); SES World Skies (2009-2011); SES S.A. (2011-2012); Eutelsat (2012-present)
- COSPAR ID: 2005-052A
- SATCAT no.: 28924
- Mission duration: 16 years (planned); 19 years, 2 months, 8 days (elapsed)

Spacecraft properties
- Spacecraft: GE-23
- Spacecraft type: Spacebus 4000
- Bus: Spacebus 4000C3
- Manufacturer: Alcatel Space
- Launch mass: 4,981 kg (10,981 lb)

Start of mission
- Launch date: 29 December 2005, 02:28:40 UTC
- Rocket: Proton-M / Briz-M
- Launch site: Baikonur Cosmodrome, Site 81/24
- Contractor: Khrunichev State Research and Production Space Center
- Entered service: Mars 2006

Orbital parameters
- Reference system: Geocentric orbit
- Regime: Geostationary orbit
- Longitude: 186° West

Transponders
- Band: 38 (+10) transponders: 18 (+4) C-band; 20 (+6) Ku-band
- Coverage area: Asia-Pacific, West Coast of the United States

AMC-23 (formerly GE-23) is an American geostationary communications satellite that was launched by a Proton-M / Briz-M launch vehicle at 02:28:40 UTC on 29 December 2005. The 4,981 kg (10,981 lb) satellite to provide services to the Asia-Pacific, West Coast of the United States through separate beams to each region, after parking over the Pacific Ocean through its 18 (+4) C-band and 20 (+6) Ku-band transponders, over 186° West longitude.

== GE-2i/AMC-13/Worldsat-3/AMC-23 ==
AMC-13 was originally ordered as GE-2i. In early 2004, AMC-13 was transferred to Worldsat LLC, a new subsidiary of SES Americom as Worldsat 3. The original AMC-13 was to feature 60 C-Band transponders, but when transferred to Worldsat, it was ordered to be changed to the hybrid C-/Ku-band payload with 18 C-band and 20 Ku-band transponders. In early 2005, it was renamed AMC-23.

== GE-23 ==
In 2007, the satellite was spun-off from SES Americom to GE-Satellite, when General Electric split off from SES. After this transaction, the satellite was renamed GE-23.

== Eutelsat-172A ==
Eutelsat has announced in June 2012 the acquisition of GE-23 satellite from GE-Satellite. The satellite is renamed to Eutelsat 172A and expands Eutelsat coverage to Asia-Pacific region and West Coast of United States of America. The satellite had at that time an estimated lifespan of 8.5 years.

== Eutelsat-174A ==
In 2017, after Eutelsat 172B had replaced it, Eutelsat 172A was moved to 174° East and renamed Eutelsat 174A.
