= Kathleen Kramer =

President and CEO of IEEE, and American academic

- Born: Kathleen A. Kramer; California, America
- Education: California Institute of Technology
- Occupations: Academic, administrator, researcher, writer
- Organization: 2025 president of IEEE

Kathleen Kramer is an American academic. She is the president and CEO of Institute of Electrical and Electronics Engineers (IEEE) and electrical engineering professor at the University of San Diego.

== Education ==
Kramer received the B.S. degree in electrical engineering magna cum laude with a second major in physics from Loyola Marymount University, and M.S. and Ph.D. degrees in electrical engineering from the California Institute of Technology.

== Career ==
As of 2025, Kramer is the president and CEO of Institute of Electrical and Electronics Engineers (IEEE). She is Chair of Electrical Engineering at the University of San Diego, also serving as Director of Engineering from 2004 to 2013. Prior to becoming president and CEO of IEEE, Kramer served as vice president and distinguished lecturer of the IEEE Aerospace and Electronics Systems Society, IEEE secretary, and director of IEEE Region 6. She also chaired IEEE's committee on innovative funding models.

Kramer has worked previously at ViaSat, Hewlett Packard, and Bell Communications Research.

Kramer is a Fellow of the Accreditation Board for Engineering and Technology.

== Awards ==
- 2025 Engineering Honor Awards
