= SES-17 =

Geostationary communications satellite

- Mission type: Communications
- Operator: SES
- COSPAR ID: 2021-095A
- SATCAT no.: 49332
- Website: https://www.ses.com/
- Mission duration: 15 years (planned); 4 years, 11 months, 10 days (in progress)

Spacecraft properties
- Spacecraft: SES-17
- Spacecraft type: Spacebus
- Bus: SpaceBusNEO 200
- Manufacturer: Thales Alenia Space
- Launch mass: 6,411 kg (14,134 lb)
- Dry mass: 5,060 kg (11,160 lb)
- Power: 15 kW

Start of mission
- Launch date: 24 October 2021, 02:10 UTC
- Rocket: Ariane 5ECA (VA255)
- Launch site: Centre Spatial Guyanais, Kourou, ELA-3
- Contractor: Arianespace

Orbital parameters
- Reference system: Geocentric orbit
- Regime: Geostationary orbit
- Longitude: 67.1° West

Transponders
- Band: ~200 Ka-band spot beams
- Coverage area: North America, South America, Caribbean, Atlantic Ocean

SES-17, is a high throughput all electric geostationary communications satellite owned and operated by SES, and designed and manufactured by Thales Alenia Space. Launched on 24 October 2021 from Centre Spatial Guyanais (CSG), in Kourou, French Guiana by an Ariane 5ECA launch vehicle, SES-17 was positioned at 67.1° west in May 2022 and, after testing, became fully operational in June 2022.

The satellite operates in conjunction with SES's other geostationary satellites and SES's medium Earth orbit O3b and O3b mPOWER satellites to provide connectivity services across North America, South America, the Caribbean and the Atlantic Ocean.

== Satellite description ==
SES-17 is based on the three axis stabilised SpaceBusNEO 200 satellite bus. It has a mass of 6,411 kg (14,134 lb), produces 15 kW of power and has a design life of 15 years. Like all SpaceBusNEO, SES-17 uses electric propulsion exclusively for both orbit raising and station keeping and was launched on an Arianespace Ariane 5ECA launch vehicle on 24 October 2021.

The satellite will provide almost 200 Ka-band spot beams of mixed sizes for coverage over North America, South America, Caribbean, and the Atlantic Ocean mainly for aircraft connectivity.

SES-17 is SES's first geostationary Ka-band high-throughput satellite, and the first one to include a fully digital payload, using Thales' Spaceflex VHTS Processor, a Digital Transparent Processor (DTP) developed with support from the French space agency, Centre National d'Études Spatiales CNES and the European Space Agency (ESA) to provide in-orbit frequency plan flexibility so mobility customers can change their networks in real time in response to changing bandwidth demands, implementing broadcast, multicast or mesh network as required, and improving efficiency in throughput and bandwidth use.

Along with SES's medium Earth orbit satellite constellation, O3b mPOWER, SES-17 is managed through the Adaptive Resource Control (ARC) software system developed jointly between SES and Kythera Space Solutions, autonomously optimizing space and ground resources, on-the-fly, in accordance with customers' changing needs.

== History ==
On 12 September 2016, SES ordered the SES-17 dedicated Ka-band high-throughput satellite from Thales Alenia Space of France and Italy, the main contractor for SES's O3b satellites. Offering mobility connectivity services over the Americas and the Atlantic Ocean, SES-17 was expected to launch in 2020 with the FlytLIVE airline passenger connectivity service from Thales Avionics as its anchor customer. Prior to the launch of SES-17, FlytLIVE would use capacity contracted by SES on Hughes's EchoStar XVII and EchoStar XIX satellites, along with SES's own AMC-15 and AMC-16 satellites. The cost of the satellite and launch, and the network of gateways on the ground is expected to be around US$500 million.

In September 2017, SES announced that Arianespace had been selected to launch SES-17 in 2021.

In September 2019, SES announced it had partnered with satellite payload and network management systems developer, Kythera Space Solutions to develop the ARC (Adaptive Resource Control) software to enable the dynamic control and optimisation of power, throughput, beams and frequency allocation on SES-17 and other future high-throughput satellites and their networks.

SES's 2020 Annual Report, released in March 2021, said that SES-17 was expected to launch in July 2021. In April 2021, Arianespace projected a launch in August 2021, then, in September 2021 a launch on 22 October 2021. After a small delay caused by technical issues with the launch pad, the launch was successfully carried out on 24 October 2021 at 02:10 UTC.

In May 2022, SES-17 reached its intended orbital position at 67.1° west and, after testing, became fully operational in June 2022.

In July-August 2022, Spirit Airline's inflight Internet service (using Thales' FlytLIVE) transitioned from Hughes Network Systems satellites to SES-17 to become "the fastest Wi-Fi service of any US-based airline" with connection speeds of up to 400 Mbps for A320 and A321 passengers across all Spirit routes.

In August 2023, SES announced that the combined contract backlog for SES-17, along with the O3b mPOWER high-throughput MEO satellite constellation (expected to begin commercial service by the end of 2023) is now in excess of US$1 billion (gross $1,025 million, fully protected $835 million).

== See also ==
- SES - the owner and operator of SES-17
- List of SES satellites - list of all SES satellites
- O3b - connectivity satellite constellation owned by SES
- O3b mPOWER - next generation connectivity satellite constellation owned by SES
