= VA246 =

VA246 may refer to:

- Ariane flight VA246, an Ariane 5 launch that occurred on 4 December 2018
- Virgin Australia flight 246, with IATA flight number VA246
- Virginia State Route 246 (VA-246), a primary state highway in the United States
