= VA241 =

VA241 may refer to:

- Ariane flight VA241, an Ariane 5 launch that occurred on 25 January 2018
- Virgin Australia flight 241, with IATA flight number VA241
- Virginia State Route 241 (VA-241), a primary state highway in the United States
