= David Williams (businessman, born 1969) =

Welsh businessman (born 1969)

David John Williams (born May 1969 in Wales) is the founder of quantum encryption company Arqit Limited.

After initially going to market with a satellite hardware solution , Arqit announced in December 2023 that it had invented software, called Symmetric Key Agreement, which can provide quantum safe encryption with cloud delivered software, removing all need for hardware. This was validated by a number of commercial agreements with companies like Fortinet {https://www.fortinet.com/content/dam/fortinet/assets/alliances/sb-fortinet-and-arqit-vpn-integration.pdf }, Juniper , Detasad and the World's fourth largest Tier 1 telco TI Sparkle . Intel published a White Paper affirming Arqit claims for the performance of its software, and it was announced that through signature of an ISV contract, Arqit became the quantum safe encryption partner of Intel, with the software integrated onto XEON processor based devices for global sale by Intel .

David graduated with a BA in Economics and Politics from the University of Leeds.

Williams was co-founder of Avanti Communications Group plc, the United Kingdom's first start-up operator, listed on the London Stock Exchange. Avanti was the first company to operate a High Throughput Satellite in EMEA and notably won the contract to build the backhaul system for the British Government's homeland security "Emergency Services Network". The company delisted from the London Stock Exchange in 2019 with a share price of 0.25p. In November 2014, the shares were trading at 320p a share.

Williams was chairman of the advisory board of Seraphim Space Ventures, whose creation he initiated in partnership with the UK Space Agency.

Williams also founded in 1999 a start up venture capital company called Active Media Capital Ltd which wound up in 2006 returning 768% of investors capital. He was awarded the Entrepreneur of the Year Award at the Quoted Company Awards 2006.

He was awarded a Queen's Award for Export in 2015.
