= Koreasat 7 =

South Korean satellite launched in 2017

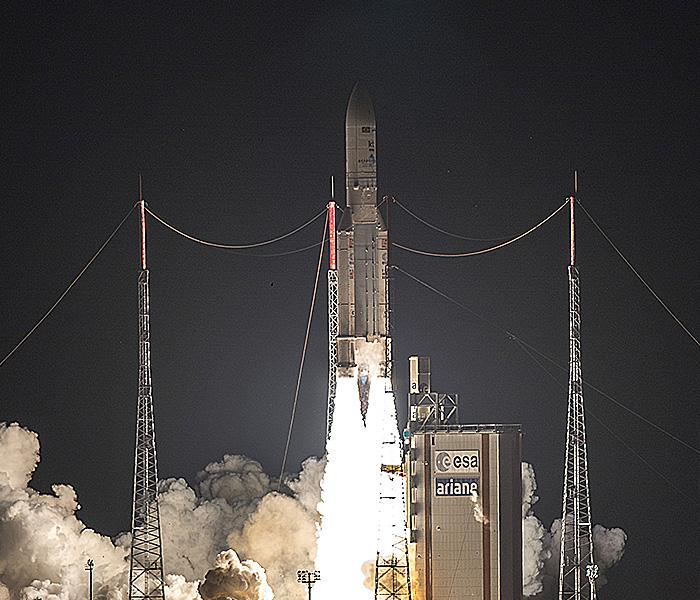
- Launch of Ariane 5 ECA flight VA236 with Koreasat 7 and SGDC-1
- Mission type: Communications Satellite
- Operator: KT Sat
- COSPAR ID: 2017-023A
- SATCAT no.: 42691

Spacecraft properties
- Bus: Spacebus-4000B2
- Manufacturer: Thales Alenia Space

Start of mission
- Launch date: 00:00, April 5, 2017 (UTC) UTC
- Rocket: Ariane 5 ECA (VA236)
- Launch site: Guiana Space Centre ELA-3
- Contractor: Arianespace

Orbital parameters
- Reference system: Geocentric
- Regime: Geosynchronous
- Longitude: 116° E

Transponders
- Band: Ku, Ka
- Coverage area: Korea, Philippines, Indonesia, India

Koreasat 7 (also known as Mugunghwa 7) is a South Korean communications satellite operated by KT SAT, a subsidiary of KT Corporation. Thales Alenia Space was contracted in 2014 to build both it and Koreasat 5A. Koreasat 7A was launched into geosynchronous orbit on 4 May 2017 aboard an Ariane 5 ECA launch vehicle and placed at 116 degrees east longitude to provide coverage over East Asia.
