= Avanti Communications =

Avanti Communications Group plc
- Company type: Private limited company
- Traded as: formerly LSE: AVN
- Headquarters: London, United Kingdom
- Area served: EMEA
- Key people: Kyle Whitehill, Chief Executive Officer
- Website: avanti.space

Avanti Communications is a UK based satellite operator, selling wholesale satellite broadband and satellite connectivity services to Internet Service Providers, Mobile Network Operators, Enterprises, Governments and other satellite operators. The Avanti HYLAS fleet of satellites provides coverage of the Americas, Europe, the Middle East and Africa.

The company was listed on London's Alternative Investment Market (AIM) as LSE: AVN and employs approximately 200 staff across the UK, Europe, US, the Middle East and Africa. Its headquarters are in London (UK) with offices in Goonhilly (UK), Limassol (Cyprus), Istanbul (Turkey) Nairobi (Kenya), Dar es Salaam (Tanzania), Johannesburg (South Africa) and Lagos (Nigeria).

Kyle Whitehill joined as CEO in April 2018, with the long-standing CEO and co-founder, David Williams, stepping down in August 2017.

Avanti currently has 4 Geostationary orbit (GEO) High-throughput satellite (HTS), HYLAS-1, HYLAS-2 and HYLAS-4 in orbit. Its latest HTS, HYLAS 3, launched in July 2019 as a payload on board Airbus/European Space Agency's EDRS-C satellite. Avanti has dual geo-redundant Gateway Earth Stations (GES) across Europe the Middle East and Africa to provide high levels of network resiliency and resulting in a claimed 99.9% uptime service level. The company has GES in the UK, Cyprus, Germany, Turkey, South Africa and Nigeria.

In September 2019, Avanti announced it will delist from London Stock Exchange. The trading with Avanti's stock ended 17 September 2019. At the time, Avanti had 3 geostationary communications satellites (HYLAS-1, HYLAS-2, HYLAS-4), a hosted payload on Airbus’ and the European Space Agency's EDRS-C satellite (HYLAS-3), and a leased payload on SES's Astra 5B satellite.
