= Hyles =

Hyles may refer to:

- Hyles-Anderson College
- Jack Hyles (1926–2001), American Baptist minister
- Hyles (moth), a genus of hawkmoths in the family Sphingidae

== See also ==
- Hyle, a philosophical term for matter or stuff
- Hylas (disambiguation)
