= Global-scale Observations of the Limb and Disk =

NASA heliophysics satellite launched in 2018

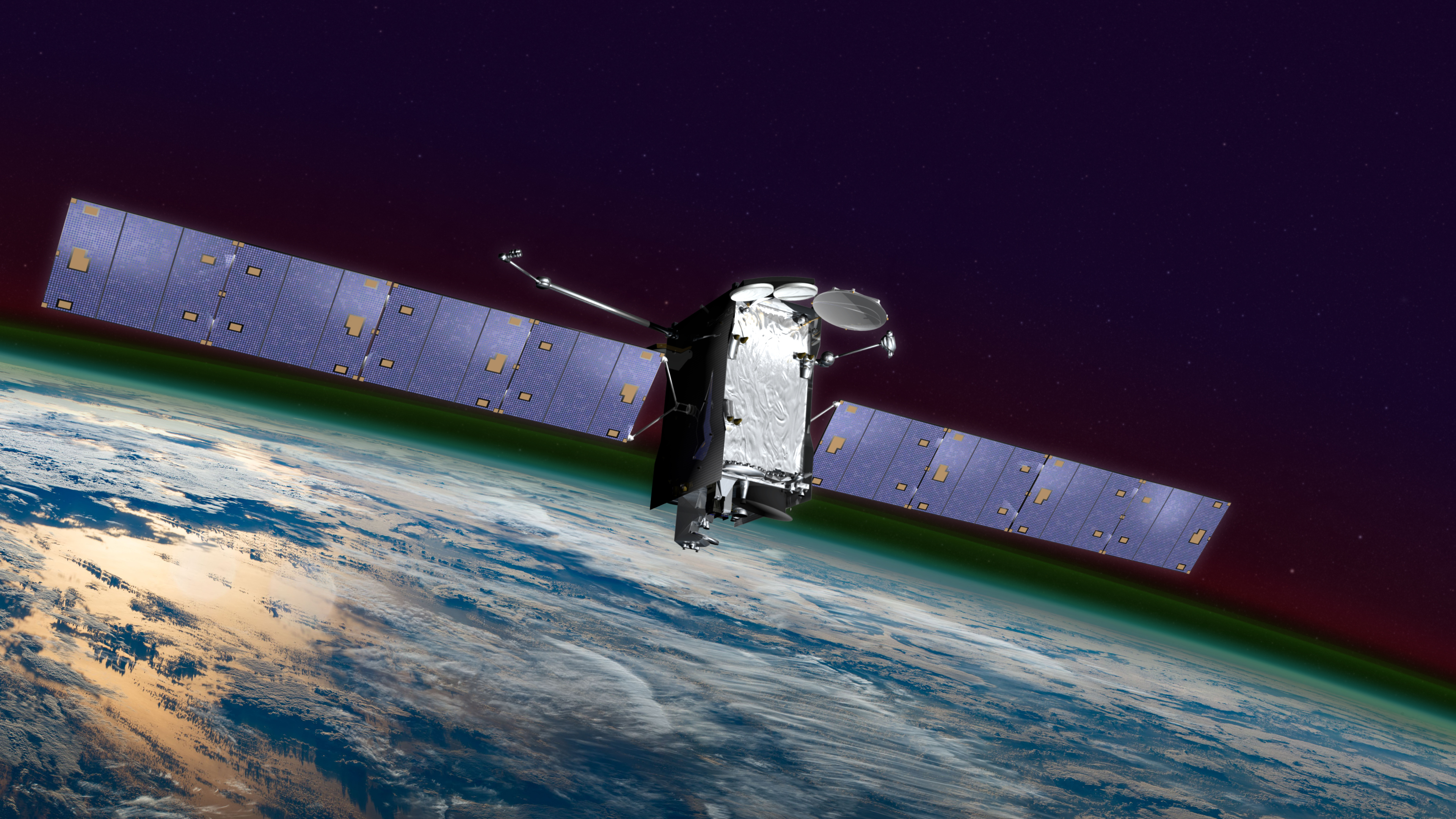
- SES-14 with GOLD (bottom left of satellite)
- Names: GOLD
- Mission type: Observation of Earth's thermosphere and ionosphere
- Operator: Laboratory for Atmospheric and Space Physics
- COSPAR ID: 2018-012B
- SATCAT no.: 43175
- Website: gold.cs.ucf.edu
- Mission duration: 2 years (planned)

Spacecraft properties
- Spacecraft type: Explorer
- Manufacturer: Laboratory for Atmospheric and Space Physics
- Launch mass: 36.8 kg (81 lb)
- Dimensions: 51 cm × 55 cm × 69 cm (20 in × 22 in × 27 in)
- Power: 72.4 watts

Start of mission
- Launch date: 25 January 2018, 22:20 UTC
- Rocket: Ariane 5 ECA, VA241
- Launch site: Centre Spatial Guyanais, Kourou, ELA-3
- Contractor: Arianespace
- Entered service: October 2018

Orbital parameters
- Reference system: Geocentric orbit (planned)
- Regime: Geostationary orbit

Main Imaging spectrograph
- Wavelengths: Far ultraviolet

Transponders
- Bandwidth: 6 Mbps

Global-scale Observations of the Limb and Disk (GOLD) is a heliophysics Mission of Opportunity (MOU) for NASA's Explorers program. Led by Richard Eastes at the Laboratory for Atmospheric and Space Physics, which is located at the University of Colorado Boulder, GOLD's mission is to image the boundary between Earth and space in order to answer questions about the effects of solar and atmospheric variability of Earth's space weather. GOLD was one of 11 proposals selected, of the 42 submitted, for further study in September 2011. On 12 April 2013, NASA announced that GOLD, along with the Ionospheric Connection Explorer (ICON), had been selected for flight in 2017. GOLD, along with its commercial host satellite SES-14, launched on 25 January 2018.

== Mission concept and history ==
GOLD is intended to perform a two-year mission imaging Earth's thermosphere and ionosphere from geostationary orbit. GOLD is a two-channel far-ultraviolet (FUV) imaging spectrograph built by the Laboratory for Atmospheric and Space Physics at the University of Colorado Boulder and flown as a hosted payload on the commercial communications satellite SES-14. Additional organizations participating in the GOLD mission include the National Center for Atmospheric Research, Virginia Tech, the University of California, Berkeley, the University of Central Florida, Computational Physics Inc., the National Oceanic and Atmospheric Administration (NOAA), the U.S. Naval Research Laboratory (NRL), Boston University, and Clemson University.

In June 2017, SES announced the successful integration of GOLD with the SES-14 satellite under construction at Airbus Defence and Space in Toulouse, France. GOLD was launched on 25 January 2018 at 22:20 UTC aboard Ariane 5 ECA VA241 from the Centre spatial Guyanais.

== Scientific objectives ==
The scientific objectives of the GOLD mission are to determine how geomagnetic storms alter the temperature and composition of Earth's atmosphere, to analyze the global-scale response of the thermosphere to solar extreme-ultraviolet variability, to investigate the significance of atmospheric waves and tides propagating from below the temperature structure of the thermosphere and to resolve how the structure of the equatorial ionosphere influences the formation and evolution of equatorial plasma density irregularities. The viewpoint provided by GOLD's geostationary orbit – from which the same hemisphere is always observable – is a new perspective on the Earth's upper atmosphere. This viewpoint allows local time, universal time and longitudinal variations of the thermosphere and ionosphere's response to the various forcing mechanisms to be uniquely determined.

== Results ==
Data from GOLD has been used to confirm that variation in the equatorial ionization anomaly at night and in the early morning is governed by atmospheric waves in the lower atmosphere. GOLD observations have also implicated gravity waves emanating from the lower atmosphere in the seeding of equatorial plasma bubbles, which degrade GPS performance. GOLD daytime observations of the thermosphere column density ratio of atomic oxygen and nitrogen revealed new findings. First, GOLD observations showed that even weak or minor geomagnetic activity (maximum Kp=1.7) can still generate significant disturbances in the thermosphere and ionosphere. This is crucial for space weather forecasting because the pre-quiet condition before the disturbed time determines the accuracy of the forecast. Second, the neutral tongue, which is an enhancement of O/N2 surrounded by depletion of O/N2 and had only been seen in simulations, was first observed by GOLD. This modified the classic theory of thermospheric composition disturbance during storms. The theory predicted that the disturbance co-rotates from day to night but did not specify what else happens to the depletion.
