= Geostationary Satellite for Defense and Strategic Communications =

Brazilian geostationary communication satellite

SGDC
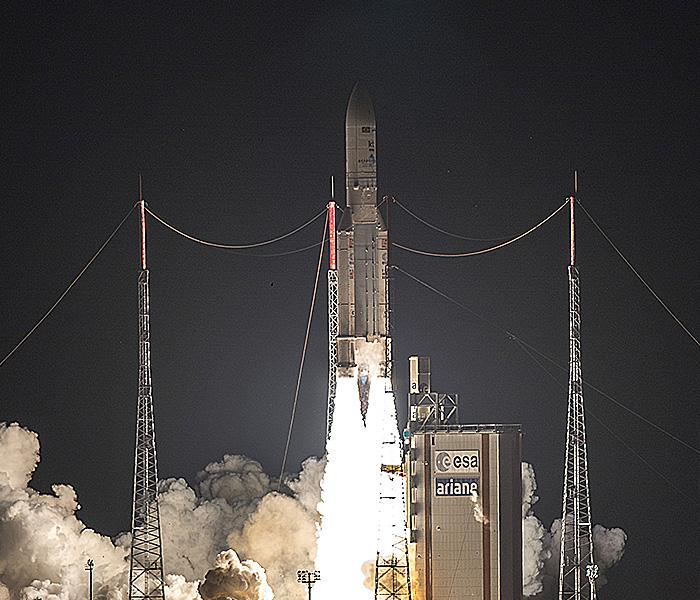
- Launch of Ariane 5 ECA flight VA236 with SGDC-1 and Koreasat 7
- Mission type: Earth orbiter
- Operator: Telebrás and Viasat
- COSPAR ID: 2017-023B
- SATCAT no.: 42692
- Website: Portal SGDC Telebras
- Mission duration: 18 years (planned)

Spacecraft properties
- Bus: 4000C4
- Manufacturer: Thales Alenia Space
- Launch mass: 5,735 kg (12,644 lb)
- Dimensions: 7.10 m × 2.20 m × 2.0 m (23.3 ft × 7.2 ft × 6.6 ft)
- Power: 11 kW

Start of mission
- Launch date: May 4, 2017, 21:52 UTC
- Rocket: Ariane 5 VA236
- Launch site: Kourou ELA-3
- Contractor: Arianespace

Orbital parameters
- Reference system: Geocentric
- Regime: Geostationary
- Longitude: 73.7° W
- Semi-major axis: 42,164.0 km (26,199.5 mi)
- Eccentricity: 0.00016
- Perigee altitude: 35,784.6 km (22,235.5 mi)
- Apogee altitude: 35,802.6 km (22,246.7 mi)
- Inclination: 0.0229°
- Period: 1,436.1 minutes
- RAAN: 66.4545°
- Argument of perigee: 43.2613°
- Mean anomaly: 250.3095°
- Mean motion: 1.00272241
- Epoch: July 8, 2018
- Revolution no.: 436

Transponders
- Band: 50 Ka band 7 IEEE X-band
- Coverage area: Brazil, South Atlantic Ocean

The Geostationary Satellite for Defense and Strategic Communications (Portuguese: Satélite Geoestacionário de Defesa e Comunicações Estratégicas, or SGDC) is a Brazilian geostationary communication satellite that was built by Thales Alenia Space in France, it was placed in the orbital position of 75 degrees west longitude and will be operated by Telebrás. Telebrás selected Viasat as a partner to help build the associated ground system. The satellite was based on the Spacebus-4000 platform and its life expectancy will be 18 years.

The satellite was successfully launched into space on May 4, 2017, at 21:52 UTC, by means of an Ariane 5 vehicle from the French company Arianespace, launched from Guiana Space Centre, Kourou, French Guiana, together with the Koreasat 7. It had a launch mass of 12,800 pounds (5,800 kg). The SGDC will be equipped with 50 Ka band transponders and 5 X band transponders to provide broadband internet and communications to the Brazilian government and the Brazilian Armed Forces.

A backup satellite, SGDC-2, was initially planned for launch no earlier than 2022. As of July 2021, the procurement of this satellite has been delayed indefinitely due to concerns over cost and the legality of the procurement agreement. The project has also drawn criticism for advancing a public narrative of national integration, even as governance challenges persist, transparency in public–private arrangements remains limited, and constraints on capacity and continuity may curtail the project’s scope and jeopardize the originally proposed constellation.

== See also ==
- China-Brazil Earth Resources Satellite
- Brazilian Space Agency
