= Burum =

Burum may refer to:

- Burum, Friesland, Netherlands
- Burum, Yemen
- Burum language, a Papuan language
- Stephen H. Burum (born 1939), American cinematographer
