= Hyas (disambiguation) =

Hyas is an archer in Greek mythology.

Hyas may also refer to:

- Hyas (crab), a genus of crabs
- Hyas, Saskatchewan, a village in Canada
- HYAS (company), a cybersecurity threat intelligence company
