= Orbit spectrum =

NASA's Earth-observing fleet as of June 2012.

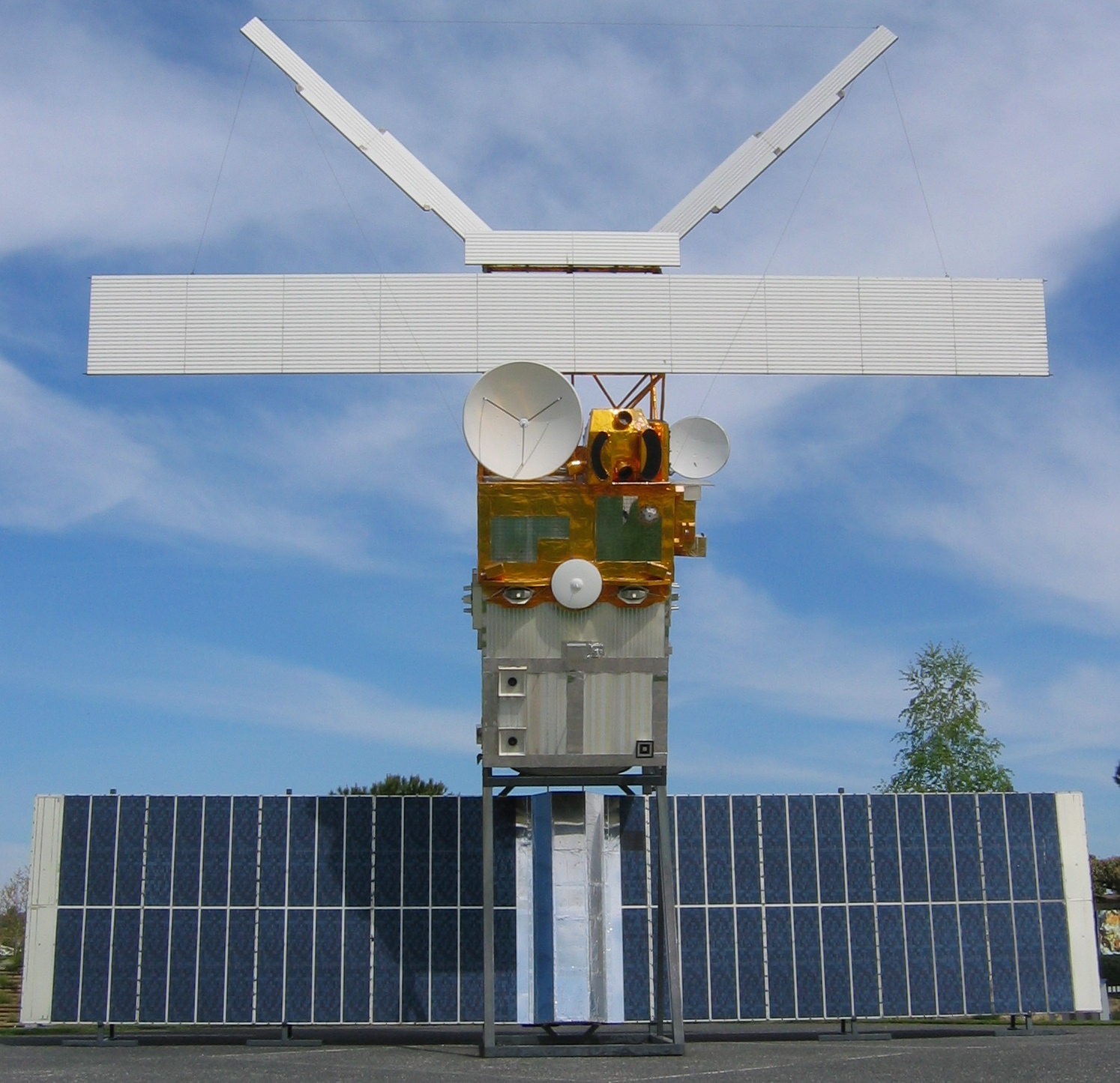
A full-size model of the Earth observation satellite ERS 2

Orbit spectrum, also known as satellite spectrum, is a segment of a radio spectrum that becomes available when satellites are placed into orbit. This spectrum is a limited resource for every country. To ensure optimum utilization of the orbit spectrum, the national administrations of countries worldwide undertake regular monitoring exercises. This orbit spectrum is used by service providers to implement satellite broadcasting, communication satellite, and weather satellite services. To ensure the quality of services, this orbit spectrum must be used by service providers according to the terms and conditions approved by the respective government. Regulatory measures must be enforced. This practice of regulating the spectrum within the limits of permissions or licenses is part of spectrum management.

== Missions ==
Orbit spectrum requires management which in turn needs effective spectrum monitoring exercises to enforce regulatory measures for ensuring the legal usage of spectrum resources. Many examples of such spectrum monitoring exercises were undertaken by different countries around the world.

== Regulation and Allocation ==
The International Telecommunication Union (ITU) plays a crucial role in regulating and allocating frequencies in the radio-frequency spectrum, including those used by satellites. Different frequency bands are designated for various satellite communication services.

== Frequency Bands ==
Satellite communication operates in various frequency bands, including C-band, Ku-band, Ka-band, and others. The choice of frequency bands depends on factors such as the type of service, satellite orbit, and atmospheric conditions.
