= HYLAS-4 =

Telecommunications satellite

- Operator: Avanti Communications
- COSPAR ID: 2018-033B
- SATCAT no.: 43272
- Mission duration: 15 years

Spacecraft properties
- Bus: Star-3 Bus
- Manufacturer: Orbital ATK
- Launch mass: 4,000 kg

Start of mission
- Launch date: 5 April 2018, 21:34 UTC
- Rocket: Ariane 5 flight VA242
- Launch site: ELA-3, Guiana Space Centre
- Contractor: Arianespace

Orbital parameters
- Eccentricity: circular
- Periapsis altitude: 35,786 km
- Apoapsis altitude: 35,786 km
- Period: 23h 56min

Transponders
- Band: Ka-band
- Capacity: up to 28 GHz

HYLAS-4 is a telecommunications satellite owned and operated by Avanti Communications and manufactured by Orbital ATK (now Northrop Grumman Innovation Systems) that was launched by an Ariane 5 rocket on 5 April 2018.

== Mission ==
The satellite is built to provide high speed data transmission services to Africa, Latin America and Europe. It is based on Orbital ATK's Star-3 Bus, delivering 64 28 GHz fixed beams covering Africa and parts of Europe. There are also four independent steerable beams that can serve Africa, South America and Europe. The capacity will partially be used to allow Avanti to expand into new markets and provide growth for existing markets.

== Launch ==
The satellite was launched into geosynchronous orbit by Arianespace on an Ariane 5 rocket in its ECA variant from ELA-3 at Guiana Space Centre in French Guiana. The launch was originally planned in early 2017 but has been delayed to 21 March 2018, and then to 5 April 2018. The satellite reached its geostationary orbital position by 19 April 2018.
