= EchoStar XVII =

Communications satellite

- Mission type: Communication
- Operator: EchoStar
- COSPAR ID: 2012-035A
- SATCAT no.: 38551
- Mission duration: Planned: 15 years Elapsed: 12 years, 8 months

Spacecraft properties
- Bus: LS-1300
- Manufacturer: Space Systems/Loral
- Launch mass: 6,100 kilograms (13,400 lb)

Start of mission
- Launch date: 5 July 2012, 21:36 UTC
- Rocket: Ariane 5ECA
- Launch site: Kourou ELA-3
- Contractor: Arianespace

Orbital parameters
- Reference system: Geocentric
- Regime: Geostationary
- Longitude: 107.1° West
- Perigee altitude: 35,781 kilometers (22,233 mi)
- Apogee altitude: 35,804 kilometers (22,248 mi)
- Inclination: 0.01 degrees
- Period: 1436.10 minutes
- Epoch: 25 January 2015, 05:22:59 UTC

Transponders
- Band: 60 K_{a} band (NATO K band)

EchoStar XVII or EchoStar 17, also known as Jupiter 1, is an American geostationary high throughput communications satellite which is operated by Hughes Network Systems, a subsidiary of EchoStar. It is positioned in geostationary orbit at a longitude of 107.1° West, from where it is used for satellite internet access over HughesNet.

EchoStar XVII was built by Space Systems/Loral, and is based on the LS-1300 satellite bus. It measures 8.0 metres (26.2 ft) by 3.2 metres (10 ft) by 3.1 metres (10 ft), with 26.07-meter (85.5 ft) solar arrays which were deployed after launch, and generates a minimum of 16.1 kilowatts of power. The spacecraft had a mass at liftoff of 6,100 kilograms (13,400 lb), and is expected to operate for fifteen years. It carries sixty K_{a} band (NATO K band) transponders which is used to cover North America.

EchoStar XVII was launched by Arianespace, using an Ariane 5ECA carrier rocket flying from ELA-3 at Kourou. The spacecraft was launched at 21:36 UTC on 5 July 2012. The MSG-3 weather satellite was launched aboard the same rocket, mounted below EchoStar XVII, which was atop a Sylda 5 adaptor. The launch successfully placed both satellites into a geosynchronous transfer orbit. EchoStar XVII used its own propulsion system to manoeuvre into a geostationary orbit.

== Path to geostationary orbit ==
Animation of EchoStar XVII's trajectory from 5 July 2012 to 19 July 2012 EchoStar XVII · Earth

Animation of EchoStar XVII's trajectory Equatorial view from 5 July 2012 to 19 July 2012

== See also ==
- ViaSat-1 – Similar high throughput satellite that was the source of a lawsuit to the manufacturer of both
- 2012 in spaceflight
