= Equatorial plasma bubble =

Ionospheric phenomenon that degrades GPS

Equatorial plasma bubbles are an ionospheric phenomenon near the Earth's geomagnetic equator at night time. They affect radio waves by causing varying delays. They degrade the performance of GPS.

Different times of the year and locations have different frequencies of occurrence. In Northern Australia, the most common times are February to April and August to October, when a plasma bubble is expected every night. Plasma bubbles have dimensions around 100 km. Plasma bubbles form after dark when the sun stops ionising the ionosphere. The ions recombine, forming a lower-density layer. This layer can rise through the more ionized layers above via convection, which makes a plasma bubble. The bubbles are turbulent with irregular edges.
