= ViaSat-1 =

High throughput communications satellite

- October 2, 2011. The Proton-M space rocket with the ViaSat-1 spacecraft is being rolled out to the launch complex of site 200 at the Baikonur Cosmodrome. The train is being pulled by a TEM2UM-4014 diesel locomotive. The rocket was launched at 22:48 Moscow time on October 19, 2011.
- Names: VS-1, VIASAT-IOM
- Mission type: Communication
- Operator: Viasat Inc. / Telesat
- COSPAR ID: 2011-059A
- SATCAT no.: 37843
- Mission duration: 15 years (planned); 14 years, 9 months, 23 days (elapsed)

Spacecraft properties
- Bus: LS-1300
- Manufacturer: Space Systems/Loral
- Launch mass: 6,740 kg (14,860 lb)
- Dry mass: 3,650 kg (8,050 lb)

Start of mission
- Launch date: 19 October 2011, 18:48:58 UTC
- Rocket: Proton-M/Briz-M
- Launch site: Baikonur 200/39
- Contractor: International Launch Services

Orbital parameters
- Reference system: Geocentric
- Regime: Geostationary
- Longitude: 115.1° west
- Perigee altitude: 35,783 kilometres (22,235 mi)
- Apogee altitude: 35,802 kilometres (22,246 mi)
- Inclination: 0.00 degrees
- Period: 1436.10 minutes
- Epoch: 25 January 2015, 04:39:48 UTC

Transponders
- Band: 56 Ka-band
- Coverage area: Contiguous United States, Alaska, Hawaii, Canada

ViaSat-1 is a high throughput communications satellite owned by Viasat Inc. and Telesat Canada. Launched October 19, 2011 aboard a Proton rocket, it held the Guinness record for the world's highest capacity communications satellite with a total capacity in excess of 140 Gbit/s, more than all the satellites covering North America combined, at the time of its launch.

== Overview ==
ViaSat-1 is capable of two-way communications with small dish antennas at higher speeds and a lower cost-per-bit than any satellite before.

The satellite is positioned at 115.1 degrees West longitude geostationary orbit point, with 72 Ka-band spot beams; 63 over the U.S. (Eastern and Western states, Alaska and Hawaii), and nine over Canada.

The Canadian beams are owned by satellite operator Telesat and are used for the Xplornet broadband service to consumers in rural Canada. The US beams provide fast Internet access called Exede, Viasat's satellite Internet service.

ViaSat-1 is a satellite system architecture created by Viasat Inc. The objective is to create a better satellite broadband user experience, making satellite competitive with DSL and wireless broadband alternatives for the first time.

== See also ==
- ViaSat-2
- Viasat
- High-throughput satellite – This type of communication satellite.
- Satellite Internet access
