= SES-14 =

Geostationary communications satellite

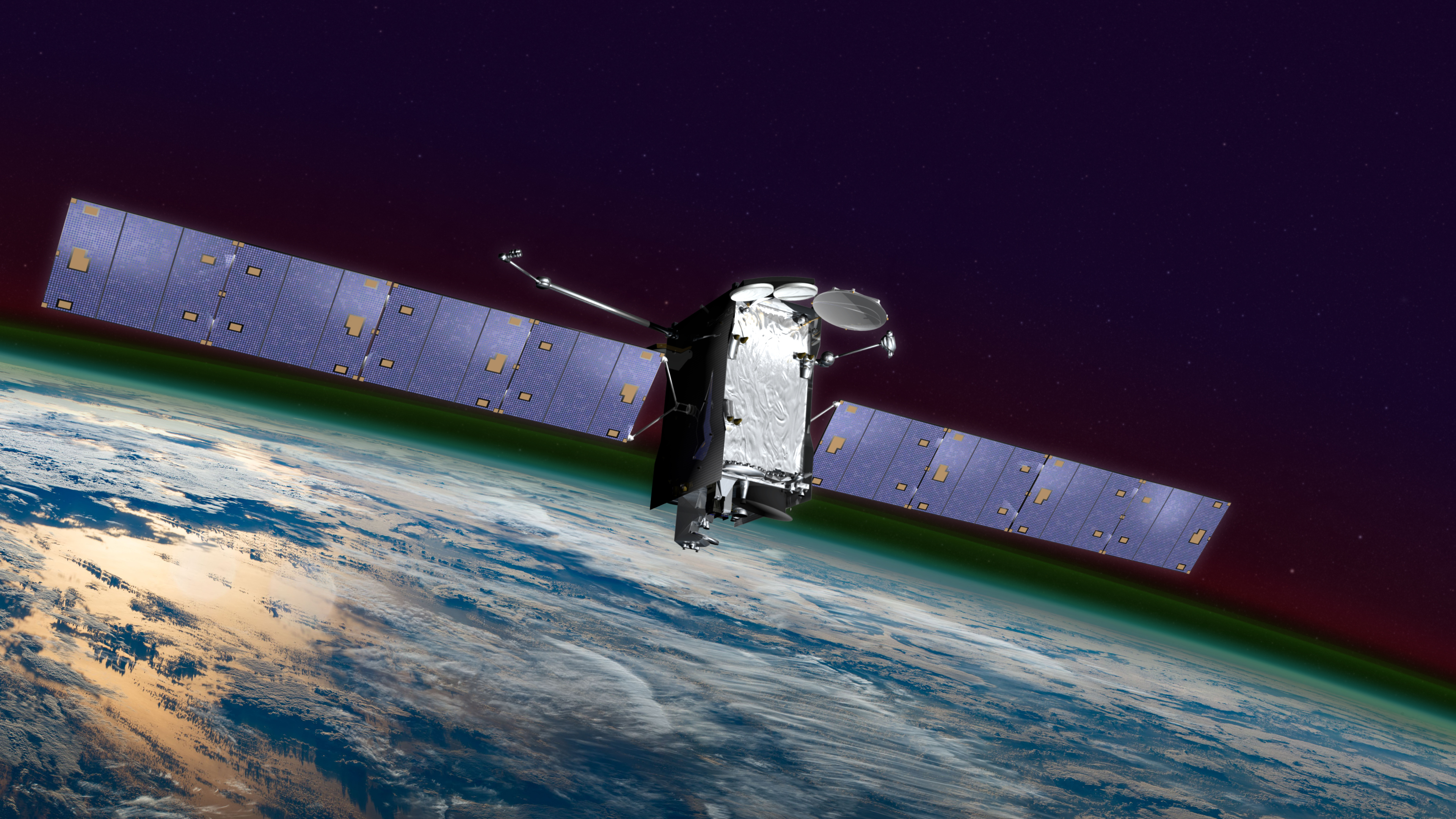
- SES-14 with GOLD (bottom left of spacecraft)
- Mission type: Communications
- Operator: SES
- COSPAR ID: 2018-012B
- SATCAT no.: 43175
- Website: https://www.ses.com/
- Mission duration: 15 years (planned); 7 years, 1 month, 9 days (elapsed)

Spacecraft properties
- Spacecraft type: Eurostar
- Bus: Eurostar-3000EOR
- Manufacturer: Airbus Defence and Space
- Launch mass: 4,423 kg (9,751 lb)
- Payload mass: 36.8 kg (81 lb) GOLD
- Dimensions: 7 m x 5.4 m x 2.7 m
- Power: 16 kW

Start of mission
- Launch date: 25 January 2018, 22:20 UTC
- Rocket: Ariane 5 ECA, VA241
- Launch site: Centre Spatial Guyanais, ELA-3
- Contractor: Arianespace
- Entered service: September 2018

Orbital parameters
- Reference system: Geocentric orbit
- Regime: Geostationary orbit
- Longitude: 47.5° West

Transponders
- Band: C-band
- Coverage area: Latin America, Caribbean, North America, Atlantic Ocean, West Africa

SES-14 is a geostationary communications satellite operated by SES at 47.5° West, replaces NSS-806, and designed and manufactured by Airbus Defence and Space. The satellite launched on 25 January 2018 at 22:20 UTC along with the Global-scale Observations of the Limb and Disk (GOLD) instrument from NASA. It has a mass of 4,423 kg (9,751 lb) and has a design life of at least 15 years.

== Launch ==
The launch of SES-14 on 25 January 2018 by an Ariane 5 ECA VA241 suffered an anomaly that resulted in a higher inclination than planned but later recovered. About 9 minutes and 28 seconds after launch, a telemetry loss occurred between the launch vehicle and the ground controllers. As confirmed about 1 hour and 20 minutes after launch both satellites were successfully separated from the upper stage and were in contact with their respective ground controllers, but that their orbital inclinations were incorrect as the guidance systems might have been compromised. Therefore, both satellites conducted orbital procedures, extending commissioning time.

== Mission ==
SES-14 needed about 8 weeks longer than planned commissioning time, meaning that entry into service was reported early September 2018 instead of July 2018. Nevertheless, SES-14 is still expected to be able to meet the designed lifetime. This satellite was originally to be launched with more propellant reserve on a Falcon 9 launch vehicle since the Falcon 9, in this specific case, was intended to deploy this satellite into a high inclination orbit that would require more work from the satellite to reach its final geostationary orbit. The Al Yah 3 was also confirmed healthy after more than 12 hours without further statement, and like SES-14, Al Yah 3's maneuvering plan was also revised to still fulfill the original mission. The investigation showed that invalid inertial units' azimuth value had sent the vehicle 17° off course but to the intended altitude, they had been programmed for the standard geostationary transfer orbit of 90° when the payloads were intended to be 70° for this supersynchronous transfer orbit mission, 20° off norme. This mission anomaly marked the end of 82nd consecutive success streak since 2003.

== See also ==
- SES
- List of SES satellites
