= HYLAS-1 =

2010 British communications satellite

- Mission type: Communication
- Operator: Avanti Communications
- COSPAR ID: 2010-065A
- SATCAT no.: 37237

Spacecraft properties
- Manufacturer: ISRO/Antrix
- Launch mass: 2,242 kilograms (4,943 lb)

Start of mission
- Launch date: 26 November 2010, 18:39:00 UTC
- Rocket: Ariane 5ECA V198
- Launch site: Kourou ELA-3
- Contractor: Arianespace

Orbital parameters
- Reference system: Geocentric
- Regime: Geostationary
- Longitude: 33.5° West
- Perigee altitude: 35,774 kilometres (22,229 mi)
- Apogee altitude: 35,801 kilometres (22,246 mi)
- Inclination: 0.05 degrees
- Period: 1,436.15 minutes
- Epoch: 16 December 2010

HYLAS (or HYLAS-1) is a British satellite in geostationary orbit. HYLAS, which is an acronym for Highly Adaptable Satellite, is a communications satellite and was launched by the European Ariane 5 launch vehicle from the Guyana Space Centre at Kourou in French Guiana. It is located at the orbital location of 33.5 degrees west and will provide new and innovative services including High Definition Television (HDTV) and interactive satellite delivered broadband services. The satellite will help address the issue of poor broadband coverage in many parts of Europe which have less developed ground infrastructure.

== Construction ==
HYLAS was constructed by EADS Astrium for the UK telecommunications company Avanti Communications Plc. Development of the satellite was supported by a £23m investment from the British National Space Centre (BNSC).

== Launch ==
Avanti purchased for HYLAS a launch to geostationary transfer orbit (GTO) on a Falcon 9 launch vehicle. The purchase, in September 2007, made Avanti the first customer to purchase a commercial geostationary launch from SpaceX. In July 2009 Arianespace announced that HYLAS would instead be launched in 2010, "using an Ariane 5 or Soyuz launcher" from Arianespace. Avanti had previously criticized Arianespace as being overly expensive, but a move to Arianespace was motivated by prospective customers' concerns about launch risks associated with Falcon 9. Also, additional financial assets became available, including 10.7 million pounds from British contributions ESA's Artes telecommunications development program.

HYLAS successfully launched at 18:41 GMT on the 26 November 2010 by Ariane 5.

== Mission ==
HYLAS is based on the Indian Space Research Organisation's I-2K small satellite platform under a cooperative arrangement between EADS Astrium and ISRO/Antrix.

The HYLAS payload carries two K_{u} band transponders, intended mainly for HDTV, and six K_{a} band transponders feeding up to eight Spotbeams, allowing the provision of between 150,000 and 300,000 simultaneous broadband Internet connections. The HYLAS satellite had a launch mass of around 2100 kg and a beginning-of-life power of 3.5 kW.

== Orbital position ==
The orbital position of HYLAS was adjusted to 18.3° West Longitude during June 2019.

== See also ==
- HYLAS-2
- HYLAS-3
