= Eutelsat 172B =

Communications satellite

- Mission type: Communications
- Operator: Eutelsat
- COSPAR ID: 2017-029B
- SATCAT no.: 42741
- Website: Eutelsat 172B
- Mission duration: 15 years (planned); 8 years, 5 months and 22 days (elapsed)

Spacecraft properties
- Bus: Eurostar-3000 EOR
- Manufacturer: Airbus Defence and Space
- Launch mass: 3,551 kg (7,829 lb)
- Power: 13kW

Start of mission
- Launch date: June 1, 2017
- Rocket: Ariane 5 ECA
- Launch site: Guiana Space Centre
- Contractor: Arianespace

Orbital parameters
- Reference system: Geocentric
- Regime: Geostationary
- Longitude: 172° E

Transponders
- Band: 14 C band transponders 36 Ku band transponders Ku band
- Coverage area: Asia-Pacific

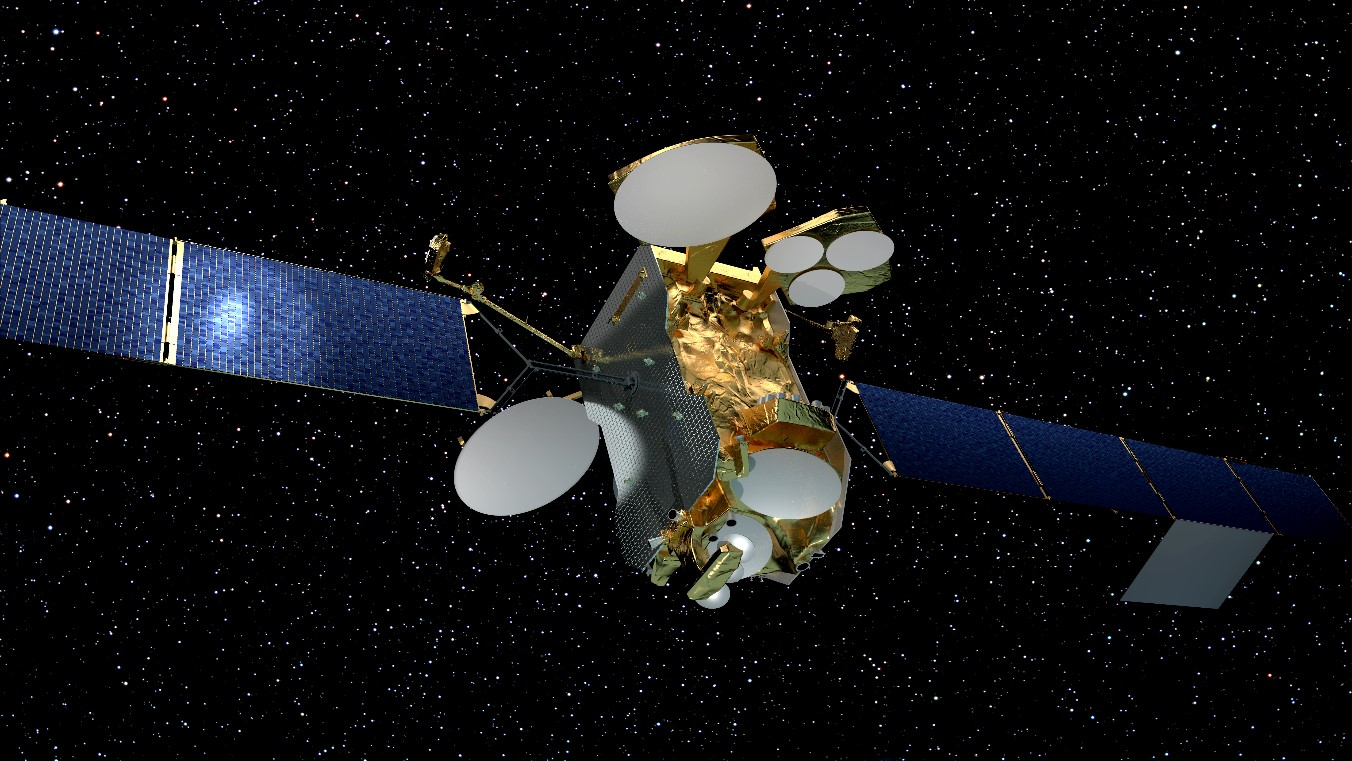

Eutelsat 172B is a French communications satellite built by Airbus Defence and Space and operated by Eutelsat Communications. Launched on June 1, 2017, it has an expected service life of 15 years. Its orbit along with Eutelsat 172A allows it to cover the Asia-Pacific region, providing enhanced broadband and broadcast services.

== Design ==
Eutelsat 172B's satellite bus is the Eurostar E3000. It has a launch mass of 3,551 kg (7,829 lb) and has two deployable solar panels. The satellite also uses the Fakel SPT140D electric propulsion thrusters for initial orbit raising and later orbit station-keeping. It took four months to go to desired altitude, however, it consumed six times less propellant than if using chemical propellant. The satellite has fourteen C band, thirty-six regular Ku band transponders, and a high-throughput Ku band.

== Launch ==
Eutelsat 172B launched from Guiana Space Centre on June 1, 2017, at 23:45 UTC, on board an Ariane 5 ECA rocket along with ViaSat-2. After launch, Eutelsat 172B used its propulsion system to raise itself into a geostationary orbit over a period of four months. It was placed at a longitude of 172° E, hence its name. Its longitude allows it to serve users in the Asia-Pacific region.
