= HYLAS 2 =

- Mission type: Communication
- Operator: Avanti Communications
- COSPAR ID: 2012-043B
- SATCAT no.: 38741
- Mission duration: 15 years

Spacecraft properties
- Bus: STAR-2
- Manufacturer: Orbital Sciences Corporation
- Launch mass: 3,325 kilograms (7,330 lb)
- Power: 5 KW

Start of mission
- Launch date: 2 August 2012
- Rocket: Ariane 5ECA
- Launch site: Kourou ELA-3
- Contractor: Arianespace

Orbital parameters
- Reference system: Geocentric
- Regime: Geostationary
- Longitude: 31.0° East

Transponders
- Band: 24 + 6 K_{a} band (NATO K band)

HYLAS 2 is a geostationary High throughput satellite operated by Avanti Communications. HYLAS, an acronym for Highly Adaptable Satellite, was launched on Ariane 5 from Guyana Space Centre at Kourou, French Guiana, on 2 August 2012.

== Construction ==
HYLAS 2 was constructed by Orbital Sciences Corporation on the STAR-2 platform for the UK telecommunications company Avanti Communications Plc.

== Features ==
HYLAS 2 features 4 active and 6 gateway Ka beams covering Northern and Southern Africa, Eastern Europe and the Middle East. HYLAS 2 is also equipped with steerable spot-beams to direct extra capacity in required areas when needed.

== See also ==
- HYLAS 1
- HYLAS 3
