= Viasat (American company) =

American satellite communications company

Viasat, Inc.
- Type: Public
- Traded as: Nasdaq: VSAT
- Industry: Satellite communications
- Founded: May 1986; 40 years ago
- Founders: Mark Dankberg; Mark Miller; Steve Hart
- Headquarters: Carlsbad, California, United States
- Key people: Mark Dankberg (chairman and CEO); Garrett Chase (CFO)
- Revenue: US$4.640 billion (2026)
- Operating income: US$108.1 million (2026)
- Net income: US$−34.1 million (2026)
- Total assets: US$15.227 billion (2026)
- Total equity: US$4.729 billion (2026)
- Number of employees: c. 7,000 (2026)
- Website: viasat.com

Viasat, Inc. is an American satellite communications company headquartered in Carlsbad, California. The company provides satellite broadband and narrowband connectivity and communications equipment for commercial aviation, maritime, enterprise, consumer, military and government customers. It operates satellites in the Ka-, L- and S-bands and also uses capacity from partner satellite networks.

Viasat was founded in 1986 by Mark Dankberg, Mark Miller and Steve Hart and became a public company in 1996. The company expanded from communications equipment into satellite services through acquisitions including WildBlue Communications in 2009 and Inmarsat in 2023. Viasat reports its business in two segments, Communication Services and Defense and Advanced Technologies.

== History ==
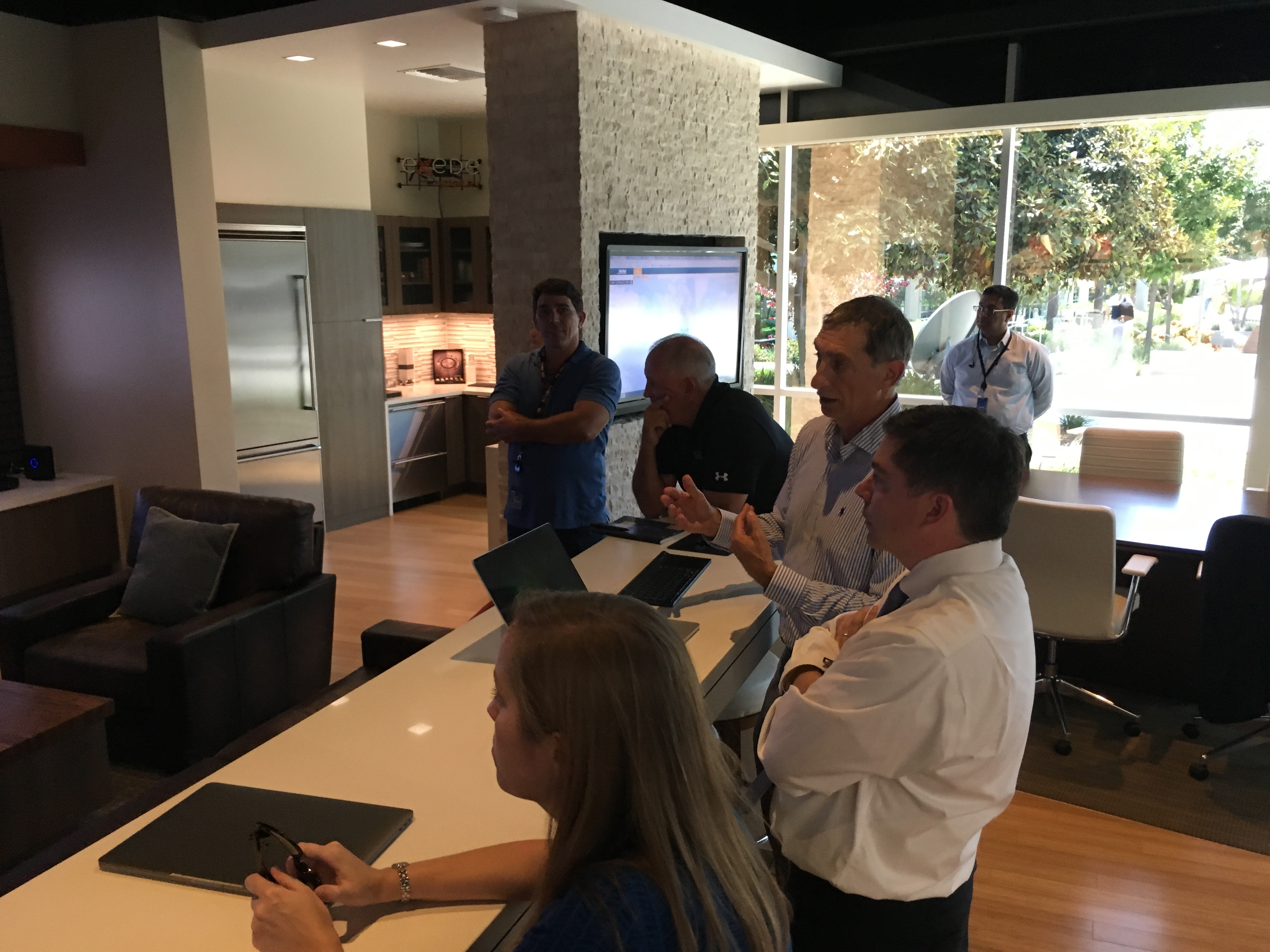
Viasat's headquarters in Carlsbad, California, in 2017

Viasat was founded in May 1986 by Mark Dankberg, Mark Miller and Steve Hart, who had previously worked at the satellite communications company Linkabit. The company initially focused on communications equipment for defense customers. Viasat held its initial public offering in December 1996 and began trading on the Nasdaq under the symbol VSAT.

Between 2000 and 2002, Viasat acquired the satellite networking business of Scientific Atlanta, satellite network terminal operations formerly belonging to Comsat Laboratories, and US Monolithics. The acquisitions expanded the company's commercial satellite communications business.

In 2009, Viasat agreed to acquire satellite internet provider WildBlue Communications for approximately $568 million in cash and stock. The acquisition was completed in December 2009, giving Viasat an established residential satellite internet business ahead of the launch of ViaSat-1.

Viasat announced an agreement to acquire British satellite operator Inmarsat in November 2021. The transaction underwent competition and national-security reviews in several jurisdictions before Viasat completed the acquisition on May 30, 2023. Viasat paid approximately $550.7 million in cash and issued 46.36 million shares as consideration for Inmarsat.

Before completing the Inmarsat transaction, Viasat sold its Link 16 Tactical Data Links business to L3Harris for approximately $1.96 billion in January 2023.

== Operations ==
Viasat organizes its operations into two reportable segments: Communication Services and Defense and Advanced Technologies. In fiscal 2026, Communication Services generated $3.30 billion in revenue and Defense and Advanced Technologies generated $1.34 billion.

=== Communication services ===
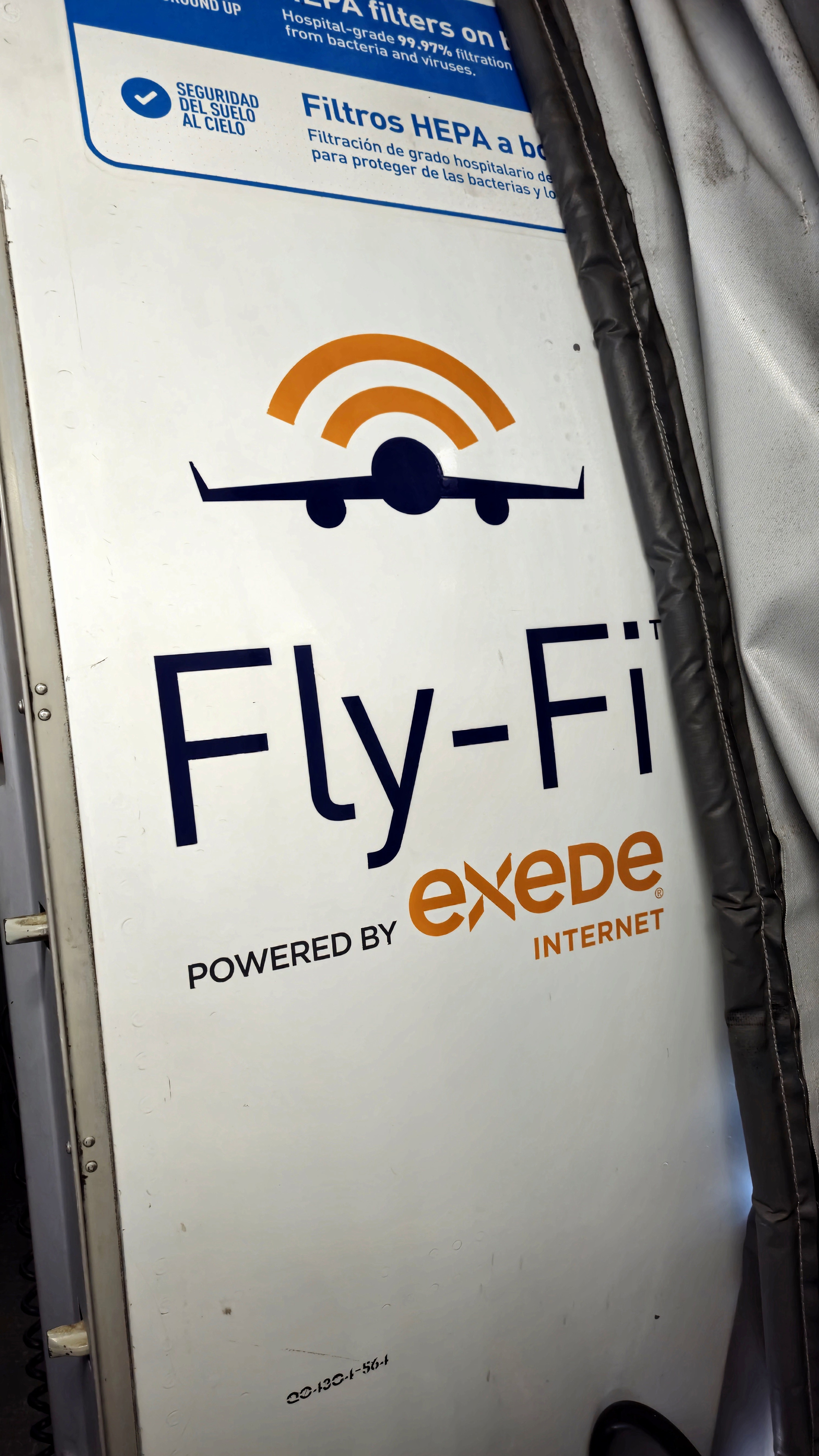
JetBlue's Fly-Fi service using Viasat satellite connectivity

The Communication Services segment provides broadband and narrowband satellite services and related equipment. Its principal businesses include aviation, government satellite communications, maritime services, and fixed and enterprise services.

As of March 31, 2026, Viasat's in-flight connectivity systems were installed and in service on approximately 4,580 commercial aircraft and about 2,100 business jets. The company also provided Ka-band communications services to approximately 13,200 vessels. Its U.S. fixed broadband business had approximately 130,000 subscribers.

Viasat also provides narrowband mobile satellite services, including safety and operational communications for aviation and maritime users, through the L-band network acquired with Inmarsat.

=== Defense and advanced technologies ===
The Defense and Advanced Technologies segment develops communications and cybersecurity products for government and commercial customers. Its business lines include information security and cyber defense, space and mission systems, tactical networking, and other advanced communications technologies. Products developed by the segment include encryption systems, satellite communications terminals and modems, tactical networking equipment, antennas and satellite payload technologies.

In fiscal 2026, the segment generated $1.34 billion in revenue.

== Satellite fleet ==
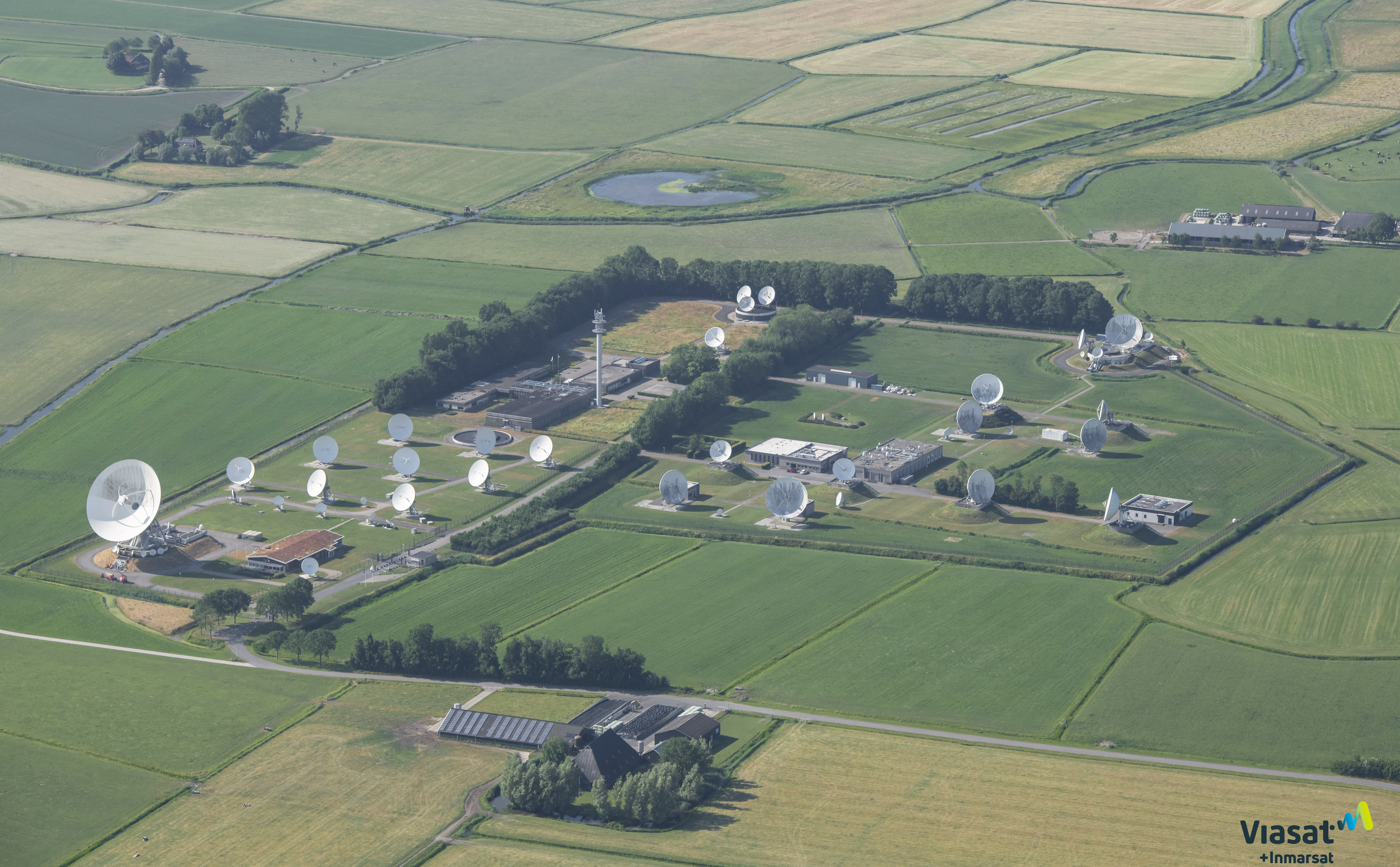
The Viasat and Inmarsat satellite ground station at Burum, Netherlands

Viasat operates a multi-band satellite fleet assembled through its own satellite programs and the acquisition of Inmarsat. As of March 31, 2026, the company reported 23 in-service or operational satellites spanning the Ka-, L- and S-bands. The fleet consisted of 13 Ka-band satellites, eight L-band satellites, one S-band satellite and one hybrid Ka-/L-band satellite. Viasat also purchases capacity on satellites operated by other companies.

The company's high-capacity Ka-band satellites include ViaSat-1, ViaSat-2 and the ViaSat-3 series. The first ViaSat-3 spacecraft, covering the Americas, entered the operational fleet after completing in-orbit testing in July 2024. The second spacecraft, ViaSat-3 F2, was launched in November 2025, and ViaSat-3 F3 was launched in April 2026.

Viasat's fleet also includes satellites acquired with Inmarsat, including L-band spacecraft used for mobile satellite and safety services. The company has also been developing the GX7, GX8 and GX9 Ka-band satellites and four Inmarsat-8 L-band satellites.

== Cybersecurity incidents ==
On February 24, 2022, a cyberattack disrupted the KA-SAT satellite network operated by Viasat at the start of the Russian invasion of Ukraine. The attack caused communications outages in Ukraine and elsewhere in Europe. In May 2022, the European Union attributed the operation to the Russian Federation.

In June 2025, Viasat was identified as a victim of the Chinese-linked Salt Typhoon cyberespionage campaign. Viasat said an investigation with an independent cybersecurity firm found unauthorized access through a compromised device but no evidence that customers were affected. The company said the intrusion had been remediated and that it had not detected subsequent activity related to the incident.
