= Geostationary transfer orbit =

Transfer orbit used to reach geosynchronous or geostationary orbit

An example of an orbit raise maneuver: a transition from GTO to GEO.
EchoStar XVII's trajectory · Earth.

In space mission design, a geostationary transfer orbit (GTO) or geosynchronous transfer orbit is a highly elliptical type of geocentric orbit, usually with a perigee as low as low Earth orbit (LEO) and an apogee as high as geostationary orbit (GEO). Satellites that are destined for geosynchronous orbit (GSO) or GEO are often put into a GTO as an intermediate step for reaching their final orbit. Manufacturers of launch vehicles often advertise the amount of payload the vehicle can put into GTO.

== Background ==
Geostationary and geosynchronous orbits are very desirable for many communication and Earth observation satellites. However, the delta-v, and therefore financial, cost to send a spacecraft to such orbits is very high due to their high orbital radius. A GTO is an intermediary orbit used to make this process more efficient. Satellite operators often use a high-thrust, low-efficiency launch vehicle to put their satellite into GTO, and then, after detaching the launch vehicle, use low-thrust, high-efficiency thrusters onboard the satellite itself to circularise its orbit (to GEO). This mission architecture is useful because it minimises the mass that the spacecraft must push to GEO, allows for maximally efficient circularisation burns taking advantage of the Oberth effect, and allows the spent launch vehicle to deorbit primarily through aerobraking due to its low perigee, minimising its orbital lifetime.

== Technical description ==
GTO is a highly elliptical Earth orbit with an apogee of 42,164 km (26,199 mi), or a height of 35,786 km (22,236 mi) above sea level, which corresponds to the geostationary altitude. The period of a standard geosynchronous transfer orbit is about 10.5 hours. The argument of perigee is such that apogee occurs on or near the equator. Perigee can be anywhere above the atmosphere, but is usually restricted to a few hundred kilometres above the Earth's surface to reduce launcher delta-V ($\Delta V$) requirements and to limit the orbital lifetime of the spent booster so as to curtail space junk.

If using low-thrust engines such as electric propulsion to get from the transfer orbit to geostationary orbit, the transfer orbit can be supersynchronous (having an apogee above the final geosynchronous orbit). However, this method takes much longer to achieve due to the low thrust injected into the orbit. The typical launch vehicle injects the satellite to a supersynchronous orbit having the apogee above 42,164 km. The satellite's low-thrust engines are thrusted continuously around the geostationary transfer orbits. The thrust direction and magnitude are usually determined to optimize the transfer time and/or duration while satisfying the mission constraints. The out-of-plane component of thrust is used to reduce the initial inclination set by the initial transfer orbit, while the in-plane component simultaneously raises the perigee and lowers the apogee of the intermediate geostationary transfer orbit. In case of using the Hohmann transfer orbit, only a few days are required to reach the geosynchronous orbit. By using low-thrust engines or electrical propulsion, months are required until the satellite reaches its final orbit.

The orbital inclination of a GTO is the angle between the orbit plane and the Earth's equatorial plane. It is determined by the latitude of the launch site and the launch azimuth (direction). The inclination and eccentricity must both be reduced to zero to obtain a geostationary orbit. If only the eccentricity of the orbit is reduced to zero, the result may be a geosynchronous orbit but will not be geostationary. Because the $\Delta V$ required for a plane change is proportional to the instantaneous velocity, the inclination and eccentricity are usually changed together in a single maneuver at apogee, where velocity is lowest.

The required $\Delta V$ for an inclination change at either the ascending or descending node of the orbit is calculated as follows:

$$\Delta V = 2 V \sin \frac{\Delta i}{2}.$$

For a typical GTO with a semi-major axis of 24,582 km, perigee velocity is 9.88 km/s and apogee velocity is 1.64 km/s, clearly making the inclination change far less costly at apogee. In practice, the inclination change is combined with the orbital circularization (or "apogee kick") burn to reduce the total $\Delta V$ for the two maneuvers. The combined $\Delta V$ is the vector sum of the inclination change $\Delta V$ and the circularization $\Delta V$, and as the sum of the lengths of two sides of a triangle will always exceed the remaining side's length, total $\Delta V$ in a combined maneuver will always be less than in two maneuvers. The combined $\Delta V$ can be calculated as follows:

$$\Delta V = \sqrt{ V_{t,a}^2 + V_\text{GEO}^2 - 2 V_{t,a} V_\text{GEO} \cos \Delta i},$$

where $V_{t,a}$ is the velocity magnitude at the apogee of the transfer orbit and $V_\text{GEO}$ is the velocity in GEO.

== Other considerations ==
Even at apogee, the fuel needed to reduce inclination to zero can be significant, giving equatorial launch sites a substantial advantage over those at higher latitudes. Russia's Baikonur Cosmodrome in Kazakhstan is at 46° north latitude. Kennedy Space Center in the United States is at 28.5° north. China's Wenchang is at 19.5° north. India's SDSC is at 13.7° north. Guiana Space Centre, the European Ariane and European-operated Russian Soyuz launch facility, is at 5° north. The "indefinitely suspended" Sea Launch launched from a floating platform directly on the equator in the Pacific Ocean.

Expendable launchers generally reach GTO directly, but a spacecraft already in a low Earth orbit (LEO) can enter GTO by firing a rocket along its orbital direction to increase its velocity. This was done when geostationary spacecraft were launched from the Space Shuttle; a "perigee kick motor" attached to the spacecraft ignited after the shuttle had released it and withdrawn to a safe distance.

Although some launchers can take their payloads all the way to geostationary orbit, most end their missions by releasing their payloads into GTO. The spacecraft and its operator are then responsible for the maneuver into the final geostationary orbit. The 5-hour coast to first apogee can be longer than the battery lifetime of the launcher or spacecraft, and the maneuver is sometimes performed at a later apogee or split among multiple apogees. The solar power available on the spacecraft supports the mission after launcher separation. Also, many launchers now carry several satellites in each launch to reduce overall costs, and this practice simplifies the mission when the payloads may be destined for different orbital positions.

Because of this practice, launcher capacity is usually quoted as spacecraft mass to GTO, and this number will be higher than the payload that could be delivered directly into GEO.

For example, the capacity (adapter and spacecraft mass) of the Delta IV Heavy is 14,200 kg to GTO, or 6,750 kg directly to geostationary orbit.

If the maneuver from GTO to GEO is to be performed with a single impulse, as with a single solid-rocket motor, apogee must occur at an equatorial crossing and at synchronous orbit altitude. This implies an argument of perigee of either 0° or 180°. Because the argument of perigee is slowly perturbed by the oblateness of the Earth, it is usually biased at launch so that it reaches the desired value at the appropriate time (for example, this is usually the sixth apogee on Ariane 5 launches). If the GTO inclination is zero, as with Sea Launch, then this does not apply. (It also would not apply to an impractical GTO inclined at 63.4°; see Molniya orbit.)

The preceding discussion has primarily focused on the case where the transfer between LEO and GEO is done with a single intermediate transfer orbit. More complicated trajectories are sometimes used. For example, the Proton-M uses a set of three intermediate orbits, requiring five upper-stage rocket firings, to place a satellite into GEO from the high-inclination site of Baikonur Cosmodrome, in Kazakhstan. Because of Baikonur's high latitude and range safety considerations that block launches directly east, it requires less delta-v to transfer satellites to GEO by using a supersynchronous transfer orbit where the apogee (and the maneuver to reduce the transfer orbit inclination) are at a higher altitude than 35,786 km, the geosynchronous altitude. Proton even offers to perform a supersynchronous apogee maneuver up to 15 hours after launch.

The geostationary orbit is a special type of orbit around the Earth in which a satellite orbits the planet at the same rate as the Earth's rotation. This means that the satellite appears to remain stationary relative to a fixed point on the Earth's surface. The geostationary orbit is located at an altitude of approximately 35,786 kilometers (22,236 miles) above the Earth's equator.

== See also ==
- Astrodynamics
- Low Earth orbit
- List of orbits
- Aeronautics
