= ViaSat-2 =

Communications satellite

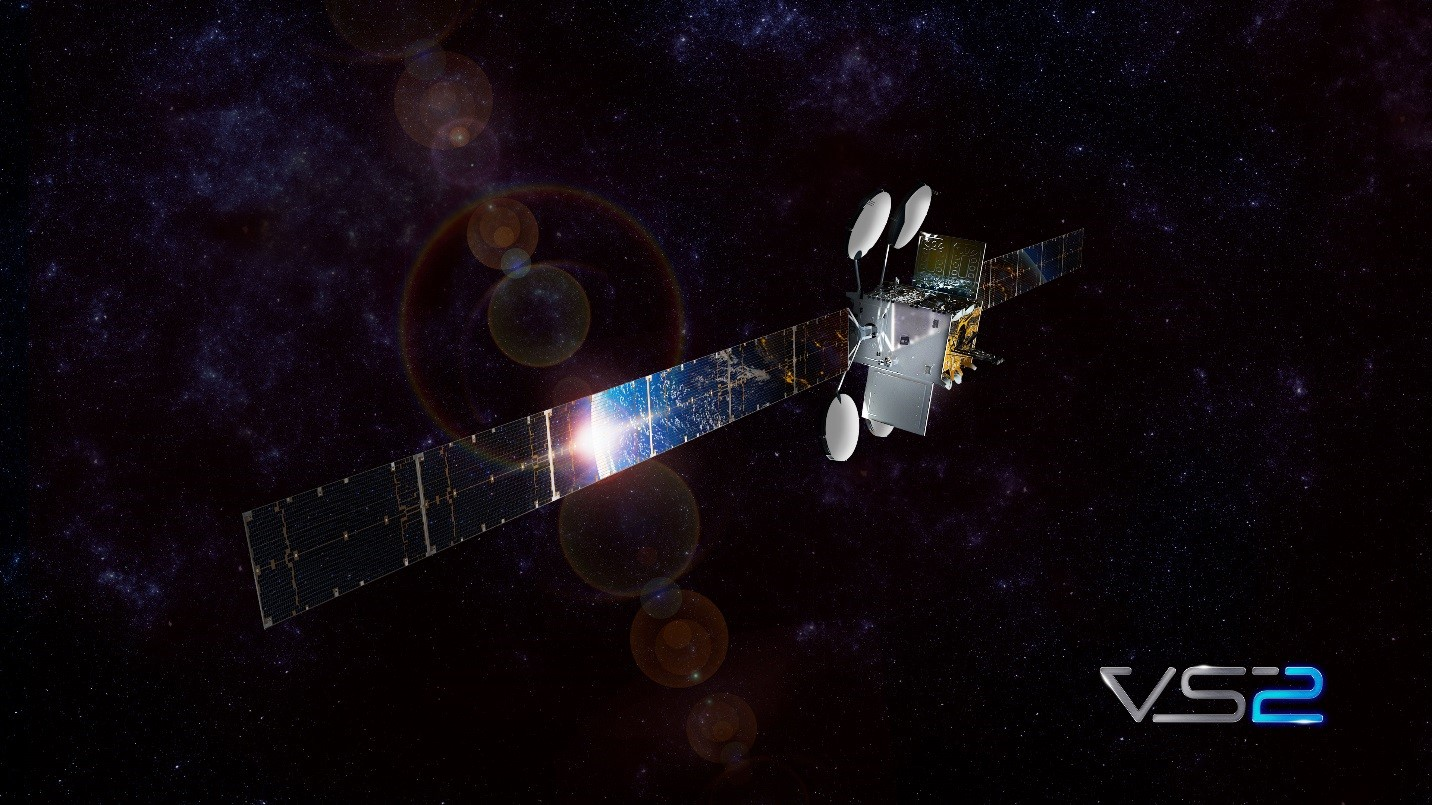
- Mission type: Communication
- Operator: ViaSat
- COSPAR ID: 2017-029A
- SATCAT no.: 42740
- Mission duration: 15 years (planned); 8 years, 10 months, 28 days (elapsed)

Spacecraft properties
- Manufacturer: Boeing
- Launch mass: 14,110 lb (6,400 kg)
- BOL mass: 6,418 kg

Start of mission
- Launch date: June 1, 2017
- Rocket: Ariane 5
- Contractor: Arianespace
- Deployment date: June 1, 2017

Orbital parameters
- Reference system: Geocentric
- Regime: Geostationary orbit
- Longitude: 69.9° West

Transponders
- Band: Ka-band

ViaSat-2 is a commercial communications satellite launched June 1, 2017 and went live late February 2018. It was advertised to be the world's highest capacity communications satellite with a throughput of 300 Gbit/s, exceeding that of HughesNet EchoStar XIX, which launched in December 2016. It is the second Ka-band satellite launched by ViaSat after ViaSat-1. The satellite provides internet service through ViaSat (Exede prior to rebranding) to North America, parts of South America, including Mexico and the Caribbean, and to air and maritime routes across the Atlantic Ocean to Europe.

== History ==
In May 2013, ViaSat gave the construction contract of the satellite to Boeing. On May 1, 2014 ViaSat sold capacity on the satellite to Xplornet Communications. In January 2015, ViaSat gave the launch contract to SpaceX in an uncontested auction. After SpaceX CRS-7 exploded after launch in June 2015, concerns arose that the investigation may affect the mission's launch window. On February 9, 2016 Arianespace announced it had won contracts to launch ViaSat-2 and ViaSat-3 in 2017 and 2019, respectively.

ViaSat-2 was launched on June 1, 2017 by Arianespace from the Guiana Space Centre in French Guiana. The launch date was originally set for April 25, 2017 but was delayed due to social unrest affecting the spaceport area. ViaSat-2 successfully arrived in geostationary orbit at 69.9 degrees west longitude on December 5, 2017. The satellite employed a hybrid propulsion approach, using both traditional chemical as well as electric propulsion. The chemical propulsion subsystem was responsible for initial orbit raising and performing according to plan, setting the state for the follow-on ascent to geostationary orbit using electric propulsion, which was completed the last week of November 2017. Viasat spacecraft partner, Boeing Satellite Systems International, controlled and monitored ViaSat-2 throughout the orbit raising process, flying the satellite from its Mission Control Center in El Segundo, California.

== Functionality ==
The $600 million satellite was intended to have a 300 Gbit/s throughput, up from ViaSat-1's 140 Gbit/s in 2011. It uses Ka-band frequencies.

Problems with two of the four Ka-band antennae, leading to a less optimal coverage pattern than designed have reduced throughput to 260 Gbit/s.

== See also ==
- 2017 in spaceflight
