= Intelsat 29e =

American satellite manufactured by Boeing

- Names: IS-29e
- Mission type: Communications
- Operator: Intelsat
- COSPAR ID: 2016-004A
- SATCAT no.: 41308
- Website: Intelsat IS-29e
- Mission duration: 15 years (planned); 3 years (achieved)

Spacecraft properties
- Spacecraft: Intelsat 29e
- Spacecraft type: Boeing 702
- Bus: Boeing 702MP
- Manufacturer: Boeing Satellite Development Center
- Launch mass: 6,552 kg (14,445 lb)
- Dimensions: 7.5 m × 3 m × 2 m (24.6 ft × 9.8 ft × 6.6 ft)
- Power: 15.8 kW

Start of mission
- Launch date: 27 January 2016, 23:20 UTC
- Rocket: Ariane 5 ECA (VA-228)
- Launch site: Centre Spatial Guyanais, ELA-3
- Contractor: Arianespace

End of mission
- Last contact: 8 April 2019

Orbital parameters
- Reference system: Geocentric orbit
- Regime: Geosynchronous orbit
- Longitude: 50° West

Transponders
- Band: 77 transponders: 20 C-band; 56 Ku-band; 1 Ka-band
- Bandwidth: C-band: 864 MHz; Ku-band: 9,395 MHz; Ka-band: 450 MHz
- Coverage area: United States, Latin America, North America

Intelsat 29e, also known as IS-29e, was a high throughput (HTS) geostationary communications satellite designed and manufactured by Boeing Satellite Development Center on the BSS 702MP satellite bus. It is the first satellite of the Intelsat Epic^{NG} service, and covers North America and Latin America from the 50° West longitude, where it replaced Intelsat 1R. It also replaced Intelsat 805 which was moved from 56.5° West to 169° East. It has a mixed C-band, Ku-band and Ka-band payload with all bands featuring wide and the Ku- also featuring spot beams.It suffered a fuel leak in 2019 and declared a total loss.

== Satellite description ==
The spacecraft was designed and manufactured by Boeing Satellite Development Center on the Boeing 702MP satellite bus. It has a launch mass of 6,552 kg (14,445 lb) and a design life of more than 15 years. When stowed for launch, the satellite measures 7.5 m × 3 m × 2 m (24.6 ft × 9.8 ft × 6.6 ft).

It is powered by two wings, with four solar panels each, of triple-junction GaAs solar cells, that span 44 m (144 ft) when deployed. Intelsat 29e can generate 15.8 kW at the end of its expected life and has four Li-ion batteries.

This three axis stabilized platform has a bi-propellant propulsion system using Nitrogen tetroxide (NTO) / N_{2}O_{4}. It has a 449 N (101 lb_{f}) liquid apogee engine for orbit raising and 22 N (4.9 lb_{f}) and 4 N (0.90 lb_{f}) thrusters for station keeping. The propellant tanks hold approximately 1,550 kg (3,420 lb) of N_{2}O_{4} and 2,000 kg (4,400 lb) of NTO. This new series of geosynchronous satellites lack an Earth Sensor, and thus enter Earth pointing attitude based on the orbital position as determined by the star tracker.

Its payload is the first high throughput Epic^{NG} deployment, of the six planned as of January 2016. The Epic^{NG} is characterized by the implementation of frequency reuse due to a mix of frequency and polarization in small spot beams. Not only applied to the classical High-throughput satellite Ka-band, but also applying the same technique in Ku-band and C-band. The Epic^{NG} series also keep the use of wide beams to offer high throughput and broadcast capabilities in the same satellite.

The payload is designed and manufactured by Boeing based on the work of the Wideband Global SATCOM (WGS) constellation. It most innovative feature of this fully digital payload, is that it enables to dynamically link two sites through a single satellite without needing to go through a ground station.

In the case of Intelsat-29e, the C-band side has 14 physical transponders with a bandwidth 864 MHz Ku- or 24 transponder equivalent. It covers South America in a wide beam. The Ku-band has physical 56 transponders (249 transponder equivalent) for a total bandwidth of 9,395 MHz. The Ku- spot beams cover the Americas and the North Atlantic route, while a wide beam can broadcast to North America and North Atlantic. The Ka-band payload has 450 MHz of bandwidth on a global beam centered at its position.

== History ==
In July 2009, Intelsat became the first customer of the Boeing 702MP platform, when it placed an order for four spacecraft, Intelsat 21, Intelsat 22, Intelsat 27 and what would become Intelsat 29e.

On 7 June 2012, Intelsat announced the Epic^{NG} platform. It would improve available bandwidth due to the use of frequency reuse and polarization and feature spot and wide beams, enabling high bandwidth and broadcast applications on a backward compatible way. The first two satellites would be Intelsat 29e and Intelsat 33e. On 4 September 2012, Intelsat and Boeing announced that Intelsat 29e, the first Epic^{NG} satellite, would be made by Boeing on the 702MP platform, completing the 2009 order of four such satellites.

In May 2013, Intelsat ordered a further four 702MP-based Epic^{NG} satellites, Intelsat 32e, Intelsat 33e and two as of August 2016 unnamed spacecraft. And in July 2014, a sixth Epic was ordered, Intelsat 35e. During 2013, Intelsat signed a contract to launch Intelsat 29e aboard an Ariane 5. Brian Sing, was assigned as Senior Program Manager for the launch aboard the rocket.

During June 2015, the payload was integrated and went through testing. First it was deployed and stowed back, then it went through sound environment and vibration testing, and finally deployment was tested again. On 14 July 2015, the payload integration to the satellite bus and its non-environmental testing was completed. It would then go through the environmental testing campaign which would start with thermal vacuum chamber tests. It is a Boeing design based on the work of the Wideband Global SATCOM (WGS) constellation. On 10 December 2015, Intelsat announced that the launch date for Intelsat 29e had been set for 27 January 2016.

After four years of project development, Intelsat 29e arrived to the launch site aboard an Antonov 124 on 11 December 2015. At the site's Payload Processing Facility (PPF), Boeing technicians unpackaged the spacecraft and associated equipment and performed a quick fit check. On the second weeks of January 2016, the satellite was fueled and installed in the rocket payload adapter. By 21 January 2016, the spacecraft had been moved to the Final Assembly Building where it was mated to the launcher rocket. On 26 January 2016, all checks were completed and the launch review for the next day was completed.

On 27 January 2016, at 23:20 UTC, an Ariane 5 ECA launched from the ELA-3 launch pad at the Centre Spatial Guyanais. Intelsat 29e, its only passenger, separated 30 minutes later, and the satellite first signals were received shortly afterwards by the Kumsan, South Korea, ground station. The next two days were spent evaluating the health of the satellite and determining the exact orbit, then a series of nine orbital maneuvers to raise the perigee to 35,786 km (22,236 mi) were started. This orbit circularization would consume approximately 2,500 kg (5,500 lb) of propellant.

When it reached its test position at 49.7° West, it deployed its antennas and solar panels. In a 28 March 2016, it was announced that Intelsat 29e had successfully passed the 30-day payload in-orbit testing (PIOT) and was undergoing the first performance testing with an anchor customer. It had been particularly challenging because it was the first digital configurable payload for Intelsat, and they had to also test the ground segment for the first time.

On 7 April 2019, the propulsion system of Intelsat 29e developed a fuel leak. Service to customers was interrupted, and communication with the satellite intermittent. On 8 April 2019, the ground telescopes of ExoAnalytic Solutions spotted debris around Intelsat 29e. IS-29e is currently tumbling and drifting to the East. Intelsat issued a statement declaring the satellite a total loss on 18 April 2019. The failure was later attributed to two possible causes. The first was a micrometeorite impact. The second possible cause was said to be a combination of a short circuit caused by solar activity and harness issue within the spacecraft. The loss of IS-29e would be followed up on 19 October 2024 by the break-up of IS-33e, another one of Intelsat’s Epic^{NG} (next-generation) satellites. As of current, any correlation between the two incidents remains to be determined.
