= Intelsat 35e =

Communications satellite

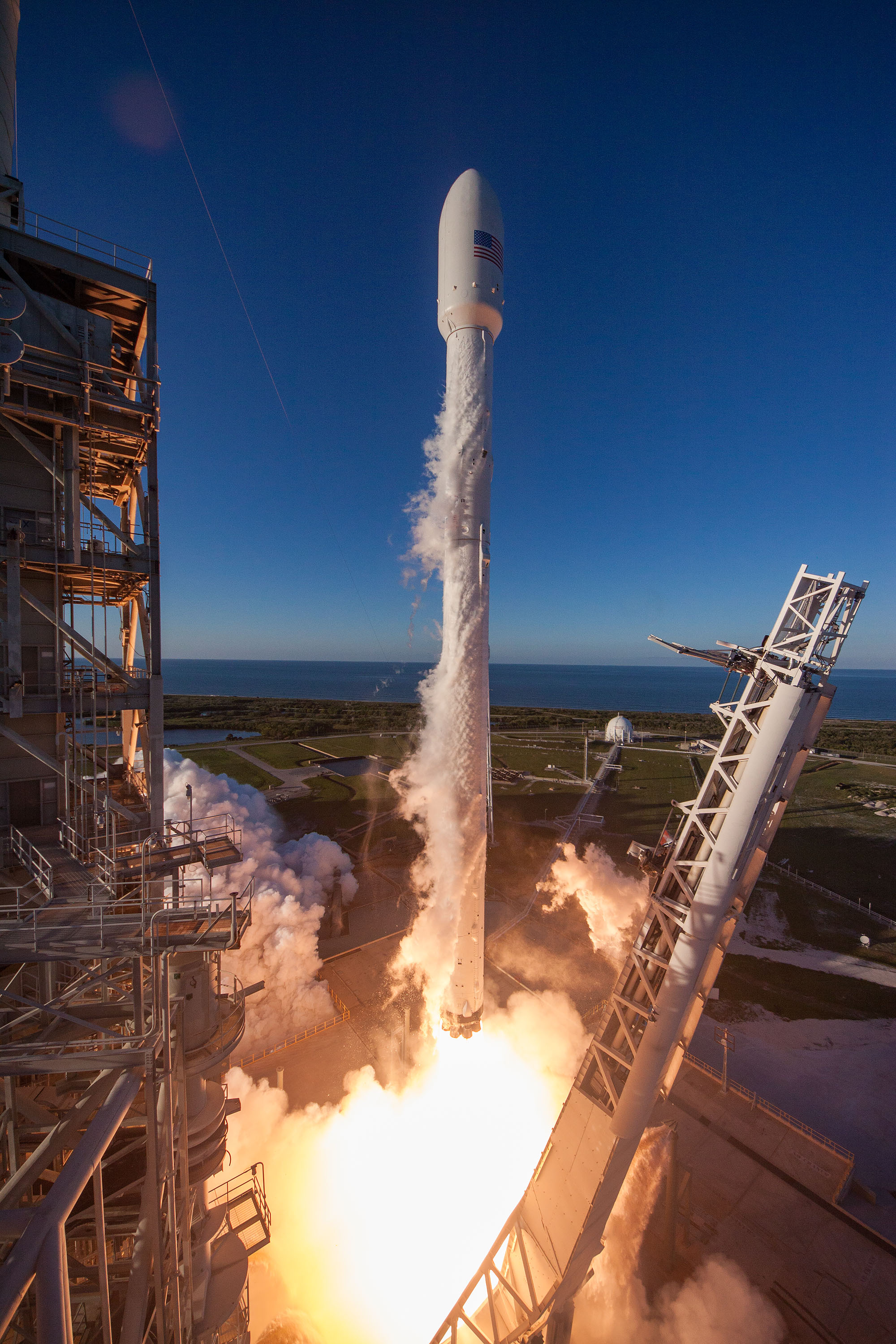
- Intelsat 35e launch
- Names: IS-35e
- Mission type: Communications
- Operator: Intelsat
- COSPAR ID: 2017-041A
- SATCAT no.: 42818
- Website: Intelsat 35e
- Mission duration: 15 years (planned)

Spacecraft properties
- Spacecraft: Intelsat 35e
- Spacecraft type: Intelsat Epic^{NG}
- Bus: Boeing 702MP
- Manufacturer: Boeing Satellite Systems
- Launch mass: 6,761 kg (14,905 lb)
- Power: 12 kW

Start of mission
- Launch date: 5 July 2017, 23:38 UTC
- Rocket: Falcon 9 Full Thrust
- Launch site: KSC, LC-39A
- Contractor: SpaceX

Orbital parameters
- Reference system: Geocentric orbit
- Regime: Geostationary orbit
- Longitude: 34.5° West

Transponders
- Band: 151 equivalent transponders: C-band: 112 (equivalent - 36 MHz) high-throughput (HTS) spot beams, plus wide beams Ku-band: 39 (equivalent)
- Bandwidth: C-band: 4,356 MHz; Ku-band: 1,404 MHz
- Coverage area: Americas, Caribbean, Europe, North Africa, Sub-Saharan Africa

Intelsat 35e, also known as IS-35e, is an Intelsat high-throughput (HTS) geostationary communications satellite designed and manufactured by Boeing Satellite Systems on the Boeing-702MP satellite bus. It was launched on 5 July 2017.

It is the fourth satellite of the Epic^{NG} service and covers the Americas, Europe and Sub-Saharan Africa from the 34.5° West longitude. It has a mixed C-band and Ku-band, with the C-band featuring Epic^{NG} spot beams.

== Satellite description ==
Intelsat 35e was designed and manufactured by Boeing Satellite Systems on the Boeing 702MP satellite bus. It had a launch mass of 6,761 kg (14,905 lb), the largest Intelsat's currently active satellite, and has a design life of more than 15 years.

It is powered by two wings, with four solar panels each, of triple-junction GaAs solar cells. The 702MP platform was designed to generate between 6 and 12 kW.

Its payload was the fourth high-throughput Epic^{NG} deployment. The Epic^{NG} is characterized by the implementation of frequency reuse due to a mix of frequency and polarization in small-spot beams. Not only applied to the classical HTS Ka-band, but also applying the same technique in Ku-band and C-band. The Epic^{NG} series also keep the use of wide beams to offer high throughput and broadcast capabilities in the same satellite.

In the case of Intelsat 35e, the C-band side has Epic^{NG} spot beams with a total downlink bandwidth of 4,356 MHz. The spot beams offer high bandwidth for Europe, Sub-Sahara Africa, and the Americas. The Ku-band has 39 transponder equivalents for a total downlink bandwidth of 1,404 MHz. Of the Ku-band three wide beams, one is covering the Caribbean, another Europe and the Mediterranean, and the third beams cover Europe and North Africa.

== History ==
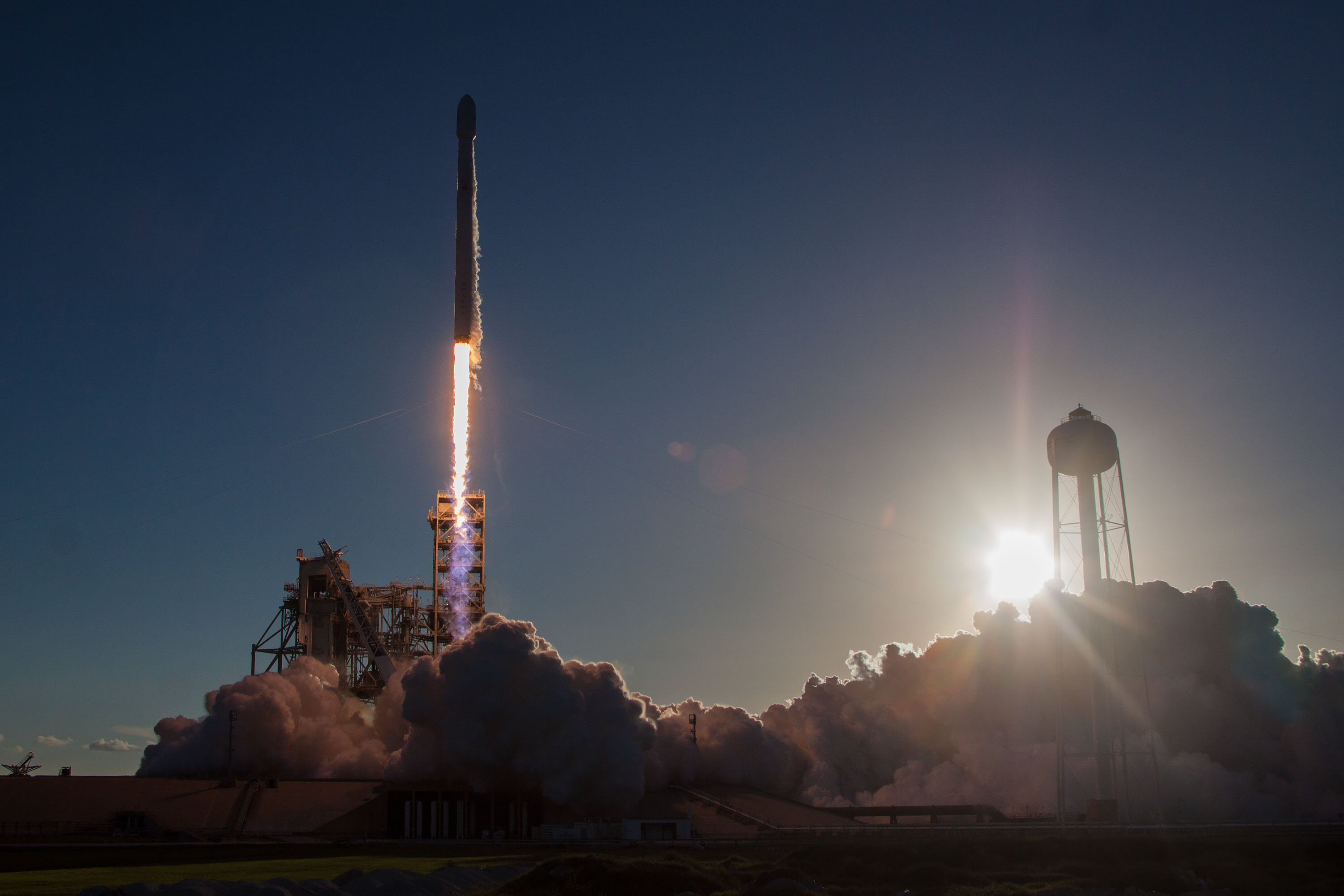
Launch of Intelsat 35e satellite at Cape Canaveral.

In July 2009, Intelsat became the first customer of the Boeing 702MP satellite bus, when it placed an order for four spacecraft to be built, Intelsat 21, Intelsat 22, Intelsat 27 and the first Epic^{NG} satellite, Intelsat 29e. In May 2013, Intelsat contracted for an additional four Epic^{NG} satellites, the first of which would be Intelsat 33e. On 8 July 2014, Boeing announced a ninth 702MP order, and sixth EpicNG, for the Intelsat 35e. During 2014, Intelsat announced to service contract where the clients would start using Intelsat 903 at the 34.5° West position and then seamlessly transfer their services to Intelsat 35e as soon as it was commissioned into service.

=== Launch history ===
Following two aborted launch attempts earlier in July 2017, Intelsat 35e was launched on 5 July 2017 from the SpaceX-leased launch pad 39A (LC-39A) in Florida. No attempt to recover the first-stage booster was made on this launch, as the first stage was flown in expendable mode in order to maximize the orbital energy imparted to this high-mass communications satellite.

During an interview with Intelsat's CEO Stephen Spengler in February 2016, it was disclosed that Intelsat 35e was expected to launch in 2017. In August 2016, it emerged that the launch was assigned to a Falcon 9 Full Thrust mission scheduled for the first quarter of 2017. Performance improvements of the Falcon 9 vehicle family enable the launch of this 6-tonne satellite without upgrading to a Falcon Heavy variant.

Intelsat 35e was initially prepared for launch on 2 July 2017 from launch pad 39A, with a 59-minute-duration launch window. The first launch attempt was aborted at T-9 seconds in the countdown for a GNC-criteria violation. With insufficient time to recycle, the launch was scrubbed and next attempt was scheduled with a 24-hour delay. This second launch attempt was made on 3 July 2017, and it too was aborted by the onboard computers at the same T minus 9 seconds in the countdown. Having already been pushed to the end of the launch window with no time to recycle, this resulted in a scrub for the second consecutive day. Intelsat 35e could have been rescheduled for a 4 July 2017 launch. However, in the event, the 4 July 2017 launch was postponed — per SpaceX, "out of an abundance of caution" — prior to loading propellants. A complete check of the systems both on the rocket and on the pad was performed.

Intelsat 35e was successfully launched and placed in orbit on 5 July 2017.
