= Intelsat 33e =

Communications satellite

- Names: IS-33e; Intelsat 33 Epic^{NG}
- Mission type: Communications
- Operator: Intelsat
- COSPAR ID: 2016-053B
- SATCAT no.: 41748
- Website: Intelsat IS-33e
- Mission duration: 8 years, 1 month, 24 days (achieved); 15 years (planned)

Spacecraft properties
- Spacecraft: Intelsat 33e
- Spacecraft type: Boeing 702
- Bus: BSS 702MP
- Manufacturer: Boeing Satellite Systems
- Launch mass: 6,600 kg (14,600 lb)
- Dimensions: 7.9 × 3.8 × 3.2 m (26 × 12 × 10 ft)
- Power: 13 kW

Start of mission
- Launch date: 24 August 2016, 22:16:01 UTC
- Rocket: Ariane 5 ECA (VA‑232)
- Launch site: Guiana, ELA-3
- Contractor: Arianespace
- Entered service: 29 January 2017

End of mission
- Disposal: Breakup
- Destroyed: 19 October 2024, ~04:30 UTC

Orbital parameters
- Reference system: Geocentric orbit
- Regime: Geostationary orbit
- Longitude: 60° East

Transponders
- Band: High throughput (HTS): C-band: 20; Ku-band: 249 (36 MHz equivalent); Ka-band: (450 MHz)
- Bandwidth: C-band: 2,670 MHz (downlink); Ku-band: 9,194 MHz (downlink); Ka-band: 450 MHz
- Coverage area: Europe, Central Africa, Middle East, Asia, Australia

Intelsat 33e, also known as IS-33e, was a high throughput (HTS) geostationary communications satellite operated by Intelsat and designed and manufactured by Boeing Space Systems on the BSS 702MP satellite bus. It was the second satellite of the Epic^{NG} service, and covered Europe, Africa and most of Asia from the 60° East longitude, where it replaced Intelsat 904. It had a mixed C-band, Ku-band and Ka-band payload with all bands featuring wide and C- and Ku- also featured spot beams.

After nearly eight years in service, the satellite broke into at least 57 pieces on 19 October 2024. As of December 2024, over 700 pieces of debris have been detected.

== Satellite description ==
Intelsat 33e was designed and manufactured by Boeing on the Boeing 702MP satellite bus. It had a launch mass of 6,600 kg (14,600 lb) and a design life of more than 15 years. When stowed for launch, the satellite measured 7.9 m × 3.8 m × 3.2 m (26 ft × 12 ft × 10 ft).

It was powered by two solar panels, with four panels each, of triple-junction GaAs solar cells. The 702MP platform was designed to generate between 6 kW and 12 kW, but Intelsat 33e was designed to generate 13 kW at the end of its design life.

Its payload was the second high throughput Epic^{NG} deployment. The Epic^{NG} is characterized by the implementation of frequency reuse due to a mix of frequency and polarization in small spot beams. Not only applied to the classical High-throughput satellite (HTS) Ka-band, but also applying the same technique in Ku-band and C-band. The Epic^{NG} series also keep the use of wide beams to offer high throughput and broadcast capabilities in the same satellite.

In the case of Intelsat 33e, the C-band side had 20 transponders with a total downlink bandwidth of 2,670 MHz. The spot beams offered high bandwidth for Europe, Central Africa, Middle East, Asia and Australia, and a wide beam covered sub-Saharan Africa. The Ku-band had 249 transponder equivalents, for a total downlink bandwidth of 9,194 MHz. The Ku-band spot beams covered Europe, Africa, the Middle East and Asia, while a wide beam was able to broadcast to Europe, Middle East and Asia. The Ka-band payload had 450 MHz of bandwidth on a global beam centered at its position.

== History ==
In July 2009, Intelsat became the first customer of the Boeing 702MP satellite bus, when it placed an order for four spacecraft, Intelsat 21, Intelsat 22, Intelsat 27 and the first Epic^{NG} satellite, Intelsat 29e. In May 2013, Intelsat made a second order for an additional four Epic^{NG} satellites, the first of which would be Intelsat 33e.

On 15 July 2016, Senior Space Program Managers Richard Laurie and Brian Sing blogged that they had been at the Boeing factory overseeing the transport preparations for Intelsat 33e to French Guiana. There it would join another Intelsat satellite, Intelsat 36, for integration on the Ariane 5 ECA launcher, which was expected to launch on 24 August 2016. On 22 July 2016, Intelsat announced that Intelsat 33e had arrived to the Guiana Space Center for launch preparations. It also announced not only communication but aeronautical and maritime mobility clients that were expecting the satellite service. On 27 July 2016, it was explained that the satellite had traveled by truck from the factory to an airport in California, where it was loaded in an Antonov 124. It flew to Florida for a refuelling stop and then flew straight to Kourou airport. At the French launch site, even though Intelsat is the owner of the two passengers of the Ariane 5 ECA VA 232 flight, they have separate launch teams. Each satellite is built by a different manufacturer, and it has a different supervisor team within Intelsat.

On 24 August 2016, at 22:16:01 UTC, after a slight delay due to a rocket issue, the Ariane 5 ECA VA-232 flight launched from Guiana Space Center ELA-3, with Intelsat 33e and Intelsat 36. At 22:44 UTC, Intelsat 33e separated from the rocket's upper stage. After 41 minutes of flight, both satellites had separated successfully. Intelsat confirmed that it had received the satellites signals as expected after separation. Arianespace estimated the insertion orbit as 248.7 km × 35,858 km × 5.98°, very close to the target of 249.0 km × 35,879 km × 6.00°.

On 9 September 2016, Intelsat announced that due to a malfunction in the LEROS-1c primary thruster, it would require more time for orbit rising and thus the service date had been moved from the last quarter of 2016 to the first of 2017. On 22 September 2016, insurance officials estimated that the main propulsion failure would not reduce the on orbit life of the spacecraft more than 18 months. This could translate to an insurance claim by Intelsat of around 10% (1.5 years) of the satellite service life, which could have a value close to US$40 million. Intelsat 33e entered service on 29 January 2017, three months later than planned.

In August 2017, another propulsion issue appeared, leading to larger-than-expected propellant usage to control the satellite attitude during the north/south station keeping maneuvers. This issue reduced the orbital life-time by about 3.5 years.

=== Disintegration ===
Late on 19 October 2024, U.S. Space Command reported that the satellite had broken up into about 20 pieces at approximately 04:30 UTC that morning. At least 700 pieces of space debris associated with the event have since been detected. Intelsat declared the satellite a total loss on 21 October 2024. The 2024 loss was not insured, unlike the earlier malfunction of the satellite in 2016.

The satellite's predecessor, Intelsat 29e, also suffered a premature failure and was rendered inoperable after only three years in service.
