= ABS-2A =

All-electric propulsion commercial communications satellite

- Mission type: Communications
- Operator: ABS
- COSPAR ID: 2016-0038A
- SATCAT no.: 41588
- Mission duration: 15 years (planned)

Spacecraft properties
- Bus: Boeing 702SP
- Manufacturer: Boeing
- Launch mass: 4,972 pounds (2,255 kg)
- Dry mass: 4,266 pounds (1,935 kg)
- Power: >13.3kW at 15 years

Start of mission
- Launch date: June 15, 2016, 15:05:00 UTC
- Rocket: Falcon 9 Full Thrust
- Launch site: Cape Canaveral SLC-40
- Contractor: SpaceX

Orbital parameters
- Reference system: Geocentric
- Regime: Geostationary
- Longitude: 75° East

Transponders
- Band: 48 Ku band
- Frequency: 13.750-14.800, 17.300-18.100 / 10.950-11.200, 11.450-12.750 (Ku band)
- Bandwidth: 54 MHz, 72 MHz, 108 MHz
- TWTA power: 150 watts (Ku band)

ABS-2A is an all-electric propulsion commercial communications satellite which is owned and operated by ABS. Co-located with ABS-2 at the 75°E orbital position, the satellite provides coverage over markets in South East Asia, Africa, MENA and Russia. The satellite is equipped with 48 Ku-band transponder and is designed for DTH services, cellular backhaul, VSAT, maritime and mobility solutions.

== Manufacture and specifications ==
The satellite was designed and manufactured by Boeing, and is a Boeing 702SP model communication satellite. It was launched on board a SpaceX Falcon 9 rocket on 15 June 2016. The satellite lifted off as part of a dual launch and was the second deployment at 11:05 a.m. EDT.

The satellite is propelled solely by electrically powered spacecraft xenon propulsion, with the on-board thrusters used for both geostationary orbit insertion and station keeping.

The satellite utilizes five Ku-band beams and covers South East Asia, Africa, MENA and Russia.

== Launch ==
The launch occurred on 15 June 2016 at 11.05 a.m. EDT and the satellite was deployed in the planned supersynchronous transfer orbit at 11:40 a.m. EDT.

== On-orbit operations ==
The satellite became fully operational as a geosynchronous communications satellite on 21 January 2017 after orbit raising and in-orbit tests by Boeing and a handover from Boeing to ABS for on-orbit operations.
