= Boeing 702 =

Satellite bus designed and manufactured by Boeing

Boeing Space Systems (BSS-702) Bus
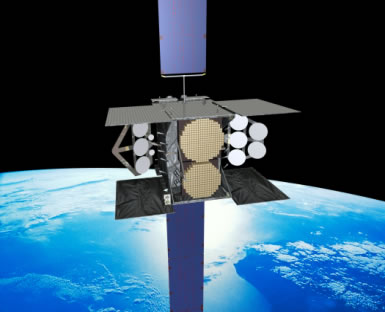
- WGS (Wideband Global Satcom) satellite
- Manufacturer: Boeing Defense, Space & Security
- Country of origin: United States
- Applications: Communications

Specifications
- Launch mass: 1,500 to 6,100 kg (3,300 to 13,400 lb)
- Payload capacity: 200 to 1,620 kg (440 to 3,570 lb)
- Power: 3 to 18 kW
- Regime: Geostationary
- Design life: 15 years

Production
- Status: In production
- On order: 60
- Launched: 47
- Lost: 3
- Maiden launch: December 22, 1999 (Galaxy XI)
- Last launch: November 14, 2025 (ViaSat-3)

Boeing 702 is a communication satellite bus family designed and manufactured by the Boeing Satellite Development Center, and flown from the late-1990s into the 2020s. It covers satellites massing from 1,500 kg (3,300 lb) to 6,100 kg (13,400 lb) with power outputs from 3 to 18 kW and can carry up to approximately 100 high-power transponders.

The baseline Boeing 702 is compatible with several orbital launch systems, including Atlas V, Ariane 5, Delta IV, Falcon 9, Proton, and the Sea Launch-operated Zenit 3SL.

== Platform versions ==
After the introduction of the original 702 in 1997, the platform has been continually updated. New members of the platform have been introduced through the years, which allowed the common systems and approaches to span the whole range of mass and power for geosynchronous orbit satellites. The family currently spans four different members: the 702HP for high-power applications, the 702HP-GEO for mobile-telephone services, the 702MP for medium-power requirements and the 702SP for small satellites.

Boeing 702 platform family
Platform	702HP	702HP-GEO	702MP	702SP
Year of introduction	1997	1997	2009	2012
First launch	1999	2000	2012	2015
First customer	PanAmSat	SkyTerra	Intelsat	Asia Broadcast Satellite and SatMex (joint order)
Payload mass	600 kg (1,300 lb) to 1,620 kg (3,570 lb)	1,250 kg (2,760 lb) to 1,480 kg (3,260 lb)	300 kg (660 lb) to 650 kg (1,430 lb)	200 kg (440 lb) to 680 kg (1,500 lb)
Power, kW	>12	8–10	6–12	3–8
Spacecraft mass	5,400 kg (11,900 lb) to 5,900 kg (13,000 lb)	5,100 kg (11,200 lb) to 5,900 kg (13,000 lb)	5,800 kg (12,800 lb) to 6,100 kg (13,400 lb)	1,500 kg (3,300 lb) to 2,300 kg (5,100 lb)

=== 702HP ===
The high-power 702 platform was originally announced in October 1998. With the 2009 introduction of the 702MP "mid-power version", the legacy Boeing 702 platform, which had been continuously evolved, was designated the Boeing 702HP for "high-power". According to Moog-ISP, the 702HP platform uses its bipropellant thrusters.

The SES-9, a 702HP model, launched aboard the Falcon 9 Flight 22 on 4 March 2016.

=== 702 GEO-Mobile ===
Developed in 1997 for their launch customer Thuraya, it is a special version of the 702HP platform with a 12.25-meter deployable antenna, onboard digital signal processing, and beamforming. It is a specialized platform for direct service of mobile users.

=== 702MP ===
In 2009, Boeing introduced the 702MP platform, a mid-power solution based on the high-power 702HP platform. The 702MP provides the high-capability features inherent in the flight-proven Boeing 702HP satellite model, but with a substantially updated satellite bus structure and simplified propulsion system. The 702MP was designed for satellites in the middle-level power ranges, supporting payloads ranging from 6 to 12 kilowatts. According to Moog-ISP, the 702MP platform uses both its bipropellant thrusters and LEROS liquid apogee engine.

Intelsat is the lead customer for the 702MP. Boeing built Intelsat 21, Intelsat 22, Intelsat 27, and Intelsat 29e, the first EpicNG satellites based on the platform. In May 2013, Intelsat ordered an additional four EpicNG satellites from Boeing. The first of this new order will be Intelsat 33e. In July 2014, Boeing announced the order of a ninth Intelsat 702MP order, the EpicNG Intelsat 35e.

On January 15, 2015, the SatNews Publishers disclosed Boeing's second 702MP customer. New York Broadband LLC would order an L-band satellite Silkwave 1 to be fully leased to CMMB Vision of Hong Kong. The satellite is expected to enter service in 2018 in the 105° east orbital slot to replace AsiaStar.

=== 702SP ===
By 2005, Boeing was offering a Xenon Electrostatic ion thruster System (XIPS) option for the 702 satellite system. XIPS is 10 times more efficient than conventional liquid-fuel systems. On a XIPS equipped 702 satellite, four 25 cm (9.8 in) thrusters provide economical station keeping, needing only 5 kg (11 lb) of fuel per year, "a fraction of what bipropellant or arcjet systems consume". An XIPS-equipped satellite can be used for final orbit insertion, conserving even more payload mass, as compared to using a traditional on-board liquid apogee engine.

Beginning in 2012, Boeing began manifesting all-electric propulsion commsats on the 702SP XIPS propulsion bus for eventual location in geosynchronous orbit. These satellites were the first to be launched with the intent to fully position the satellites using electric propulsion, thus requiring 4–6 months following launch to ready the satellite for its communication mission, but at substantial reduction in launch mass and, therefore, launch cost.

As of March 2014, Boeing had sold four of the 702SP satellites to Asia Broadcast Satellite (ABS) of Hong Kong and Mexico's SatMex, with the first two commsats planned for a paired launch in early 2015.

In November 2014, Boeing released information that two of the 702SP satellites they have built—ABS-3A and Eutelsat 115 West B—had completed manufacture and had been stacked conjoined as they prepared for a launch on a SpaceX Falcon 9 vehicle in early 2015. This was to be Boeing's first conjoined launch of two commsats. The two commsats were launched aboard a SpaceX rocket from Cape Canaveral, Florida, at 3:50AM UTC on 2 March 2015 (10:50PM EST on 1 March 2015).

In February 2014, SES announced that it had ordered a Boeing 702SP-based sat for SES-15.

In March 2014, Boeing disclosed an early-2013 order by an unnamed U.S. government agency for three 702SP spacecraft.

In June 2015, Asia Broadcast Satellite (ABS) ordered an additional 702SP, ABS-8, planned to be launched by late 2017, in part because they were well satisfied with performance of ABS-3A, even before it reached its operative orbit. When launched on a Falcon 9, the total investment for ABS was sufficiently low that it would be acceptable even if another satellite to pair on the launch was not added. ABS later cancelled the order after failing to successfully finance the project, in part related to changes to the mechanisms of the Ex-Im Bank during 2015. As of 2015, Boeing and ABS considering other business agreement options.

== Customers ==
Customer	702HP Satellites	702HP GEO-Mobile	702MP Satellites	702SP Satellites	Comments
Asia Broadcast Satellite				ABS-2A; ABS-3A; ABS-8 (cancelled)	
DirecTV	DirecTV-10; DirecTV-11; DirecTV-12				
Eutelsat				Eutelsat 115 West B; Eutelsat 117 West B	
Global IP Cayman	GiSAT-1				
Hughes Communications	Spaceway F1; Spaceway F2; Spaceway F3				
Inmarsat	Inmarsat-5 F1; Inmarsat-5 F2; Inmarsat-5 F3; Inmarsat-5 F4				
Intelsat			Intelsat 21; Intelsat 22; Intelsat 27; Intelsat 29e; Intelsat 33e; Intelsat 35e		Plus 3 unnamed EpicNG
Mexican Government		MEXSAT 1 (Centenario); MEXSAT 2 (Morelos 3)			
New Skies	NSS-8 (with XIPS)				plus 2 options
New York Broadband LLC			Silkwave 1 (NYBBSat 1)		
PanAmSat	Galaxy XI; Galaxy III-C; PAS-1R				
Telesat Canada	Anik F1; Anik F2				
SES	SES-9			SES-15; SES-20; SES-21	
SkyTerra		SkyTerra 1 (ex MSV 1); SkyTerra-2 (cancelled)			
Thuraya		Thuraya 1; Thuraya 2; Thuraya 3			
Unnamed U.S. Government agency				3 Unspecified Satellites	
United States Air Force	Wideband Global SATCOM system				10 firm
ViaSat	ViaSat-2				
XM Satellite Radio	XM 1 "Rock"; XM 2 "Roll"; XM 3 "Rhythm"; XM 4 "Blues"				

== Orders and launches ==
Customer	Satellite	Ordered	Launched	Result	Rocket	Model	Launch mass (kg)	Mass at BOL	Notes and references							
PanAmSat	Galaxy XI	1997	1999-12-22	Success	Ariane 44L	BSS-702 (concentrator arrays)	4488	2775	degradation of solar concentrators - long term power loss							
Thuraya	Thuraya 1	1997	2000-10-21	Success	Zenit-3SL	702HP-GEO (Concentrator Arrays)	5108	3200	degradation of solar concentrators - long term power loss							
PanAmSat	Intelsat 1R (formerly PAS-1R and Galaxy XIV)	1997	2000-11-16	Success	Ariane 5 G	BSS-702 (concentrator arrays)	4758	2990	degradation of solar concentrators - long term power loss							
Telesat Canada	Anik F1	1998	2000-11-21	Success	Ariane 44L	BSS-702 (concentrator arrays)	4711	2950	degradation of solar concentrators - long term power loss							
XM Satellite Radio	XM-2 (Roll)	1998	2001-03-18	Success	Zenit-3SL	BSS-702 (concentrator arrays)	4682	2950	degradation of solar concentrators - long term power loss							
XM Satellite Radio	XM-1 (Rock)	1998	2001-05-08	Success	Zenit-3SL	BSS-702 (concentrator arrays)	4682	2950	degradation of solar concentrators - long term power loss							
PanAmSat	Galaxy III-C (formerly PAS 9 and Galaxy XIII)	1997	2002-06-15	Success	Zenit-3SL	BSS-702HP	4810	2835								
Thuraya	Thuraya 2	1997	2003-06-10	Success	Zenit-3SL	702HP-GEO	5177	3200								
Telesat Canada	Anik F2	2000	2004-07-18	Success	Ariane 5 G+	BSS-702HP	5950	3805								
XM Satellite Radio	MX-3 (Rhythm)	2003	2005-03-01	Success	Zenit-3SL	BSS-702HP	4703									
Hughes Communications	Spaceway F1	1999	2005-04-26	Success	Zenit-3SL	BSS-702HP	6080	3832								
Hughes Communications	Spaceway F2	1999	2005-11-16	Success	Ariane 5 ECA	BSS-702HP	6116	3832								
XM Satellite Radio	XM-4 (Blues)	2003	2006-10-30	Success	Zenit-3SL	BSS-702HP	5193									
New Skies	NSS-8	2001	2007-01-30	Failure	Zenit-3SL	BSS-702HP	5920	3800	Plus 2 options							
DirecTV	DirecTV-10	2004	2007-07-07	Success	Proton-M / Briz-M	BSS-702HP	5893	3700								
Hughes Communications	Spaceway F3	1999	2007-08-14	Success	Ariane 5 ECA	BSS-702HP	6116	3832								
United States Air Force	WGS 1 (USA 195)	2002	2007-10-11	Success	Atlas V (421)	BSS-702HP	5987									
Thuraya	Thuraya 3	2002	2008-01-15	Success	Zenit-3SL	702HP-GEO	5250	3200								
DirecTV	DirecTV-11	2004	2008-03-19	Success	Zenit-3SL	BSS-702HP	5923	3700								
United States Air Force	WGS 2 (USA 204)	2002	2009-04-04	Success	Atlas V (421)	BSS-702HP	5987									
United States Air Force	WGS 3 (USA 211)	2002	2009-12-06	Success	Delta IV M+(5,4)	BSS-702HP	5987									
DirecTV	DirecTV-12	2004	2009-12-29	Success	Proton-M / Briz-M	BSS-702HP	6060	3700								
SkyTerra	SkyTerra-1 (ex MSV 1)	2006	2010-11-14	Success	Proton-M / Briz-M	702HP-GEO	5390	3200								
United States Air Force	WGS 4 (USA 233)	2006	2012-01-20	Success	Delta IV M+(5,4)	BSS-702HP										
Intelsat	Intelsat 22	2009	2012-03-25	Success	Proton-M / Briz-M	BSS-702MP	6199									
Intelsat	Intelsat 21	2009	2012-08-19	Success	Zenit-3SL	BSS-702MP	5984									
Intelsat	Intelsat 27	2010	2013-02-01	Failure	Zenit-3SL	BSS-702MP	6241									
United States Air Force	WGS 5	2006	2013-05-25	Success	Delta IV M+(5,4)	BSS-702HP										
United States Air Force	WGS 6	2007	2013-08-08	Success	Delta IV M+(5,4)	BSS-702HP										
Inmarsat	Inmarsat-5 F1	2010	2013-12-08	Success	Proton-M / Briz-M	BSS-702HP	6070	3750								
Inmarsat	Inmarsat-5 F2	2010	2015-02-01	Success	Proton-M / Briz-M	BSS-702HP	6070	3750								
Asia Broadcast Satellite	ABS-3A	2012	2015-03-02	Success	Falcon 9 v1.1	BSS-702SP	1954									
Eutelsat	Eutelsat 115 West B (ex SATMEX 7)	2012	2015-03-02	Success	Falcon 9 v1.1	BSS-702SP	2205									
Mexican Government	MEXSAT 1 (Centenario)	2010	2015-05-16	Failure	Proton-M / Briz-M	702HP-GEO	5325									
United States Air Force	WGS 7	2011	2015-07-24	Success	Delta IV M+(5,4)	BSS-702HP										
Inmarsat	Inmarsat-5 F3	2010	2015-08-28	Success	Proton-M / Briz-M	BSS-702HP	6070	3750								
Mexican Government	MEXSAT 2 (Morelos 3)	2010	2015-10-02	Success	Atlas V (421)	702HP-GEO	5325									
Intelsat	Intelsat 29e	2012	2016-01-27	Success	Ariane 5 ECA	BSS-702MP	6552		Developed a fuel leak in April 2019, during attempts to recover satellite it experienced another anomaly and debris was spotted around satellite. Declared lost.							
SES	SES-9	2012	2016-03-04	Success	Falcon 9 FT	BSS-702HP	5330									
Asia Broadcast Satellite	ABS-2A	2012	2016-06-15	Success	Falcon 9 FT	BSS-702SP										
Eutelsat	Eutelsat 117 West B (ex SATMEX 9)	2012	2016-06-15	Success	Falcon 9 FT	BSS-702SP	1963									
Intelsat	Intelsat 33e	2013	2016-08-24	Success	Ariane 5 ECA	BSS-702MP			Satellite broke up 19 October 2024.							
United States Air Force	WGS 8	2011	2016-12-07	Success	Delta IV M+(5,4)	BSS-702HP										
United States Air Force	WGS 9	2012	2017-03-08	Success	Delta IV M+(5,4)	BSS-702HP										
SES	SES-15	2015	2017-05-18	Success	Soyuz ST-B / Fregat-MT	BSS-702SP	2300									
Inmarsat	Inmarsat-5 F4	2013	2017-05-15	Success	Falcon 9 FT	BSS-702HP	6070	3750								
ViaSat	ViaSat-2	2013	2017-06-01	Success	Ariane 5 ECA	BSS-702HP	6400									
Intelsat	Intelsat 35e	2014	2017-07-05	Success	Falcon 9 FT	BSS-702MP										
Intelsat	Intelsat 37e	2013	2017-09-17	Success	Ariane 5 ECA	BSS-702MP										
Intelsat	Horizons-3e	2015	2018-09-25	Success	Ariane 5 ECA	BSS-702MP										
United States Air Force	WGS 10	2012	2018-03-19	Success	Delta IV M+(5,4)	BSS-702HP										
Spacecom	Amos-17	2016	2019-08-06	Success	Falcon 9 FT	BSS-702MP	6500									
SKY Perfect JSAT	JCSat 18/Kacific 1	2017	2019-12-16	Success	Falcon 9 FT	BSS-702MP	6800									
SES	SES-20	2020	2022-10-04	Operational	Atlas V 531	BSS-702SP										
SES	SES-21	2020	2022-10-04	Operational	Atlas V 531	BSS-702SP										
PT Pasifik Satelit Nusantara	Nusantara Lima (Nusantara-5)	2022	2025-09-11	Success	Falcon 9 FT	BSS-702MP	7800									
ViaSat	ViaSat-3 EMEA (F2)	2016	2025-11-14	Success	Atlas V 551	BSS-702HP	6400			New York Broadband LLC	Silkwave 1 (NYBBSat 1)	2015	TBD	Planned	BSS-702MP	~6000
Intelsat	Intelsat TBD	2013	202x	Planned		BSS-702MP										
ViaSat	ViaSat-3 Americas	2016	2023-05-01	Partial failure	Falcon Heavy	BSS-702HP	6418		Experienced antenna-deployment anomaly that limited throughput to <10%.							
ViaSat	ViaSat-3 APAC	2019	TBD	Planned	Falcon Heavy	BSS-702HP	6400									
ViaSat	ViaSat-3 (option)			TBA		BSS-702HP	6400		Option							
United States Air Force	WGS 11	2019	2025	Planned	Vulcan Centaur	BSS-702X										
United States Air Force	WGS 12	2024	2027	Planned		BSS-702X										
Unnamed U.S. Government agency	(US Gov 1)	2013	TBA	TBA		BSS-702SP										
Unnamed U.S. Government agency	(US Gov 2)	2013	TBA	TBA		BSS-702SP										
Unnamed U.S. Government agency	(US Gov 3)	2013	TBA	TBA		BSS-702SP										
APMT	APMT 1	1998	Cancelled	Cancelled	Long March 3B	702HP-GEO (Concentrator Arrays)			Order cancelled after manufacturer failed to get an export license for launching on a Chinese rocket							
APMT	APMT 2	1998	Cancelled	Cancelled	Long March 3B	702HP-GEO (Concentrator Arrays)			Order cancelled after manufacturer failed to get an export license for launching on a Chinese rocket							
Asia Broadcast Satellite	ABS-8	2015	TBD	Cancelled	Falcon 9 FT	BSS-702SP			Order cancelled due to the U.S. Export-Import Bank's loss of its operating charter due to congressional opposition							
Global IP Cayman	GiSAT-1	2016	TBD	Cancelled		BSS-702MP	6000		Order cancelled after the company was the center of controversies, as Chinese investors had taken control of Global IP.							
Mobile Satellite Ventures	MSV SA	2006	Cancelled	Cancelled		702HP-GEO	5400	3200								
SkyTerra	SkyTerra 2 (ex MSV 2)	2006	Cancelled	Cancelled	Proton-M / Briz-M	702HP-GEO	5400	3200								
