= 35E =

35E may refer to:

- Area of Concentration 35E, a United States Army officer occupational specialty
- Intelsat 35e, satellite operated by Intelsat
- Interstate 35E (Texas), a 97-mile (156 km) long branch route serving Dallas, Texas
- Interstate 35E (Minnesota), a 41-mile (66 km) long branch route serving St. Paul, Minnesota
- Kh-35E, variant of Russian missile Kh-35
