= Nusantara (disambiguation) =

Nusantara is a city under construction that, upon completion, is planned to be the capital city of Indonesia

Nusantara may also refer to:

- Nusantara (term), an Old Javanese term which initially referred to the conquered territories of the Majapahit empire, corresponding to present-day Indonesia
- Nusantara Air Charter, an Indonesian airline which operates charter flights
- Nusantara International Airport, an airport serving Nusantara, Indonesia
- Nusantara Lima, an Indonesian satellite
- Nusantara Satu, an Indonesian satellite
- Nusantara Society, a Russian non-profit society for intellectuals
- Nusantara TV, an Indonesian private-commercial digital terrestrial television network
