= Eutelsat 115 West B =

European communications satellite

- Names: Satmex 7 (2012–2014); Eutelsat 115 West B (2014–present)
- Mission type: Communications
- Operator: Eutelsat
- COSPAR ID: 2015-010B
- SATCAT no.: 40425
- Mission duration: 15 years (planned)

Spacecraft properties
- Bus: Boeing 702SP
- Manufacturer: Boeing
- Launch mass: 4,861 pounds (2,205 kg)

Start of mission
- Launch date: March 2, 2015, 03:50 UTC
- Rocket: Falcon 9 v1.1
- Launch site: Cape Canaveral SLC-40
- Contractor: SpaceX
- Entered service: October 15, 2015

Orbital parameters
- Reference system: Geocentric
- Regime: Geostationary
- Longitude: 114.9° West
- Perigee altitude: 35,793 kilometres (22,241 mi)
- Apogee altitude: 35,795 kilometres (22,242 mi)
- Inclination: 0.0 degrees
- Period: 1436.1 minutes
- Epoch: 19 March 2015, 01:45:59 UTC

Transponders
- Band: 34 K_{u} band, 12 C band

Eutelsat 115 West B (previously Satmex 7) is a communications satellite that is operated by Eutelsat, providing video, data, government, and mobile services for the Americas. The satellite was designed and manufactured by Boeing Space Systems, and is a Boeing 702SP model communication satellite. It is located at 115 degrees west longitude. It was launched on board a SpaceX Falcon 9 rocket on 2 March 2015 (UTC time).

The satellite is solely propelled by electrically powered spacecraft propulsion, with the onboard thrusters used for both geostationary orbit insertion and station keeping.

The satellite had a launch mass of 4,861 pounds (2,205 kg). It is notable for being the first commercial communications satellite in orbit to use electric propulsion, providing a significant weight savings. Eutelsat 115 West B was launched with another Boeing 702SP satellite, ABS-3A, on the same rocket.

Eutelsat 115 West B is planned to be the first in a family of four satellites in the Eutelsat constellation. The satellite was scheduled for entry into service in November 2015, but entered service a month earlier than expected, in October 2015.

== Launch ==
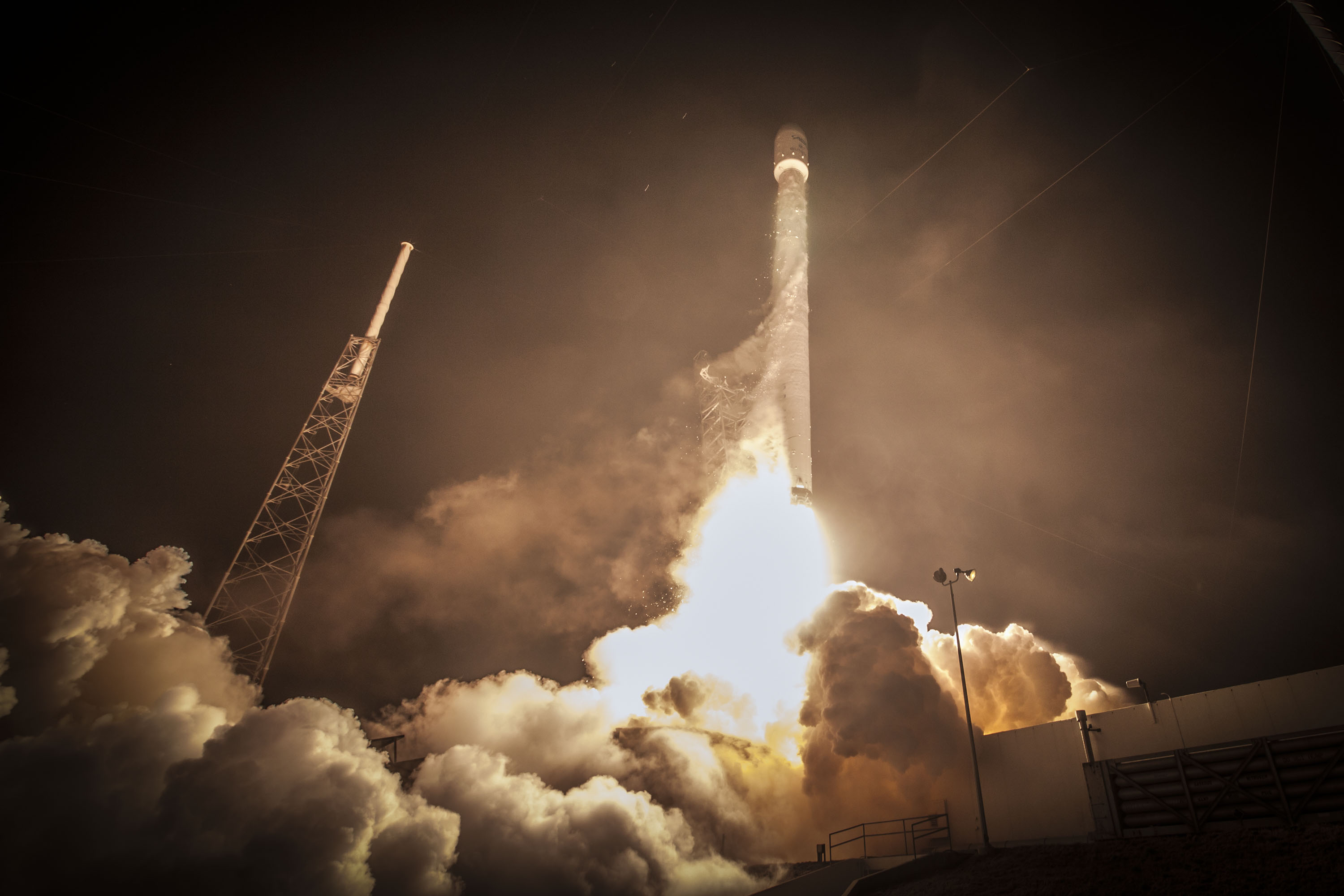
The launch of the Falcon 9 rocket carrying Eutelsat 115 West B.

The launch occurred on March 2, 2015, at 03:50 UTC and the satellite has been deployed in the planned supersynchronous transfer orbit.

The launch is also notable for being the first flight of Boeing's stacked satellite configuration for the Boeing 702SP, a configuration Boeing designed specifically to take advantage of the SpaceX Falcon 9 v1.1 capabilities.

== On-orbit operations ==
The sister-satellite 702SP from the same launch—ABS-3A—became fully operational as a geosynchronous communications satellite by 10 September 2015 after a handover from Boeing to ABS for on-orbit operations on 31 August 2015, approximately one month earlier than planned. A press release on 15 October 2015 stated that Eutelsat 115 West B has started providing service.

== See also ==
- 2015 in spaceflight
- List of Falcon 9 launches
