= Intelsat 36 =

Communications satellite

- Names: IS-36
- Mission type: Communications
- Operator: Intelsat
- COSPAR ID: 2016-053B
- SATCAT no.: 41748
- Website: Intelsat 36
- Mission duration: 15 years (planned)

Spacecraft properties
- Spacecraft: Intelsat 36
- Bus: SSL 1300
- Manufacturer: Space Systems/Loral
- Launch mass: 3,253 kg (7,172 lb)
- Dimensions: 5.2 m × 3.1 m × 3.4 m (17 ft × 10 ft × 11 ft)
- Power: 15.8 kW

Start of mission
- Launch date: 24 August 2016, 22:16:01 UTC
- Rocket: Ariane 5 ECA (VA-232)
- Launch site: Centre Spatial Guyanais, ELA-3
- Contractor: Arianespace
- Entered service: 6 October 2016

Orbital parameters
- Reference system: Geocentric orbit
- Regime: Geostationary orbit
- Longitude: 68.5° East

Transponders
- Band: 40 transponders: 10 C-band; 30 Ku-band
- Coverage area: Sub-Saharan Africa, South Asia

Intelsat 36, also known as IS-36, is a geostationary communications satellite operated by Intelsat and designed and manufactured by Space Systems/Loral on the SSL 1300 satellite bus. It covers Sub-Saharan Africa and South Asia from the 68.5° East longitude, providing media and content distribution with the South Africa MultiChoice company as anchor customer. It has a mixed C-band and Ku-band.

== Satellite description ==
Intelsat 36 was designed and manufactured by Space Systems/Loral on the SSL 1300. It has a launch mass of 3,253 kg (7,172 lb) and a design life of more than 15 years. When stowed for launch, the satellite measures 5.2 m × 3.1 m × 3.4 m (17 ft × 10 ft × 11 ft). It is powered by two wings, with three solar panels each and is designed to generate 15.8 kW at the end of its design life.

Its payload is composed of 10 C-band transponders and 30 Ku-band. The C-band is used for content distribution in the Sub-Saharan Africa and South Asia regions. The Ku-band is used by the anchor customer for Sub-Saharan Africa content distribution.

== History ==
On 4 August 2014, then Space Systems/Loral (now SSL) announced that it had been awarded a contract with Intelsat for a new communications satellite. Continuing with a four decades business relationship, Intelsat 36 would be designed to provide media and content distribution services in Africa and South Asia. Its anchor customer would be MultiChoice of South Africa.

On 15 July 2016, Senior Space Program Managers Richard Laurie and Brian Sing blogged that they had been at the Boeing factory overseeing the transport preparations for Intelsat 33e to French Guiana. There it would join Intelsat 36, for integration on the Ariane 5 ECA launcher, which was expected to launch on 24 August 2016. On 26 July 2016, Space Systems/Loral announced the arrival that same day of Intelsat 36 to the space port in Kourou. At the French launch site, even though Intelsat is the owner of the two passengers of the Ariane 5 VA 232 flight, they have separate launch teams. Each satellite is built by a different manufacturer, and it has a different supervisor team within Intelsat.

On 4 August 2016, Program Manager Brian Sing died and the flight was dedicated in his honor. On 24 August 2016, at 22:16:01 UTC, after a slight delay due to a rocket issue, the Ariane 5 ECA VA-232 flight launched from Centre Spatial Guyanais, ELA-3, with Intelsat 33e riding the upper position and Intelsat 36 enclosed under the SYLDA. At 22:57 UTC, Intelsat 36 separated from the rocket's upper stage. Intelsat confirmed that it had received the satellites signals as expected after separation. Arianespace estimated the insertion orbit as 248.7 km × 35,858 km × 5.98°, very close to the target of 249.0 km × 35,879 km × 6.00°.

Intelsat 36 entered into operation on 6 October 2016.
