= SES-9 =

Geostationary communications satellite

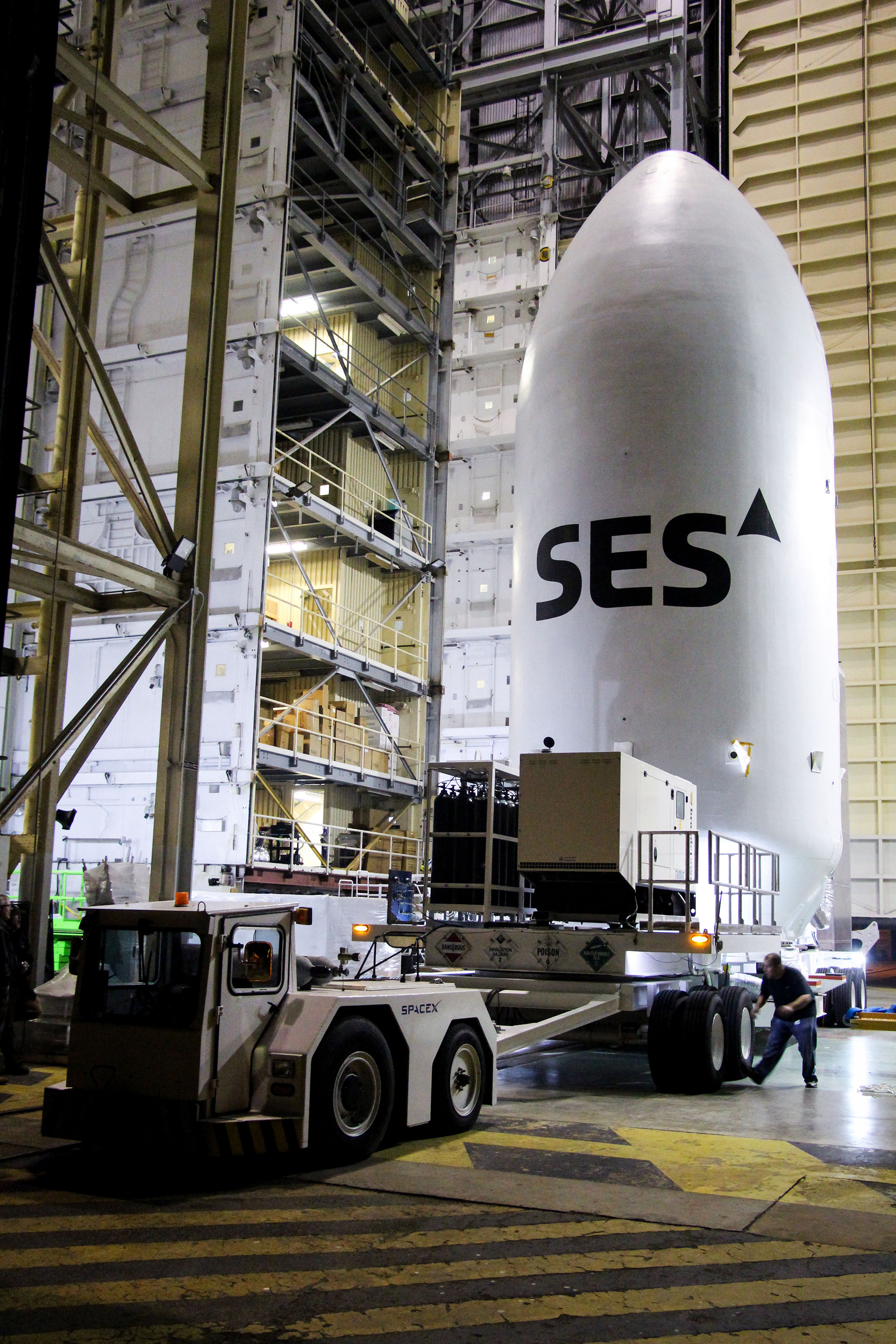
- SES-9 satellite encapsulated in the Falcon 9 payload fairing, but not yet mated with the launch vehicle, 20 February 2016.
- Mission type: Communications
- Operator: SES
- COSPAR ID: 2016-013A
- SATCAT no.: 41380
- Website: https://www.ses.com/
- Mission duration: 15 years (planned); 10 years, 1 month, 24 days (elapsed)

Spacecraft properties
- Spacecraft type: Boeing 702
- Bus: BSS-702HP
- Manufacturer: Boeing
- Launch mass: 5,271 kg (11,621 lb)

Start of mission
- Launch date: 4 March 2016, 23:35 UTC
- Rocket: Falcon 9 Full Thrust
- Launch site: Cape Canaveral, SLC-40
- Contractor: SpaceX

Orbital parameters
- Reference system: Geocentric orbit
- Regime: geostationary orbit
- Longitude: 108.2° East

Transponders
- Band: 33 Ku-band
- Bandwidth: 36 Mhz, 54 MHz
- Coverage area: Northeast Asia, South Asia, Indonesia

SES-9 is a geostationary communications satellite operated by SES It was launched from Cape Canaveral SLC-40 by a Falcon 9 Full Thrust launch vehicle on 4 March 2016.

== Satellite description ==
SES-9 is a large communications satellite operating in geostationary orbit at the 108.2° East, providing communications services to Northeast Asia, South Asia and Indonesia, maritime communications for vessels in the Indian Ocean, and mobility beams for "seamless in-flight connectivity" for domestic Asian airlines of Indonesia and the Philippines.

The satellite was built by Boeing, using a model BSS-702HP satellite bus.

SES-9 had a mass of 5,271 kg (11,621 lb) at launch, the largest Falcon 9 payload yet to a highly-energetic geosynchronous transfer orbit (GTO). SES used the spacecraft's own propulsion capabilities to circularize the trajectory to a geostationary orbit.

== Market and coverage ==
SES-9 has 57 high-power Ku-band transponders, equivalent to 81 transponders of 36 MHz bandwidth and, co-located at 108.2°E alongside SES-7, it provides additional and replacement capacity for DTH broadcasting and data in Northeast Asia, South Asia and Indonesia, and maritime communications for the Indian Ocean. Broadcasts are on six Ku-band coverage beams:

- South Asia beam. Centred on India with a 55 dBW signal (40 cm dish) and taking in Pakistan, Bangladesh, Sri Lanka, Nepal, and parts of Myanmar.
- Northeast Asia beam. Centred on the Philippines with a 55 dBW signal (40 cm dish) and taking in the eastern seaboard of China and parts of Indonesia.
- Southeast Asia beam. Centred on Indonesia with a 54dBW signal (45 cm dish) and taking in Malaysia, Singapore, and parts of Papua New Guinea.
- West Indian Ocean beam. Centred on the Gulf of Oman with a 53 dBW signal (50 cm dish) and taking in the Arabian Peninsula, East Africa, and the western coast of India and Pakistan.
- East Indian Ocean beam. Centred on the Bay of Bengal with a 54 dBW signal (45 cm dish) and taking in southern and eastern India, Sri Lanka, and parts of Bangladesh, Myanmar, Thailand and Malaysia.
- Australia Beam. Centred on Adelaide in Australia with a 55 dBW signal (40 cm dish) and taking in South Australia and parts of Western Australia, Northern Territory (including Alice Springs), New South Wales and Victoria.

== Launch operations ==
=== Contract and scheduling ===
In addition to the earlier SES-8 mission ordered in 2011 and launched in 2013, SES contracted SpaceX for three additional launches starting with SES-9, originally planned for 2015. The deal was announced on 12 September 2012. In early 2015, SES announced that it would be the launch customer of the next rocket evolution by SpaceX: Falcon 9 v1.1 Full Thrust (also called Falcon 9 v1.2, and later, just Falcon 9 Full Thrust). At the time, SES expected SES-9 to be launched by September 2015. Despite the failure of the CRS-7 mission in June 2015, SES re-confirmed in September 2015 their decision to provide the first payload for the new rocket variant; however the launch was postponed until late 2015.

Eventually, after considering all options, SpaceX announced a change on 16 October 2015: Orbcomm's 11 Orbcomm-OG2 satellites would be the payload on the return-to-flight mission of the redesigned rocket instead of SES-9. The Orbcomm payload with its lower orbit would allow SpaceX to test relighting the second-stage engine, a capability required to successfully put the heavier SES-9 on a geostationary orbit. The Orbcomm mission was subsequently delayed to mid-December 2015, while SES-9 was scheduled to follow "within a few weeks". Finally, Falcon 9 Full Thrust performed its maiden launch on 22 December 2015, the final launch of the Falcon 9 v1.1 variant followed in January 2016, with SES-9 moving to February 2016. Consequently, this was the second launch of the Full Thrust variant.

=== Launch attempts ===
A successful static fire test of the rocket was completed on 22 February 2016.

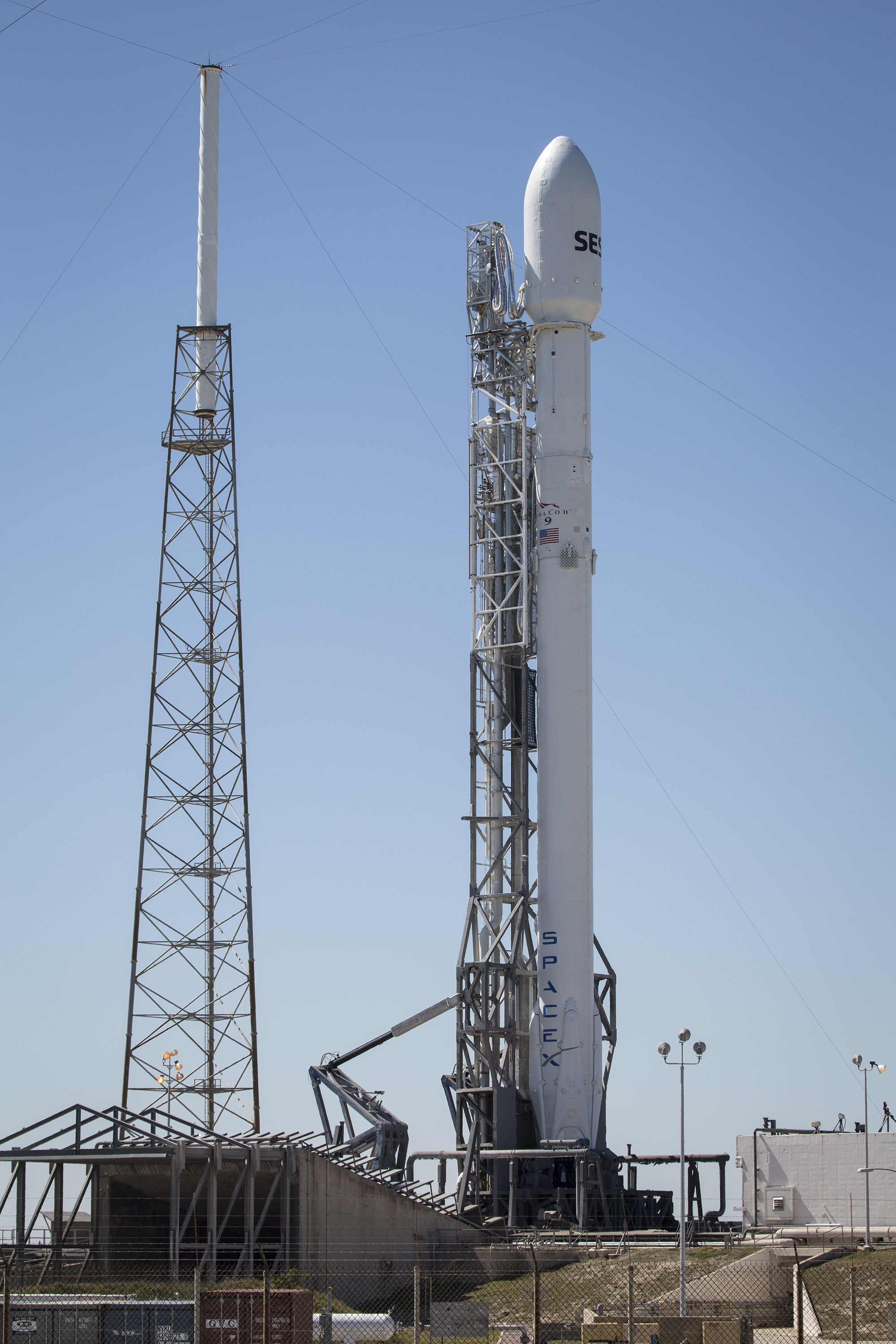
Flight 22 on 24 February 2016 launch attempt, which was scrubbed prior to loading propellants.

Attempt	Planned	Result	Turnaround	Reason	Decision point	Weather go (%)	Notes
1	24 Feb 2016, 11:46:00 pm	Delayed	—	Issue loading cryogenic liquid oxygen		60%	
2	25 Feb 2016, 11:47:00 pm	Aborted	1 day 0 hours 1 minute	Issue loading cryogenic liquid oxygen	(T-00:01:41)	80%	
3	28 Feb 2016, 11:47:00 pm	Aborted	3 days 0 hours 0 minutes	Fouled Range		95%	
4	29 Feb 2016, 12:21:00 am	Aborted	0 days 0 hours 34 minutes	Low thrust alarm due to rising oxygen temps		95%	
5	4 Mar 2016, 11:35:00 pm	Successful launch	4 days 23 hours 14 minutes			90%	Launch window: 23:35 to 01:06 UTC

The launch was initially scheduled for 24 February 2016 at 23:46 UTC, with a backup launch window the next day at the same time. Neither day produced a launch however as both attempts were scrubbed: on 24 February 2016, prior to propellant loading "out of an abundance of caution, in order to get the rocket's liquid oxygen propellant as cold as possible"; and on 25 February 2016, just two minutes prior to launch "citing a last-minute problem with propellant loading".

Subsequently, the launch was rescheduled for the evening of 28 February 2016 at 23:47 UTC, with a fallback slot same time next day. On 28 February 2016, launch attempt was aborted less than two minutes before scheduled liftoff due to a tugboat entering the area of the offshore safety zone. A second attempt on 28 February 2016 was made about 35 minutes later, after the downrange zone had been cleared, however, the rocket shut-down a moment after ignition due to low thrust flag from one engine. Rising oxygen temperature due to the hold for the tugboat to clear and a suspected helium bubble, the two are related: the helium bubble in the warmer LOX was affected by the earlier launch attempt, when the stage was pressurized (with helium) for some time, increasing the saturation of helium gas into the liquid oxygen, which could then bubble out when the turbopumps began rapidly drawing oxidizer from the tank for the launch (and lowering tank pressure in the zone around the turbopump inlet), were suggested by Elon Musk as the likely reasons for the alarm being triggered. The next launch attempt on 1 March 2016 was postponed to 4 March 2016 due to high winds.

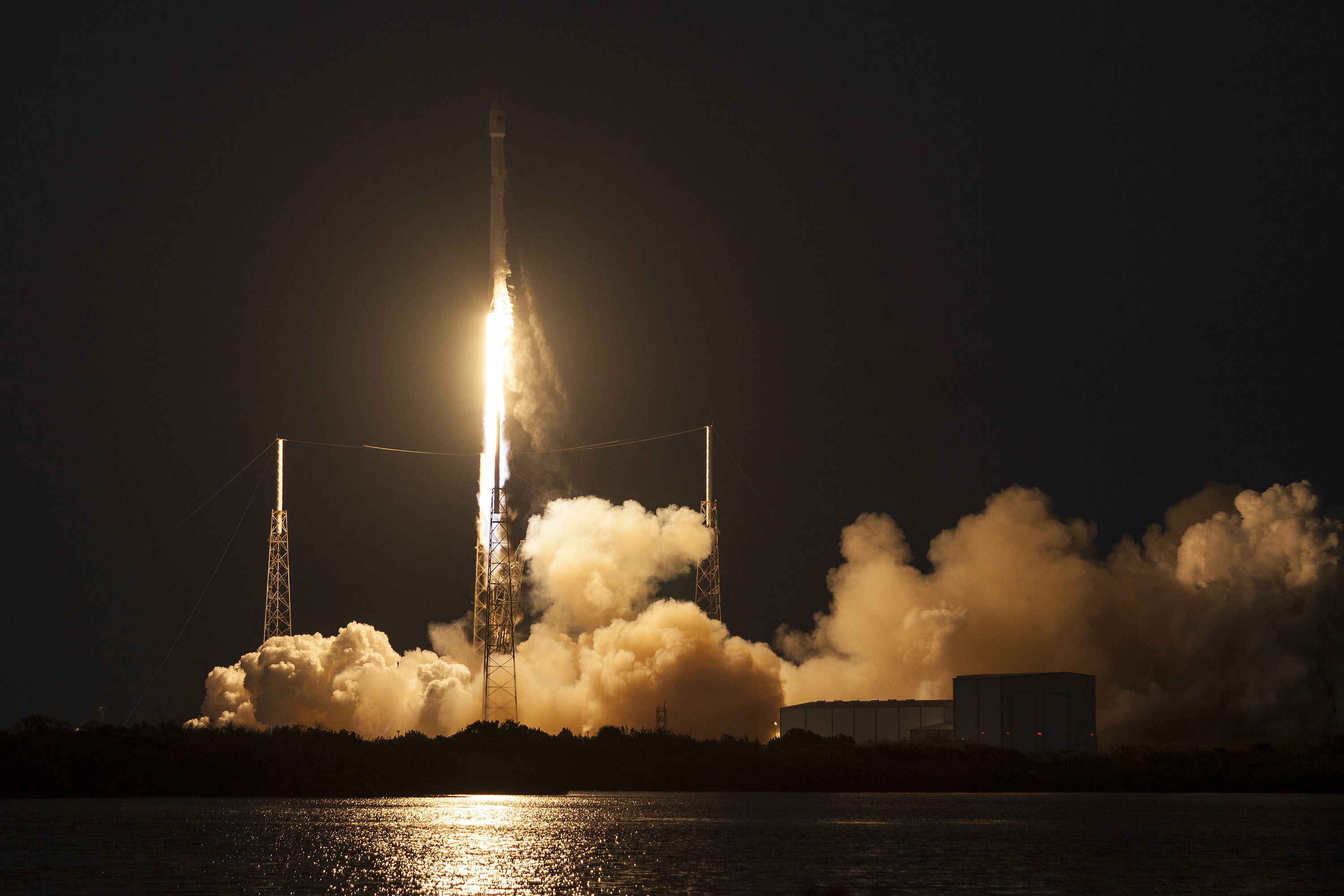
Falcon 9 Flight 22 launching on 4 March 2016, carrying SES-9.

The launch was finally attempted, and succeeded, on 4 March 2016 at 23:35:00 UTC.

=== Orbit adjustment ===
The original apogee for the transfer orbit contracted by SpaceX was 26,000 km (16,000 mi), a subsynchronous highly-elliptical orbit that SES would then circularize and raise over several months before the satellite would be ready for operational service at 36,000 km (22,000 mi). SES CTO Martin Halliwell indicated in February 2016 that SpaceX had agreed to add additional energy to the spacecraft with the launch vehicle and that a new apogee of approximately 39,000 km (24,000 mi) was the objective, in order to assist SES in the satellite becoming operational many weeks earlier than otherwise possible,

=== Post-mission landing test ===
External videos
- SES-9 Technical Webcast: Experimental Landing

Following word from SES that SpaceX had allocated some of the normal propellant reserve margins for landing to placing the SES-9 satellite in a higher (and more energetic) orbit than originally planned,

SpaceX confirmed in February 2016 that they would still attempt a secondary goal of executing a controlled-descent and vertical landing flight test of the first stage on the SpaceX east-coast Autonomous spaceport drone ship (floating landing platform) named Of Course I Still Love You. Although SpaceX successfully recovered a first booster on land following the December launch to a less-energetic orbital trajectory, they had not yet succeeded in booster recovery from any of the previous attempts to land on a floating platform. Because the SES-9 satellite was very heavy and was going to such a high orbit, SpaceX indicated prior to launch that they did not expect this landing to succeed.

As expected, booster recovery failed: the spent first stage "landed hard", damaging the drone ship, but the controlled-descent and atmospheric re-entry, as well as navigation to a point in the Atlantic Ocean over 600 km (370 mi) away from the launch site, were successful and returned significant test data on bringing back a high-energy Falcon 9.

The controlled descent through the atmosphere and landing attempt for each booster is an arrangement that is not used on other orbital launch vehicles. SES CTO Martin Halliwell had informed SpaceX that they were willing to use the same rocket twice to power another satellite to orbit. This idea became reality in March 2017 with the SES-10 mission flying with the reused booster from CRS-8.

By 21 March 2016, the hole in the deck of the drone ship had been nearly repaired.

== See also ==
- SES
- List of Falcon 9 launches
