= Intelsat 1R =

Geostationary communications satellite

- Names: IS-1R; PAS-1R
- Mission type: Communications
- Operator: PanAmSat (2000–2006); Intelsat (2006–2016)
- COSPAR ID: 2000-072A
- SATCAT no.: 26608
- Mission duration: 15 years (planned)

Spacecraft properties
- Spacecraft: PAS-1R
- Spacecraft type: Boeing 702
- Bus: BSS-702
- Manufacturer: Boeing
- Launch mass: 4,792 kg (10,565 lb)
- Dry mass: 3,000 kg (6,600 lb)
- Power: 14 kW

Start of mission
- Launch date: 16 November 2000, 01:07:07 UTC
- Rocket: Ariane 5G (V135)
- Launch site: Centre Spatial Guyanais, ELA-3
- Contractor: Arianespace
- Entered service: January 2001

Orbital parameters
- Reference system: Geocentric orbit
- Regime: Geostationary orbit
- Longitude: 45° West (2000–2010); 50° West (2010-2016); 203° West (2016-present)

Transponders
- Band: 72 transponders: 36 C-band; 36 Ku-band
- Coverage area: Americas, Caribbean, Europe, Africa

Intelsat 1R (formerly PAS-1R) is a communications satellite owned by Intelsat located at 50° West of longitude, serving Americas, the Caribbean, Europe and Africa. The satellite was replaced by Intelsat 14 at 45° West in 2010 and moved to 50° West, where it was finally replaced by Intelsat 29e.
