= ABS (satellite operator) =

Dubai-based operator of communication satellites

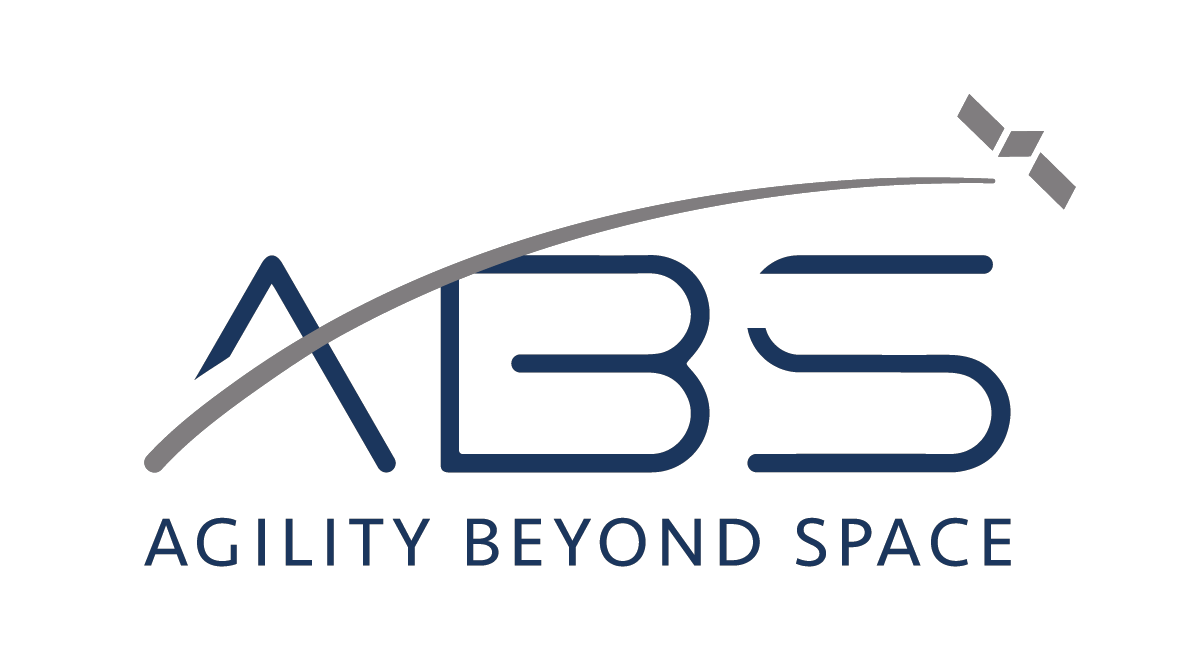
- Company type: Private
- Industry: Satellite communication
- Founded: 2006; 20 years ago
- Key people: Mark Rigolle (CEO)
- Website: www.absatellite.com

ABS - Agility Beyond Space is a global satellite operator headquartered in Dubai, UAE and has offices in United States and Asia. The company redomiciled to the Dubai under its new legal entity name, Agility Beyond Space FZ-LLC, in 2025. ABS operates a fleet of five communication satellites, providing coverage to approximately 93% of the world's population including the Americas, Africa, Asia Pacific, Europe, the Middle East and Northern Asia. ABS provides satellite service for data, broadcast and internet connectivity, with a strong focus on secure government communications, enterprise networks, and essential community infrastructure.

Financial Report - FY 24-25

== History ==
ABS was established in 2006; and launched its first satellite ABS-1, originally known as Lockheed Martin Intersputnik-1 (LMI-1).

Its fleet subsequently expanded to ABS-2A, ABS-3A, ABS-4 and ABS-6, enabling extensive global coverage and service diversity. In 2023, the company rebranded as ABS - Agility Beyond Space, marking its evolution into a modern, agile satellite operator focused on innovation and global connectivity.

== Services ==
Broadcast Services	Data Services	Government	ABSPlus
Broadcasting	GSM Backhaul	Government and Military	ABSPlus Teleport
Occasional Use (OU)	Broadband Internet and IP Trunking		ABSPlus Video
Direct to Home (DTH)	VSAT Networks		ABSPlus Install
Cable Distribution	VNO		ABSPlus SatOps
Video Contribution	Mobility - Maritime Connectivity		ABSPlus Consult
High Definition (HDTV)			ABSPlus H2H

== Satellites ==
Satellite	Bus	Location	Regions served	Launched
ABS-2	Loral FS 1300	75°E	Africa, Asia Pacific, Europe, the Middle East, Northern Asia	2014/2/6
ABS-2A	Boeing 702SP	75°E	South Asia, Southeast Asia, Northern Asia, Sub-Saharan Africa, GCC	2016/6/15
ABS-3A	Boeing 702SP	3°W	Americas, Africa, Europe, the Middle East	2015/3/2
ABS-4	Loral FS 1300	61°E	GCC and Northern Africa	2004/3/13
ABS-6	LM A2100	159°E	Pacific Ocean and Eastern Asia	1999/9/26
