= ABS-3A =

All-electric geostationary communications satellite

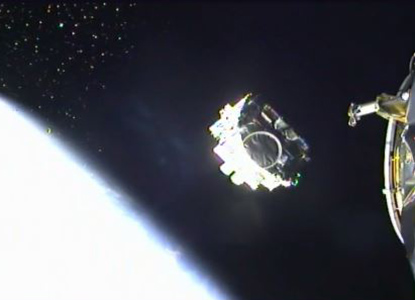
- Mission type: Communications
- Operator: ABS
- COSPAR ID: 2015-010A
- SATCAT no.: 40424
- Mission duration: 15 years (planned)

Spacecraft properties
- Bus: Boeing 702SP
- Manufacturer: Boeing
- Launch mass: 4,354 pounds (1,975 kg)
- Dry mass: 3,759 pounds (1,705 kg)
- Power: >10.9kW at 15 years

Start of mission
- Launch date: March 2, 2015, 03:50 UTC
- Rocket: Falcon 9 v1.1
- Launch site: Cape Canaveral SLC-40
- Contractor: SpaceX

Orbital parameters
- Reference system: Geocentric
- Regime: Geostationary
- Longitude: 3° West

Transponders
- Band: 24 K_{u} band, 24 C band
- Frequency: 13.750-14.750 / 10.700-11.200, 11.450-11.700, 12.500-12.750 (Ku band), 5.850-6.425/3.625-4.200 (C band)
- Bandwidth: 72 MHz (Ku band, C band)
- TWTA power: 150 watts (Ku band),70 watts (C band)

ABS-3A is a communications satellite operated by ABS (formerly known as Asia Broadcast Satellite), providing coverage in the Americas, Europe, the Middle East, and Africa. It is positioned in geostationary orbit at 3° West, and offers C and Ku-band payload capacity to support video, data, mobility and government applications. The satellite is the first commercial communications satellite in orbit to use electric propulsion, providing a significant weight savings.

== Manufacture and specifications ==
The satellite was designed and manufactured by Boeing, and is a Boeing 702SP model communication satellite. It will be located at 3 degrees West longitude. It was launched on board a SpaceX Falcon 9 rocket on 2 March 2015 (UTC time).

The satellite is propelled solely by electrically powered spacecraft propulsion, with the on-board thrusters used for both geostationary orbit insertion and station keeping.

The satellite is based on the Boeing 702 satellite bus, and was launched along with Eutelsat 115 West B, which is based on the same bus. The satellite had a launch mass of 4,354 pounds (1,975 kg).

The satellite utilizes three C-band beams and four Ku-band beams. The C-band beams cover the Americas, Europe, the Middle East, and Africa. Additionally, the C-band can be used globally. The Ku-band beams extend across Europe, the Middle East, North Africa, and South Africa, as well as providing further coverage of the Americas.

== Launch ==
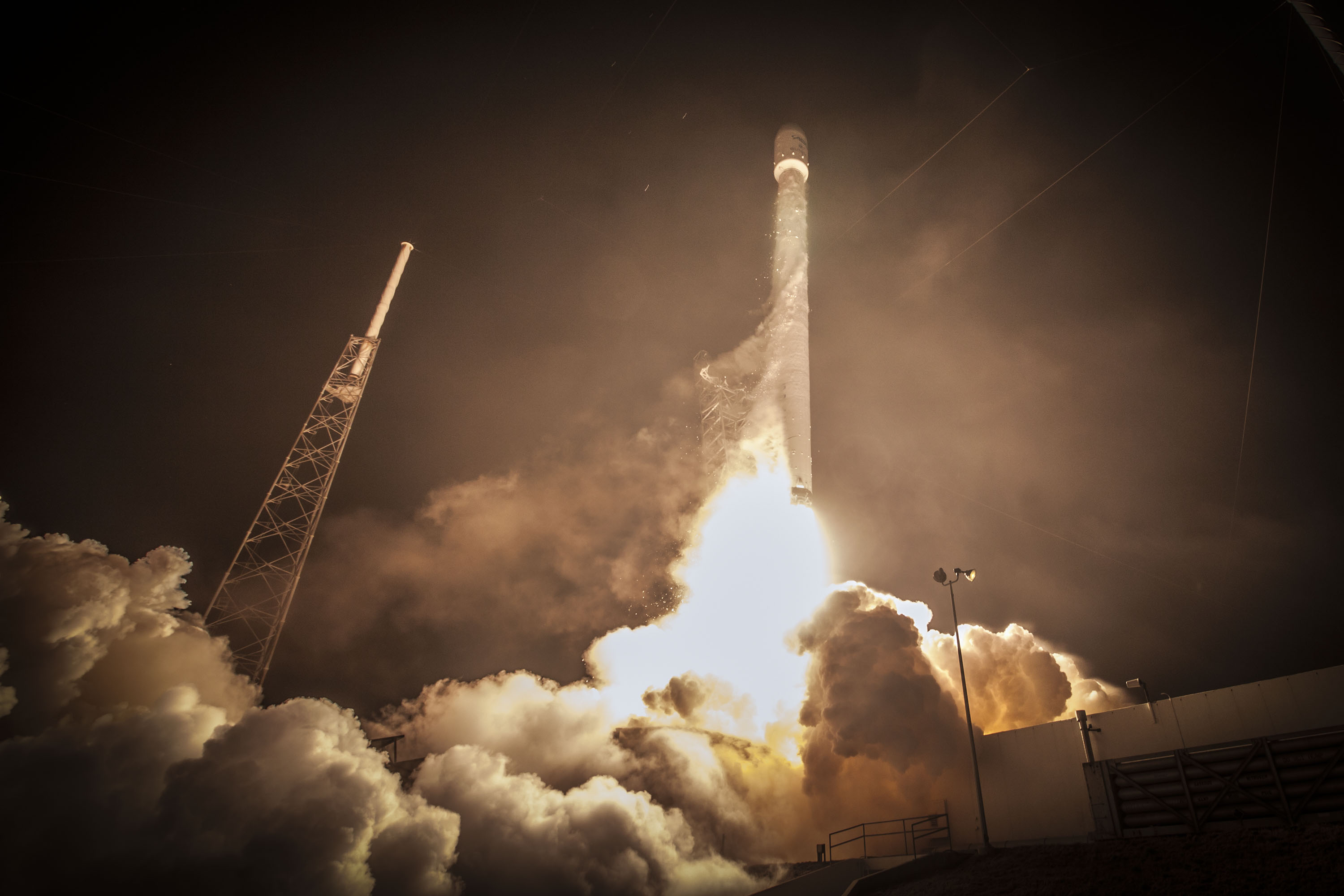
The launch of the Falcon 9 rocket carrying ABS-3A.

The launch occurred on March 2, 2015 at 03:50 UTC and the satellite has been deployed in the planned supersynchronous transfer orbit.

The launch is also notable for being the first flight of Boeing's stacked satellite configuration for the Boeing 702SP, a configuration Boeing designed specifically to take advantage of the SpaceX Falcon 9 v1.1 capabilities.

== On-orbit operations ==
The satellite became fully operational as a geosynchronous communications satellite by 10 September 2015 after a handover from Boeing to ABS for on-orbit operations on 31 August 2015, approximately one month earlier than planned.

== See also ==
- List of Falcon 9 launches
