= GiSAT-1 =

Cancelled communications satellite

- Mission type: Communications
- Operator: Global IP Cayman
- Mission duration: 15 years (planned)

Spacecraft properties
- Spacecraft: GiSAT-1
- Spacecraft type: Boeing 702
- Bus: Boeing 702MP
- Manufacturer: Boeing
- Launch mass: 6,000 kg (13,000 lb)
- Power: 15 kW

Start of mission
- Launch date: Cancelled
- Rocket: Falcon 9 Block 5
- Launch site: Cape Canaveral
- Contractor: SpaceX

Orbital parameters
- Reference system: Geocentric orbit
- Regime: Geostationary orbit

Transponders
- Band: Ka-band
- Bandwidth: >150 Gbit/s
- Coverage area: 35 Sub-Saharan Africa countries. Europe

GiSAT-1 is a high-throughput geostationary communications satellite project by Global IP Cayman. It was to be designed and manufactured by Boeing Satellite Development Center on the Boeing-702MP satellite bus. It is intended to serve 35 Sub-Saharan Africa countries on the Ka-band and offer over 150 Gbit/s of bandwidth with a flexible digital payload. It was expected to be launched in the fourth quarter of 2018, but the cancellation of the construction contract by Boeing in December 2018 left the launch of the satellite uncertain.

== Satellite description ==
GiSAT-1 was being designed and manufactured by Boeing Satellite Development Center on the Boeing 702MP satellite bus. It was estimated to have a launch mass of 6,000 kg (13,000 lb) and a design life of more than 15 years.

It was to be powered by two wings, with four solar panels each, of triple-junction GsAs solar cells providing a total of 15 kW. It was to have a fully digital high-throughput Ka-band payload offering over 150 Gbit/s of bandwidth. It should offer its services in all the African continent and have four gateways in Europe for connectivity.

== History ==
On 12 September 2016, Boeing Satellite Development Center announced another win for its Boeing 702MP platform, with the order of GiSAT-1 from the start-up Global IP Cayman. It would be a 6,000 kg (13,000 lb) satellite with 15 kW of power generation with a fully digital high-throughput Ka-band payload offering over 150 Gbit/s of bandwidth. It was at the time expected to be launched in 2019. On 3 April 2017, Global IP Cayman announced that it had signed an agreement with SpaceX to launch GiSAT-1 on a Falcon 9 launch vehicle. On 6 December 2018, Boeing announced that it was cancelling the contract, citing lack of payment. According to the Wall Street Journal, Boeing intends to resell the nearly complete satellite to another customer.

In October 2019, Global IP announced that it was seeking to renegotiate the contract with Boeing with the backing of a US$175 million investment from Bronzelink Holdings. The money would go towards completion of the mostly-complete satellite and fulfillment of contract payments. Because the launch order with SpaceX remains valid, GiSAT-1 will still be launched on a Falcon 9 rocket; the satellite's telemetry, tracking, and control will be managed by Hellas Sat.
