= Nusantara Lima =

Indonesian telecommunications satellite

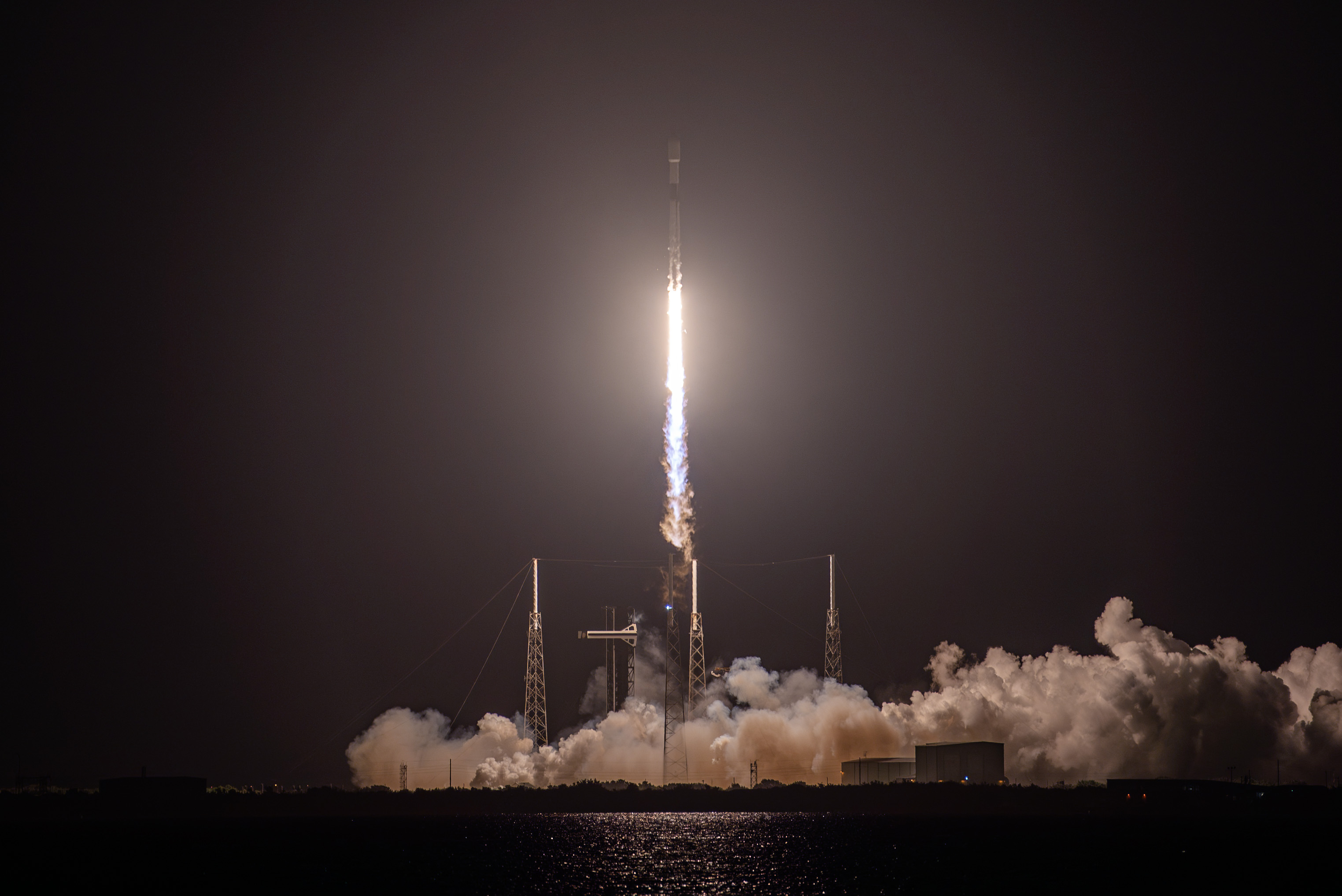
- Nusantara Lima during launch
- Mission type: Communication
- Operator: PT Pasifik Satelit Nusantara
- COSPAR ID: 2025-205A
- SATCAT no.: 65588
- Mission duration: 15 years (planned)

Spacecraft properties
- Spacecraft type: BSS 702MP
- Bus: Boeing 702
- Manufacturer: Boeing
- Launch mass: 7,800 kg

Start of mission
- Launch date: 12 September 2025, 00:56 UTC
- Rocket: Falcon 9 Block 5
- Launch site: Cape Canaveral, SLC-40
- Contractor: SpaceX

Orbital parameters
- Reference system: Geocentric orbit
- Regime: Geostationary orbit

Nusantara Lima (also known as Nusantara-5) is a geostationary high-throughput satellite (HTS) owned and operated by Indonesian satellite operator PT Pasifik Satelit Nusantara. Built by Boeing on the BSS 702MP platform, it provides broadband Indonesia and some ASEAN countries. Launched in 2024, it expands upon the capabilities of the SATRIA-1 satellite.

== Launch ==
In 2022, PT Pasifik Satelit Nusantara ordered the Nusantara Lima satellite from Boeing. It was planned for a launch in 2023. After delays launch preparation began when Boeing delivered the satellite to Cape Canaveral.

Nusantara Lima launched on 12 September 2025 aboard a SpaceX Falcon 9 Block 5 rocket from SLC-40 at Cape Canaveral Space Force Station. First-stage booster B1078 landed successfully on a droneship. The satellite is the second-heaviest commercial geostationary satellite after Jupiter 3 (EchoStar-24) and is the heaviest satellite launch by Falcon 9 to GTO.
