= ABS-2 =

Communications satellite

ABS-2 is a Space Systems/Loral FS 1300 satellite launched in February 2014. It is positioned in geostationary orbit at 75° East and serves four continents across Asia Pacific, Europe, the Middle East, Africa, Russia and CIS countries. The satellite provides fixed satellite services (FSS) including, video, data and telecommunication networks, corporate networks, cellular backhaul, IP trunking, mobility, and government and military services. It is owned and operated by ABS at its Subic Bay facility.

== Spacecraft ==
ABS-2 is built on SSL 1300 satellite bus and equipped with up to 32 C-band, 51 Ku-band and 6 Ka-band transponders. Total mass at lift off was 6,330 kilograms (13,960 lb), with the size of 8.3 by 3.5 by 3.5 metres (27 ft × 11 ft × 11 ft) and 26 metres (85 ft) span when in orbit.

On 17 June 2009, ABS announced that ABS-2 will be built by Space Systems/Loral, with a launch initially planned for 2012. Due to financial delays, the contract did not get signed until 14 October 2010, delaying the launch to 2013.

== Launch ==
The satellite was scheduled to launch on 23 January 2014, however the need to change an unspecified equipment in the launcher delayed it further. Eventually Ariane 5 ECA flight VA 217 successfully launched on 6 February 2014 at 21:30 UTC taking Athena-Fidus in the lower slot and ABS-2 in the upper.
