= Intelsat 27 =

American communications satellite

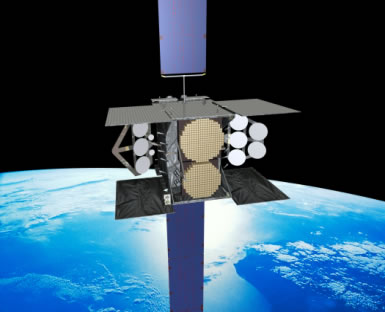
- Intelsat 27, built on the basis of the Boeing 702.
- Mission type: Communications
- Operator: Intelsat
- Mission duration: 15 years (planned); 40 seconds (achieved); Failed to orbit

Spacecraft properties
- Bus: BSS-702MP
- Manufacturer: Boeing
- Launch mass: 6,241 kg (13,759 lb)

Start of mission
- Launch date: 1 February 2013, 06:56 UTC
- Rocket: Zenit-3SL
- Launch site: Odyssey, Pacific Ocean
- Contractor: Sea Launch

Orbital parameters
- Reference system: Geocentric
- Regime: Geostationary
- Longitude: 55.5° West
- Epoch: Planned

Intelsat 27 was an American communications satellite which was to have been operated by Intelsat. Intended as a replacement for Intelsat 805, it was destroyed after the rocket carrying it to orbit fell into the Pacific Ocean 56 seconds after launch.

== Design ==
Based on the Boeing 702MP satellite bus, Intelsat 27 was designed to provide fifteen or more years of service to Intelsat customers in North America, South America, the Atlantic Ocean region and Europe. The spacecraft had a mass of 6,241 kilograms (13,759 lb), and was equipped with 20 C band and 20 K_{u} band transponders for commercial users, as well as 20 UHF transponders for military use. Originally intended for the United States Navy, the UHF payload was to have been leased to the government of Italy following the US Department of Defense withdrawing. The satellite would have been positioned at 55.5° West in geostationary orbit, co-located with Intelsat 805 and Galaxy 11.

== Launch ==
Sea Launch were contracted to launch Intelsat 27, using a Zenit-3SL carrier rocket flying from the Odyssey platform anchored in the Pacific Ocean. The rocket lifted off from Odyssey at 06:56 UTC on February 1, 2013, however shortly afterwards Sea Launch issued a statement that the launch failed "approximately 40 seconds after liftoff", during first stage flight. Initial indications are that the rocket's first stage engine was intentionally shut down after the vehicle went out of control. Intelsat stated that they were "clearly disappointed with the outcome of the launch".

Sea Launch's Failure Review Oversight Board (FROB) found that the problem was in the hydraulic power supply unit in the Zenit-3SL's first stage.

== See also ==
- 2013 in spaceflight
- Intelsat 708
- NSS-8
