= Intelsat 805 =

Communications satellite

Coordinates: 0°N 168.97°W

- Mission type: Communications
- Operator: Intelsat
- COSPAR ID: 1998-037A
- SATCAT no.: 25371
- Mission duration: 14 years (planned)

Spacecraft properties
- Spacecraft type: AS-7000
- Manufacturer: Lockheed Martin
- Launch mass: 3,524 kilograms (7,769 lb)

Start of mission
- Launch date: June 18, 1998, 22:48 UTC
- Rocket: Atlas IIAS AC-153
- Launch site: Cape Canaveral SLC-36A

Orbital parameters
- Reference system: Geocentric
- Regime: Geostationary; Now supersynchronous
- Semi-major axis: 42,164 kilometres (26,199 mi)
- Perigee altitude: 35,778.0 kilometres (22,231.4 mi)
- Apogee altitude: 35,809.0 kilometres (22,250.7 mi)
- Inclination: 0°
- Period: 1,436.1 minutes
- Epoch: May 6, 2017

Transponders
- Band: 28 C Band, 3 K_{u} band
- Coverage area: Americas, Europe

Intelsat 805 is a communications satellite operated by Intelsat. Launched in 1998, it was operated in geostationary orbit at a longitude of 55.5 degrees west for around 14 years.

== Launch ==
The launch of Intelsat 805 made use of an Atlas II rocket flying from Cape Canaveral Air Force Station, Florida, United States. The launch took place at 22:48 UTC on June 18, 1998, with the spacecraft entering a geosynchronous transfer orbit. Intelsat 805 subsequently fired its apogee motor to achieve geostationary orbit.

== Technical details ==
C-Band slot chart
Slot	Uplink (GHz)	Downlink (GHz)	Hemi A	Hemi B	Bandwidth (MHz)
7'	6.467	3.442	13'A	23'A	36
6'	6.507	3.442	12'B	22'B	36
5'	6.547	3.482	12'A	22'A	36
4'	6.587	3.562	11'B	21'B	36
3'	6.627	3.602	11'A	21'A	36
'1	5.908	3.683	10'A	20'A	36
1-2	5.970	3.745	11	21	72
3-4	6.050	3.825	12	22	72
5-6	6.130	3.905	13	23	72
7-8	6.220	3.995	14	24	72
9	6.280	4.055	15	25	36
10	6.320	4.095	16	26	36
11	6.360	4.135	17	27	36
12	6.4025	4.1775	18	28	41

Ku-band slot chart
Slot	Uplink (GHz) Polariztion H	Downlink (GHz) Polarization V	Spot 1	Bandwidth (MHz)
1-2	14.0425	12.5475	361	77
3-4	14.125	12.630	362	72
5-6	14.205	12.701	363	72
