= Falcon 9 v1.1 =

Second version of the SpaceX medium-lift launch vehicle

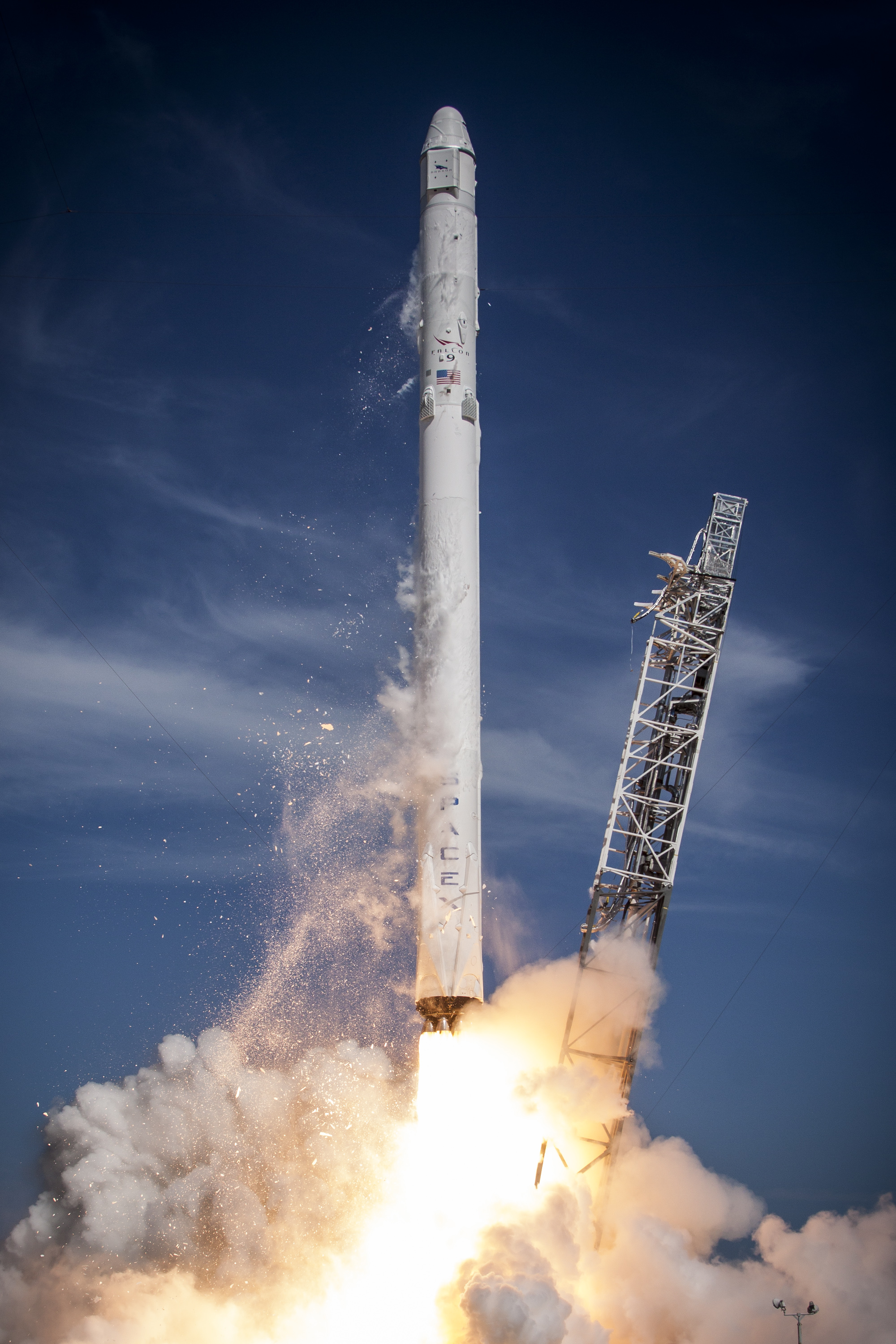
- Launch of the 9th Falcon 9 v1.1 with the SpaceX CRS-5 on 10 January 2015. This rocket was equipped with landing legs and grid fins.
- Function: Medium-lift launch vehicle
- Manufacturer: SpaceX
- Country of origin: United States
- Cost per launch: $56.5M (2013) – 61.2M (2015)

Size
- Height: 68.4 m (224 ft) with payload fairing 63.4 m (208 ft) with Dragon
- Diameter: 3.7 m (12 ft)
- Mass: 505,846 kg (1,115,200 lb)
- Stages: 2

Capacity

Payload to LEO (28.5°)
- Mass: 13,150 kg (28,990 lb); 10,886 kg (24,000 lb) (PAF structural limitation)

Payload to GTO (27°)
- Mass: 4,850 kg (10,690 lb)

Associated rockets
- Family: Falcon 9
- Based on: Falcon 9 v1.0
- Derivative work: Falcon 9 Full Thrust
- Comparable: Atlas V; H-IIA; Long March 3B

Launch history
- Status: Retired
- Launch sites: Cape Canaveral SLC-40; Vandenberg SLC-4E
- Total launches: 15
- Success(es): 14
- Failure: 1
- Partial failure: 0
- Landings: 0 / 3 attempts
- First flight: 29 September 2013
- Last flight: 17 January 2016
- Carries passengers or cargo: CASSIOPE, SES-8, Thaicom 6, Dragon, Orbcomm OG2, AsiaSat 8, AsiaSat 6, DSCOVR, ABS-3A, Eutelsat 115 West B, TürkmenÄlem 52°E / MonacoSAT, Jason-3

First stage
- Height: 41.2 m (135 ft)
- Diameter: 3.7 m (12 ft)
- Powered by: 9x Merlin 1D
- Maximum thrust: Sea level: 5,885 kN (1,323,000 lb_{f}); Vacuum: 6,672 kN (1,500,000 lb_{f})
- Specific impulse: Sea level: 282 seconds Vacuum: 311 seconds
- Burn time: 180 seconds
- Propellant: LOX / RP-1

Second stage
- Height: 13.6 m (45 ft)
- Diameter: 3.7 m (12 ft)
- Powered by: 1x Merlin 1D Vacuum
- Maximum thrust: 716 kN (161,000 lb_{f})
- Specific impulse: 340 seconds
- Burn time: 375 seconds
- Propellant: LOX / RP-1

Falcon 9 v1.1 was the second version of SpaceX's Falcon 9 orbital launch vehicle. The rocket was developed in 2011–2013, made its maiden launch in September 2013, and its final flight in January 2016. The Falcon 9 rocket was fully designed, manufactured, and operated by SpaceX. Following the second Commercial Resupply Services (CRS) launch, the initial version Falcon 9 v1.0 was retired from use and replaced by the v1.1 version.

Falcon 9 v1.1 was a significant evolution from Falcon 9 v1.0, with 60 percent more thrust and weight. Its maiden flight carried out a demonstration mission with the CASSIOPE satellite on 29 September 2013, the sixth overall launch of any Falcon 9.

Both stages of the two-stage-to-orbit vehicle used liquid oxygen (LOX) and rocket-grade kerosene (RP-1) propellants. The Falcon 9 v1.1 could lift payloads of 13,150 kilograms (28,990 lb) to low Earth orbit, and 4,850 kilograms (10,690 lb) to geostationary transfer orbit, which places the Falcon 9 design in the medium-lift range of launch systems.

Beginning in April 2014, the Dragon capsules were propelled by Falcon 9 v1.1 to deliver cargo to the International Space Station under the Commercial Resupply Services contract with NASA. This version was also intended to ferry astronauts to the ISS under a NASA Commercial Crew Development contract signed in September 2014. However, SpaceX ended up using the upgraded Falcon 9 Block 5 version instead for all Crew Dragon missions.

Falcon 9 v1.1 was notable for pioneering the development of reusable rockets, whereby SpaceX gradually refined technologies for first-stage boostback, atmospheric re-entry, controlled descent and eventual propulsive landing. This last goal was achieved on the first flight of the successor variant Falcon 9 Full Thrust, after several near-successes with Falcon 9 v1.1.

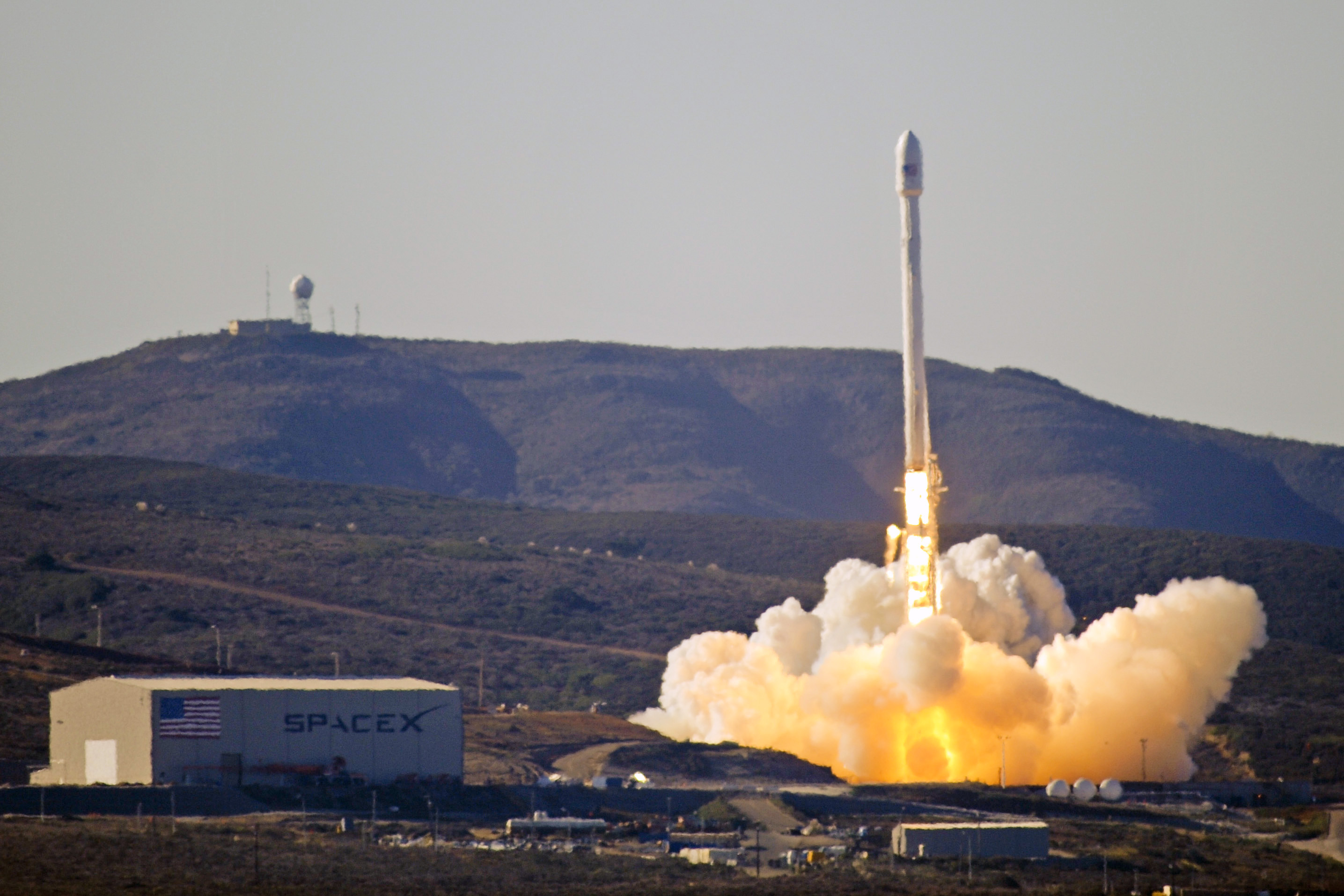
The launch of the first Falcon 9 v1.1 from SLC-4, Vandenberg AFB (Falcon 9 Flight 6) 29 September 2013

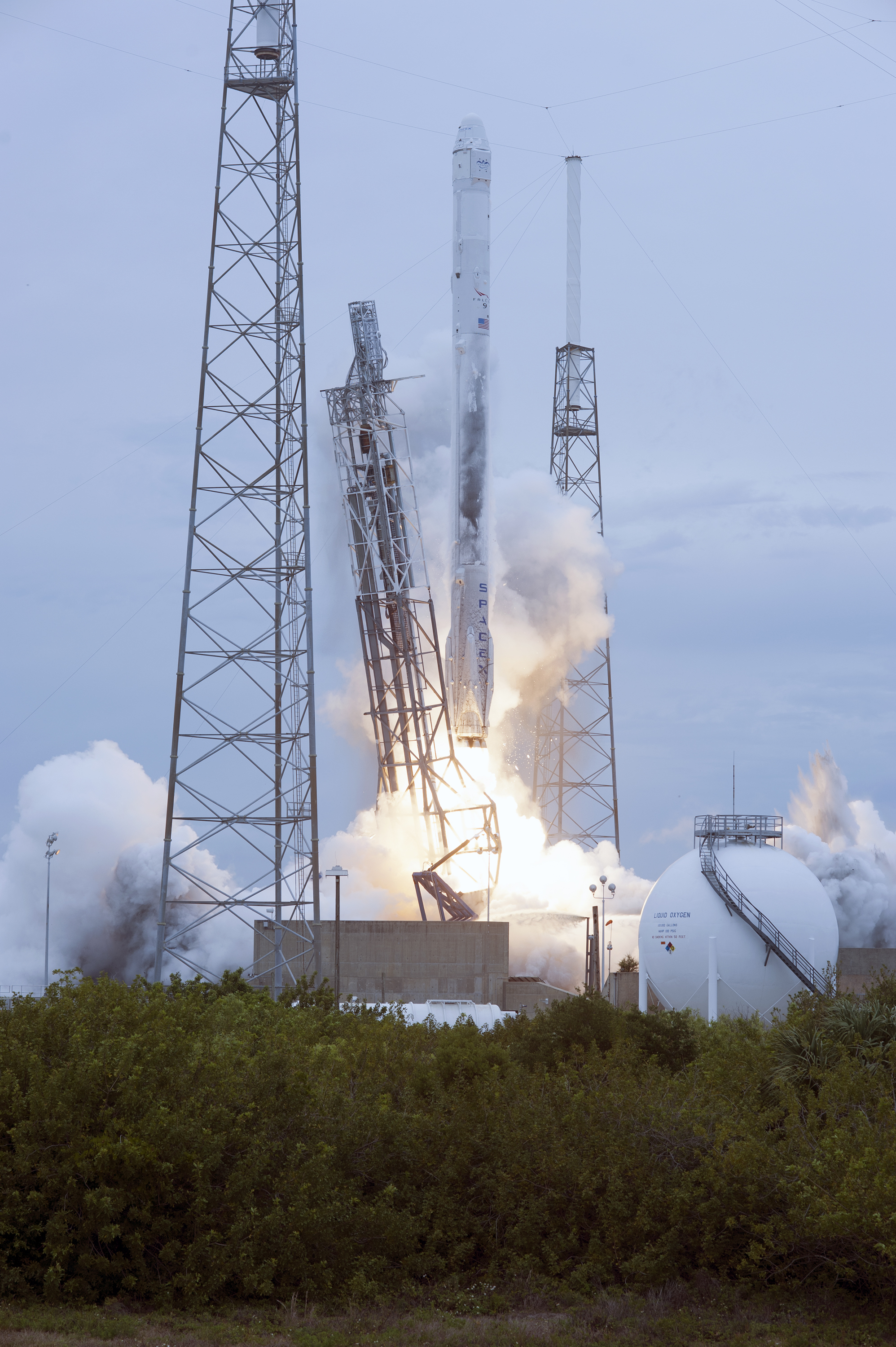
A Falcon 9 v1.1 rocket launching the SpaceX CRS-3 Dragon spacecraft in April 2014

== Design ==
The Falcon 9 v1.1 is a two-stage, LOX/RP-1–powered launch vehicle.

=== Modifications from Falcon 9 v1.0 ===
The original Falcon 9 flew five successful orbital launches in 2010–2013, all carrying the Dragon spacecraft or a test version of the spacecraft.

The Falcon 9 v1.1 ELV was a 60 percent heavier rocket with 60 percent more thrust than the v1.0 version of the Falcon 9. It includes realigned first-stage engines and 60 percent longer fuel tanks, making it more susceptible to bending during flight. The engines were upgraded from the Merlin 1C to the more powerful Merlin 1D engines. These improvements increased the payload capability to LEO from 10,454 kilograms (23,047 lb) to 13,150 kilograms (28,990 lb). The stage separation system was redesigned and reduced the number of attachment points from twelve to three, and the vehicle had upgraded avionics and software as well.

The v1.1 booster version arranged the engines in a structural form SpaceX called Octaweb, with eight engines arranged in a circular pattern around a single center engine. The v1.0 used a rectangular pattern of engines. The Octaweb pattern was aimed at streamlining the manufacturing process. Later v1.1 vehicles include four extensible landing legs, used in the controlled-descent test program.

Following the first launch of the Falcon 9 v1.1 in September 2013, which experienced a post-mission second-stage engine restart failure, the second-stage igniter propellant lines were insulated to better support in-space restart following long coast phases for orbital trajectory maneuvers. Falcon 9 Flight 6 was the first launch of the Falcon 9 configured with a jettisonable payload fairing.

=== First stage ===
Falcon 9 v1.0 (left) and v1.1 (right) engine configurations

The Falcon 9 v1.1 uses a first stage powered by nine Merlin 1D engines. Development testing of the v1.1 Falcon 9 first stage was completed in July 2013.

The v1.1 first stage has a total sea-level thrust at liftoff of 5,885 kN (1,323,000 pounds-force), with the nine engines burning for a nominal 180 seconds, while stage thrust rises to 6,672 kN (1,500,000 pounds-force) as the booster climbs out of the atmosphere. The nine first-stage engines are arranged in a structural form SpaceX calls Octaweb. This change from the v1.0 Falcon 9's square arrangement is aimed at streamlining the manufacturing process.

As part of SpaceX's efforts to develop a reusable launch system, selected first stages include four extensible landing legs and grid fins to control descent. Fins were first tested on the F9R Dev-1 reusable test vehicle. Grid fins were implemented on the Falcon 9 v1.1 on the CRS-5 mission, but ran out of hydraulic fluid before a planned landing.

SpaceX ultimately intends to produce both reusable Falcon 9 and Falcon Heavy launch vehicles with full vertical-landing capability. Initial atmospheric testing of prototype vehicles is being conducted on the Grasshopper experimental technology-demonstrator reusable launch vehicle (RLV), in addition to the booster controlled-descent and landing tests described above.

The v1.1 first stage uses a pyrophoric mixture of triethylaluminium-triethylborane (TEA-TEB) as a first-stage ignitor, the same as was used in the v1.0 version.

Like the Falcon 9 v1.0 and the Saturn series from the Apollo program, the presence of multiple first-stage engines can allow for mission completion even if one of the first-stage engines fails mid-flight.

The main propellant supply tubes from the RP-1 and liquid oxygen tanks to the nine engines on the first stage are 10 cm (4 in) in diameter.

=== Second stage ===
Falcon 9 fairing testing, 27 May 2013

The upper stage is powered by a single Merlin 1D engine modified for vacuum operation.

The interstage, which connects the upper and lower stage for Falcon 9, is a carbon fiber aluminum core composite structure. Separation collets and a pneumatic pusher system separate the stages. The Falcon 9 tank walls and domes are made from aluminium-lithium alloy. SpaceX uses an all-friction stir welded tank, a technique which minimizes manufacturing defects and reduces cost, according to a NASA spokesperson. The second-stage tank of Falcon 9 is simply a shorter version of the first-stage tank and uses most of the same tooling, material and manufacturing techniques. This saves money during vehicle production.

=== Payload fairing ===
The fairing design was completed by SpaceX, with production of the 13 m (43 ft)-long, 5.2 m (17 ft)-diameter payload fairing in Hawthorne, California.

Testing of the new fairing design was completed at NASA's Plum Brook Station facility in spring 2013 where acoustic shock, mechanical vibration, and electromagnetic electrostatic discharge conditions were simulated. Tests were done on a full-size test article in vacuum chamber. SpaceX paid NASA US$581,300 to lease test time in the $150M NASA simulation chamber facility.

The first flight of a Falcon 9 v1.1 (CASSIOPE, September 2013) was the first launch of the Falcon 9 v1.1 as well as the Falcon 9 family configured with a payload fairing. The fairing separated without incident during the launch of CASSIOPE as well as the two subsequent GTO insertion missions. In Dragon missions, the capsule protects any small satellites, negating the need for a fairing.

=== Control ===
SpaceX uses multiple redundant flight computers in a fault-tolerant design. Each Merlin engine is controlled by three voting computers, each of which has two physical processors that constantly check each other. The software runs on Linux and is written in C++.

For flexibility, commercial off-the-shelf parts and system-wide "radiation-tolerant" design are used instead of rad-hardened parts. Falcon 9 v1.1 continues to utilize the triple redundant flight computers and inertial navigation—with GPS overlay for additional orbit insertion accuracy—that were originally used in the Falcon 9 v1.0.

== Development history ==
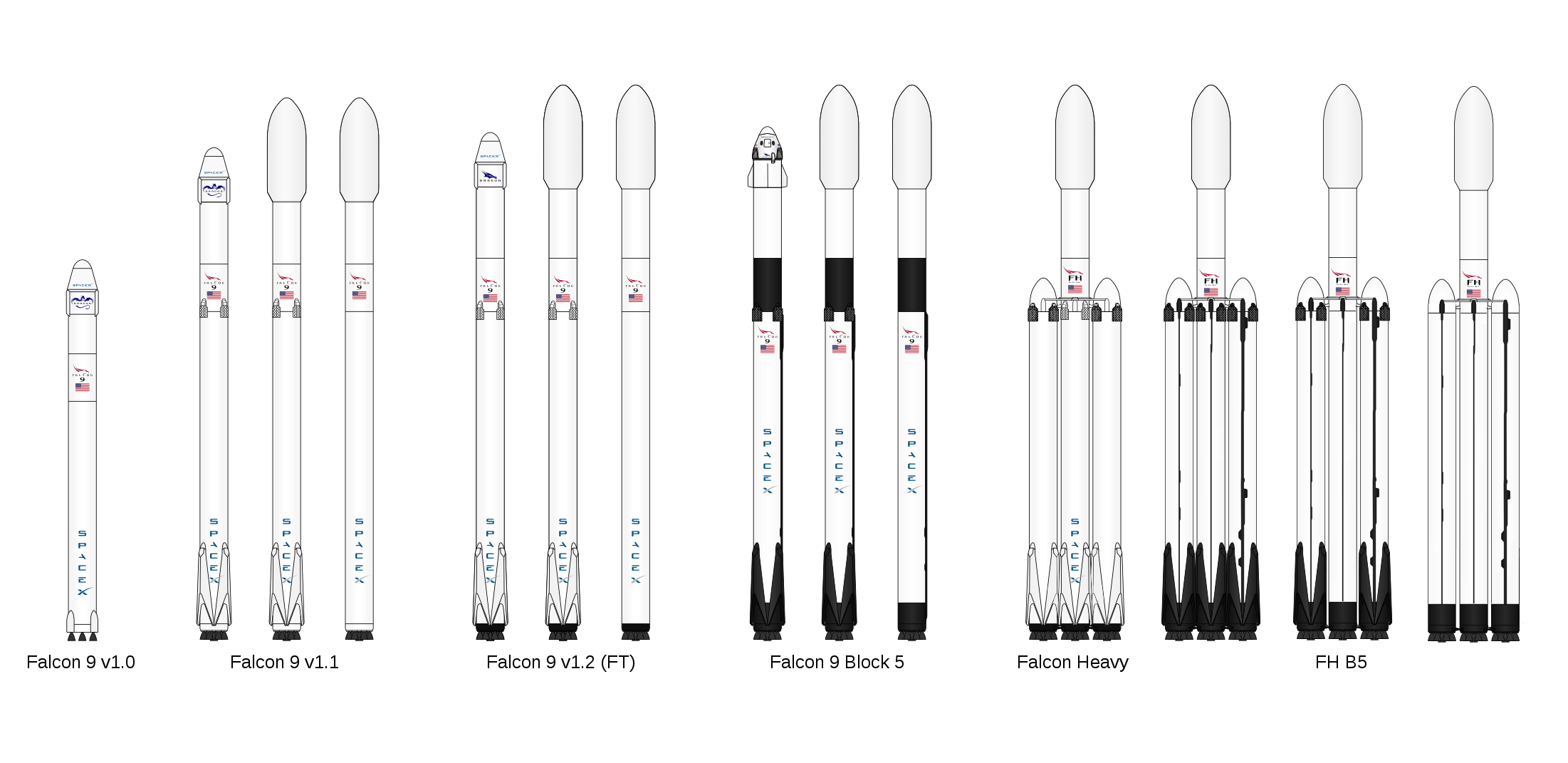
From left to right, Falcon 9 v1.0, three versions of Falcon 9 v1.1, three versions of Falcon 9 v1.2 (Full Thrust), three versions of Falcon 9 Block 5, and four versions of Falcon Heavy.

=== Testing ===
A test of the ignition system for the Falcon 9 v1.1 first stage was conducted in April 2013. On 1 June 2013, a ten-second firing of the Falcon 9 v1.1 first stage occurred; a full-duration, 3-minute firing was expected a few days later.

=== Production ===
By September 2013, SpaceX total manufacturing space had increased to nearly 1,000,000 square feet (93,000 m^{2}) and the factory had been configured to achieve a production rate of up to 40 rocket cores per year, for both the Falcon 9 v1.1 and the tri-core Falcon Heavy. The November 2013 production rate for Falcon 9 vehicles was one per month. The company stated that this would increase to 18 per year in mid-2014, and would be 24 launch vehicles per year by the end of 2014.

As launch manifest and launch rate increases in 2014–2016, SpaceX is looking to increase their launch processing by building dual-track parallel launch processes at the launch facility. As of March 2014, they projected that they would have this in operation sometime in 2015, and were aiming for a 2015 launch pace of about two launches per month.

== Launch history ==
The first launch of the substantially upgraded Falcon 9 v1.1 vehicle successfully flew on 29 September 2013.

The maiden Falcon 9 v1.1 launch included a number of "firsts":

- First use of the upgraded Merlin 1D engines, generating approximately 56 percent more sea-level thrust than the Merlin 1C engines used on all previous Falcon 9 vehicles.
- First use of the significantly longer first stage and second stage, which holds the additional propellant for the more powerful engines.
- The nine Merlin 1D engines on the first stage are arranged in an octagonal pattern with eight engines in a circle and the ninth in the center.
- First launch from SpaceX's new west coast launch facility, Space Launch Complex 4, at Vandenberg Air Force Base, California, and also the first launch over the Pacific ocean using the facilities of the Pacific test range.
- First Falcon 9 launch to carry a satellite payload for a commercial customer, and also the first non-CRS mission. Each prior Falcon 9 launch was of a Dragon capsule or a Dragon-shaped test article, although SpaceX has previously successfully launched and deployed a satellite on the Falcon 1, Flight 5 mission.
- First Falcon 9 launch to have a jettisonable payload fairing, which introduced the risk of an additional separation event.

SpaceX conducted the fifteenth and final flight of the Falcon 9 v1.1 on 17 January 2016. Fourteen of those fifteen launches have successfully delivered their primary payloads to either Low Earth orbit or Geosynchronous Transfer Orbit.

The only failed mission of the Falcon 9 v1.1 was its 14th, SpaceX CRS-7, 28 June 2015, which was lost during its first stage operation, due to an overpressure event in the second stage oxygen tank. (After CRS-7 there was one final launch of V1.1, on 17 January 2016, to launch the Jason-3 payload.)

=== CRS-7 failure, investigation, and changes ===
Investigation traced the accident to the failure of a strut inside the second stage's liquid-oxygen tank. NASA concluded that the most probable cause of the strut failure was a design error: instead of using a stainless-steel eye bolt made of aerospace-grade material, SpaceX chose an industrial-grade material without adequate screening and testing and overlooked the recommended safety margin.

== Reusability ==
The Falcon 9 v1.1 includes several aspects of reusable launch vehicle technology included in its design, as of the initial v1.1 launch in September 2013 (throttleable and restartable engines on the first stage, a first-stage tank design that can structurally accommodate the future addition of landing legs, etc.). The Falcon 9 v1.1's launch occurred two years after SpaceX committed to a privately funded development program with the goal to obtain full and rapid reusability of both stages of the launch vehicle.

Design was complete on the system for "bringing the rocket back to launchpad using only thrusters" in February 2012. The reusable launch system technology is being considered for both the Falcon 9 and the Falcon Heavy, and is considered particularly well suited to the Falcon Heavy where the two outer cores separate from the rocket much earlier in the flight profile, and are therefore moving at slower velocity at stage separation.

A reusable first stage is now being flight tested by SpaceX with the suborbital Grasshopper rocket. By April 2013, a low-altitude, low-speed demonstration test vehicle, Grasshopper v1.0, had made seven VTVL test flights from late-2012 through August 2013, including a 61-second hover flight to an altitude of 250 metres (820 ft).

In March 2013, SpaceX announced that, beginning with the first flight of the stretch version of the Falcon 9 launch vehicle (Falcon 9 v1.1)—which flew in September 2013—every first stage would be instrumented and equipped as a controlled descent test vehicle. SpaceX intends to do propulsive-return over-water tests and "will continue doing such tests until they can do a return to the launch site and a powered landing. They "expect several failures before they 'learn how to do it right.'" SpaceX completed multiple water landings that were successful and they now plan to land the first stage of the flight CRS-5 on an Autonomous drone port in the ocean.

Photos of the first test of the restartable ignition system for the reusable Falcon 9—the Falcon 9-R— nine-engine v1.1 circular-engine configuration were released in April 2013.

In March 2014, SpaceX announced that GTO payload of the future reusable Falcon 9 (F9-R), with only the booster reused, would be approximately 3,500 kg (7,700 lb).

=== Post-mission test flights and landing attempts ===
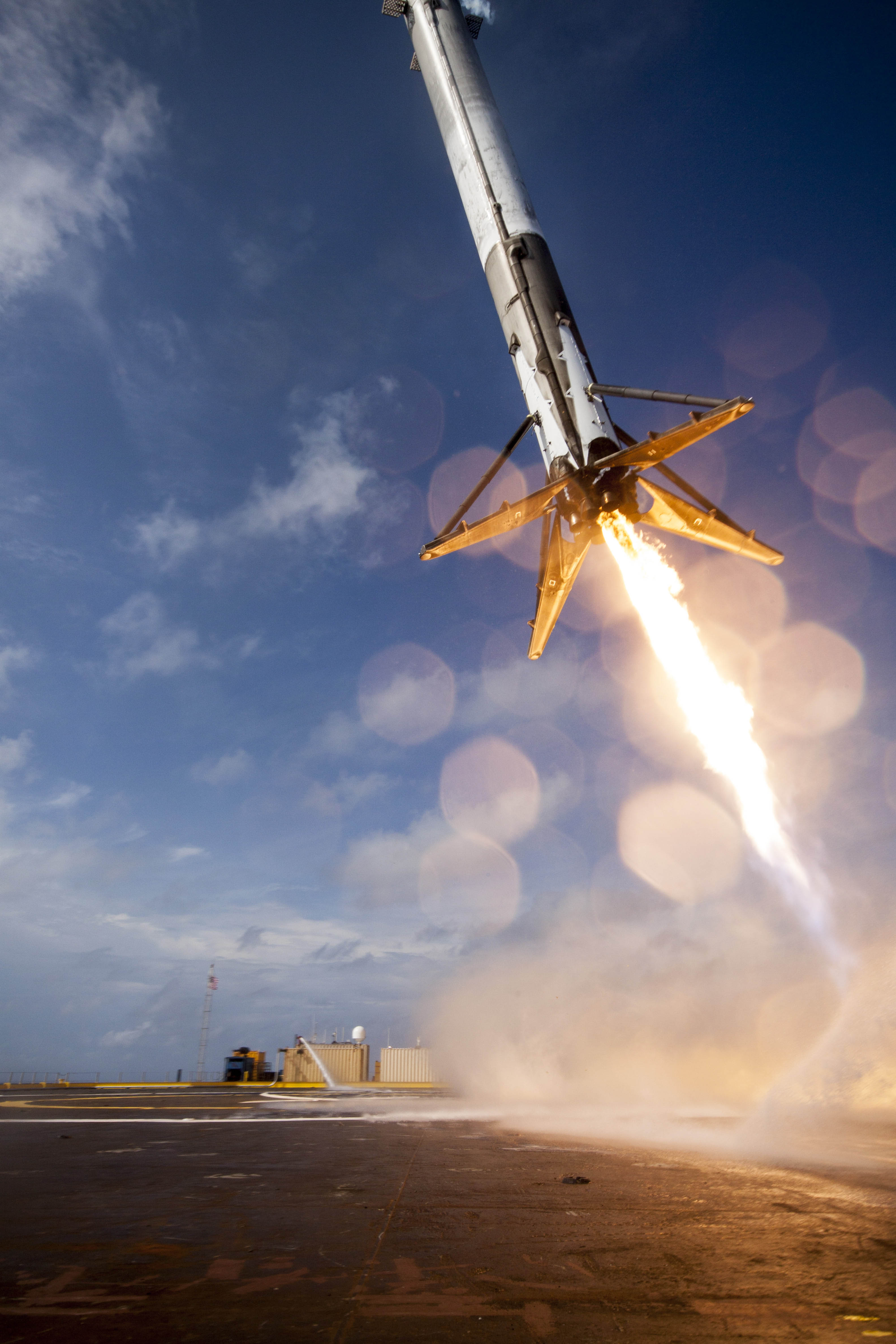
Falcon 9 Flight 17's first stage attempting a controlled landing on the Autonomous Spaceport Drone Ship following the launch of CRS-6 to the International Space Station. The stage landed hard and tipped over after landing.

Several missions of Falcon 9 v1.1 were followed by post-mission test flights calling for the first-stage booster to execute a flip around maneuver, a boostback burn to reduce the rocket's horizontal velocity, a re-entry burn to mitigate atmospheric damage at hypersonic speed, a controlled atmospheric descent with autonomous guidance to the target and finally a landing burn to cut vertical velocity to zero just before reaching the ocean or landing pad. SpaceX announced the test program in March 2013, and their intention to continue to conduct such tests until they can return to the launch site and perform a powered landing.

The first stage of Falcon 9 Flight 6 performed the first test of a controlled descent and propulsive landing over water on 29 September 2013. Although not a complete success, the stage was able to change direction and make a controlled entry into the atmosphere. During the final landing burn, the ACS thrusters could not overcome an aerodynamically induced spin, and centrifugal force deprived the landing engine of fuel leading to early engine shutdown and a hard splashdown which destroyed the first stage. Pieces of wreckage were recovered for further study.

The next test, using the first stage from SpaceX CRS-3, led to a successful soft landing in the ocean, however the booster presumably broke up in heavy seas before it could be recovered.

After further ocean landing tests, the first stage of the CRS-5 launch vehicle attempted to land on a floating platform, the autonomous spaceport drone ship, in January 2015. The rocket guided itself to the ship successfully but landed too hard for survival. The first stage of the CRS-6 mission managed a soft landing on the platform; however, excess lateral velocity caused it to quickly tip over and explode. SpaceX CEO Elon Musk indicated that a throttle valve for the engine was stuck and did not respond quickly enough to achieve a smooth landing.

Falcon 9 v1.1 was never successfully recovered or reused until its retirement. However the test program continued with Falcon 9 Full Thrust flights, which achieved both the first ground landing in December 2015 and the first ship landing in April 2016.

== Launch sites ==
Falcon 9 v1.1 rockets were launched from both Launch Complex 40 at Cape Canaveral Air Force Station and Launch Complex 4E at Vandenberg Air Force Base. The Vandenberg site was used for both the v1.1 maiden flight on 29 September 2013 and its last mission on 17 January 2016.

Additional launch sites at Kennedy Space Center Launch Complex 39 pad A and Starbase, Texas will launch the rocket's successor variants Falcon 9 Full Thrust and Falcon Heavy.

== Launch prices ==
As of October 2015, the Falcon 9 v1.1 commercial launch price was US$61.2 million (up from US$56.5 million in October 2013) competing for commercial launches in an increasingly competitive market.

NASA resupply missions to the ISS—which include the provision of the space capsule payload, a new Dragon cargo spacecraft for each flight—had an average price of $133 million. The first twelve cargo transport flights contracted to NASA were done at one time, so no price change is reflected for the v1.1 launches as opposed to the v1.0 launches. The contract was for a specific amount of cargo carried to, and returned from, the Space Station over a fixed number of flights.

SpaceX stated that due to mission assurance process costs, launches for the U.S. military would be priced about 50% more than commercial launches, so a Falcon 9 launch would sell for about $90 million to the US government, compared to an average cost to the US government of nearly $400 million for current non-SpaceX launches.

=== Secondary payload services ===
Falcon 9 payload services include secondary and tertiary payload connection via an ESPA-ring, the same interstage adapter first utilized for launching secondary payloads on US DoD missions that utilize the Evolved Expendable Launch Vehicles (EELV) Atlas V and Delta IV. This enables secondary and even tertiary missions with minimal impact to the original mission. As of 2011, SpaceX announced pricing for ESPA-compatible payloads on the Falcon 9.

== See also ==
- Falcon Heavy
- SpaceX launch vehicles
- SpaceX Dragon 1 and SpaceX Dragon 2
- Comparison of orbital launch systems
- List of Falcon 9 and Falcon Heavy launches
