= Intelsat 22 =

Geostationary communications satellite

- Names: IS-22
- Mission type: Communications
- Operator: Intelsat
- COSPAR ID: 2012-011A
- SATCAT no.: 38098
- Website: https://www.jsat.net/en/
- Mission duration: 18 years (planned)

Spacecraft properties
- Spacecraft: Intelsat 22
- Spacecraft type: Boeing 702
- Bus: BSS-702MP
- Manufacturer: Boeing Space Systems
- Launch mass: 6,199 kg (13,666 lb)

Start of mission
- Launch date: 23 March 2012, 12:10:32 UTC
- Rocket: Proton-M / Briz-M
- Launch site: Baikonur, Site 200/39
- Contractor: International Launch Services (ILS)
- Entered service: May 2012

Orbital parameters
- Reference system: Geocentric orbit
- Regime: Geostationary orbit
- Longitude: 72° East

Transponders
- Band: 60 transponders: 24 C-band; 18 Ku-band; 18 UHF
- Coverage area: Europe, Africa, Middle East, Asia, Australia

Intelsat 22, is a communications satellite in geostationary orbit and constructed by Boeing Space Systems for the Intelsat Corporation. The satellite was planned to be located at 72° East Longitude over the Indian Ocean.

The Australian Defence Force (ADF) signed a US$167 million contract with Intelsat for the UHF payload on the Intelsat 22 satellite for 15 years of service.

== Communications payloads ==
Intelsat 22 had three distinct communications payloads. A 48 channel C-band payload with 36 MHz channels, a 24 channel Ku-band payload with 36 MHz channels, and an 18 channel Ultra high frequency (UHF) payload with 25 kHz channels.

=== C-band payload ===
The Intelsat 24 C-band payload consists of 48 operational 36 MHz channels. Two antennas provide service to the Africa and Asia regions. There is some cross connect capability between the two regions.

=== Ku-band payload ===
The Intelsat 18 Ku-band payload consists of 24 operational 36 MHz channels with coverage for the Middle East, Africa, and Europe.

=== UHF payload ===
The UHF payload consists of 18 operational 25 kHz channels which were added to the Intelsat 22 satellite as a result of the contract with ADF (Australia).

== Launch ==
Intelsat 22 was launched on 25 March 2012 at 12:10:32 UTC.
