= Intelsat 21 =

Geostationary communications satellite

- Names: IS-21
- Mission type: Communications
- Operator: Intelsat
- COSPAR ID: 2012-045A
- SATCAT no.: 38749
- Mission duration: 15 years (planned)

Spacecraft properties
- Spacecraft: Intelsat 21
- Spacecraft type: Boeing 702
- Bus: BSS-702MP
- Manufacturer: Boeing Satellite Systems
- Launch mass: 5,984 kg (13,192 lb)

Start of mission
- Launch date: 19 August 2012, 06:54:59 UTC
- Rocket: Zenit-3SL
- Launch site: Odyssey, Pacific Ocean
- Contractor: Sea Launch

Orbital parameters
- Reference system: Geocentric orbit
- Regime: Geostationary orbit
- Longitude: 58° West

Transponders
- Band: 60 transponders: 24 C-band; 36 Ku-band
- Coverage area: Canada, United States, Latin America, Caribbean, Europe

Intelsat 21 is a communications satellite manufactured by Boeing Space Systems (BSS) for the Intelsat Corporation, based on the BSS-702MP satellite bus. It was launched on 19 August 2012 at 06:54:59 UTC by a Zenit-3SL launch vehicle from a mobile platform in the equatorial Pacific Ocean. and replaces the Intelsat 9 satellite at 58° West Longitude.
