= Falcon Heavy =

Partially reusable super-heavy-lift launch vehicle by SpaceX

- Launch of NASA's Nancy Grace Roman Space Telescope on Falcon Heavy as the agency's latest flagship mission
- Function: Super heavy-lift launch vehicle (Note: If the boosters and center core are recovered, it only qualifies as a heavy-lift launch vehicle.)
- Manufacturer: SpaceX
- Country of origin: United States
- Cost per launch: Reusable: US$97 million (2022); Expendable: US$150 million (2017)

Size
- Height: 70.0 m (229.6 ft)
- Diameter: 3.7 m (12 ft) (each booster)
- Width: 12.2 m (40 ft)
- Mass: 1,420,000 kg (3,130,000 lb)
- Stages: 2.5

Capacity

Payload to LEO
- Orbital inclination: 28.5°
- Mass: 63,800 kg (140,700 lb) when fully expended (Note: Theoretical, would need a custom payload adapter); 57,000 kg (126,000 lb) with boosters recovered; <50,000 kg (110,000 lb) with boosters and core recovered

Payload to GTO
- Orbital inclination: 27.0°
- Mass: 26,700 kg (58,900 lb)

Payload to Mars
- Mass: 16,800 kg (37,000 lb)

Associated rockets
- Family: Falcon 9 Vehicle Family
- Based on: Falcon 9
- Comparable: Delta IV Heavy; New Glenn; NGLV; Vulcan Centaur

Launch history
- Status: Active
- Launch sites: Kennedy, LC-39A; Vandenberg, SLC-6 (future)
- Total launches: 14
- Success(es): 14
- Landings: Cores: 1 / 3 attempts (Note: Later lost at sea); Boosters: 24 / 24 attempts
- First flight: February 6, 2018 (test flight)
- Last flight: October 2, 2026 (NROL-97)
- Carries passengers or cargo: Arabsat-6A; Boeing X-37B; EchoStar XXIV; Europa Clipper; GOES-19; Psyche; ViaSat-3

Boosters
- No. boosters: 2
- Powered by: 9 × Merlin 1D per booster
- Maximum thrust: SL: 7,600 kN (1,700,000 lb_{f}) each; vac: 8,200 kN (1,800,000 lb_{f}) each
- Total thrust: SL: 15,200 kN (3,400,000 lb_{f}); vac: 16,400 kN (3,700,000 lb_{f})
- Specific impulse: SL: 282 s (2.77 km/s); vac: 311 s (3.05 km/s)
- Burn time: 154.3 seconds
- Propellant: LOX / RP-1

First stage
- Powered by: 9 × Merlin 1D
- Maximum thrust: SL: 7,600 kN (1,700,000 lb_{f}); vac: 8,200 kN (1,800,000 lb_{f})
- Specific impulse: SL: 282 s (2.77 km/s); vac: 311 s (3.05 km/s)
- Burn time: 187 seconds
- Propellant: LOX / RP-1

Second stage
- Powered by: 1 × Merlin 1D Vacuum
- Maximum thrust: 934 kN (210,000 lb_{f})
- Specific impulse: 348 s (3.41 km/s)
- Burn time: 397 seconds
- Propellant: LOX / RP-1

Falcon Heavy is a super heavy-lift launch vehicle (Note: If the boosters and center core are recovered, it only qualifies as a heavy-lift launch vehicle.) with partial reusability that can carry cargo into Earth orbit and beyond. It is designed, manufactured and operated by American aerospace company SpaceX.

The rocket consists of a center core on which two Falcon 9 boosters are attached, and a second stage on top of the center core. Falcon Heavy is one of the highest-capacity launch vehicles in service, alongside NASA's Space Launch System (SLS) and SpaceX's Starship, and has the fourth-highest capacity of any rocket to reach orbit, trailing behind the SLS, Energia and the Saturn V.

SpaceX conducted Falcon Heavy's maiden launch on February 6, 2018, at 20:45 UTC. As a dummy payload, the rocket carried a Tesla Roadster belonging to SpaceX founder Elon Musk, with a mannequin dubbed "Starman" in the driver's seat. The second Falcon Heavy launch occurred on April 11, 2019, and all three booster rockets successfully returned to Earth. The third Falcon Heavy launch successfully occurred on June 25, 2019. Since then, Falcon Heavy has been certified for the National Security Space Launch (NSSL) program.

Falcon Heavy was designed to be able to carry humans into space beyond low Earth orbit (LEO), although as of February 2018, SpaceX does not intend to transport people on Falcon Heavy, nor pursue the human-rating certification process to transport NASA astronauts. Both Falcon Heavy and Falcon 9 are expected to eventually be superseded by the Starship super-heavy lift launch vehicle, which is currently in development.

== History ==
Concepts for a Falcon Heavy launch vehicle using three Falcon 1 core boosters, with an approximate payload-to-LEO capacity of two tons, were initially discussed as early as 2003. The concept for three core booster stages of the company's then as-yet-unflown Falcon 9 was referred to in 2005 as the Falcon 9 Heavy.

SpaceX unveiled the plan for the Falcon Heavy to the public at a Washington, D.C., news conference in April 2011, with an initial test flight expected in 2013.

A number of factors delayed the planned maiden flight to 2018, including two anomalies with Falcon 9 launch vehicles, which required all engineering resources to be dedicated to failure analysis, halting flight operations for many months. The integration and structural challenges of combining three Falcon 9 cores were more difficult than expected.

In July 2017, Elon Musk said, "It actually ended up being way harder to do Falcon Heavy than we thought. ... We were pretty naive about that".

The initial test flight for the first Falcon Heavy lifted off on February 6, 2018, at 20:45 UTC, carrying its dummy payload, Elon Musk's personal Tesla Roadster, beyond Mars orbit.

=== Conception and funding ===
Musk first mentioned Falcon Heavy in a September 2005 news update, referring to a customer request from 18 months prior. Various solutions using the planned Falcon 5 (which was never flown) had been explored, but the only cost-effective, reliable iteration was one that used a 9-engine first stage—the Falcon 9. The Falcon Heavy was developed using private capital with Musk stating that the cost was more than US$500 million. No government financing was provided for its development.

=== Design and development ===
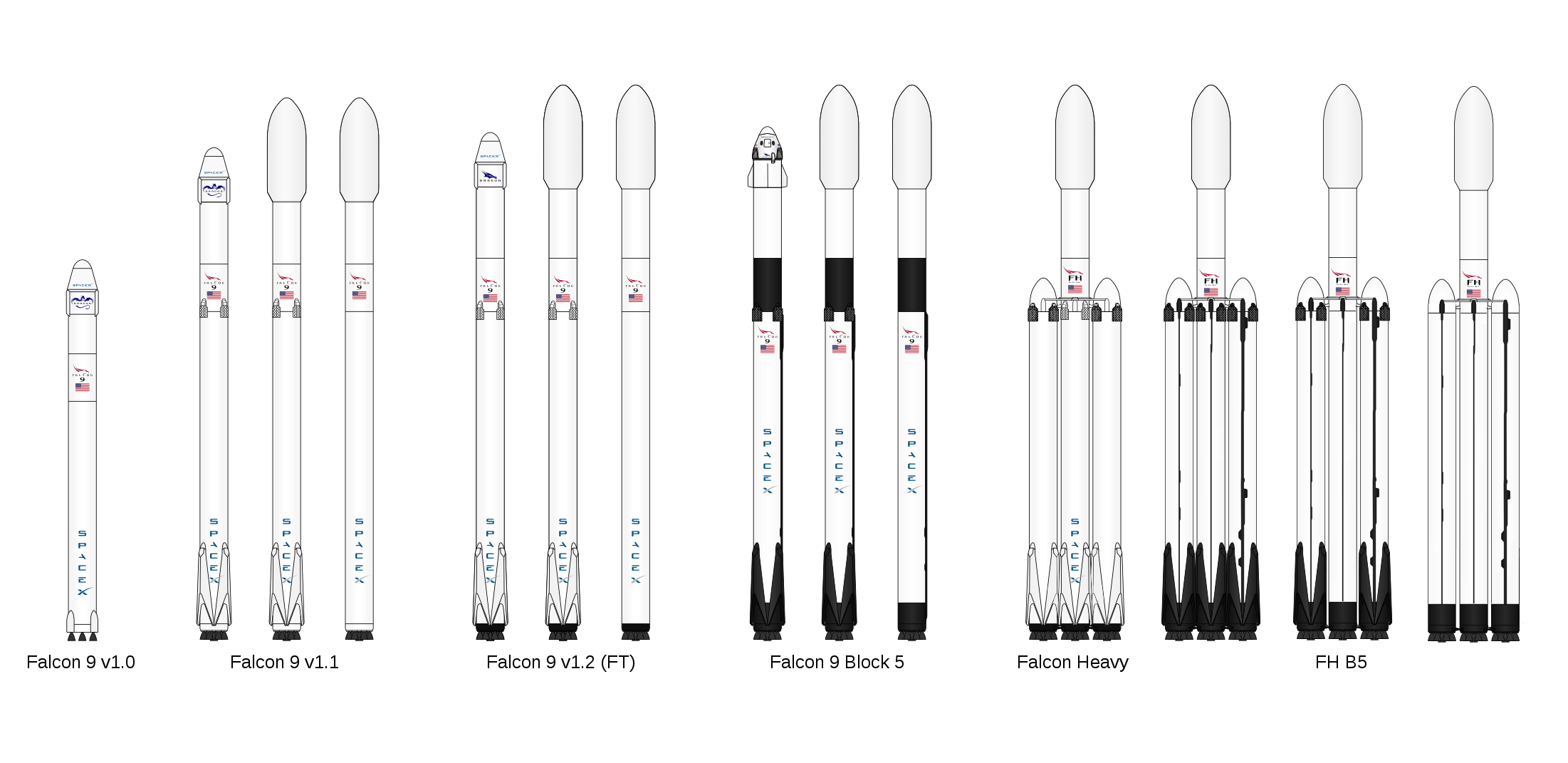
From left to right, Falcon 9 v1.0, three versions of Falcon 9 v1.1, three versions of Falcon 9 v1.2 (Full Thrust), three versions of Falcon 9 Block 5, Falcon Heavy and Falcon Heavy Block 5

The Falcon Heavy design is based on Falcon 9's fuselage and engines. By 2008, SpaceX had been aiming for the first launch of Falcon 9 in 2009, while "Falcon 9 Heavy would be in a couple of years". Speaking at the 2008 Mars Society Conference, Musk also indicated that he expected a hydrogen-fueled upper stage would follow two to three years later (which would have been around 2013).

By April 2011, the capabilities and performance of the Falcon 9 vehicle were better understood, SpaceX having completed two successful demonstration missions to low Earth orbit (LEO), one of which included reignition of the second-stage engine. At a press conference at the National Press Club in Washington, D.C., on April 5, 2011, Musk stated that Falcon Heavy would "carry more payload to orbit or escape velocity than any vehicle in history, apart from the Saturn V Moon rocket ... and Soviet Energia rocket". In the same year, with the expected increase in demand for both variants, SpaceX announced plans to expand manufacturing capacity "as we build towards the capability of producing a Falcon 9 first stage or Falcon Heavy side booster every week and an upper stage every two weeks".

In 2015, SpaceX announced a number of changes to the Falcon Heavy rocket, worked in parallel to the upgrade of the Falcon 9 v1.1 launch vehicle. In December 2016, SpaceX released a photo showing the Falcon Heavy interstage at the company headquarters in Hawthorne, California.

=== Testing ===
By May 2013, a new, partly underground test stand was being built at the SpaceX Rocket Development and Test Facility in McGregor, Texas, specifically to test the triple cores and twenty-seven rocket engines of the Falcon Heavy. By May 2017, SpaceX conducted the first static fire test of flight-design Falcon Heavy center core at the McGregor facility.

In July 2017, Musk discussed publicly the challenges of testing a complex launch vehicle like the three-core Falcon Heavy, indicating that a large extent of the new design "is really impossible to test on the ground" and could not be effectively tested independent of actual flight tests.

By September 2017, all three first stage cores had completed their static fire tests on the ground test stand. The first Falcon Heavy static fire test was conducted on January 24, 2018.

=== Maiden flight ===
In April 2011, Musk was planning for a first launch of Falcon Heavy from Vandenberg Air Force Base, California on the United States west coast in 2013. SpaceX refurbished Launch Complex 4E at Vandenberg AFB to accommodate Falcon 9 and Heavy. The first launch from the Cape Canaveral, Florida east coast launch complex was planned for late 2013 or 2014.

Due partly to the failure of SpaceX CRS-7 in June 2015, SpaceX rescheduled the maiden Falcon Heavy flight in September 2015 to occur no earlier than April 2016. The flight was to be launched from the refurbished Kennedy Space Center Launch Complex 39A. The flight was postponed again to late 2016, early 2017, summer 2017, late 2017 and finally to February 2018.

At a July 2017 meeting of the International Space Station Research and Development meeting in Washington, D.C., Musk downplayed expectations for the success of the maiden flight:

There's a real good chance the vehicle won't make it to orbit ... I hope it makes it far enough away from the pad that it does not cause pad damage. I would consider even that a win, to be honest.

In December 2017, Musk tweeted that the dummy payload on the maiden Falcon Heavy launch would be his personal Tesla Roadster playing David Bowie's "Space Oddity" (though the song actually used for the launch was "Life on Mars"), and that it would be launched into an orbit around the Sun that will reach the orbit of Mars. He released pictures in the following days. The car had three cameras attached to provide "epic views".

On December 28, 2017, the Falcon Heavy was moved to the launch pad in preparation of a static fire test of all 27 engines, which was expected on January 19, 2018. However, due to the U.S. government partial shutdown that began on January 20, 2018, the testing and launch were further delayed. The static fire test was conducted on January 24, 2018. Musk confirmed via Twitter that the test "was good" and later announced the rocket would be launched on February 6, 2018.

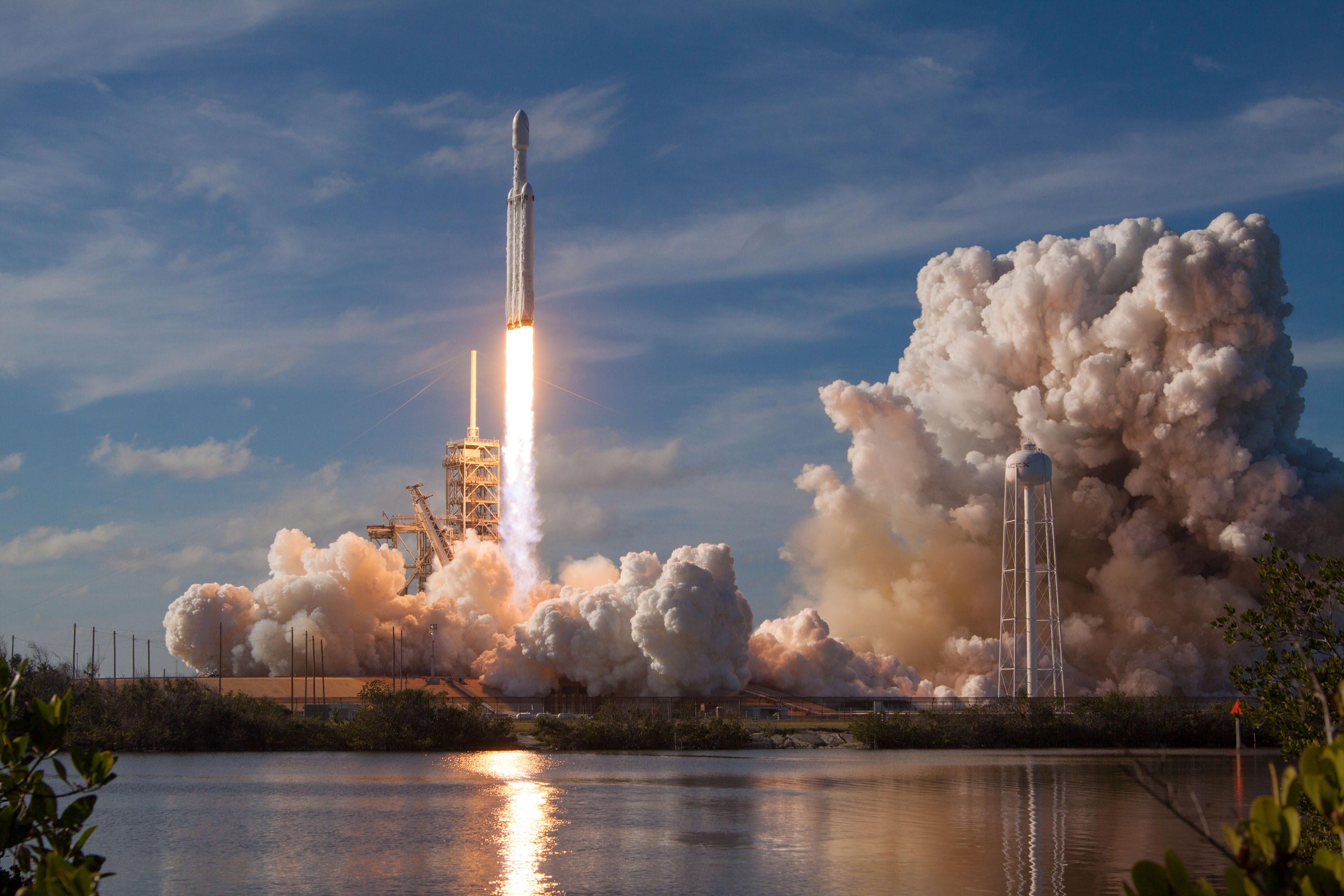
Maiden launch of the Falcon Heavy

On February 6, 2018, after a delay of over two hours due to high winds, Falcon Heavy lifted off at 20:45 UTC. Its side boosters landed safely on Landing Zones 1 and 2 a few minutes later. However, only one of the three engines on the center booster that were intended to restart ignited during descent, causing the booster to be destroyed upon impacting the ocean at a speed of over 480 km/h (300 mph).

Initially, Elon Musk tweeted that the Roadster had overshot its planned heliocentric orbit, and would reach the asteroid belt. Later, observations by telescopes showed that the Roadster would only slightly exceed the orbit of Mars at aphelion.

=== Later flights ===
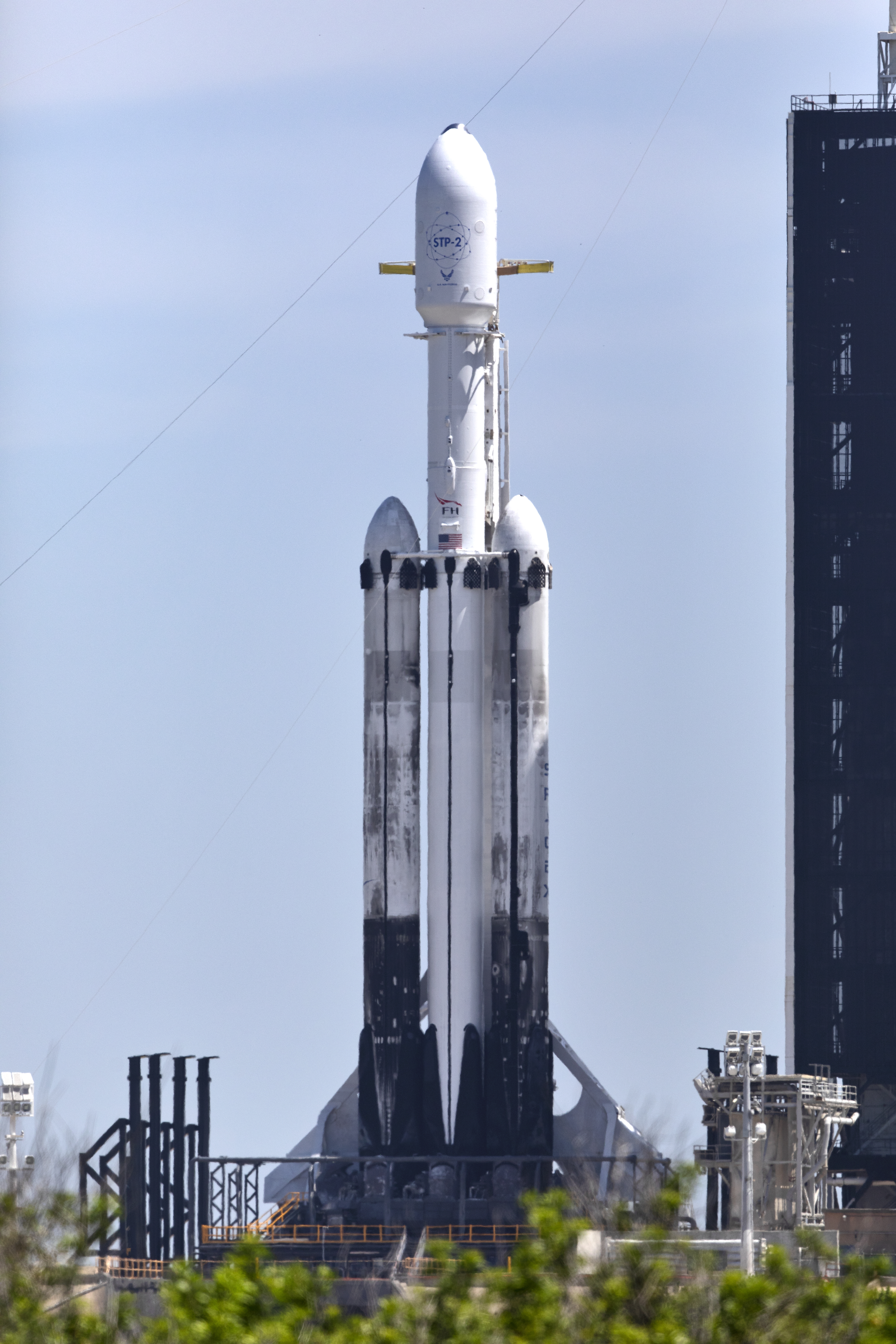
Falcon Heavy built to Falcon 9 Block 5 specifications on the launch pad in June 2019

A year after the successful demo flight, SpaceX had signed five commercial contracts worth US$500–750 million, meaning that it had managed to cover the development cost of the rocket. The second flight, and first commercial one, occurred on April 11, 2019, launching Arabsat-6A, with all three boosters landing successfully for the first time.

The third flight occurred on June 25, 2019, launching the STP-2 (U.S. Department of Defense Space Test Program) payload. The payload was composed of 25 small spacecraft. Operational Geostationary transfer orbit (GTO) missions for Intelsat and Inmarsat, which were planned for late 2017, were moved to the Falcon 9 Full Thrust rocket version as it had become powerful enough to lift those heavy payloads in its expendable configuration. In June 2022, the U.S. Space Force certified Falcon Heavy for launching its top secret satellites, with the first such launch being USSF-44 which happened at November 1, 2022; and the second of which being USSF-67, which was launched 11 weeks after USSF-44. ViaSat selected the Falcon Heavy in late 2018 for the launch of its ViaSat-3 satellite which was scheduled to launch in the 2020–2022 timeframe; however it would not launch until May 1, 2023. On October 13, 2023, Falcon Heavy embarked on its 8th flight carrying NASA's Psyche probe to the asteroid 16 Psyche. This mission only had the side boosters return to Earth with the center core expended, a decision made to create more tolerable margins for the mission.

Following the announcement of NASA's Artemis program of returning humans to the Moon, the Falcon Heavy rocket has been mentioned several times as an alternative to the expensive Space Launch System (SLS) program, but NASA decided to exclusively use SLS to launch the Orion capsule. Falcon Heavy was contracted to transport the Dragon XL spacecraft to the Lunar Gateway. It was also selected to launch the first two elements of the Lunar Gateway, the Power and Propulsion Element (PPE), and the Habitation and Logistics Outpost (HALO). However, in March 2026, NASA announced it would pause development of Gateway and reallocate hardware toward a lunar surface base; the PPE is to be repurposed for the SR-1 Freedom nuclear-electric propulsion mission, and work on HALO was halted in June 2026. Falcon Heavy will launch Astrobotic Technology's Griffin lander as part of the Artemis Program's Commercial Lunar Payload Services (CLPS) initiative. On October 14, 2024, Falcon Heavy transported NASA's Europa Clipper into space to explore Jupiter's moon Europa.

== Design ==
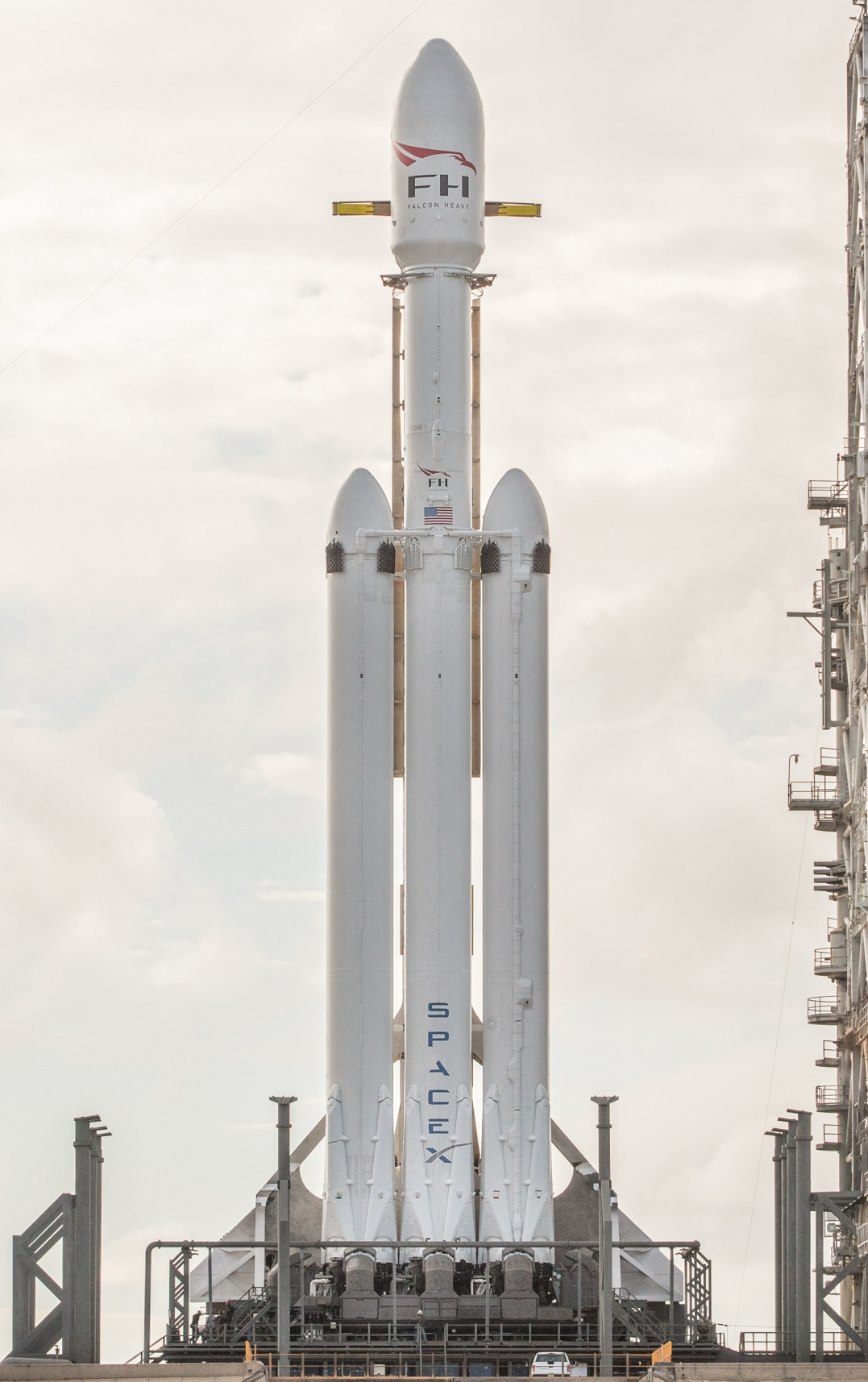
Falcon Heavy on NASA launch pad LC-39A

Falcon Heavy consists of a structurally strengthened Falcon 9 as the "core" component, with two additional Falcon 9 first stages with aerodynamic nose-cones mounted outboard serving as strap-on boosters, conceptually similar to the Delta IV Heavy launcher and proposals for the Atlas V Heavy and Russian Angara A5V. This triple first stage carries a standard Falcon 9 second stage, which in turn carries the payload in a fairing. Falcon Heavy can carry a payload of 63,800 kg (140,700 lb) to low Earth orbit, 26,700 kg (58,900 lb) to Geostationary Transfer Orbit, and 16,800 kg (37,000 lb) to trans-Mars injection. The rocket was designed to meet or exceed all current requirements of human rating. The structural safety margins are 40% above flight loads, higher than the 25% margins of other rockets. Falcon Heavy was designed from the outset to carry humans into space and it would restore the possibility of flying crewed missions to the Moon or Mars.

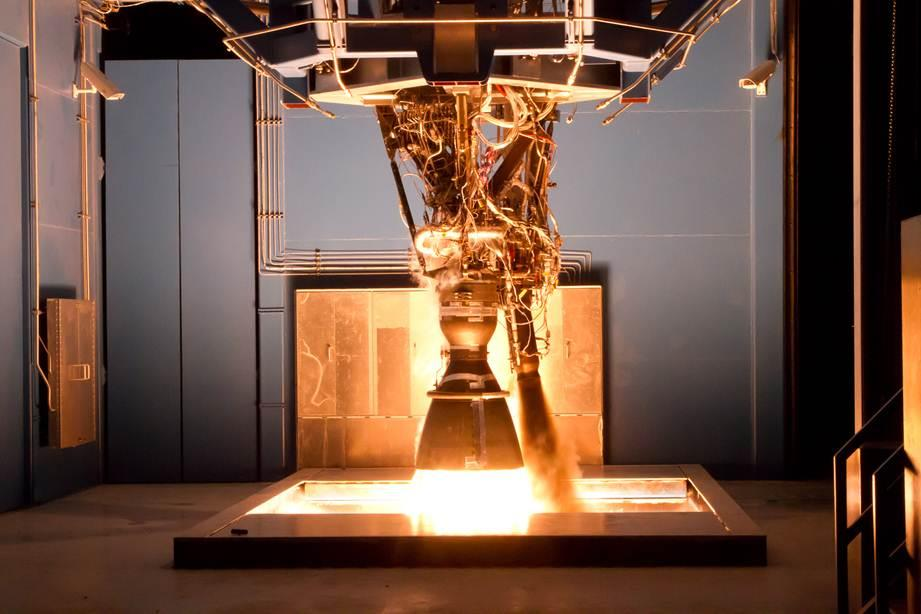
The Merlin 1D engine

The first stage is powered by three Falcon 9 derived cores, each equipped with nine Merlin 1D engines. The Falcon Heavy has a total sea-level thrust at liftoff of 22.82 MN (5,130,000 lbf), from the 27 Merlin 1D engines, while thrust rises to 24.68 MN (5,550,000 lbf) as the craft climbs out of the atmosphere. The upper stage is powered by a single Merlin 1D engine modified for vacuum operation, with a thrust of 934 kN (210,000 lbf), an expansion ratio of 117:1 and a nominal burn time of 397 seconds. At launch, the center core throttles to full power for a few seconds for additional thrust, then throttles down. This allows a longer burn time. After the side boosters separate, the center core throttles back up to maximum thrust. For added reliability of restart, the engine has dual redundant pyrophoric igniters (Triethylaluminium-Triethylborane) (TEA-TEB). The interstage, which connects the upper and lower stage for Falcon 9, is a carbon fiber aluminum core composite structure. Stage separation occurs via reusable separation collets and a pneumatic pusher system. The Falcon 9 tank walls and domes are made from Aluminum–lithium alloy. SpaceX uses an all-friction stir welded tank. The second stage tank of Falcon 9 is simply a shorter version of the first stage tank and uses most of the same tooling, material, and manufacturing techniques. This approach reduces manufacturing costs during vehicle production.

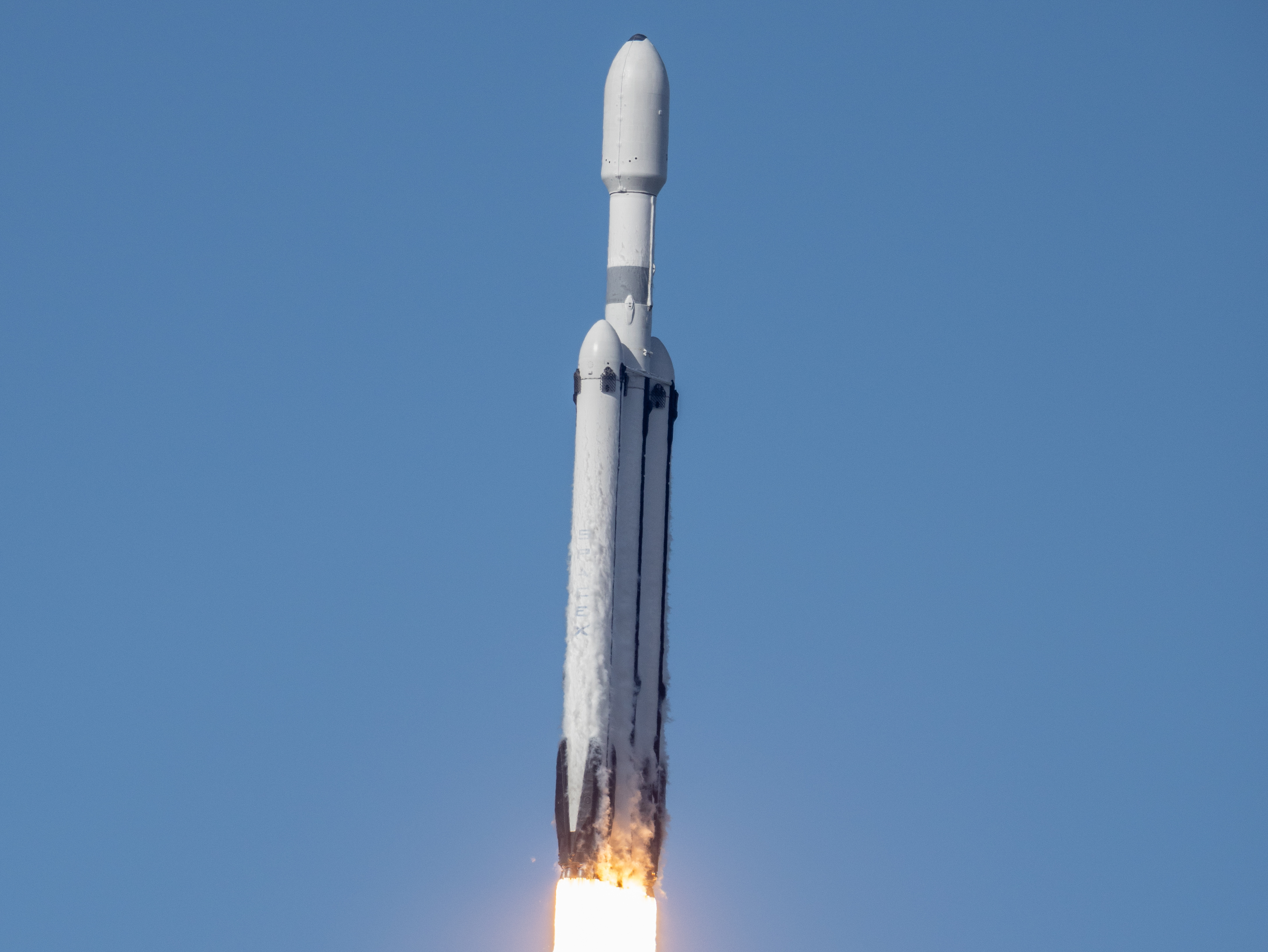
A Falcon Heavy with a second stage mission-extension kit, boosters set up for recovery, and an expendable center core.

All three cores of the Falcon Heavy arrange the engines in a structural form SpaceX calls Octaweb, aimed at streamlining the manufacturing process, and each core includes four extensible landing legs. To control the descent of the boosters and center core through the atmosphere, SpaceX uses four retractable grid fins at the top of each of the three Falcon 9 boosters, which extend after separation. Immediately after the side boosters separate, three engines in each continue to burn for a few seconds in order to control the booster's trajectory safely away from the rocket. The grid fins then deploy as the boosters turn back to Earth, followed by the extending of the landing legs. The side boosters land softly on the ground in fully/partially reusable launch configuration. The center core continues to fire until stage separation. In fully reusable launches, its grid fins and legs deploy and the center core touches down on a drone ship. If boosters are to be expended, then the landing legs and grid fins are omitted from the vehicle. The landing legs are made of carbon fiber with an aluminum honeycomb structure. The four legs stow along the sides of each core during liftoff and extend outward and down just before landing.

Most Falcon Heavy launches have used a second stage equipped with a medium or long mission‑extension kit, which enable a longer coast phase between second‑stage ignitions. The kit includes strengthened COPV tanks for pressurization control, additional TEA-TEB ignition fluid, and most visibly, a gray band painted on the metal skin over the RP-1 tank, which absorbs sunlight and helps prevent the propellant from freezing during the long coast phase.

== Rocket specifications ==
Falcon Heavy specifications and characteristics
Characteristic	First stage core unit (1 × center, 2 × booster)	Second stage	Payload fairing
Height	42.6 m (140 ft)	12.6 m (41 ft)	13.2 m (43 ft)
Diameter	3.7 m (12 ft)	3.7 m (12 ft)	5.2 m (17 ft)
Dry mass	22.2 t (49,000 lb)	4 t (8,800 lb)	1.7 t (3,700 lb)
Fueled mass	433.1 t (955,000 lb)	111.5 t (246,000 lb)	—N/a
Structure type	LOX tank: monocoque Fuel tank: skin and stringer	LOX tank: monocoque Fuel tank: skin and stringer	Monocoque halves
Structure material	Aluminum–lithium skin; aluminum domes	Aluminum–lithium skin; aluminum domes	Carbon fiber
Engine	9 × Merlin 1D	1 × Merlin 1D Vacuum	—N/a
Engine type	Liquid, gas generator	Liquid, gas generator	—N/a
Propellant	Subcooled liquid oxygen, kerosene (RP-1)	Liquid oxygen, kerosene (RP-1)	—N/a
Liquid oxygen tank capacity	287.4 t (634,000 lb)	75.2 t (166,000 lb)	—N/a
Kerosene tank capacity	123.5 t (272,000 lb)	32.3 t (71,000 lb)	—N/a
Engine nozzle	Gimbaled, 16:1 expansion	Gimbaled, 165:1 expansion	—N/a
Engine designer/manufacturer	SpaceX	SpaceX	—N/a
Thrust, stage total	22.82 MN (5,130,000 lbf), sea level	934 kN (210,000 lbf), vacuum	—N/a
Propellant feed system	Turbopump	Turbopump	—N/a
Throttle capability	Yes: 419–816 kN (94,000–183,000 lbf), sea level	Yes: 360–930 kN (82,000–209,000 lbf), vacuum	—N/a
Restart capability	Yes, in 3 engines for boostback, reentry, and landing	Yes, dual redundant TEA-TEB pyrophoric igniters	—N/a
Tank pressurization	Heated helium	Heated helium	—N/a
Ascent attitude control: pitch, yaw	Gimbaled engines	Gimbaled engine and nitrogen gas thrusters	—N/a
Ascent attitude control: roll	Gimbaled engines	Nitrogen gas thruster	—N/a
Coast/descent attitude control	Nitrogen gas thrusters and grid fins	Nitrogen gas thruster	Nitrogen gas thruster
Shutdown process	Commanded	Commanded	—N/a
Stage separation system	Pneumatic	—N/a	Pneumatic

The Falcon Heavy uses a 4.5 m (15 ft) interstage attached to the first stage core. It is a composite structure consisting of an aluminum honeycomb core surrounded by carbon fiber face sheet plies. Unlike for Falcon 9, the black thermal protection layer on the interstage of Block 5 center core boosters is later painted white, as seen in the Falcon Heavy flights so far, probably due to aesthetics of the Falcon Heavy Logo, providing it a greyish color. The overall length of the vehicle at launch is 70 m (230 ft), and the total fueled mass is 1,420 t (3,130,000 lb). Without recovery of any stage, the Falcon Heavy can theoretically inject a 63.8 t (141,000 lb) payload into a low Earth orbit, or 16.8 t (37,000 lb) to Venus or Mars. However, because of the structural limitations, the maximum weight Falcon Heavy can lift is reduced.

The Falcon Heavy includes first-stage recovery systems, to allow SpaceX to return the first stage boosters to the launch site as well as recover the first stage core following landing at an Autonomous Spaceport Drone Ship barge after completion of primary mission requirements. These systems include four deployable landing legs, which are locked against each first-stage tank core during ascent and deploy just prior to touchdown. Excess propellant reserved for Falcon Heavy first-stage recovery operations will be diverted for use on the primary mission objective, if required, ensuring sufficient performance margins for successful missions. The nominal payload capacity to a geostationary transfer orbit (GTO) is 8 t (18,000 lb) with recovery of all three first-stage cores (the price per launch is US$97 million), versus 26.7 t (59,000 lb) in fully expendable mode. The Falcon Heavy can also inject a 16 t (35,000 lb) payload into GTO if only the two side boosters are recovered.

== Capabilities ==
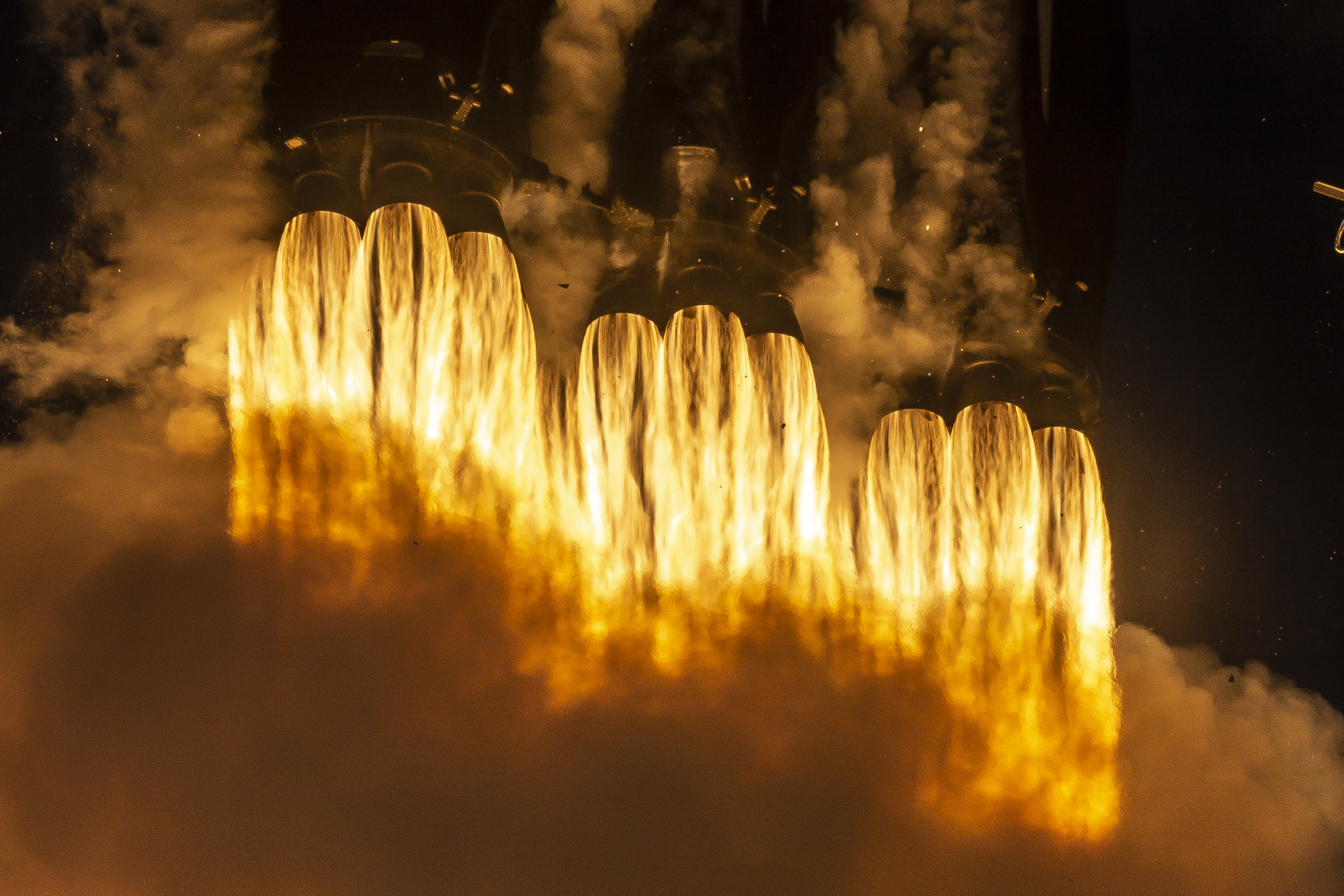
Twenty-seven Merlin engines firing during launch of Arabsat-6A in 2019

The partially reusable Falcon Heavy falls into the heavy-lift range of launch systems, capable of lifting 20–50 t (44,000–110,000 lb) into low Earth orbit (LEO), under the classification system used by a NASA human spaceflight review panel. A fully expendable Falcon Heavy is in the super heavy-lift category with a maximum payload of 64 t (141,000 lb) to LEO.

The initial concept (Falcon 9-S9 2005) envisioned payloads of 24.75 t (54,600 lb) to LEO, but by April 2011 this was projected to be up to 53 t (117,000 lb) with geostationary transfer orbit (GTO) payloads up to 12 t (26,000 lb). Later reports in 2011 projected higher payloads beyond LEO, including 19 t (42,000 lb) to GTO, 16 t (35,000 lb) to translunar trajectory, and 14 t (31,000 lb) on a trans-Martian orbit to Mars.

By late 2013, SpaceX raised the projected GTO payload for Falcon Heavy to 21.2 t (47,000 lb).

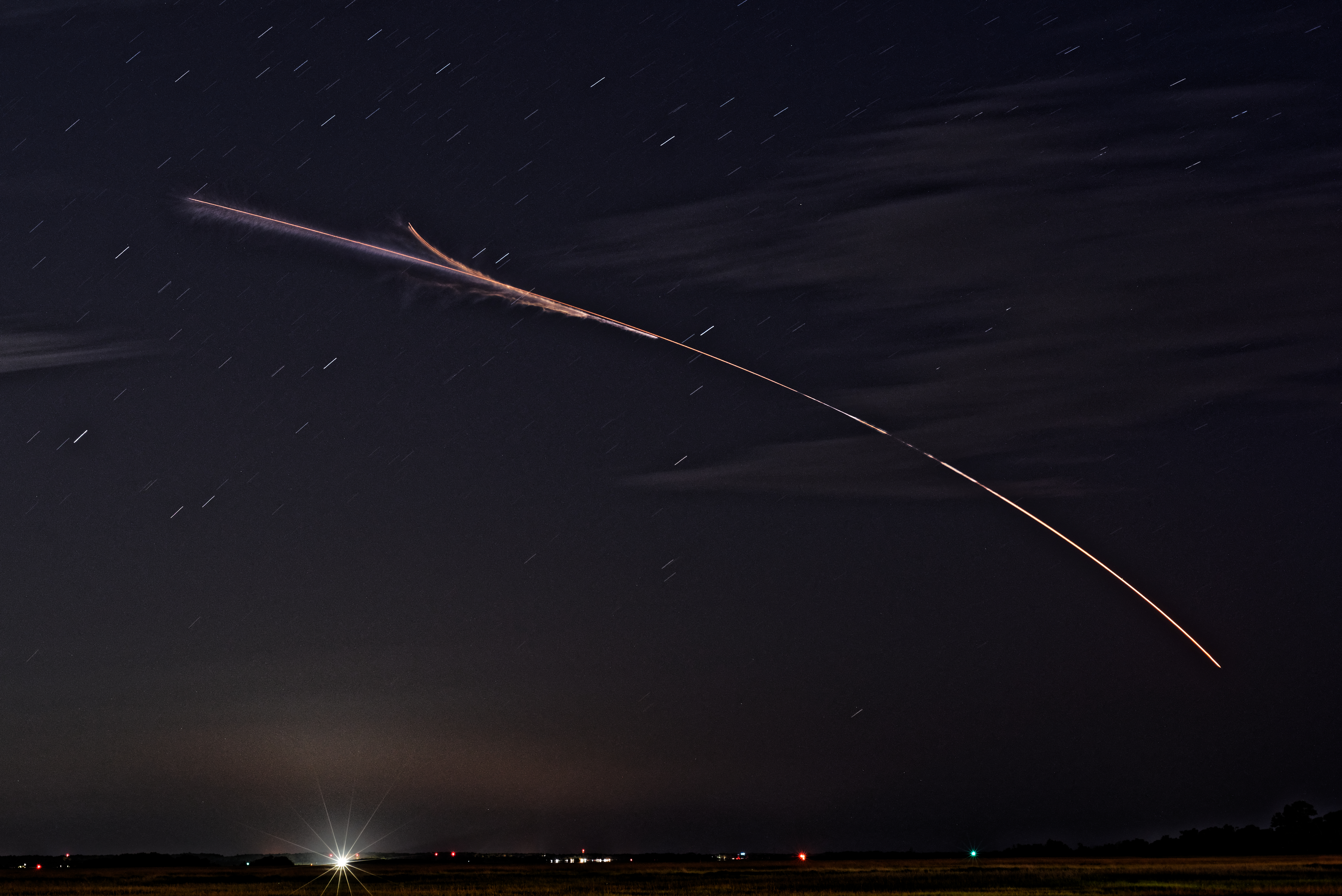
Long exposure of a night launch, June 25, 2019

In April 2017, the projected LEO payload for Falcon Heavy was raised from 54.4 to 63.8 t (120,000 to 141,000 lb). The maximum payload is achieved when the rocket flies a fully expendable launch profile, not recovering any of the three first-stage boosters. With just the core booster expended, and two side-boosters recovered, Musk estimates the payload penalty to be around 10%, which would still yield over 57 t (126,000 lb) of lift capability to LEO. Returning all three boosters to the launch site rather than landing them on drone ships would yield about 30 t of payload to LEO.

Maximum theoretical payload capacity
Destination	Falcon Heavy			Falcon 9
Destination	August 2013 to April 2016	May 2016 to March 2017	Since April 2017	Falcon 9
LEO (28.5°) expendable	53 t	54.4 t	63.8 t	22.8 t
GTO (27.0°) expendable	21.2 t	22.2 t	26.7 t	8.3 t
GTO (27.0°) reusable	6.4 t	6.4 t	8 t	5.5 t
Mars	13.2 t	13.6 t	16.8 t	4 t
Pluto	–	2.9 t	3.5 t	–

=== Reusability ===
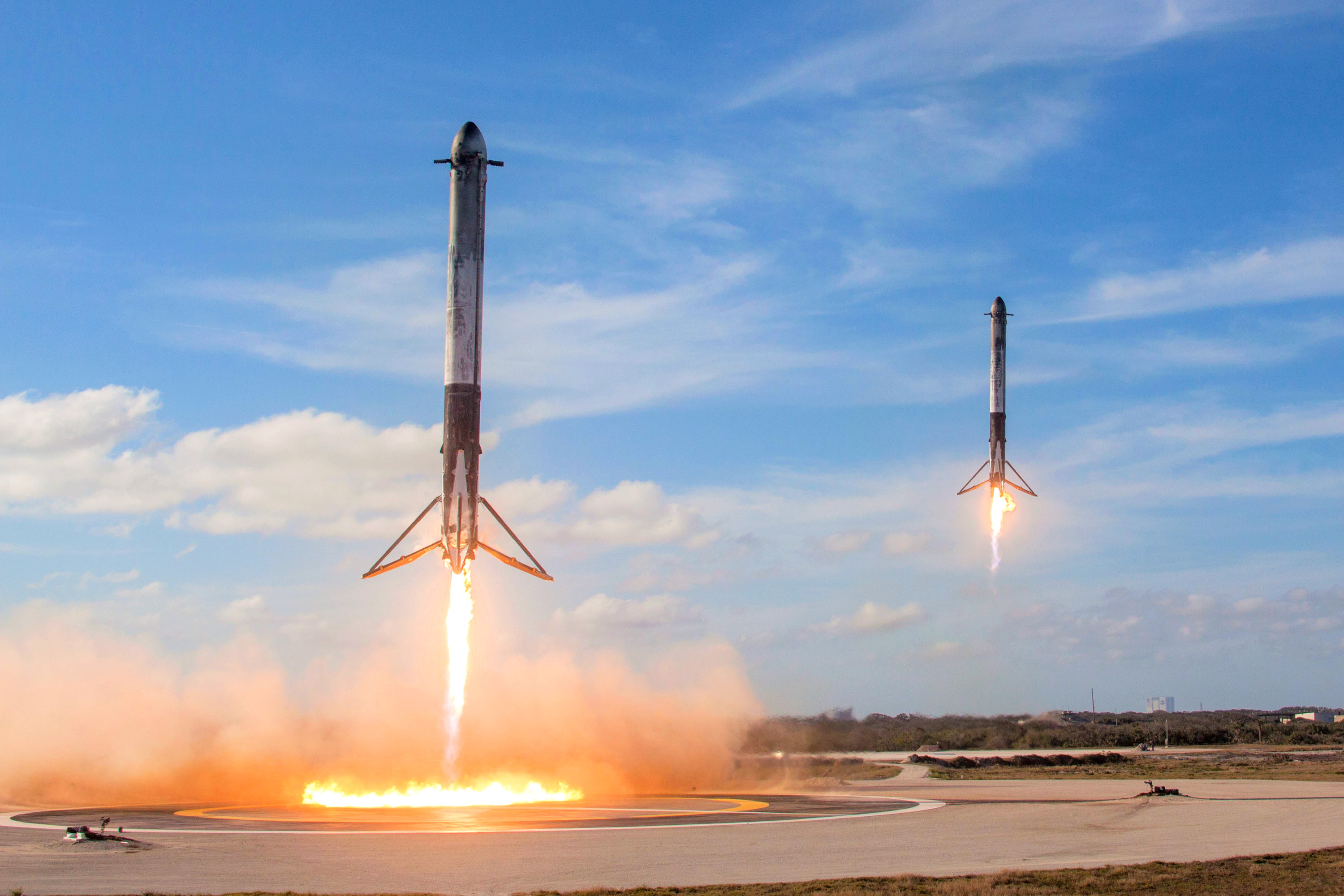
Falcon Heavy reusable side boosters land in unison at Cape Canaveral Landing Zones 1 and 2 following a test flight on February 6, 2018

From 2013 to 2016, SpaceX conducted parallel development of a reusable rocket architecture for Falcon 9, that applies to parts of Falcon Heavy as well. Early on, SpaceX had expressed hopes that all rocket stages would eventually be reusable. SpaceX has since demonstrated routine land and sea recovery of the Falcon 9 first stage, and has successfully recovered multiple payload fairings. In the case of Falcon Heavy, the two outer cores separate from the rocket earlier in the flight, and are thus moving at a lower velocity than in a Falcon 9 launch profile. For the first flight of Falcon Heavy, SpaceX had considered attempting to recover the second stage, but did not execute this plan.

Falcon Heavy payload performance to geosynchronous transfer orbit (GTO) is reduced by the reusable technology, but at a much lower price. When recovering all three booster cores, GTO payload is 8 t (18,000 lb). If only the two outside cores are recovered while the center core is expended, GTO payload would be approximately 16 t (35,000 lb). As a comparison, the next-heaviest contemporary rocket until April 2024, the fully expendable Delta IV Heavy, could deliver 14.2 t (31,000 lb) to GTO.

=== Propellant crossfeed ===
Falcon Heavy was originally designed with a "propellant crossfeed" capability, whereby the center core engines would be supplied with fuel and oxidizer from the two side cores until their separation. This approach had previously been proposed by Vladimir Chelomei for the UR-700 launch system. Operating all engines at full thrust from launch, with fuel supplied mainly from the side boosters, would deplete the side boosters sooner, allowing their earlier separation to reduce the mass being accelerated. This would leave most of the center core propellant available after booster separation.

Musk stated in 2016 that crossfeed would not be implemented. Instead, the center booster throttles down shortly after liftoff to conserve fuel, and resumes full thrust after the side boosters have separated.

== Launch prices ==
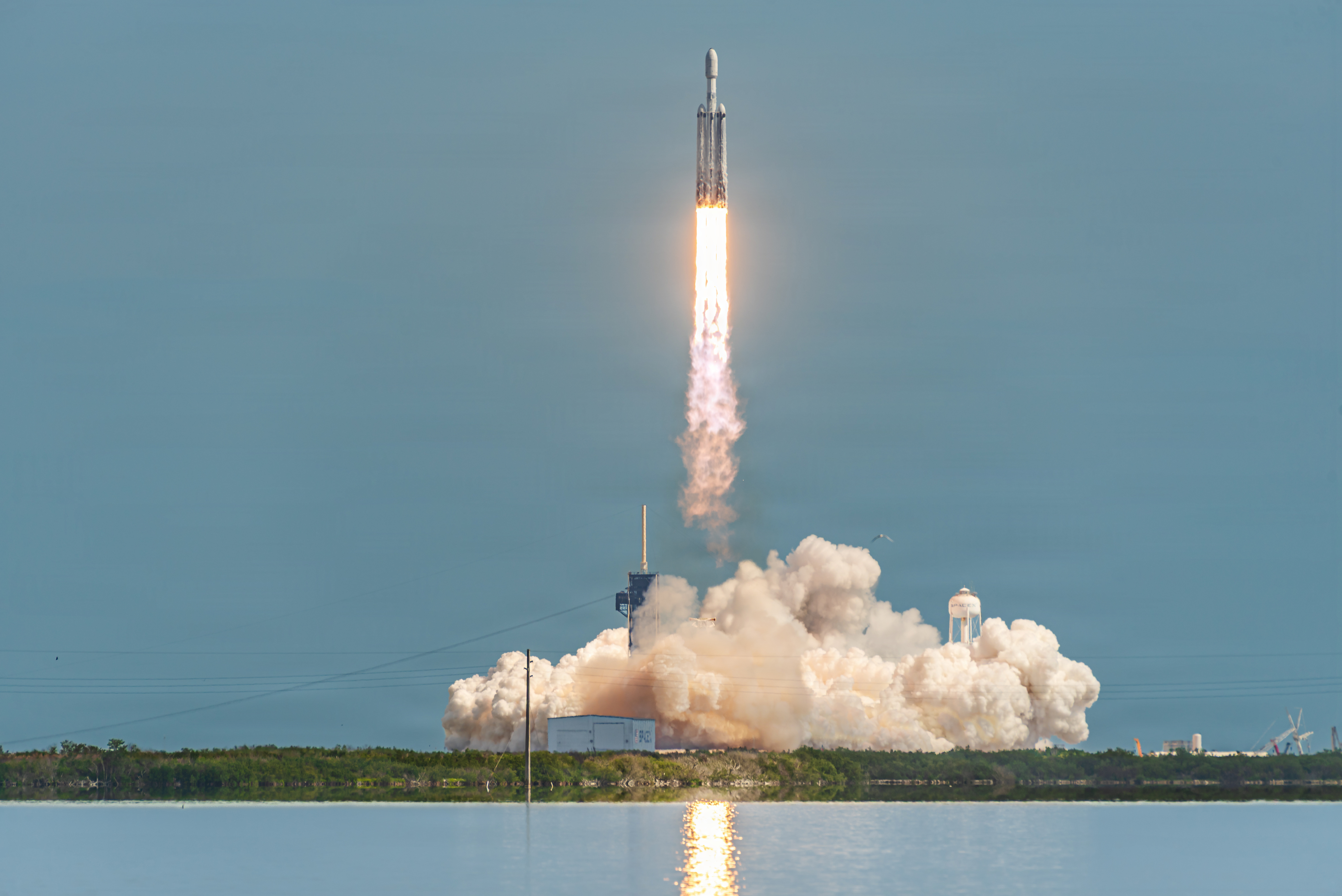
A Falcon Heavy launching an ViaSat-3 from LC-39A in 2026.

At an appearance in May 2004 before the United States Senate Committee on Commerce, Science, and Transportation, Musk testified, "Long term plans call for development of a heavy lift product and even a super-heavy, if there is customer demand. We expect that each size increase would result in a meaningful decrease in cost per pound to orbit. ... Ultimately, I believe US$500 per pound or less is very achievable". This US$500 per pound ($1,100/kg ($500/lb)) goal stated by Musk in 2004 is 35% of the cost of the lowest-cost-per-pound LEO-capable launch system in a 2001 study: the Zenit, a medium-lift launch vehicle that could carry 14 t (31,000 lb) into LEO for US$35–50 million. In 2011, SpaceX stated that the cost of reaching low Earth orbit could be as low as $2,200/kg ($1,000/lb) if an annual rate of four launches can be sustained, and as of 2011 planned to eventually launch as many as 10 Falcon Heavies and 10 Falcon 9s annually.

The published prices for Falcon Heavy launches have changed as development progressed, with announced prices for the various versions of Falcon Heavy priced at US$80–125 million in 2011, US$83–128 million in 2012, US$77–135 million in 2013, US$85 million for up to 6.4 t (14,000 lb) to GTO in 2014, US$90 million for up to 8 t (18,000 lb) to GTO in 2016.

From 2017 to early 2022, the price has been stated at US$150 million for 63.8 t (141,000 lb) to LEO or 26.7 t (59,000 lb) to GTO (fully expendable). This equates to a price of US$2,350 per kg to LEO and US$5,620 per kg to GTO. In 2022, the published price for a reusable launch was $97 million. In 2022 NASA contracted with SpaceX to launch the Nancy Grace Roman Space Telescope on a Falcon Heavy for approximately $255 million, including launch service and other mission related costs.

The nearest competing U.S. rocket was United Launch Alliance's Delta IV Heavy with a LEO payload capacity of 28.4 t (63,000 lb), could cost more than US$400 million per launch. The Delta IV Heavy was retired in 2024.

Competitors from 2024 onwards may include Blue Origin's New Glenn (45 t to LEO), Relativity Space's Terran R (34 t to LEO), and United Launch Alliance (ULA) Vulcan Centaur (27 t to LEO). SpaceX's own Starship (100+ t to LEO) flew its first commercial mission in September 2026.

== Launches and payloads ==
Due to improvements to the performance of Falcon 9, some of the heavier satellites flown to GTO, such as Intelsat 35e and Inmarsat-5 F4, were launched before the debut of Falcon Heavy. SpaceX anticipated the first commercial Falcon Heavy launch would be three to six months after a successful maiden flight, but due to delays, the first commercial payload, Arabsat-6A was successfully launched on April 11, 2019, a year and two months after the first flight. SpaceX hoped to have 10 launches every year from 2021 on, but there were no launches in 2020, 2021 or 2025.

Flight No.	Launch date (UTC)	Launch site	Payload	Payload mass	Orbit	Customer	Price	Outcome
1	February 6, 2018; 20:45	Kennedy, LC-39A	Elon Musk's Tesla Roadster	~1,250 kg (2,760 lb)	Heliocentric	SpaceX	Internal	Success
1	First demonstration flight launched a Tesla Roadster to a trans-Mars injection heliocentric orbit. Both side boosters returned to the launch site and made simultaneous landings; the center core failed to fully relight on landing and crashed into the water adjacent to the droneship, resulting in damage to the vessel's thrusters.							
2	April 11, 2019; 22:35	Kennedy, LC-39A	Arabsat-6A	6,465 kg (14,253 lb)	GTO	Arabsat	Undisclosed	Success
2	Heavy communications satellite purchased by the Arab League. All three boosters landed successfully but the center core subsequently fell over and was lost during transport due to heavy seas. The two side-boosters were reused on the STP-2 launch.							
3	June 25, 2019; 06:30	Kennedy, LC-39A	USAF STP-2	3,700 kg (8,200 lb)	LEO / MEO	United States Department of Defense	US$160.9 million	Success
3	The mission supported the U.S. Air Force National Security Space Launch (formerly EELV) certification process for the Falcon Heavy. The original contract price was US$165 million, which was later reduced due to the Air Force agreeing to the use of reused side boosters. Secondary payloads include orbiters: LightSail 2, GPIM, OTB (hosting the Deep Space Atomic Clock,) six COSMIC-2 (FORMOSAT-7), Oculus-ASR, Prox-1, and ISAT. Successfully reused the boosters from the second Falcon Heavy flight. Center core failed to land on the droneship and was lost.							
4	November 1, 2022; 13:41	Kennedy, LC-39A	USSF-44	~3,750 kg (8,270 lb)	GEO	U.S. Space Force, Millennium Space Systems and Lockheed Martin Space	~US$130 million (Note: from a US$297 million contract including two Falcon 9s)	Success
4	First classified flight of Falcon Heavy. The contract was awarded to SpaceX for a price of under 30% of that of a typical Delta IV Heavy launch (US$440 million). Payload included two separate satellites and at least three additional rideshare payloads (including TETRA-1) and weighed roughly 3.7 t (8,200 lb) at launch. They were launched in a direct geosynchronous orbit, necessitating for the first time a planned partially expendable launch, that is, to deliberately expend the center core which was configured without grid fins and landing gear needed for a landing, while the two side-boosters landed at Cape Canaveral Space Force Station. It was originally scheduled for Q1 2022, but it was delayed due to payload issues to November 1, 2022. The second stage was fitted with a long mission‑extension kit for a long coast phase between second‑stage ignitions. As part of the kit, the stage includes a gray band painted on the metal skin over the RP‑1 tank, which absorbs sunlight and helps prevent the propellant from freezing during the coast.							
5	January 15, 2023; 22:56	Kennedy, LC-39A	USSF-67	~3,750 kg (8,270 lb)	GEO	U.S. Space Force	US$317 million (includes new infrastructure)	Success
5	Second classified flight of Falcon Heavy, using a new center core in an expendable configuration (no grid fins or landing gear), while the two boosters were reused side-boosters that landed at Cape Canaveral Space Force Station. The second stage was fitted with a long mission‑extension kit. As part of the kit, the stage includes a gray band painted on the metal skin over the RP‑1 tank, which absorbs sunlight and helps prevent the propellant from freezing during the coast.							
6	May 1, 2023; 00:26	Kennedy, LC-39A	ViaSat-3 F1	6,400 kg (14,100 lb)	GEO	ViaSat	Undisclosed	Success
6	May 1, 2023; 00:26	Kennedy, LC-39A	Aurora 4A (Arcturus)	300 kg (660 lb)	GEO	Astranis / Pacific Dataport	Undisclosed	Success
6	May 1, 2023; 00:26	Kennedy, LC-39A	GS-1	22 kg (49 lb)	GEO	Gravity Space	Undisclosed	Success
6	Falcon Heavy was originally slated to launch the Viasat-2 satellite, but due to delays an Ariane 5 launch vehicle was used. Viasat maintained the launch option and delivered its next Ka-band satellite aboard the Falcon Heavy – this one intended to provide service to the Americas region. Astranis' microGEO satellite Arcturus was manifested in late September 2021. Following a series of MVac engine burns and long periods of coasting, the upper stage of Falcon Heavy deployed the satellite into a near-geosynchronous orbit at approximately T+4:32:27. The upper stage went on to successfully deploy the additional payloads, G-Space 1 and Arcturus. This mission was the sixth Falcon‑family launch to use a second stage equipped with the long mission‑extension kit, required for a long coast phase between second‑stage ignitions. As part of the kit, the stage includes a gray band painted on the metal skin over the RP‑1 tank, which absorbs sunlight and helps prevent the propellant from freezing during the coast. This was the first fully expendable mission for Falcon Heavy since its introduction, the center core and side boosters were configured without landing legs or grid fins.							
7	July 29, 2023; 03:04	Kennedy, LC-39A	Jupiter-3 (EchoStar-24)	~9,200 kg (20,300 lb)	GTO	EchoStar	Undisclosed	Success
7	Heaviest commercial geostationary satellite weighing 9,200 kg (20,300 lb) at launch. The second stage had a gray band for the same reason as on the USSF-44 flight, but this time it was configured for medium coast phase. Core expended, two boosters recovered to land. Payload fairing recovery attempted.							
8	October 13, 2023; 14:19	Kennedy, LC-39A	Psyche	~2,608 kg (5,750 lb)	Heliocentric	NASA	US$117 million	Success
8	Falcon Heavy launched the 2.6 t (5,700 lb) Psyche orbiter mission into a heliocentric orbit. From there, the Psyche spacecraft will visit the Psyche asteroid in the main asteroid belt. Core expended, two boosters recovered to land. No gray band on second stage as the flight plan did not include long coast phases.							
9	December 29, 2023; 01:07	Kennedy, LC-39A	USSF-52 (Boeing X-37B OTV-7)	~6,350 kg (14,000 lb) + OTV payload	HEO	Department of the Air Force Rapid Capabilities Office/U.S. Space Force	US$149 million	Success
9	Third classified flight of Falcon Heavy, awarded in June 2018. This mission was the fourth flight of the second X-37B vehicle and the seventh overall flight in the X-37B program, as well as the first X-37B flight to a highly elliptical high Earth orbit. It was intended to include NASA's Seeds-2 experiment investigating the effects of space-based radiation on plant seeds during a long-duration spaceflight. The center core expended and the two boosters were recovered to land.							
10	June 25, 2024; 21:26	Kennedy, LC-39A	GOES-19	5,000 kg (11,000 lb)	GTO	NOAA	US$152.5 million	Success
10	In September 2021, NASA awarded SpaceX a launch services contract for the geostationary GOES-19 weather satellite (known as GOES-U during launch). All three Falcon 9 boosters were new. Both side boosters landed at Landing Zones 1 and 2 while the center core was expended. This mission was the fourth Falcon‑family launch to use a second stage with the medium mission‑extension kit for a longer coast between ignitions. Modifications include a gray band painted on the metal skin over the RP‑1 tank that absorbs sunlight to prevent propellant freezing.							
11	October 14, 2024; 16:06	Kennedy, LC-39A	Europa Clipper	6,065 kg (13,371 lb)	Heliocentric	NASA	US$178 million	Success
11	Europa Clipper is to conduct a detailed survey of Europa and use a sophisticated suite of science instruments to investigate whether the icy moon has conditions suitable for life. Key mission objectives are to produce high-resolution images of Europa's surface, determine its composition, look for signs of recent or ongoing geological activity, measure the thickness of the moon's icy shell, search for subsurface lakes, and determine the depth and salinity of Europa's ocean. The mission makes flybys of Mars and Earth before arriving at Jupiter in April 2030. The Falcon Heavy for this mission was fully expendable as both the side boosters and core were expended (and configured without landing legs and grid fins). This was the second fully expendable Falcon Heavy mission after Viasat-3 F1 in May 2023.							
12	April 29, 2026; 14:13	Kennedy, LC-39A	ViaSat-3 F3	6,400 kg (14,100 lb)	GTO	ViaSat	Undisclosed	Success
12	Ka-band satellite for the APAC region. The mission switched to Falcon Heavy due to delays with Ariane 6. The center core was expended, while both side boosters were recovered. Boosters B1072 and B1075 flew as the side cores. B1075 had previously flown 21 Falcon 9 missions from Vandenberg before being converted into a side booster for this launch. It landed at LZ-40, becoming the first Falcon Heavy side booster to touch down at the pad. This mission was the eighth Falcon‑family launch to use a second stage equipped with the medium mission‑extension kit, required for a longer coast phase between second‑stage ignitions. As part of the kit, the stage includes a gray band painted on the metal skin over the RP‑1 tank, which absorbs sunlight and helps prevent the propellant from freezing during the coast.							
13	August 30, 2026; 11:26	Kennedy, LC-39A	Nancy Grace Roman Space Telescope	9,174 kg (20,225 lb)	Sun–Earth L_{2}	NASA (LSP)	US$255 million	Success
13	NASA space observatory designed to investigate dark energy, search for exoplanets, and conduct wide-field infrared astrophysics from the Sun–Earth L_{2} point. Featuring a 2.4-meter (7.9 ft) aperture with a field of view 100 times larger than the Hubble Space Telescope, the mission also serves as a technology demonstrator for advanced coronagraphic imaging. The Falcon Heavy center core was expended, while both side boosters were successfully recovered with simultaneous landings at Landing Zone 2 and Landing Zone 40 at Cape Canaveral Space Force Station.							
14	October 2, 2026; 03:54	Kennedy	NROL-97	Undisclosed	Undisclosed	NRO	Undisclosed	Success
14	This marked the first National Reconnaissance Office (NRO) mission launched aboard a Falcon Heavy rocket. Details about the U.S. reconnaissance satellites and their capabilities remain classified.							

=== Future launches ===
Date	Payload	Customer	Price
November 2026	Griffin Mission One	Astrobotic / NASA	
Astrobotic's Griffin Mission One is a lunar lander contracted by NASA as part of the Commercial Lunar Payload Services program. The lander, the company's second after Peregrine Mission One, is expected to land in a region of interest in the Moon's south polar region with scientific payloads attached.
2027	Griffin Mission Two	Astrobotic	
Astrobotic's third lunar lander mission (second Griffin lander).
2027	NROL-86	NRO	
Classified mission for the National Reconnaissance Office.
2027	USSF-63	USSF	
Classified mission for the United States Space Force.
2027	USSF-75	USSF	
Classified mission for the United States Space Force.
2027	USSF-155	USSF	
Classified mission for the United States Space Force.
2027	USSF-174	USSF	
Classified mission for the United States Space Force.
2027	USSF-186	USSF	
Classified mission for the United States Space Force.
2027	USSF-206 (WGS-12)	USSF	
Wideband Global SATCOM satellite.
July 5, 2028	Dragonfly	NASA	US$256.6 million
Rotorcraft mission to Saturn's moon Titan. Awarded on November 25, 2024. The launch will cost NASA $256.6 million. First Falcon mission to carry an RTG.
October 2028	Rosalind Franklin	ESA/NASA	
European Mars rover. The first Falcon mission targeting the surface of Mars (as of April 2026).
TBA	TBA	Intelsat	
This was the first commercial agreement of a Falcon Heavy, and was signed in May 2012. In 2018, the contract option was still maintained but no definitive payload had been chosen.

=== First commercial contracts ===
In May 2012, SpaceX announced that Intelsat had signed the first commercial contract for a Falcon Heavy flight. It was not confirmed at the time when the first Intelsat launch would occur, but the agreement had SpaceX delivering satellites to geosynchronous transfer orbit (GTO). In August 2016, it emerged that this Intelsat contract had been reassigned to a Falcon 9 Full Thrust mission to deliver Intelsat 35e into orbit in the third quarter of 2017. Performance improvements of the Falcon 9 vehicle family since the 2012 announcement, advertising 8.3 t (18,000 lb) to GTO for its expendable flight profile, enabled the launch of this 6 t satellite without upgrading to a Falcon Heavy variant.

In 2014, Inmarsat booked three launches with Falcon Heavy, but due to delays, switched a payload to Ariane 5 for 2017. Similarly to the Intelsat 35e case, another satellite from this contract, Inmarsat 5-F4, was switched to a Falcon 9 Full Thrust due to the increased liftoff capacity. The remaining contract covered the launch of Inmarsat-6 F1 in 2020 on a Falcon 9.

=== Department of Defense contracts ===
In December 2012, SpaceX announced its first Falcon Heavy launch contract with the United States Department of Defense (DoD). The United States Air Force Space and Missile Systems Center awarded SpaceX two Evolved Expendable Launch Vehicle (EELV)-class missions, including the Space Test Program 2 (STP-2) mission for Falcon Heavy, originally scheduled to be launched in March 2017, to be placed at a near circular orbit at an altitude of 700 km (430 mi), with an inclination of 70.0°.

In April 2015, SpaceX sent the U.S. Air Force an updated letter of intent outlining a certification process for its Falcon Heavy rocket to launch national security satellites. The process included three successful flights of the Falcon Heavy including two consecutive successful flights, and the letter stated that Falcon Heavy can be ready to fly national security payloads by 2017. But in July 2017, SpaceX announced that the first test flight would take place in December 2017, pushing the second launch (Space Test Program 2) to June 2018. In May 2018, on the occasion of the first launch of the Falcon 9 Block 5 variant, a further delay to October 2018 was announced, and the launch was eventually pushed to June 25, 2019. The STP-2 mission used three Block 5 cores.

SpaceX was awarded 40% of the launches in Phase 2 of the National Security Space Launch (NSSL) contracts, which includes several launches, a vertical integration facility, and development of a larger fairing, from 2024 to 2027.

==== Space Test Program 2 (STP-2) mission ====
The payload for the STP-2 mission of the Department of Defense included 25 small spacecraft from the U.S. military, NASA, and research institutions:

The Green Propellant Infusion Mission (GPIM) was a payload; it is a project partly developed by the U.S. Air Force to demonstrate a less-toxic propellant.

Another secondary payload is the miniaturized Deep Space Atomic Clock that is expected to facilitate autonomous navigation. The U.S. Air Force Research Laboratory's Demonstration and Science Experiments (DSX) has a mass of 500 kg (1,100 lb) and will measure the effects of very low frequency radio waves on space radiation. The British 'Orbital Test Bed' payload is hosting several commercial and military experiments.

Other small satellites included Prox 1, built by Georgia Tech students to test a 3D-printed thruster and a miniaturized gyroscope, LightSail by The Planetary Society, Oculus-ASR nanosatellite from Michigan Tech, and CubeSats from the U.S. Air Force Academy, the Naval Postgraduate School, the United States Naval Research Laboratory, the University of Texas at Austin, California Polytechnic State University, and a CubeSat assembled by students at Merritt Island High School in Florida.

The Block 5-second stage allowed multiple reignitions to place its many payloads in multiple orbits. The launch was planned to include a 5 t (11,000 lb) ballast mass, but the ballast mass was later omitted from the 3.7 t (8,200 lb) total mass for the payload stack.

=== NASA contracts ===
==== Solar System transport missions ====
In 2011, NASA Ames Research Center proposed a Mars mission called Red Dragon that would use a Falcon Heavy as the launch vehicle and trans-Martian injection vehicle, and a variant of the Dragon capsule to enter the Martian atmosphere. The proposed science objectives were to detect biosignatures and to drill approximately 1 m (3.3 ft) underground, in an effort to sample reservoirs of water ice known to exist under the surface. The mission cost as of 2011 was projected to be less than US$425 million, not including the launch cost. SpaceX 2015 estimation was 2,000–4,000 kg (4,400–8,800 lb) to the surface of Mars, with a soft retropropulsive landing following a limited atmospheric deceleration using a parachute and heat shield. Beyond the Red Dragon concept, SpaceX was seeing potential for Falcon Heavy and Dragon 2 to carry science payloads across much of the Solar System, particularly to Jupiter's moon Europa. However, SpaceX announced in 2017 that propulsive landing for Dragon 2 would not be developed further, and that the capsule would not receive landing legs. Consequently, the Red Dragon missions to Mars were canceled in favor of Starship, a larger vehicle using a different landing technology.

==== Psyche, Europa Clipper, and Dragonfly ====
The 2024 fully-expended launch of NASA's Europa Clipper.

NASA chose Falcon Heavy as the launch vehicle for its Psyche mission to a metallic asteroid; it launched on October 13, 2023. The contract was worth US$117 million.

Europa Clipper was initially targeted to be launched on an SLS rocket. However, due to extensive delays, in 2021 NASA awarded the launch contract to SpaceX for a fully expendable Falcon Heavy. It launched on October 14, 2024.

Dragonfly, a rotorcraft mission to Saturn's moon Titan, is scheduled to launch on a Falcon Heavy in July 2028.

== Gallery ==
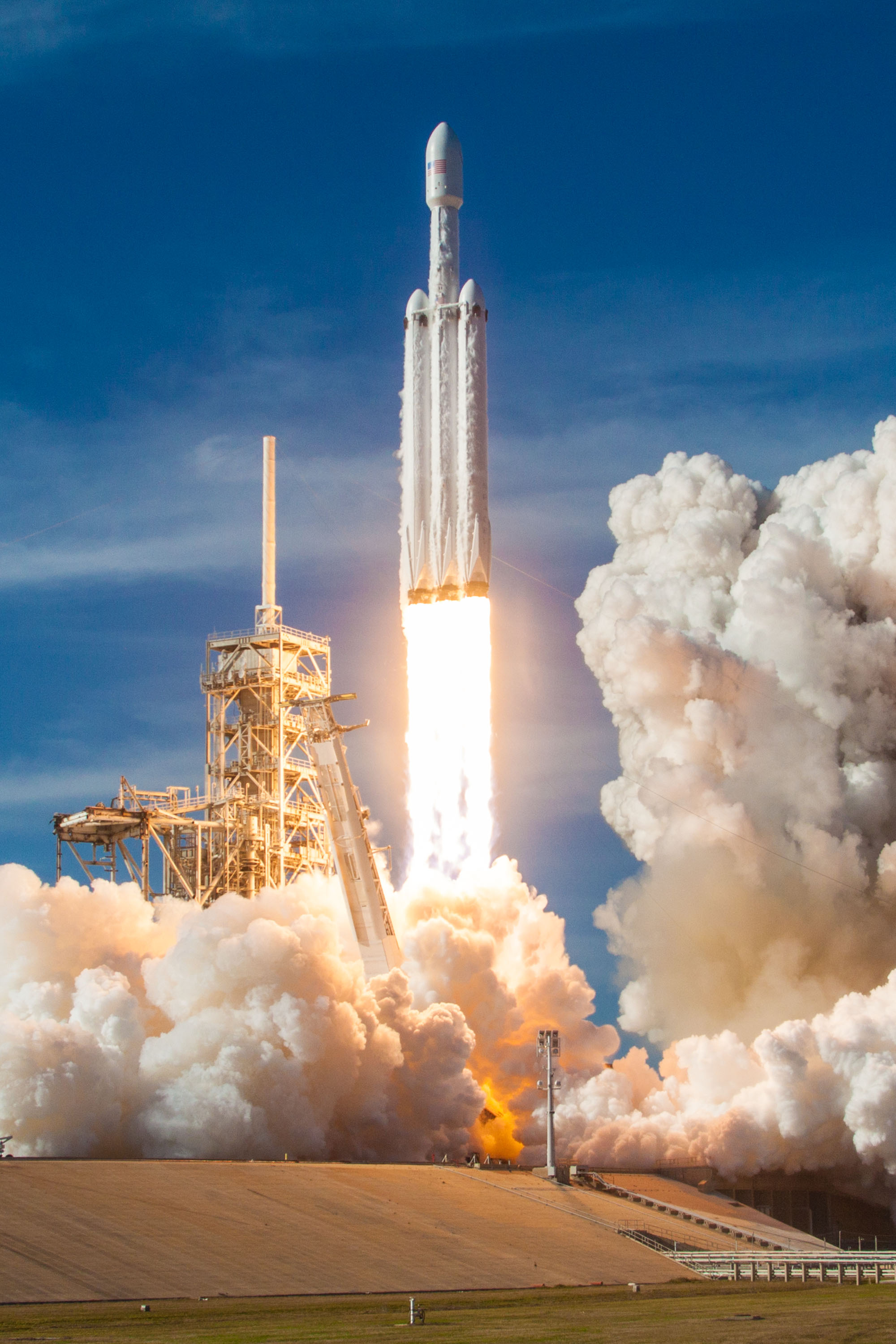
Falcon Heavy test flight launch

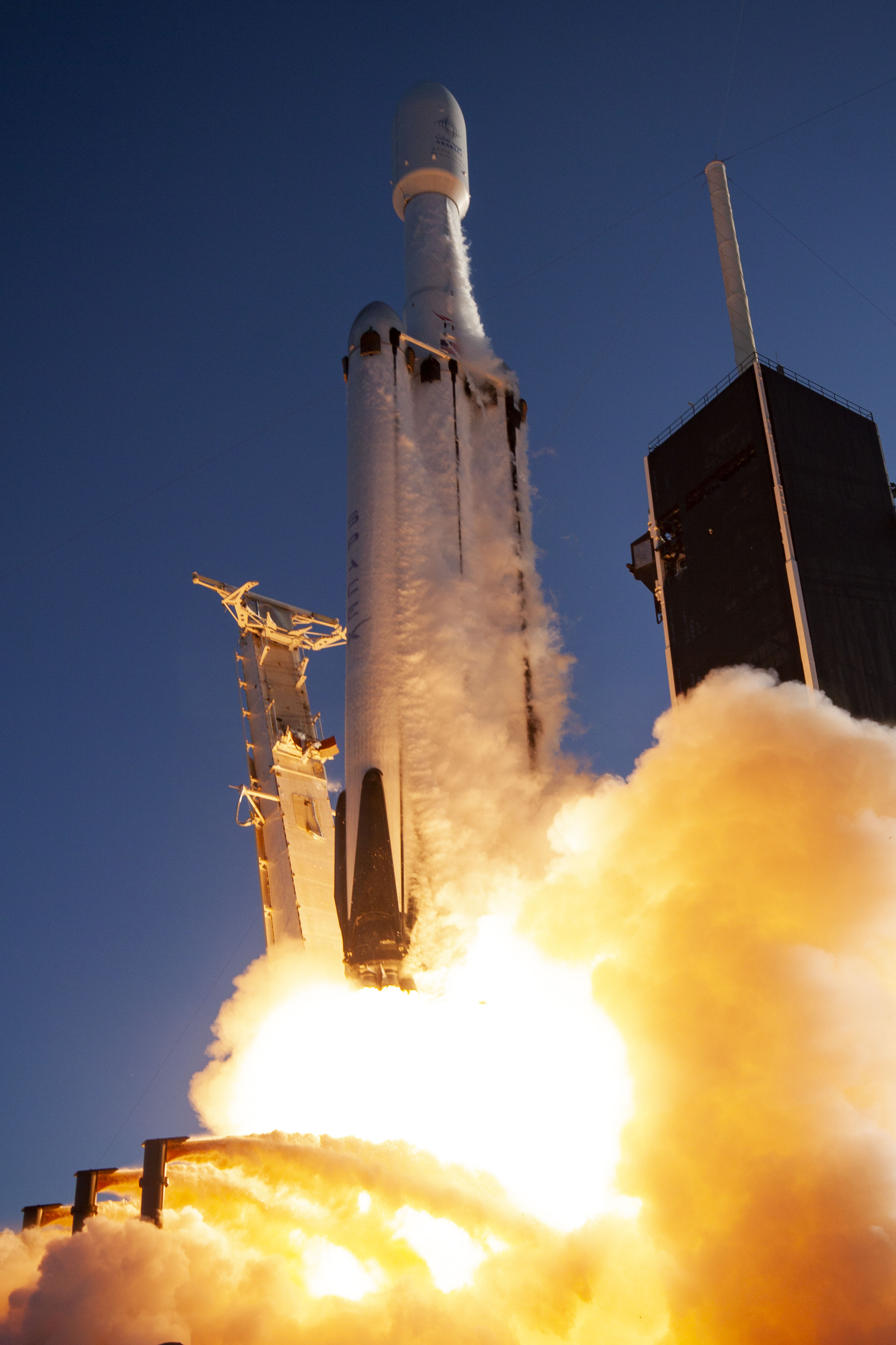
Arabsat-6A launch

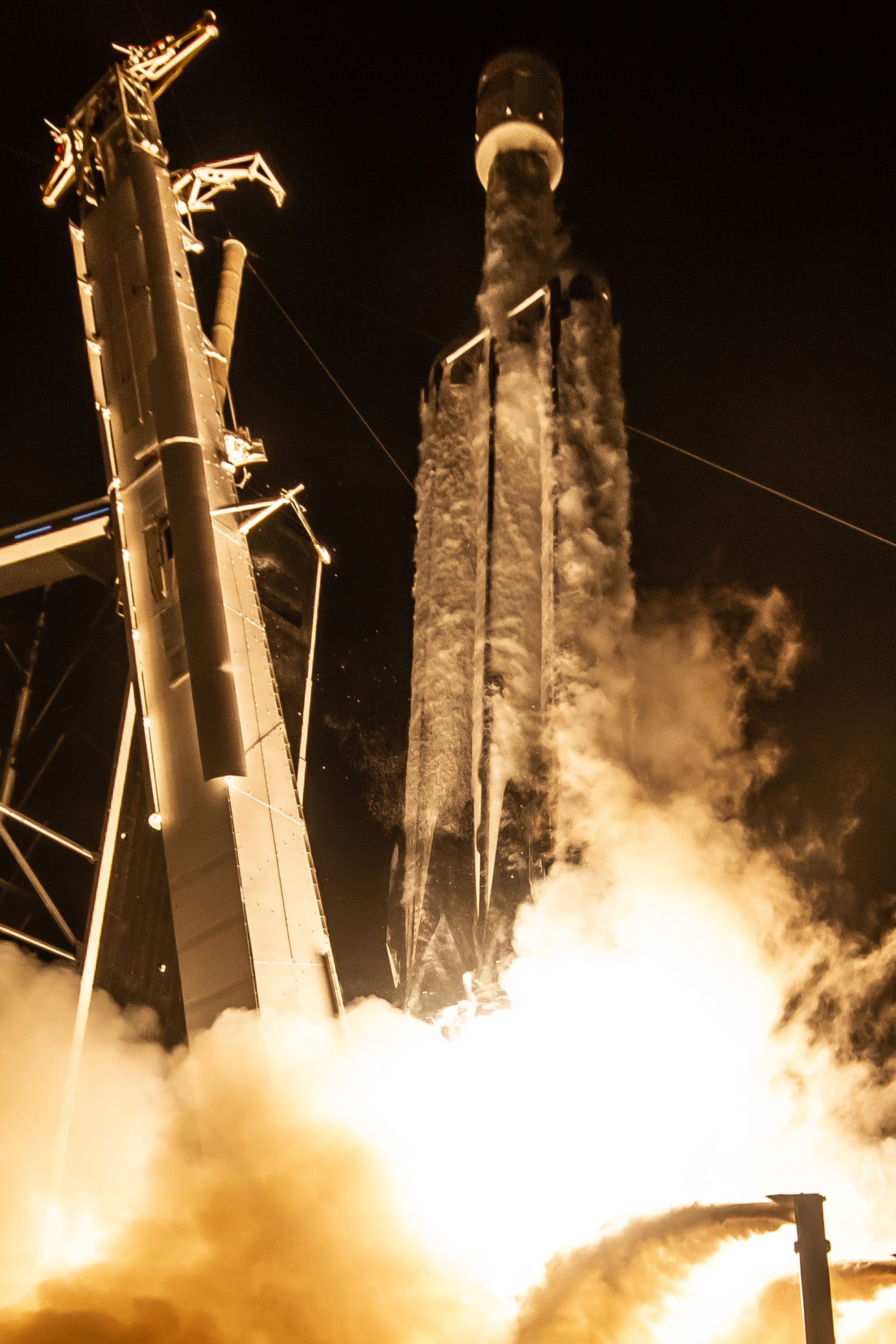
STP-2 launch

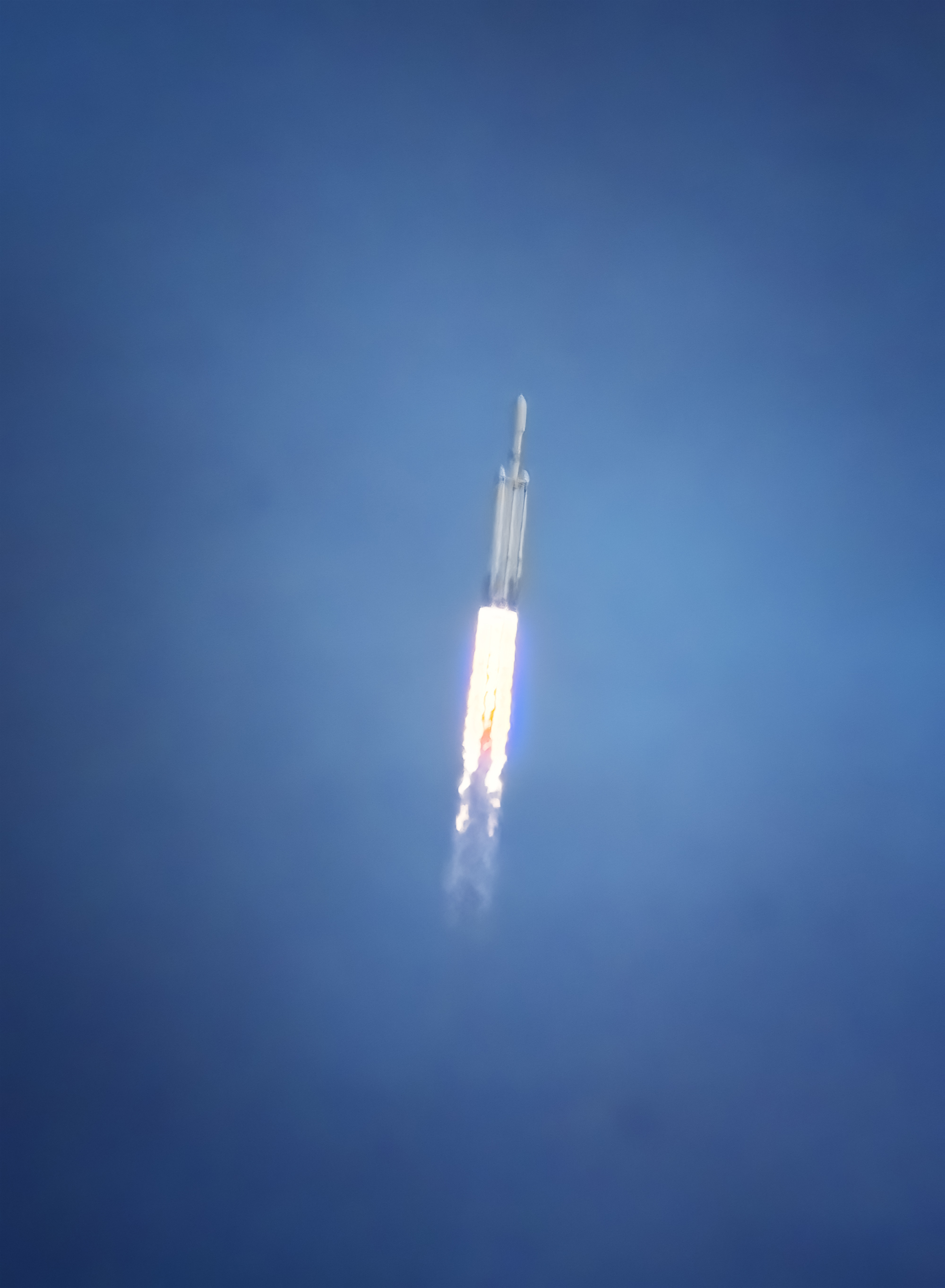
USSF-44 launch

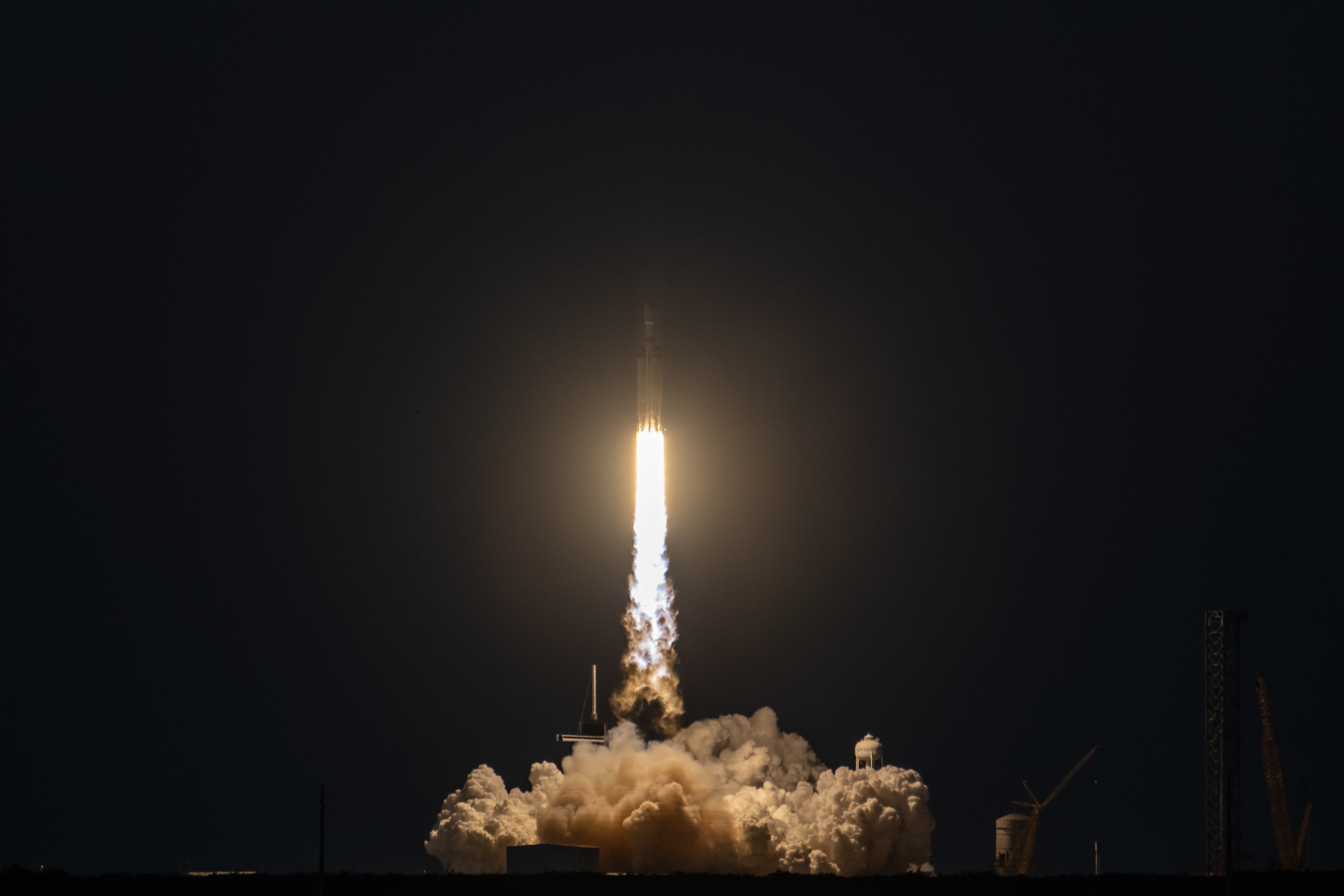
USSF-67 launch

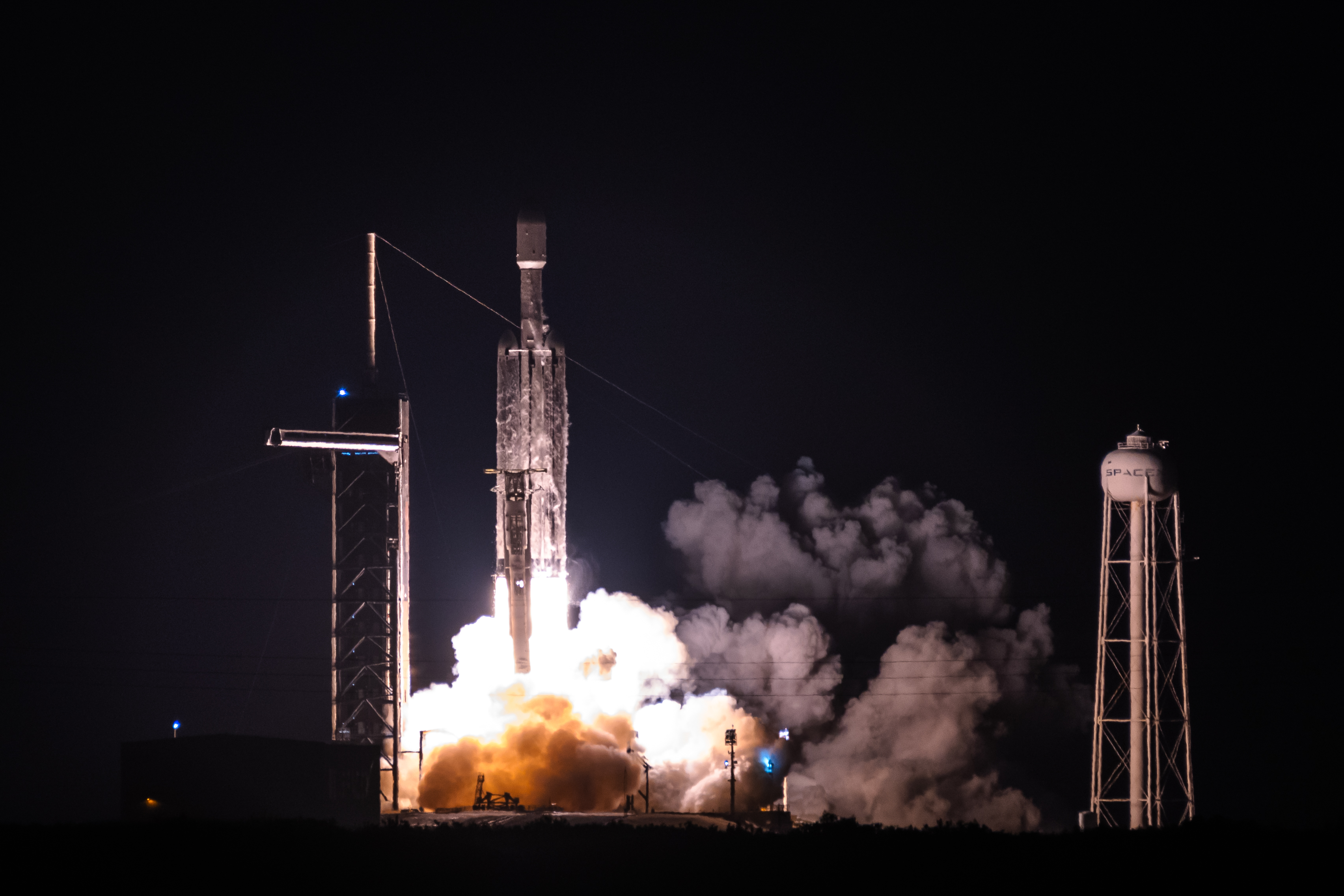
ViaSat-3 F1 launch

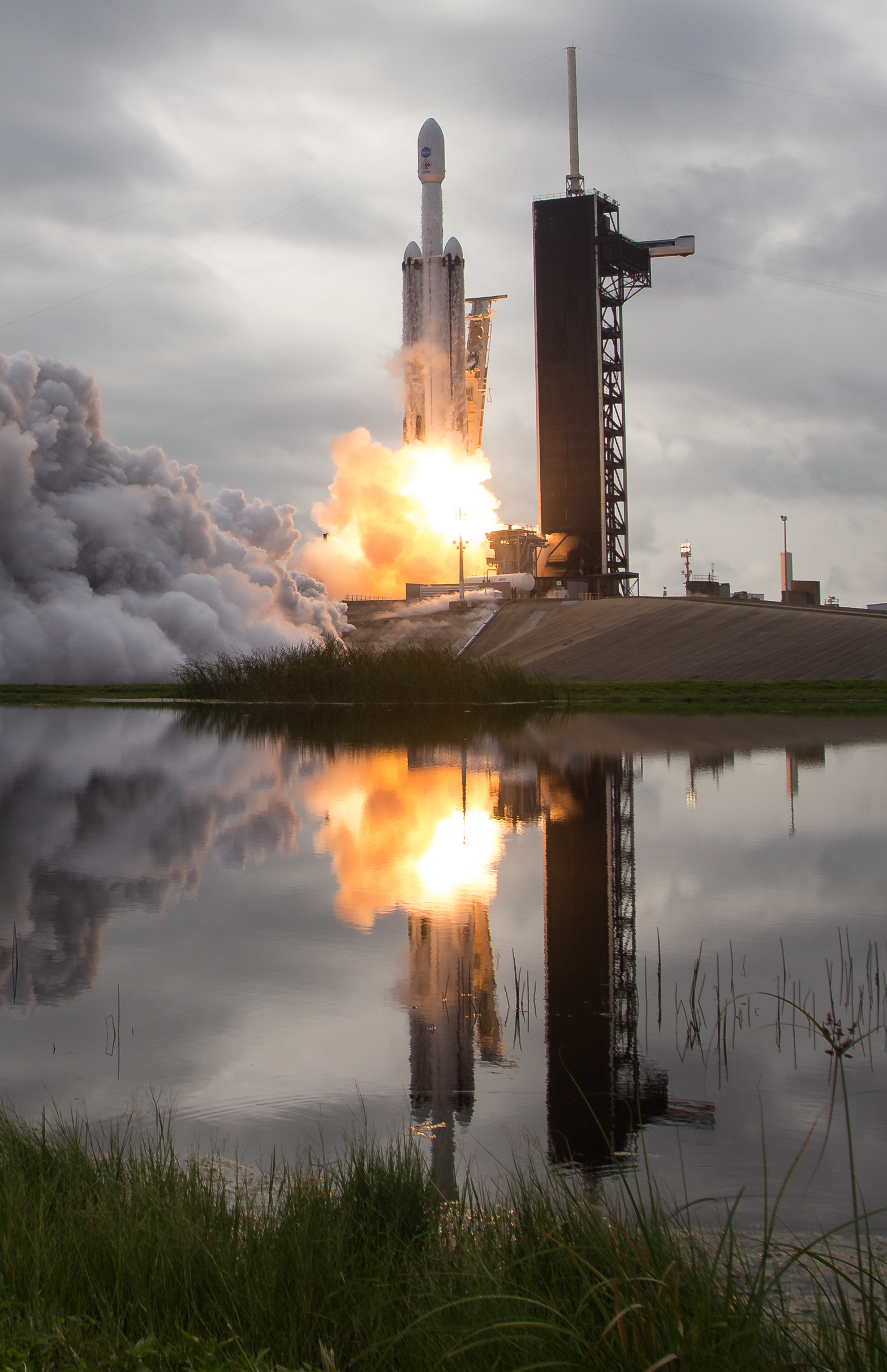
Psyche launch

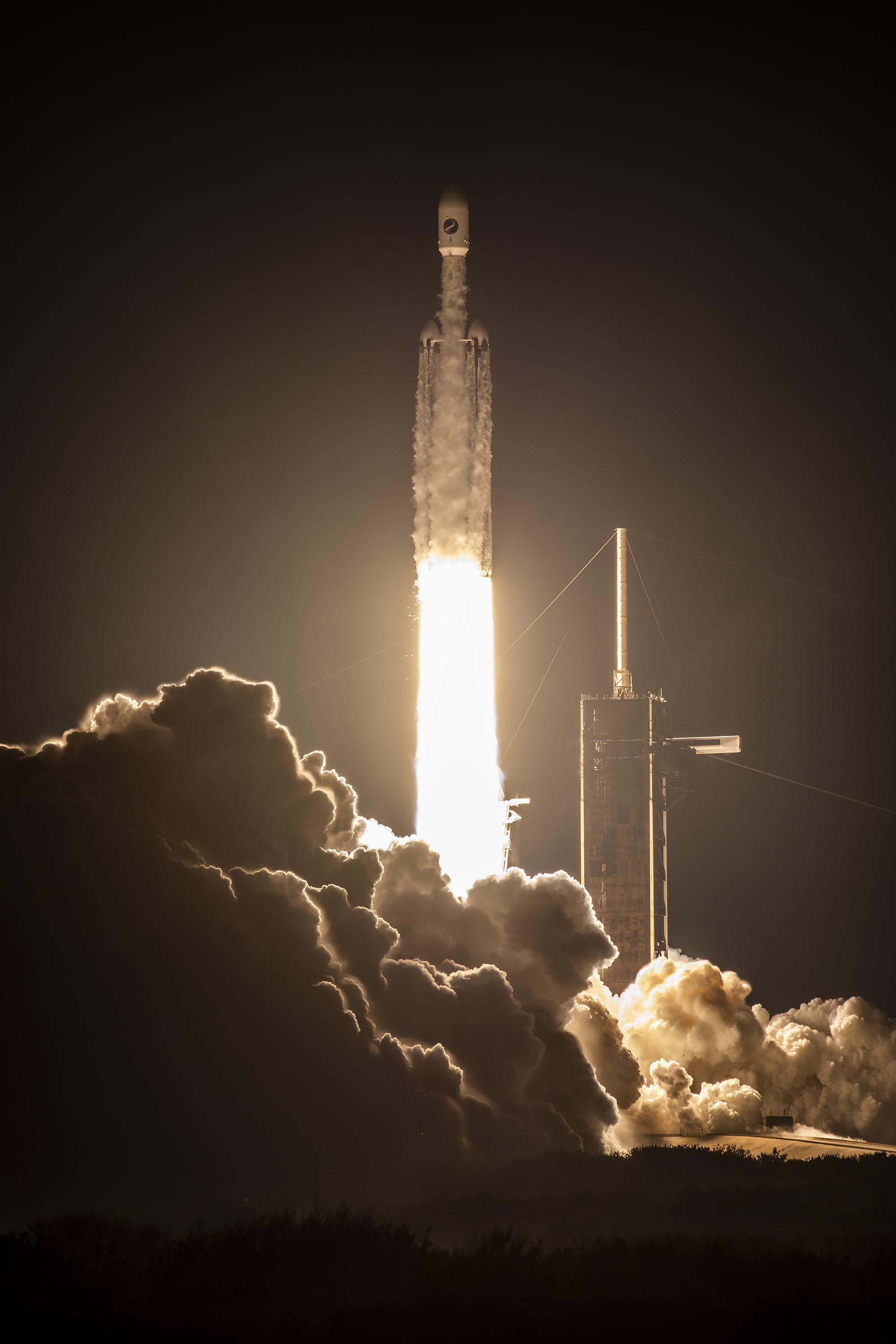
OTV-7 launch

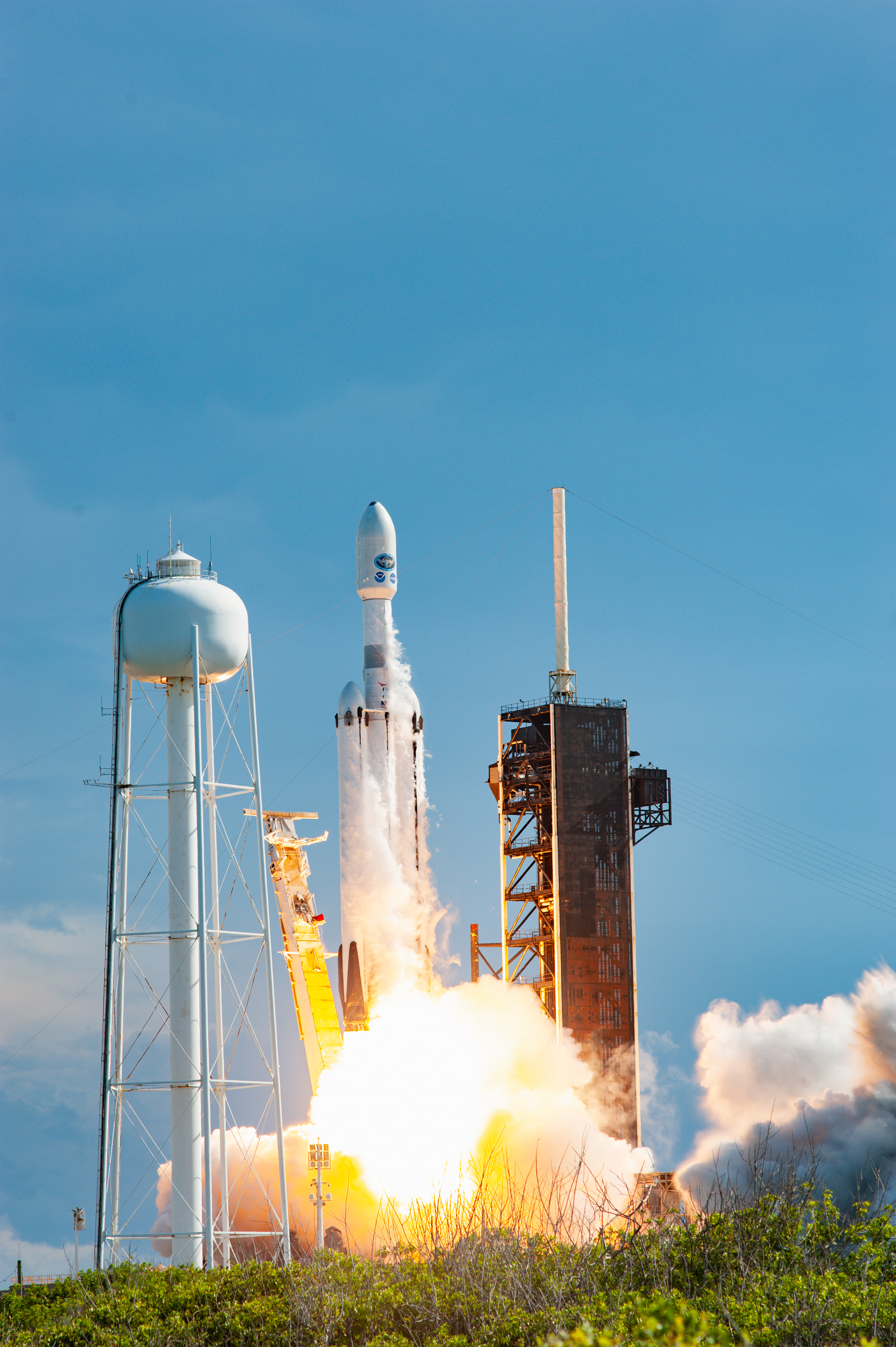
GOES-U launch

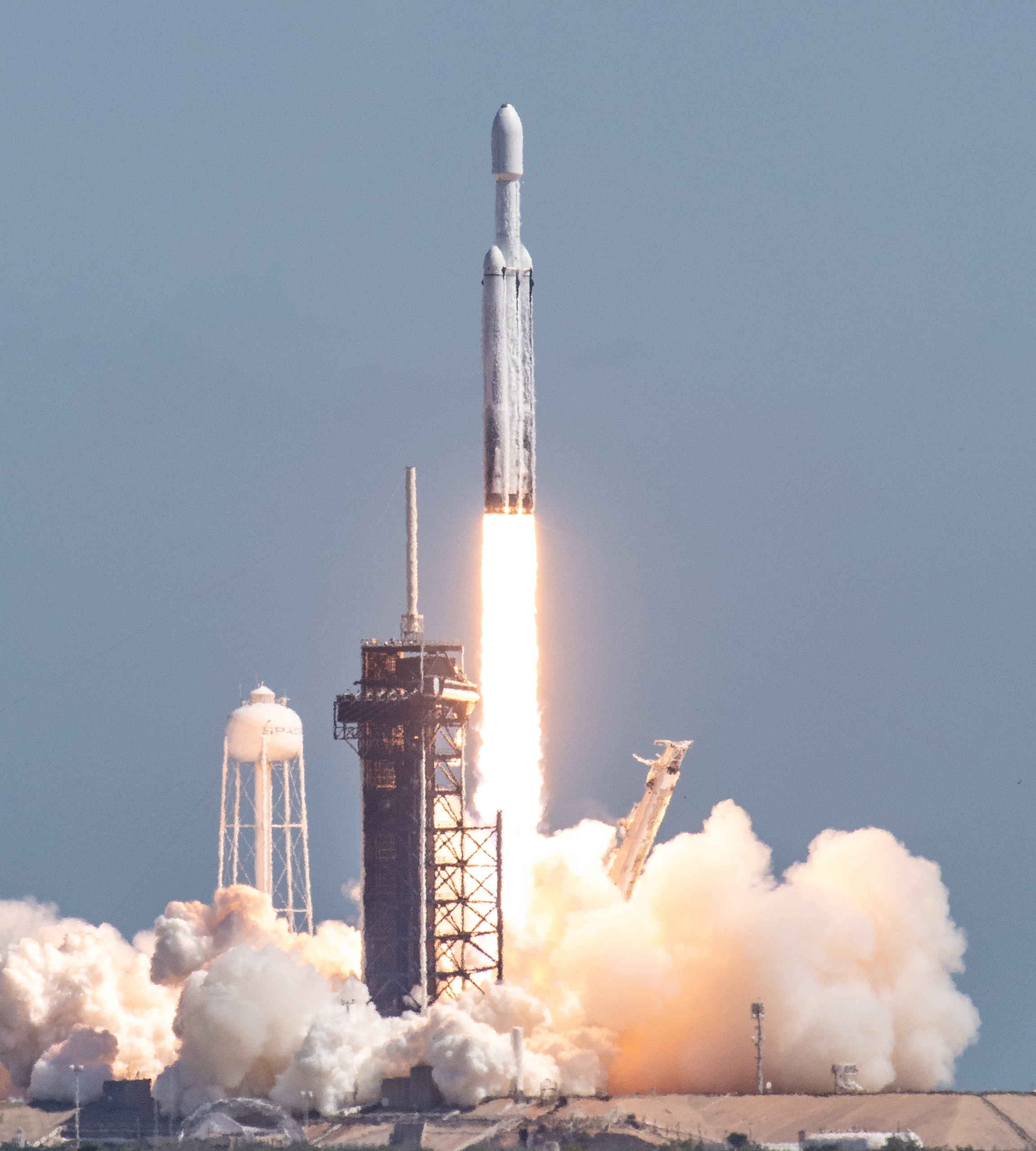
Europa Clipper launch

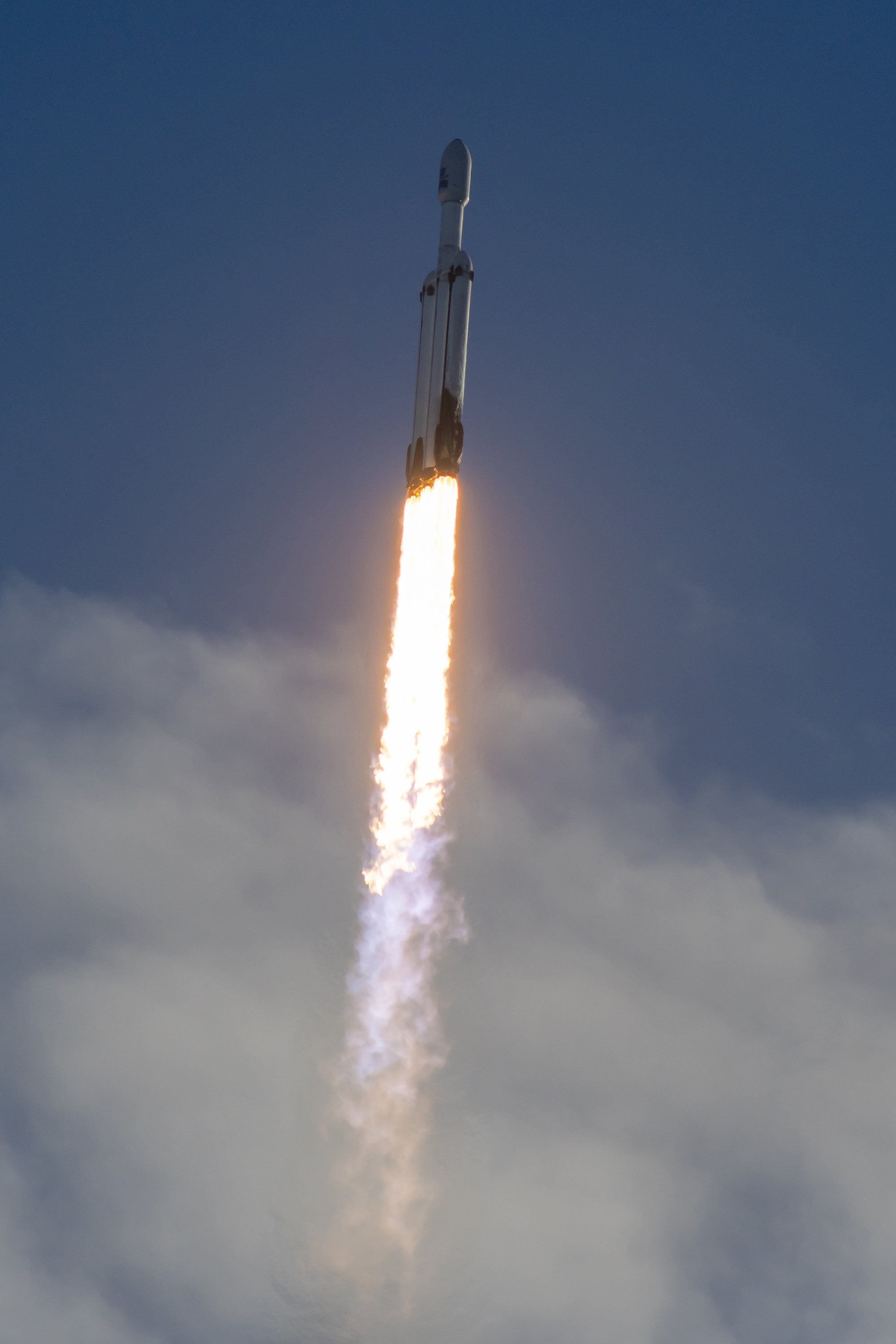
Nancy Grace Roman Space Telescope launch

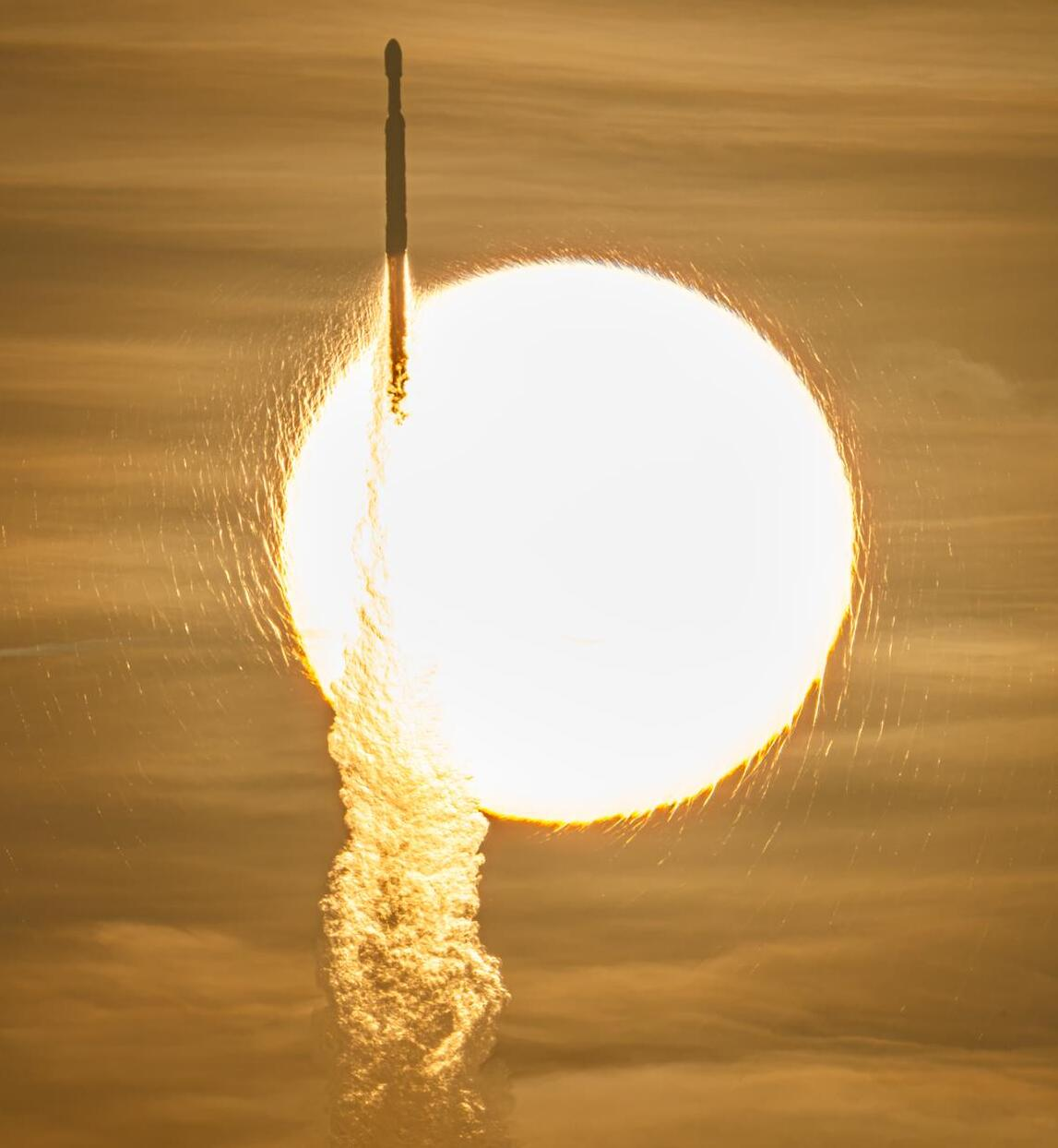
Roman Space Telescope launch transiting the Sun

== See also ==
- Comparison of orbital launch systems
- Comparison of orbital launchers families
- SpaceX Mars transportation infrastructure
- Saturn C-3
- Delta IV Heavy
