= Arabsat-6A =

Saudi Arabian communications satellite

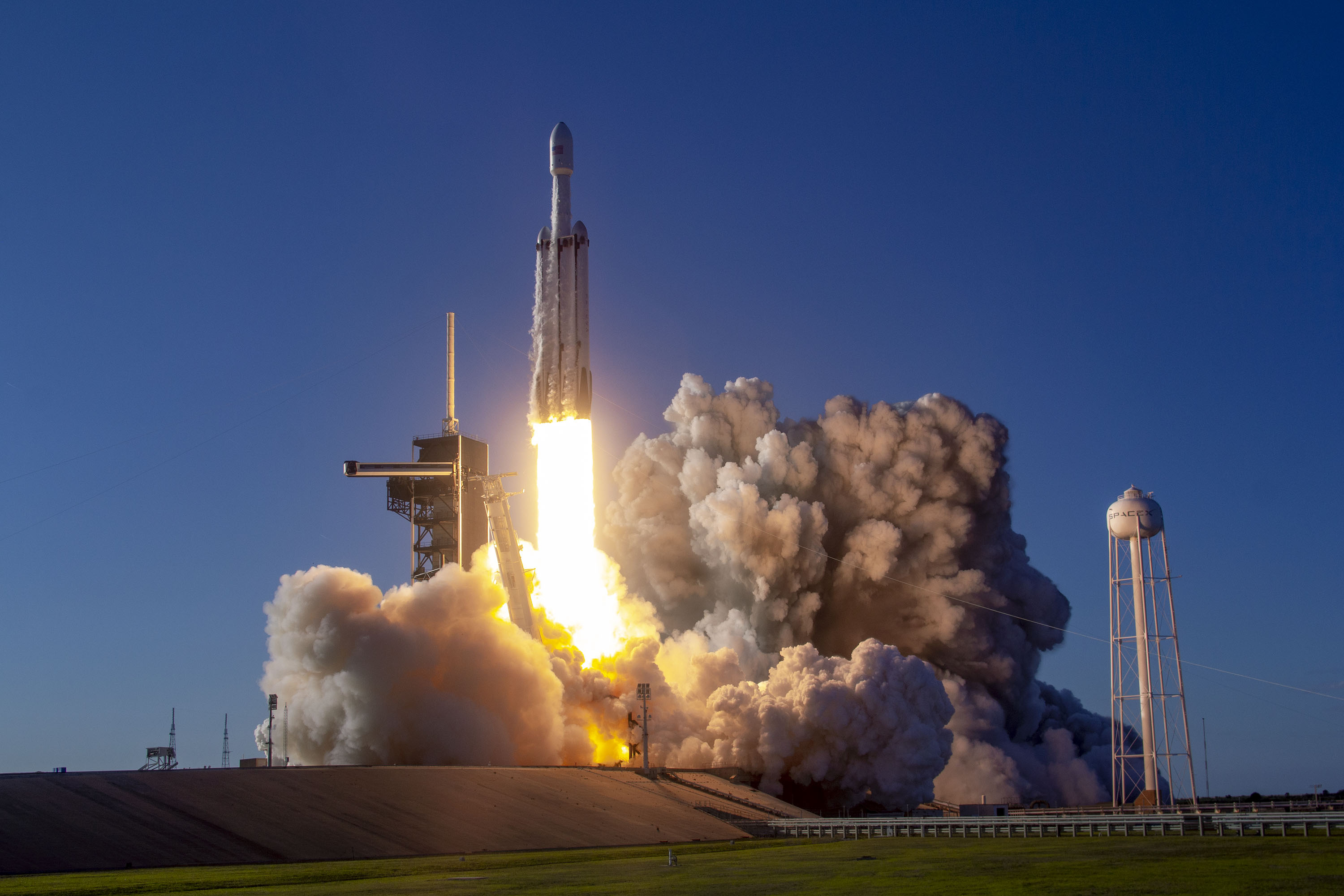
- Launch of Arabsat-6A on Falcon Heavy
- Mission type: Communications satellite
- Operator: King Abdulaziz City for Science and Technology
- COSPAR ID: 2019-021A
- SATCAT no.: 44186
- Mission duration: 7 years and 16 days (elapsed)

Spacecraft properties
- Spacecraft type: Telecomm
- Bus: A2100
- Manufacturer: Lockheed Martin
- Launch mass: 6,465 kg

Start of mission
- Launch date: April 11, 2019, 22:35 UTC
- Rocket: Falcon Heavy
- Launch site: Kennedy LC-39A
- Contractor: SpaceX

Orbital parameters
- Reference system: Geocentric
- Regime: Geostationary
- Longitude: 30.5° E
- Arabsat-6G program

Arabsat-6A is a geostationary communications satellite operated by Arabsat. The satellite was built by Lockheed Martin Space Systems on a modernized A2100 bus. The satellite was successfully launched from Kennedy Space Center LC-39A aboard Falcon Heavy on April 11, 2019.

== History ==
Arabsat-6A and SaudiGeoSat-1/HellasSat-4 are the two satellites of the Arabsat-6G program, ordered by the Arab League to supply the communications needs of member states.

Contracts to build the two satellites were awarded to Lockheed Martin Space Systems in April 2015. Arabsat ultimately awarded the launch contract for Arabsat-6A to SpaceX for a Falcon Heavy flight with no expendable boosters. The Falcon Heavy was chosen over the Falcon 9 due to its far superior thrust; the extra boost would extend the satellite's operational lifespan from 15 years to 18-20 years.

== Spacecraft ==
Arabsat 6A is based on an updated version of the A2100 bus and is considered among the most advanced communications satellites built. The spacecraft utilizes fixed and steerable Ku-band and Ka-band transponders to provide TV and radio services to the Middle East and North Africa from its station at 30.5°E.

== Launch ==
Arabsat-6A was launched aboard the first operational Falcon Heavy on 11 April 2019 at 22:35 UTC from Kennedy Space Center LC-39A. Following a successful launch, the twin side boosters separated from the center core and returned to land at Landing Zones 1 and 2, while the center core completed its mission and landed on Of Course I Still Love You. En route to port after a successful landing, the center core tipped over in the rough seas, and was destroyed. Approximately 34 minutes after launch, the Arabsat-6A was released from the second stage and began a 17-day process to reach its operational orbit.

On June 15, 2021, the 4-tonne second stage re-entered the Earth's atmosphere, its orbit having gradually decayed due to atmospheric drag, with an uncontrolled splash down in the Coral Sea east of Australia
