= ViaSat-3 =

Constellation of geostationary communications satellites

ViaSat-3 is a planned global constellation of three geostationary K_{a}-band communications satellites, the first of which was launched in 2023. Operated by Viasat, Inc., the satellites are intended to provide broadband connectivity with speeds of 100-plus megabits per second to homes, business and enterprise internet users, commercial, government and business aircraft, as well as government and defense markets, maritime and oceanic enterprises in the Americas, Europe, the Middle East, Africa and Asia-Pacific.

== History ==
The satellites were first announced in 2015. In February 2016, Viasat announced a partnership with Boeing Satellite Systems. For each of the three ViaSat-3 class satellites, Viasat will build the satellite payload and Boeing will provide the 702 satellite bus, system integration and test, launch vehicle integration and mission operations services. Each ViaSat-3 satellite is being manufactured at Viasat's manufacturing facility in Tempe, Arizona and the Boeing Satellite Systems facility in El Segundo, California. The satellites are projected to each have a total network capacity over 1 terabit per second.

== Satellites ==
ViaSat-3 satellite constellation
Satellite	Initial region	Launch (UTC)	Rocket	Launch site	Status	Ref.
VS3 F1	Americas	1 May 2023, 00:26	Falcon Heavy	Kennedy, LC-39A	In service	
VS3 F2	EMEA (Europe, Middle East, Africa)	14 November 2025, 03:04	Atlas V 551	Cape Canaveral, SLC-41	In service	
VS3 F3	APAC (Asia-Pacific)	29 April 2026, 14:13	Falcon Heavy	Kennedy, LC-39A	In service	

The ViaSat-3 constellation consists of three separate satellites, each designed to provide coverage to a region: ViaSat-3 F1 will cover the Americas; ViaSat-3 F2 will cover Europe, the Middle East and Africa (EMEA); and ViaSat-3 F3 will cover the Asia-Pacific (APAC) regions. However due to technical difficulties with F1 that significantly lowered its capacity, once F2 is launched it will cover the Americas, and F1 will be moved to the EMEA region.

== Launches ==
Viasat has three launch contracts, one for each ViaSat-3 class satellite. In 2016, the company announced plans to launch the first satellite with Arianespace on an Ariane 6 rocket. In 2018, Viasat announced that the second one will be launched with United Launch Alliance on an Atlas V, and the third one with SpaceX on the Falcon Heavy.

The ViaSat-3 F1 (Americas) and ViaSat-3 F2 (EMEA) satellites at one time were expected to launch about six months apart starting in 2021, with the ViaSat-3 F3 (APAC) satellite projected to launch in the second half of 2022. However, in February, 2021, ViaSat's CEO announced that the company did not expect to launch the first satellite until early 2022. It would then take several months for the satellite to be in full service, because of necessary testing.

By 2023, delays to the inaugural Ariane 6 launch prompted Viasat to cancel their contract with Arianespace and seek bids from other companies to launch the ViaSat-3 APAC satellite.

ViaSat-3 F1 launched on 1 May 2023 aboard a Falcon Heavy rocket, which successfully placed it into a near-geosynchronous orbit in the early hours of 1 May at an altitude of approximately 34,600 kilometers. Deployment of the antenna did not occur nominally and the satellite's performance was severely affected. Viasat triggered a $420 million claim, a space insurance underwriter described the situation to CNBC as a “market changing event” for the sector. Viasat suffered its biggest one-day loss in share price following the news. In February 2024, Viasat announced that the crippled satellite is expected to enter commercial service in the second quarter of 2024 at less than ten percent of its 1 terabit per second capacity, and that a $421 million insurance claim had been filed.

The ViaSat-3 F2 satellite was launched in 14 November 2025 on an Atlas V rocket.

The ViaSat-3 F3 satellite was launched on 29 April 2026 on a Falcon Heavy rocket.

== See also ==
- ViaSat-2
