= Innovative Space-based Radar Antenna Technology =

Intelligence, surveillance, and reconnaissance spacecraft of the United States

ISAT
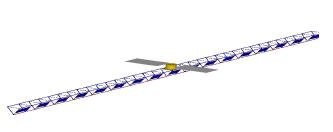
- ISAT computer model
- Mission type: Technology demonstration
- Operator: AFRL, DARPA, STP

Spacecraft properties
- Spacecraft: ISAT
- Manufacturer: Boeing, Lockheed Martin
- Dimensions: Antena: 300 m (980 ft)

Start of mission
- Launch date: 25 June 2019
- Rocket: Falcon Heavy
- Launch site: KSC LC-39A
- Contractor: SpaceX

Orbital parameters
- Reference system: Geocentric
- Regime: Low Earth

ISAT (Innovative Space-based radar Antenna Technology) is a spacecraft developed by the U.S. Air Force Research Laboratory's Space Vehicles Directorate to test technology for intelligence, surveillance, and reconnaissance spacecraft.

The ISAT program is developing technologies that enable the deployment of extremely large electronically scanning antennas in space, and the metrology and calibration technologies necessary for coherent beamforming from such large antennas. These huge antennas enable the revolutionary performance required to conduct tactical sensing from space, including missions like continuous reliable tracking of surface targets.
