= Deep Space Atomic Clock =

Atomic clock used for radio navigation in space

Deep Space Atomic Clock (DSAC)
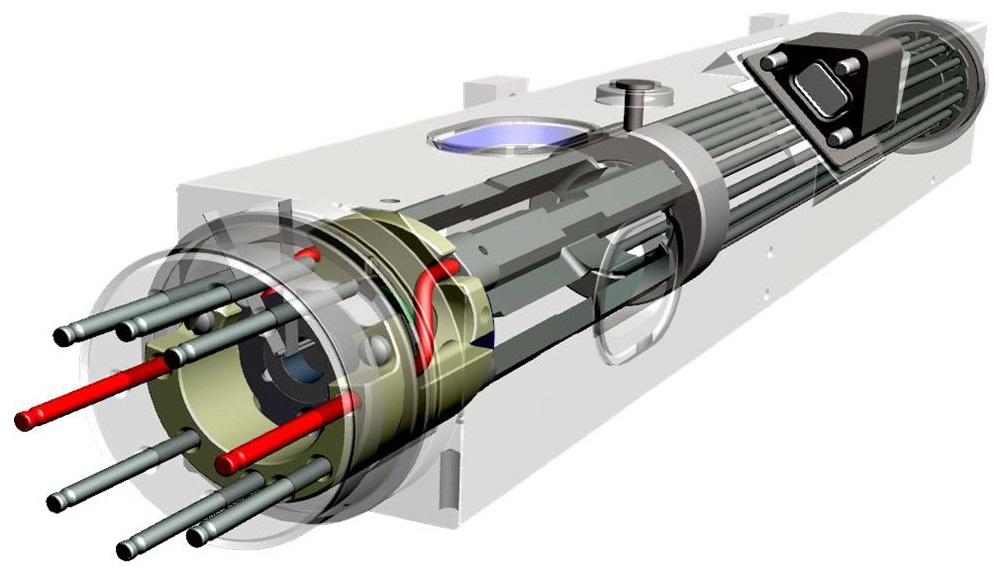
- The miniaturized Deep Space Atomic Clock was designed for precise and real-time radio navigation in deep space.
- Mission type: Navigation aid in deep space, gravity and occultation science
- Operator: Jet Propulsion Laboratory / NASA
- COSPAR ID: 2019-036C
- SATCAT no.: 44341
- Website: www.nasa.gov/mission_pages/tdm/clock/index.html
- Mission duration: Planned: 1 year Final: 2 years and 26 days

Spacecraft properties
- Spacecraft: Orbital Test Bed (OTB)
- Manufacturer: General Atomics Electromagnetic Systems
- Payload mass: 17.5 kg
- Dimensions: 29 × 26 × 23 cm (11 × 10 × 9 in)
- Power: 44 watts

Start of mission
- Launch date: 25 June 2019, 06:30:00 UTC
- Rocket: Falcon Heavy
- Launch site: KSC, LC-39A
- Contractor: SpaceX
- Entered service: 23 August 2019

End of mission
- Disposal: Deactivated
- Deactivated: 18 September 2021

Orbital parameters
- Reference system: Geocentric orbit
- Regime: Low Earth orbit
- Epoch: 25 June 2019

The Deep Space Atomic Clock (DSAC) was a miniaturized, ultra-precise mercury-ion atomic clock for precise radio navigation in deep space. DSAC was designed to be orders of magnitude more stable than existing navigation clocks, with a drift of no more than 1 nanosecond in 10 days. It is expected that a DSAC would incur no more than 1 microsecond of error in 10 years of operations. Data from DSAC is expected to improve the precision of deep space navigation, and enable more efficient use of tracking networks. The project was managed by NASA's Jet Propulsion Laboratory and it was deployed as part of the U.S. Air Force's Space Test Program 2 (STP-2) mission aboard a SpaceX Falcon Heavy rocket on 25 June 2019.

The Deep Space Atomic Clock was activated on 23 August 2019. Following a mission extension in June 2020, DSAC was deactivated on 18 September 2021 after two years in operation.

== Overview ==
Current ground-based atomic clocks are fundamental to deep space navigation; however, they are too large to be flown in space. This results in tracking data being collected and processed here on Earth (a two-way link) for most deep space navigation applications. The Deep Space Atomic Clock (DSAC) is a miniaturized and stable mercury ion atomic clock that is as stable as a ground clock. The technology could enable autonomous radio navigation for spacecraft's time-critical events such as orbit insertion or landing, promising new savings on mission operations costs. It is expected to improve the precision of deep space navigation, enable more efficient use of tracking networks, and yield a significant reduction in ground support operations.

Its applications in deep space include:

- Simultaneously track two spacecraft on a downlink with the Deep Space Network (DSN).
- Improve tracking data precision by an order of magnitude using the DSN's Ka-band downlink tracking capability.
- Mitigate Ka-band's weather sensitivity (as compared to two-way X-band) by being able to switch from a weather-impacted receiving antenna to one in a different location with no tracking outages.
- Track longer by using a ground antenna's entire spacecraft viewing period. At Jupiter, this yields a 10–15% increase in tracking; at Saturn, it grows to 15–25%, with the percentage increasing the farther a spacecraft travels.
- Make new discoveries as a Ka-band — capable radio science instrument with a 10 times improvement in data precision for both gravity and occultation science and deliver more data because of one-way tracking's operational flexibility.
- Explore deep space as a key element of a real-time autonomous navigation system that tracks one-way radio signals on the uplink and, coupled with optical navigation, provides for robust absolute and relative navigation.
- Fundamental to human explorers requiring real-time navigation data.

=== Principle and development ===
Over 20 years, engineers at NASA's Jet Propulsion Laboratory have been steadily improving and miniaturizing the mercury-ion trap atomic clock. The DSAC technology uses the property of mercury ions' hyperfine transition frequency at 40.50 GHz to effectively "steer" the frequency output of a quartz oscillator to a near-constant value. DSAC does this by confining the mercury ions with electric fields in a trap and protecting them by applying magnetic fields and shielding.

Its development includes a test flight in low Earth orbit, while using GPS signals to demonstrate precision orbit determination and confirm its performance in radio navigation.

The Deep Space Atomic Clock-2, an improved version of the DSAC, will fly on the VERITAS mission to Venus in 2028.

== Deployment ==
The flight unit is being hosted — along with four other payloads — on the Orbital Test Bed satellite, provided by General Atomics Electromagnetic Systems, using the Swift satellite bus. It was deployed as a secondary spacecraft during the U.S. Air Force's Space Test Program 2 (STP-2) mission aboard a SpaceX Falcon Heavy rocket on 25 June 2019.
