= Jupiter 3 =

Communications satellite

Jupiter 3 (EchoStar XXIV)
- Mission type: Communication
- Operator: EchoStar Corporation
- COSPAR ID: 2023-108A
- SATCAT no.: 57479
- Mission duration: 2 years, 8 months, 29 days (elapsed); 15+ years (planned)

Spacecraft properties
- Bus: SSL 1300
- Manufacturer: Maxar Technologies
- Launch mass: 9,200 kg (20,300 lb)
- Dry mass: 5,817 kg (12,824 lb)

Start of mission
- Launch date: 29 July 2023, 10:07 UTC (28 July, 11:07 pm EDT)
- Rocket: Falcon Heavy
- Launch site: Kennedy, LC-39A
- Contractor: SpaceX

Orbital parameters
- Reference system: Geocentric
- Regime: Geostationary
- Perigee altitude: 35,788.3 km (22,237.8 mi)
- Apogee altitude: 35,800.4 km (22,245.3 mi)
- Inclination: 2.6° => 0.0° 95°W

Jupiter 3, also known as (a.k.a.) EchoStar XXIV (24), is a communications satellite operated by Hughes Network Systems (an EchoStar company). It provides satellite internet service to customers across North and South America at download speeds of up to 100 Mbps.

== Overview ==
The satellite was built by Maxar Technologies in Palo Alto, California. When launched, the satellite held the title of the largest commercial communications satellite ever built. It weighs approximately nine tons and is nearly as large as a school bus, when its 14 solar panels are fully deployed, they could span a 10-story building. The satellite has 500 Gbit/s of throughput.

It was launched on a SpaceX Falcon Heavy rocket from Launch Complex 39A at Florida's Kennedy Space Center on 29 July 2023 at 10:07 UTC (11:07 pm EDT on 28 July, local time at the launch site).
