= DirecTV satellite fleet =

Communications satellite constellation

The DirecTV satellite fleet is a group of communications satellites located at various geostationary orbits that DirecTV uses for their satellite television service and HughesNet (formerly known as DirecWAY and DirecPC) internet service. The "DirecTV" prefix in their names has been changed to "T".

== Satellite table ==
Defunct satellites are highlighted in gold.

| Satellite | Orbital slot | Launch date* | Launch vehicle | Satellite type | Separated mass | Mass at BOL | Mass at EOL | Status |
|---|---|---|---|---|---|---|---|---|
| DirecTV-1 | 91.1°W | December 17, 1993 | Ariane 4 | Hughes Electronics HS-601 | 2,970 kilograms (6,550 lb) at GTO | 1,680 kilograms (3,700 lb) | 1,300 kilograms (2,900 lb) | Defunct as of February 2009 |
| DirecTV-2 | 100.8°W | August 3, 1994 | Atlas IIA | Hughes Electronics HS-601 | | | | Defunct as of May 2007 |
| DirecTV-3 | 91.1°W | June 10, 1995 | Ariane 42-P | Hughes Electronics HS-601 | | | | Renamed as Nimiq 3, defunct as of May 2009 |
| DirecTV-6 | 109.5°W | March 9, 1997 | Atlas IIA | Space Systems/Loral LS-1300 | | | | Defunct as of August 2006 |
| DirecTV-1R | 55.8°E | October 9, 1999 | Zenit-3SL | Hughes Electronics HS-601HP | | | | Defunct as of May 2014 |
| DirecTV-4S(or T4S) | 101.2° W | November 27, 2001 | Ariane 4 | Hughes Electronics HS-601P | | | | Defunct as of October 2019 |
| T5 (satellite) | 110.1° W | May 7, 2002 | Proton | Space Systems/Loral LS-1300 | 3,640 kilograms (8,025 lb) at TO | | | Defunct as of December 2018 |
| Galaxy 3C | 95°W | June 15, 2002 | Zenit-3SL | Boeing BSS-702 | | | | Operational, to be removed from fleet |
| T7S | 119.0°W | May 4, 2004 | Zenit-3SL | Space Systems/Loral LS-1300 | | | | Defunct as of 2021 |
| SPACEWAY-1 | 103.0°W | April 26, 2005 | Zenit-3SL | Boeing BSS-702 | | | | Defunct as of February 2020 |
| T8 | 119.0°W | May 22, 2005 | Proton M | Space Systems/Loral LS-1300 | | | | Operational |
| SPACEWAY-2 | 99.2°W | November 16, 2005 | Ariane 5 ECA | Boeing BSS-702 | | | | Operational |
| T9S | 101.1°W | October 13, 2006 | Ariane 5 ECA | Space Systems/Loral LS-1300 | | | | Operational |
| T10 (satellite) | 103.0°W | July 7, 2007 | Proton M | Boeing BSS-702 | 5,893 kilograms (12,992 lb) at GTO | | | Operational |
| T11 | 99.2°W | March 19, 2008 | Zenit-3SL | Boeing BSS-702 | 6,060 kilograms (13,360 lb) at GTO | 3,700 kilograms (8,200 lb) | | Operational |
| T12 | 103.0°W | December 28, 2009 | Proton M | Boeing BSS-702 | | | | Operational |
| T14 | 99.2°W | December 6, 2014 | Ariane 5 | Space Systems/Loral LS-1300 | | | | Operational |
| T15 | 103.0°W | May 27, 2015 | Ariane 5 | Astrium Eurostar E3000 | | | | Operational |
| T16 | 101.1°W | June 20, 2019 | Ariane 5 | Eurostar E3000 | | | | Operational |

== Details of satellite fleet ==
=== DirecTV 1 ===
The first of the fleet, DirecTV 1, launched on December 17, 1993, aboard an Ariane 4 launch vehicle. DirecTV 1 commenced operations on June 17, 1994, positioned at 101.2° W. The satellite experienced a satellite control processor failure in July 1998, but the satellite was able to continue operating on its backup SCP for the rest of its operational life. In 1999, the satellite was relocated to 110° W. In June 2003, the satellite was relocated back to 101.2° W, as the satellite was incapable of providing service to Hawaii. In July 2005, the satellite was relocated to 72.5° W, as the former satellite at that position (DirecTV 5) had moved to 110° W to replace DirecTV 6, which was approaching the end of its fuel life. In 2007, the satellite was relocated to 91.1° W, and leased to Telesat. Having reached the end of its useful lifespan, DirecTV 1 was de-orbited on February 20, 2009.

=== DirectTV 2 ===
DirecTV 2 was launched on August 3, 1994, aboard an Atlas 2-A rocket from Cape Canaveral. This spacecraft is special in that it carries a time capsule named SpaceArc, with the intention of moving the spacecraft into a higher orbit at the end of its life so that an explorer would be able to uncover the messages in the distant future. Among the items contained in SpaceArc are messages from then Vice President Al Gore and his predecessor Dan Quayle. In January 2006, the satellite was relocated to 91.1° W, in order to support Telesat's BSS service in Canada. DirecTV 2 reached the end of its operational life on May 20, 2007, when it was successfully de-orbited.

=== DirecTV 3/Nimiq 3 ===
DirecTV 3 was launched on June 10, 1995, aboard an Ariane 42-P launch rocket, serving as an in-orbit backup. In 2002, the satellite's main spacecraft control processor failed, prompting DirecTV to move the spacecraft into a storage orbit. The satellite was recalled in October 2003 and leased to Telesat, relocating to 82° W in order to provide backup for Nimiq 2. In 2004, the satellite was relocated to 91° W, backing up Nimiq 1. The satellite reached the end of its life and was subsequently de-orbited in May 2009.

=== DirecTV-1R ===
DirecTV-1R was launched on October 9, 1999, aboard a Sea Launch Zenit-3SL launch vehicle. It was the first satellite used to broadcast local channels for DirecTV in major DMAs, and was positioned at 101.2° W when it first entered service. In April 2007, the satellite was relocated to 72.5° W and leased to Telesat to cover the loss of DirecTV 2 and serve as backup capacity to the troubled Nimiq 2 satellite. In early 2012, DirecTV-1R was briefly repositioned to 109.8° W as a spare for DirecTV-5, however, in mid-2012, it was announced that DirecTV-1R would be leased to the Russian Satellite Communications Company, and was repositioned to its current location at 55.8° E in late 2012 as a stopgap supplement to the RSCC's aging Bonum 1 satellite due to delays of the RSCC's Express-AT1 satellite. Express-AT1 was launched on March 15, 2014, and DirecTV 1R was de-orbited on May 22, 2014.

=== T4S ===
T4S (formerly DirecTV-4S) was successfully launched on November 27, 2001, aboard an Ariane 44LP rocket from the Guiana Space Center on the northeastern coast of South America. T4S was a 9,400-pound, 86-foot-long, and 24.5-foot-wide high powered satellite. T4S was the first satellite for DirecTV to employ spot beams. This technology reuses the same frequencies on multiple spot beams to reach the major television markets where DirecTV delivers the signals of local network affiliates. The satellite carried two Ku-band payloads: spot beams for local channels, and a national beam payload. The spot beam payload used a total of 38 traveling wave-tube amplifiers (TWTAs) ranging in power from 30 to 88 watts. The national beam payload carried two active transponders with further capability for two active high-power transponders and six active low-power transponders. The satellite was stationed at 101° W for its entire operational life. In September 2019, T4S reached the end of its operational life and was subsequently de-orbited.

=== T5 ===
T5 (formerly DirecTV 5) was successfully launched on May 7, 2002, aboard a Proton rocket from the Baikonur Cosmodrome in Kazakhstan. Originally built for PrimeStar, DirecTV acquired the satellite in its 1999 buyout of the company. The satellite was relocated from 119° W to 72.5° W in 2004 and temporarily leased to Telesat for their Canadian BSS service. In July 2005, the satellite replaced DirecTV 6 at 110° W, where it has remained ever since.

=== Galaxy 3C ===
Galaxy 3C is a geostationary communications satellite located at 95° W. It was launched on June 15, 2002, with a Sea Launch vehicle, and is currently active on the C and K_{u} bands, with 24 transponders for each. Owned by Intelsat, some of the satellite's users include DirecTV's Brazil and Latin America systems, the Racetrack TV Network DBS service, and HughesNet. DirecTV is currently slowly discontinuing use of this satellite, with international channels moving to T12 and T14.

Rite Aid, TJ Maxx, and Chevron use Galaxy 3C as a VSAT platform.

=== T7S ===
T7S (formerly DirecTV 7S) was successfully launched on May 4, 2004, aboard a Sea Launch Zenit-3SL launch vehicle. The satellite, located at 119° W, is the second of the fleet to employ spot beams, with a main focus on providing high capacity for local channels. The satellite is scheduled to be de-orbited starting January 11, 2021.

=== Spaceway 1 and Spaceway 2 ===
The SPACEWAY satellites were originally designed for use by Hughes Electronics to provide both TV and broadband internet service. The satellites were re-purposed for DirecTV after News Corporation purchased a controlling interest in Hughes. Though Spaceway 1 was damaged and subsequently shut down in February 2020, Spaceway 2 continues to operate as a backup satellite.

=== T8 ===
T8 (formerly DirecTV 8) was successfully launched on May 22, 2005, aboard a Proton M launch vehicle from the Baikonur Cosmodrome in Kazakhstan. The first Ku/Ka hybrid satellite in the fleet, T8 employs 16 transponders. In 2020, T8 was relocated to 119° W, replacing T7S.

=== T9S ===
T9S (formerly DirecTV 9S) was successfully launched on October 13, 2006, aboard a Ariane 5 launch vehicle. T9S is fitted with 52 Ku-band transponders and 2 Ka-band transponders, making for a total of 54 high-power transponders. The satellite is located at 101.1° W.

=== T10 ===
T10 (formerly DirecTV 10) was successfully launched on July 6, 2007, aboard a Proton M launch vehicle from the Baikonur Cosmodrome in Kazakhstan. T10 is employed with 55 spot-beam Ka-band transponders and 32 broad-beam transponders, making up for a total of 87 high-power transponders. T10's launch marked the beginning of mass HDTV expansion for DirecTV, as its transponders employed MPEG-4 technology. Shortly after launch, T10 suffered an anomaly that limited the satellite's capacity, prompting DirecTV to temporarily transfer all commercial service from T10 to T11 while the company worked on fixing the issue. During the process, T10 was relocated slightly from 102.8° W to 102.6° W. The fixes were eventually completed and T10 drifted back to 102.8° W, where it currently remains.

=== T11 ===
T11 (formerly DirecTV 11) was successfully launched on March 19, 2008, aboard a Sea Launch Zenit-3SL launch vehicle. The satellite is functionally identical to T10 and is located at 99.2° W.

=== T12 ===
T12 (formerly DirecTV 12) was successfully launched on December 28, 2009, aboard a Proton M launch vehicle from the Baikonur Cosmodrome in Kazakhstan. After a period of testing, T12 commenced operations on May 17, 2010. T12's payload consists of 32 active and 12 spare Ka-band traveling-wave tube amplifiers and 55 active and 15 spare spot beam TWTAs. T12 is located at 102.75 W as of October 2020.

=== T14 ===
T14 (formerly DirecTV 14) was successfully launched on December 6, 2014, aboard a Ariane 5 launch vehicle from the Guiana Space Center in South America. T14 was built by Space Systems/Loral on their SSL-1300 bus and carries 14 Ka-band transponders, as well as 18 "reverse-band" transponders. The satellite has a design life of 15 years and is located at 99° W.

=== T15 ===
T15 (formerly DirecTV 15) was successfully launched on May 27, 2015, aboard a Ariane 5 launch vehicle from the Guiana Space Center in South America. The first DirecTV satellite to be built by Airbus, T15's payload consists of 30 Ka-band and 24 Ku-band transponders respectively, as well as 18 "reverse-band" transponders. T15 is located at 103° W.

=== T16 ===
T16 was successfully launched on June 20, 2019, aboard a Ariane 5 launch vehicle from the Guiana Space Center in South America. Launched to replace several older satellites nearing the end of their operational life, the satellite is located at 101° W. AT&T (DirecTV's parent company at the time) stated after the launch that they did not have any plans to launch new satellites.

== See also ==
- List of broadcast satellites
- DirecTV
