= Digital Satellite Service =

1990s American digital satellite system

Digital Satellite System is the initialism expansion of the DSS digital satellite television transmission system used by DirecTV. Only when digital transmission was introduced did direct broadcast satellite (DBS) television become popular in North America, which has led to both DBS and DSS being used interchangeably to refer to all three commonplace digital transmission formats; DSS, DVB-S and 4DTV. Analog DBS services, however, existed prior to DirecTV and were still operational in continental Europe until April 2012.

At the time of DirecTV's launch in 1994, the DVB-S digital satellite system in use in the majority of the world had not yet been standardised, the Thomson developed DSS system was used instead.

While functionally similar in DVB-S – MPEG 2 video, MPEG-1 Layer II or AC3 audio, QPSK modulation, and identical error correction (Reed–Solomon coding and Viterbi forward error correction), the transport stream and information tables are entirely different from those of DVB. Also unlike DVB, all DSS receivers are proprietary DirecTV reception units.

DirecTV is now using a modified version of DVB-S2, the latest version of the DVB-S protocol, for HDTV services off the SPACEWAY-1, SPACEWAY-2, DirecTV-10 and DirecTV-11 satellites; however, huge numbers of DSS encoded channels still remain. The ACM modulation scheme used by DirecTV prevents regular DVB-S2 demodulators from receiving the signal although the data carried are regular MPEG-4 transport streams.

== See also ==
- Direct Broadcast Satellite
