= JCSAT-5A =

Geostationary communications satellite

- Names: JCSAT-5A; N-STAR d JCSAT-9
- Mission type: Communications
- Operator: SKY Perfect JSAT Group
- COSPAR ID: 2006-010A
- SATCAT no.: 29045
- Mission duration: 12 years (planned)

Spacecraft properties
- Spacecraft: JCSAT-5A
- Bus: A2100-AX
- Manufacturer: Lockheed Martin
- Launch mass: 4,401 kg (9,703 lb)

Start of mission
- Launch date: 12 April 2006, 23:29:59 UTC
- Rocket: Zenit-3SL
- Launch site: Odyssey
- Contractor: Sea Launch

Orbital parameters
- Reference system: Geocentric orbit
- Regime: Geostationary orbit
- Longitude: 132° East

Transponders
- Band: Ku-band: 8 × 54 Mhz + 12 × 36 MHz; C-band: 20 x 36 MHz; S-band beam
- Bandwidth: 1,584 MHz
- Coverage area: Japan, Asia
- TWTA power: Ku-band: 110 watts C-band: 45 watts S-band: 130 watts

JCSAT-5A or N-STAR d, known as JCSAT-9 before launch, is a geostationary communications satellite operated by SKY Perfect JSAT Group (JSAT), which was designed and manufactured by Lockheed Martin on the A2100 platform.

== Satellite description ==
The spacecraft was designed and manufactured by Lockheed Martin on the A2100-AX satellite bus. It had a launch mass of 4,401 kg (9,703 lb) and a 12-year design life. It would provide communications services throughout Japan and Asia and for NTT DoCoMo.As most satellites based on the A2100-AX platform, it uses a 460 N (100 lb_{f}) LEROS-1C liquid apogee engine (LAE) for orbit raising. Its solar panels span 26.9 m (88 ft) when fully deployed, and, with its antennas in fully extended configurations it is 14.3 m (47 ft) wide.

Its payload consists of eight 54 MHz and twelve 36 MHz Ku-band transponders, twenty 36 MHz C-band transponders, and one S-band beam. The Ku-band transponders have a TWTA output power of 110 watts, a C-band of 45 watts, and a S beam of 130 watts.

== History ==
On 30 April 2003, JSAT awarded an order for JCSAT-9 to Lockheed Martin and its A2100-AXS platform. Moreover in May 2003, JSAT leased some transponders to NTT DoCoMo to be used as N-STAR d for its WIDESTAR II service. A hybrid satellite with 20 C-band, 20 Ku-band, and 1 S-band transponders, it was expected to launch in 2005 for the 132° East slot.

On 12 April 2006 at 23:29:59 UTC, a Zenit-3SL launching from the offshore Odyssey launch platform successfully orbited JCSAT-9. Separation from the launch vehicle occurred at 00:38:02 UTC. JSAT had leased some transponders to NTT DoCoMo to be used as N-STAR d. Once in its 132° East orbital position, it was renamed JCSAT-5A and N-STAR d.

== See also ==
- Sea Launch
- 2006 in spaceflight
