= Valery Aliev =

Russian scientist (born 1941)

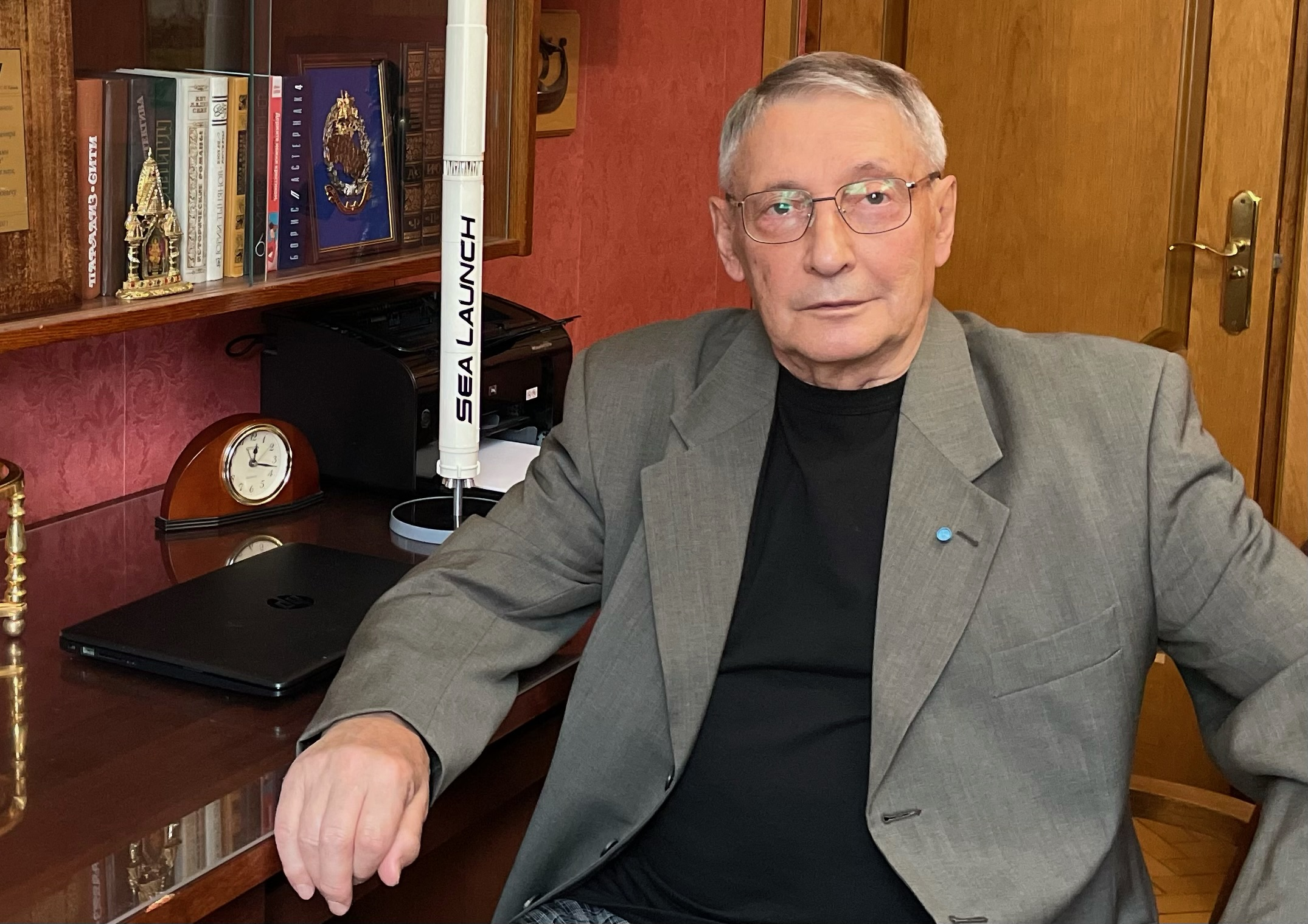
- Born: Valery Geidarovich Aliev; February 9, 1941; Kharkiv, Ukrainian SSR, Soviet Union
- Died: February 9, 2025 (aged 84)
- Citizenship: Soviet Union; Russian Federation
- Education: Department of Physics and Technology of the Dnipropetrovsk State University (now the Oles Honchar Dnipro National University)
- Occupations: Aerospace engineering; rocket technologies
- Organizations: Energia Corporation; S7 Space
- Awards: Order of Friendship; Medal of the Order For Merit to the Fatherland; Medal "In Commemoration of the 850th Anniversary of Moscow"; Sergei Korolev Order of the Russian Space Federation; Jubilee Medal "300 Years of the Russian Navy"

Valery Geidarovich Aliev (Russian: Валерий Гейдарович Алиев, IPA:[vɐˈlʲerʲɪj ɡʲɪjdɐˈrovʲɪtɕ ɐˈlʲijɪf]; born 9 February 1941, Kharkiv, Ukrainian SSR) is a Soviet and Russian scientist, spacecraft engineer and innovator, member of the Tsiolkovsky Space Academy and the International Academy of Astronautics.

Valery Aliev was Executive Vice President at ELUS (Energia Logistics United States, 2010–2015), chief scientist and deputy general designer at Energia Corporation (2010–2017), advisor to the CEO of S7 Space LLC (2017–2019), advisor at RTSS (Reusable Transport Space Systems LLC, 2019–2023), and served as chief designer of the Aspire launch vehicle (2024–2025) within the Aspire Reusable Space Transportation System (RSTS) project.

== Life and career ==
In 1964, Valery Aliev graduated from the Department of Physics and Technology of the Dnipropetrovsk State University (now the Oles Honchar Dnipro National University) with a degree in Aerospace Engineering and joined the Energia Corporation, then known as the Special Design Bureau no. 1, to work under Sergei Korolev. His first project (1965–1970) involved improving the propulsive efficiency of the N1 carrier rocket and the related lunar system. Aliev’s next area of responsibility was the design and development of the Buran spaceplane, a programme he followed first as a group lead, then as a tech lead, and f inally a department head.

In 1991–1996, Aliev oversaw the integration of the American and Russian systems under the aegis of the Shuttle–Mir programme that enabled the US Space Shuttles to rendezvous and dock at the Russian Space Station Mir. In this capacity, he joined the intergovernmental Russian–American expert advisory board alongside Vladimir Utkin. In 1993, Aliev became a Doctor of Science and proceeded to oversee the development of the prototype of a space energy module with a solar gas turbine instead of the regular solar batteries. He went on to become deputy general designer (2000), programme lead (2000–2010), and department head (2010–2017) at Energia. In 2010–2015, Aliev also served as Vice President and launch director at Energia Logistics US, a California-based affiliate of Russian Energia responsible for engineering services and management of the Zenit-3SL launch system for Sea Launch — a multinational company specialised in satellite structures. Notably, Aliev was in charge of developing and implementing solutions for the port base of Long Beach and the ocean-based Odyssey launch platform that moved to the equatorial Pacific Ocean for take-off. In total, Aliev supervised 36 successful missions from Sea Launch, starting from 2005. After his retirement in 2017, Aliev continued a productive career of executive advisor first for S7 Space (2017–2019), then for RTSS (Reusable Transport Space Systems LLC, 2019–2023) and served as chief designer of the Aspire launch vehicle (2024–2025) within the Aspire Reusable Space Transportation System (RSTS) project.

== Bibliography ==
Valery Aliev published over 250 articles and books and received 28 invention patents. His most recent works include popular science titles:

- Sea Launch: Space and Ocean. Pero Print, Moscow, 2020;
- The Earth's Ozone Layer. co-au. Pavel Vinogradov. Pero Print, Moscow, 2022;
- Cosmodromes of the World. Cosmos and Earth. Pero Print, Moscow, 2024.

== Awards and honours ==
- Honorary Professional Order of the Russian Federation
- Badge of Honour for Exceptional Contribution to Space Programmes
