= SICRAL 1B =

Italian military communications satellite

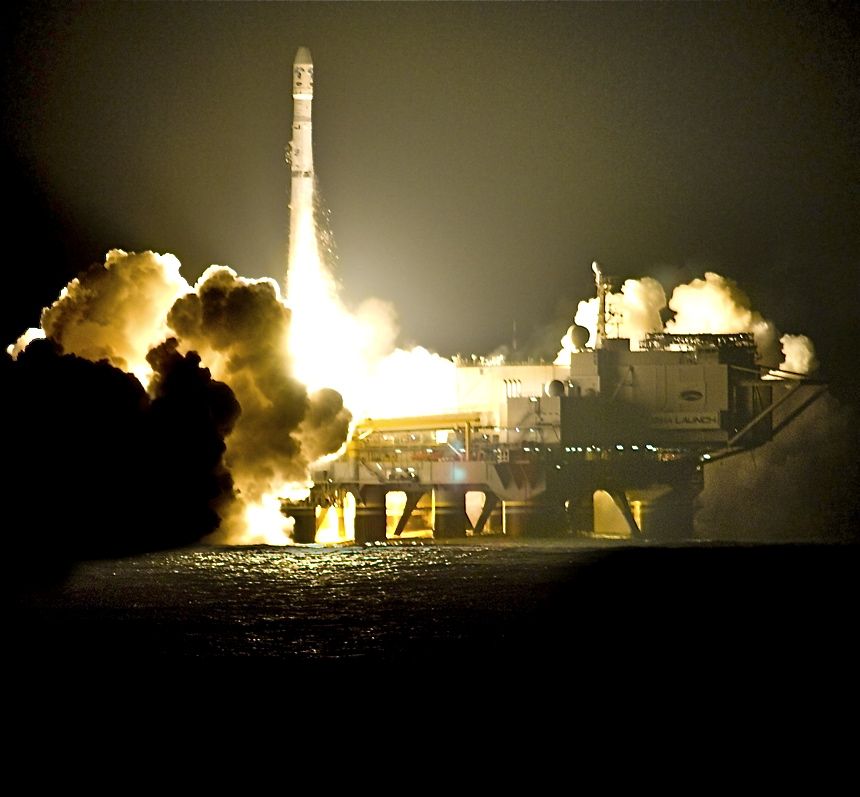
- Launch of SICRAL-1B
- Mission type: Communications
- Operator: Telespazio; MDD, Turkey
- COSPAR ID: 2009-020A
- SATCAT no.: 34810
- Mission duration: 13 years

Spacecraft properties
- Bus: Italsat 3000
- Manufacturer: Thales Alenia Space
- Launch mass: 3,038 kilograms (6,698 lb)

Start of mission
- Launch date: 20 April 2009, 08:15:59 UTC
- Rocket: Zenit-3SL
- Launch site: Odyssey launch platform near Kiribati
- Contractor: Sea Launch

Orbital parameters
- Reference system: Geocentric
- Regime: Geostationary
- Longitude: 11.8° east
- Perigee altitude: 35,775 kilometres (22,230 mi)
- Apogee altitude: 35,811 kilometres (22,252 mi)
- Inclination: 0.11 degrees
- Period: 23.93 hours
- Epoch: 25 October 2013, 02:29:49 UTC

SICRAL 1B is a military communications satellite built by Thales Alenia Space for Italian Armed Forces. It is a dual-use spacecraft: Telespazio will use some of the satellite's transmission capacity and some will be used by the Italian defense ministry and NATO. The spacecraft is based on the Italsat 3000 bus and includes one EHF/Ka band, three UHF-band and five active SHF-band transponders. It is designed to be operable for 13 years.

== Construction ==
Thales Alenia Space was the prime contractor for development and construction of the SICRAL 1B satellite.

== Launch ==
On April 20, 2009 Sea Launch used a Zenit-3SL to carry SICRAL 1B into a geosynchronous transfer orbit. Liftoff from the Ocean Odyssey launch platform took place at 08:16 GMT.
