= Eutelsat 70B =

French communications satellite

- Names: Eutelsat W5A (pre-launch); Eutelsat 70B
- Mission type: Communication
- Operator: Eutelsat
- COSPAR ID: 2012-069A
- SATCAT no.: 39020
- Mission duration: 15 years

Spacecraft properties
- Bus: Eurostar E3000
- Manufacturer: EADS Astrium
- Launch mass: 5,210 kilograms (11,490 lb)
- Power: 12kW

Start of mission
- Launch date: 3 December 2012, 20:43 UTC
- Rocket: Zenit-3SL
- Launch site: Odyssey
- Contractor: Sea Launch

Orbital parameters
- Reference system: Geocentric
- Regime: Geostationary
- Longitude: 70.5° East

Transponders
- Band: 48
- Bandwidth: 54 and 72 megahertz
- Coverage area: Widebeam (South & Western Asia and North Africa); Europe; Central Asia (Central & Western Asia); Asia (South East Asia and Australia); Africa (East & Central Africa)

Eutelsat 70B is a commercial communications satellite run by Eutelsat. It was launched on 3 December 2012 and is designed to provide telecommunication services for the Middle East, Central Asia, South East Asia and parts of Africa. It will replace Eutelsat 70A, which was previously known as Eutelsat W5. That satellite, which was launched in 2002, currently occupies the same 70.5° E location this satellite is intended for.

== Satellite ==
Eutelsat 70B was built by EADS Astrium based on their Eurostar E-3000 bus. It contains 48 Ku band transponders in four distinct beams covering Europe, Asia, Africa and South East Asia. The transponders have bandwidths of 54 MHz and 72 MHz and will operate on the frequencies 10.95 to 11.70 GHz, 11.20 to 11.45 GHz, 11.45 to 11.70 GHz and 12.5 to 12.75 GHz.

The craft is 7 m high with a width of 8m due to the antennas. It is 30m long with solar panels extended.

One of the functions of the satellite will be for secure government communications in Central Asia.

The satellite was originally known as Eutelsat W5A until March 2012 when Eutelsat changed their satellite naming schedule. Eutelsat 70A, previously known as Eutelsat W5, will move to a different location once its replacement is operational, which is expected to be mid January 2013.

== Launch ==
Eutelsat 70B was launched on 3 December 2012 by Sealaunch using a Zenit 3SL rocket with a Block DM-SL upper stage. It launched from the floating platform Ocean Odyssey at 154°W at Kiritimati in the Pacific Ocean. It was launched at 20:43 UTC and the satellite separated at 21:50 UTC and was placed into geosynchronous transfer orbit. It was given the international designator 2012-069A and the United States Space Command assigned it the Satellite Catalog Number 39020.

The launch was delayed for 24 hours as the floating launch pad was delayed arriving at the launch site.

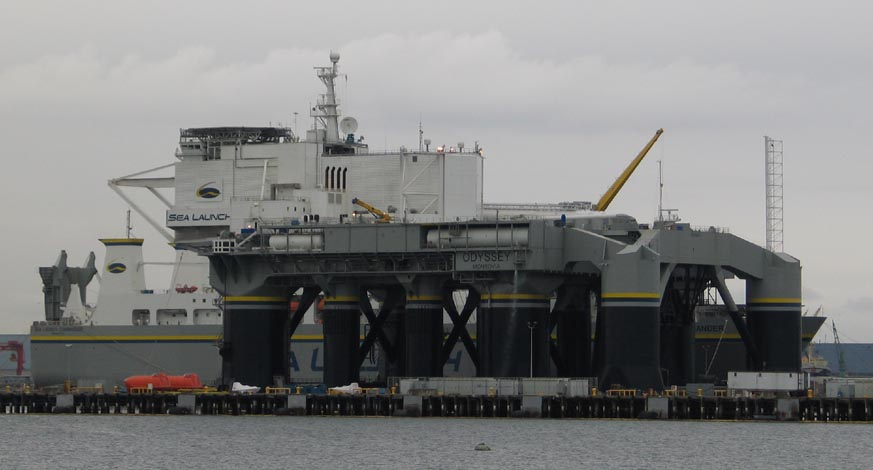
Ocean Odyssey floating launch platform
