= EchoStar X =

Communications satellite

- Mission type: Communication
- Operator: EchoStar
- COSPAR ID: 2006-003A
- SATCAT no.: 28935
- Mission duration: 16 years (planned)

Spacecraft properties
- Bus: A2100AXS
- Manufacturer: Lockheed Martin
- Launch mass: 4,333 kilograms (9,553 lb)

Start of mission
- Launch date: 15 February 2006, 23:34:55 UTC
- Rocket: Zenit-3SL
- Launch site: Ocean Odyssey
- Contractor: Sea Launch

Orbital parameters
- Reference system: Geocentric
- Regime: Geostationary
- Longitude: 110° West
- Perigee altitude: 35,780 kilometers (22,230 mi)
- Apogee altitude: 35,792 kilometers (22,240 mi)
- Inclination: 0 degrees
- Period: 24 hours

Transponders
- Band: 42 J band

EchoStar X, also known as EchoStar 10, is an American geostationary communications satellite which is operated by EchoStar on behalf of Dish Network. It is positioned in Geostationary orbit at a longitude of 110° West, from where it is used to provide direct broadcasting services to the United States.

EchoStar X was built by Lockheed Martin, and is based on the A2100AXS satellite bus. It is equipped with 42 J band (IEEE K_{u} band) transponders, and at launch it had a mass of 4,333 kilograms (9,553 lb), with an expected operational lifespan of 16 years

The satellite was launched using a Sea Launch Zenit-3SL carrier rocket flying from the Ocean Odyssey launch platform. The launch occurred at 23:34:55 GMT on 15 February 2006, leaving Echostar X in a geosynchronous transfer orbit. Its orbit was then raised using an onboard LEROS-1C apogee motor, with insertion into geostationary orbit occurring at 20:50 GMT on 22 February.

== See also ==
- 2006 in spaceflight
