= Launch Services Alliance =

Launch services joint venture between Arianespace and Mitsubishi Heavy Industries

- Company type: Joint venture
- Industry: Aerospace
- Founded: 2003; 23 years ago
- Products: launch service provider
- Owners: Arianespace; Mitsubishi Heavy Industries

Launch Services Alliance is a "back-up" launch service provider. It is a joint venture between the multinational aerospace company Arianespace and Japanese conglomerate Mitsubishi Heavy Industries; initially, the American aerospace firm Boeing Launch Services was involved as well.

LSA was established during 2003. In the event of one of the commercial partners not being able to execute a launch on time, one of the other partners could provide an alternative service, under a set of contractual conditions agreed between the participating companies. Such transfers would be made at the customer's discretion. The LSA offered this service for the Ariane 5 and H-IIA expendable launch systems; it previously offered the Zenit-3SL as well.

== History ==
Following the end of the Cold War and the institution of the peace dividend, the aerospace industry went through a period of consolidation, mergers and partnerships. More specifically, a glut in affordable space launches during the early 2000s placed incumbent providers under pressure to respond. During 2001, the Japanese conglomerate Mitsubishi Heavy Industries and American aerospace firm Boeing Launch Services announced the formation of a strategic alliance to cooperate on various space-related opportunities; specifically, this alliance applied to space-based communications, air traffic management, multimedia, navigation, space and communications services, launch services and space infrastructure markets.

During July 2003, the Launch Services Alliance (LSA) was originally formed, then consisting of the multinational aerospace company Arianespace with Japanese conglomerate Mitsubishi Heavy Industries and American aerospace firm Boeing Launch Services; at this time, Boeing provided Sea Launch Zenit-3SL launch services at that time. The decision to switch between launchers is made by the end customer. Despite the formation of LSA, the three partner companies retained autonomy over their own operations and continued to independently market their respective commercial satellite launch capabilities. For Arianespace, its involvement in LSA represented a further diversification of their launch services.

During October 2003, LSA services were used for the first time when Arianespace transferred satellite DirecTV-7S delayed in manufacturing to the Zenit-3SL launch on 4 May 2004. During May 2004, the first contract for LSA services was signed for the Optus D1 satellite; Ariane 5 was assigned as the primary launch vehicle while the Zenit-3SL was served as backup. During 2005, LSA announced that the organisation had signed its fifth contract.

During April 2007, the LSA was reformed by Arianespace and Mitsubishi Heavy Industries; the main change being the withdrawal of Boeing from any involvement in the venture. Since fiscal year 2007, responsibility for both production and management of the H-IIA launch system was transferred to Mitsubishi Heavy Industries, the partnership with Arianespace was hoped to help the former enter the market.
