= T12 (satellite) =

Telecommunications satellite

- Mission type: Communications
- Operator: DirecTV
- COSPAR ID: 2009-075A
- SATCAT no.: 36131
- Mission duration: Elapsed: 16 years, 8 months

Spacecraft properties
- Bus: BSS-702
- Manufacturer: Boeing

Start of mission
- Launch date: December 29, 2009, 00:22:00 UTC
- Rocket: Proton-M/Briz-M
- Launch site: Baikonur 200/39
- Contractor: ILS

Orbital parameters
- Reference system: Geocentric
- Regime: Geostationary
- Longitude: 76° West (testing); 103.0° West (current)
- Perigee altitude: 35,791 kilometers (22,239 mi)
- Apogee altitude: 35,795 kilometers (22,242 mi)
- Inclination: 0.04 degrees
- Period: 1436.12 minutes
- Epoch: January 24, 2015, 09:34:01 UTC

Transponders
- Band: 500 MHz

T12, formerly known as D12, is a Boeing model 702 satellite built by the Boeing Satellite Development Center. It was launched on December 29, 2009 and became operational on May 19, 2010. It is used by DirecTV to provide additional high definition channels and Video on demand content, as well as 3DTV channels and content. The satellite adopted its current name in 2017.

== Technology ==
This satellite is similar to T10 and T11, but features a 17/24 GHz BSS payload carrying the moniker RB-2A. It is co-located with T10 very near 103.0°W.

== Launch data ==
On November 27, the satellite was shipped to the Baikonur Cosmodrome in the Kazakhstan desert from the Boeing facility in El Segundo, California.

T12 was launched successfully by International Launch Services on December 29, 2009 at 6:22 AM Kazakhstan time (00:22 UTC) from the Baikonur Cosmodrome in Kazakhstan aboard an Enhanced Proton Breeze-M rocket. The launch was televised publicly live on DirecTV channel 577, on C-Band satellite, and online at ILS's website.

== Testing stage ==
T12 reached 76° W on February 11, 2010 and began testing 2 days later. After 3 weeks of scheduled testing, RB-2A began being tested. On April 23, T12 was granted a Special Temporary Authority to continue testing at 76° W for 30 more days. Testing was completed in late April.

== Drift to final position ==
On March 31, 2010 DirecTV filed a Special Temporary Authority for permission to drift to its final position at 103° W. It was granted on April 23. It reached its final position on May 11 and began operations on May 13. Boeing handed the satellite over to DirecTV on May 17.

== Broadcasting to customers ==
T12 increased DirecTV's national HD channel capacity to over 200 channels and expanded its availability of local channels in HD. DirecTV has used the new satellite to add more HD channels, expand its pay-per-view movie service "DirecTV Cinema" and on demand titles. It also carried 3DTV channels. DirecTV began adding new HD channels on May 19 and continued June 23 and later in the summer. DirecTV added the first 3D channel to T12, ESPN 3D, on June 11, and new channels n3D and a pay-per-view 3D movie channel on July 1. A few more HD channels were added onto it in the fall of 2010, the winter of 2010-11, and the spring and summer of 2011; and more in 2012. The 3DTV channels were removed by 2014 due to consumer disinterest in the format.

== See also ==
- DirecTV satellite fleet
