= Spaceway-1 =

Direct broadcast satellite

- Mission type: communication
- Operator: AT&T Communications
- COSPAR ID: 2005-015A
- SATCAT no.: 28644
- Mission duration: 12 years (planned); 14 years, 9 months, 18 days (achieved)

Spacecraft properties
- Bus: BSS-702
- Manufacturer: Boeing
- Launch mass: 6080 kg
- Dry mass: 3691 kg
- Dimensions: 3.4 x 3.2 x 5.1 metre
- Power: 12.3 kW

Start of mission
- Launch date: 26 April 2005, 07:32 UTC
- Rocket: Zenit-3SL
- Launch site: Odyssey
- Contractor: Sea Launch
- Entered service: June 2005

End of mission
- Disposal: Graveyard orbit
- Deactivated: February 14th, 2020

Orbital parameters
- Reference system: Geocentric orbit
- Regime: Geostationary Orbit
- Longitude: 102.8° West

Transponders
- Band: 72 Ka-band transponders
- Frequency: 500 MHz
- Coverage area: North America, all Earth

Spaceway-1 was a part of AT&T's constellation of direct broadcast satellites.

The satellite was launched via a Zenit-3SL rocket from Sea Launch's Odyssey equatorial ocean platform on 26 April 2005.

Its operational position was in geosynchronous orbit 35,800 kilometres (22,200 mi) above the equator at 102.8° West longitude. Spaceway-1 was a Boeing 702-model satellite with a 12-year operational life expectancy.

It provided high-definition television to DirecTV customers with its K_{a}-band communications payload. DirecTV did not make use of the broadband capabilities on Spaceway-1 even though it was originally built by Boeing for this purpose.

== History ==
Spaceway-1 was the heaviest commercial communications satellite 6080 kg ever put into orbit until iPSTAR-1 (6775 kg) was launched by Arianespace on 11 August 2005.

T10 was co-located with Spaceway-1 in order to use the 500 MHz of unused spectrum for HDTV broadcasting. This spectrum was originally intended for the broadband internet capabilities of the two Spaceway satellites, called Spaceway, which were disabled by Hughes Network Systems at the request of DirecTV.

== Retirement ==
During its last years, Spaceway-1 mainly served as a backup satellite. In December 2019, the satellite suffered significant and irreversible thermal damage to its battery, forcing it to rely only on power generated from its solar arrays and prompting AT&T to request the spacecraft be decommissioned before February 25, 2020, to prevent the risk of the spacecraft exploding. The satellite was moved into a graveyard orbit above the geostationary orbit and was announced as decommissioned on February 14, 2020.
