= Eutelsat 33B =

- Names: Eutelsat 3 F-1; Eutelsat W1 (pre-launch); Eutelsat W5 (2002-2012); Eutelsat 70A (2012-2013); Eutelsat 25C (2013-2014); Eutelsat 33B (2014-2015)
- Mission type: Communications
- Operator: Eutelsat S.A.
- COSPAR ID: 2002-051A
- SATCAT no.: 27554
- Website: https://www.eutelsat.com/en/home.html
- Mission duration: 12 years (planned); 13 years (achieved)

Spacecraft properties
- Spacecraft: Eutelsat W5
- Spacecraft type: Spacebus
- Bus: Spacebus-3000B2
- Manufacturer: Alcatel Space
- Launch mass: 3,170 kg (6,990 lb)
- Dry mass: 1,400 kg (3,100 lb)
- Dimensions: 4.6 m × 2.5 m × 1.8 m (15.1 ft × 8.2 ft × 5.9 ft); Span on orbit: 29 m (95 ft)
- Power: 5.9 kW

Start of mission
- Launch date: 20 November 2002, 22:39:00 UTC
- Rocket: Delta 4M+(4,2) (s/n D293)
- Launch site: Cape Canaveral, SLC-37B
- Contractor: Boeing
- Entered service: January 2003

End of mission
- Disposal: Graveyard orbit
- Deactivated: October 2015

Orbital parameters
- Reference system: Geocentric orbit
- Regime: Geostationary orbit

Transponders
- Band: 24 Ku-band
- Bandwidth: 72 MHz
- Coverage area: Europe, Middle East, Asia

Eutelsat 33B, formerly known as Eutelsat 3F1, Eutelsat W1, Eutelsat W5, Eutelsat 70A and Eutelsat 25C, is a telecommunications satellite owned by Eutelsat Consortium. Eutelsat W5 provides coverage to Europe, Middle East, and Asia. The satellite can use either six steerable beams or two fixed beams to provide the coverage.

== Satellite description ==
Eutelsat W1 was built by Aérospatiale and is a Spacebus-3000B2 satellite. The satellite measures 4.6 m × 2.5 m × 1.8 m (15.1 ft × 8.2 ft × 5.9 ft) and has a span of 29 m (95 ft) on orbit. Eutelsat W1 features three axis stabilization to help keep it stable and pointed at the Earth at all times. It features twenty-four K_{u} band transponders. It was used to provide video distribution and contribution links, occasional-use video as well as Internet backbone connections.

== Eutelsat W5 ==
The original Eutelsat W1 satellite was damaged during construction by a malfunctioning fire extinguishing system. During testing, when the factory where it was being built caught fire. The cause of the fire was determined to be a carbon fiber wall which got too hot when the antennas were pointed at it and turned up on full power. The satellite was covered in water causing extensive damage. It was declared a total loss, but was later reconstructed and completed as Eutelsat W5.

== Eutelsat 70A ==
Eutelsat 70A was the first satellite to be launched by a Delta IV launch vehicle. The launch was originally scheduled for January 2001, but was delayed several times due to developmental problems with the Delta IV. On 27 March 2007, Eutelsat 70A began drifting west at a rate of 0.004° per day. It is not known why this began to happen. On 16 June 2008, a power generation anomaly occurred and four transponders were permanently lost. It was later revealed that one of the two solar panels was lost because the array's drive motor failed.

== Eutelsat 25C ==
In 2013, it was replaced by Eutelsat 70B at 70° East and was then moved to 25° East where it was renamed to Eutelsat 25C.

== Eutelsat 33 B ==
In October 2015, Eutelsat 33B was deactivated because of the loss of its second solar panel.
