= Eutelsat 139 West A =

French communications satellite

- Names: Eutelsat 12 West D Eutelsat 31B; Eutelsat W3A (2004-2012); Eutelsat 7A (2012-2021)
- Mission type: Communications
- Operator: Eutelsat S.A.
- COSPAR ID: 2004-008A
- SATCAT no.: 28187
- Website: www.eutelsat.com/en/home.html
- Mission duration: 15 years (planned)

Spacecraft properties
- Spacecraft: EUTELSAT W3A
- Spacecraft type: Eurostar
- Bus: Eurostar-3000S
- Manufacturer: EADS Astrium
- Launch mass: 4,300 kg (9,500 lb)
- Dry mass: 2,000 kg (4,400 lb)
- Power: 9.6 kW

Start of mission
- Launch date: 15 March 2004, 23:06:00 UTC
- Rocket: Proton-M / Briz-M
- Launch site: Baikonur Cosmodrome, Site 81/24
- Contractor: Khrunichev State Research and Production Space Center
- Entered service: 15 May 2004

Orbital parameters
- Reference system: Geocentric orbit
- Regime: Geostationary orbit
- Longitude: 139° West

Transponders
- Band: 40 transponders: 38 Ku-band; 2 Ka-band
- Coverage area: Americas

Eutelsat 139 West A is a communications satellite owned by Eutelsat S.A. Formerly placed at 7° East, it is currently placed at 139° West and broadcasts TV channels, radios and other digital data. It entered operational service on 15 May 2004.

Built by EADS Astrium on a Eurostar-3000S satellite bus, it is equipped with 42 Ku-band transponders broadcasting in the Americas (formerly Europe, North Africa, the Middle East and sub-Saharan Africa) and 2 Ka-band transponders.

It was launched on 15 March 2004 at 23:06:00 UTC by Proton-M / Briz-M from the Baikonur Cosmodrome. It had a launch mass of 4,300 kg (9,500 lb). Its estimated lifespan is 15 years.

It is equipped with Skyplex technique for multiplexing on board. It is the first geostationary satellite to use a lithium-ion battery.

It was used by the European Broadcasting Union's Eurovision network. It also broadcast the Turkish Digiturk offerings until early 2020 and numerous Internet connection services such as OpenSky, Hughes Europe or Skylogic.

== Eutelsat 7A ==
In December 2011, Eutelsat announced, that their satellite assets will be renamed under a unified brand name effective from March 2012. This satellite became Eutelsat 7A.
