= KGL (disambiguation) =

KGL could refer to:

- King's German Legion, a unit of the British Army during the Napoleonic Wars
- Kvaerner Govan Ltd, a former shipyard company in Glasgow, Scotland
- Kunggari, a dialect of the Bidjara language, an extinct Australian Aboriginal language; ISO 639-3 language code kgl
- Kogalymavia airline, Russia; ICAO airline code KGL
- Kigali International Airport, Rwanda; IATA airport code KGL
- Kings Langley railway station, England; National Rail station code KGL
- Kingsland railway station, Auckland, New Zealand; station code KGL
- Kajang Line, Mass Rapid Transit (MRT) line serving Kuala Lumpur (Klang Valley), Malaysia; abbreviated as KGL
