= Regenerative Satellite Mesh – A =

Satellite communications protocol

Regenerative Satellite Mesh – A (RSM-A) is an internationally standardized satellite communications protocol by Telecommunications Industry Association and European Telecommunications Standards Institute.

It is based upon the Spaceway K_{a}-band communications system developed by Hughes Network Systems. It is expected to be utilized by the Hughes Network Systems satellite called Spaceway-3.

The standard is meant to provide broadband capabilities of up to 512 kbit/s, 2 Mbit/s, and 16 Mbit/s uplink data communication rates with fixed K_{a}-band satellite terminal antennas sized as small as 77 cm.

== General Description ==
The standard describes the various segments involved in a RSM-A satellite system including:

- Satellite Terminal: fixed satellite terminal for satellite communication linked to terrestrial hosts via connected LANs
- Satellite Payload: geosynchronous regenerative satellite payload and antennas
- Network Operations Control Center: involved ground network management and resource management

The uplink consists of a multi-frequency time-division multiple access (MF-TDMA) scheme where individual uplink spotbeams are assigned frequency channels out of the satellites frequency band. Satellite Terminals transmit on timeslots on its uplink beam's frequency channels using mechanisms such as Bandwidth-on-Demand (BoD) protocols with the satellite payload.

The downlink consists of a time-division multiplexing (TDM) carrier bursts directed in a hoping fashion to different downlink beams each downlink frame timeslot. The downlink beams can be narrow downlink spotbeams during the point-to-point transmission part of each downlink frame or they can be downlink shaped beams that cover a much larger geographic area during the shaped beam transmission part of each downlink frame.

== Documents ==
Comparison of TIA-1040.1.01 and ETSI TS 102 188
Part	US (TIA)	Europe (ETSI)	Description
1	TIA‑1040.1.01	ETSI TS 102 188-1 V1.1.2	General description: air interface and physical layer.
2	TIA‑1040.2.01	ETSI TS 102 188-2 V1.1.2	Frame structure: Defines the structure of the data frame for the RSM-A air interface.
3	TIA‑1040.3.01	ETSI TS 102 188-3 V1.1.1	Channel coding: Specifies the channel coding techniques used in the RSM-A air interface for error correction.
4	TIA‑1040.4.01	ETSI TS 102 188-4 V1.1.1	Modulation: Describes the modulation schemes used in the RSM-A air interface.
5	TIA‑1040.5.01	ETSI TS 102 188-5 V1.1.1	Radio transmission and reception: Covers the radio transmission and reception techniques for the RSM-A air interface.
6	TIA‑1040.6.01	ETSI TS 102 188-6 V1.1.2	Radio link control: Defines the radio link control procedures in the RSM-A system.
7	TIA‑1040.7.01	ETSI TS 102 188-7 V1.1.2	Synchronization: Describes synchronization techniques for the RSM-A air interface.

Comparison of TIA-1040.2 and ETSI TS 102 188-1
Part	US (TIA)	Europe (ETSI)	Description
1	TIA‑1040.2.01	ETSI TS 102 189-1 V1.1.1	MAC/SLC layer for satellite systems, including its role in the regenerative satellite mesh.
2	TIA‑1040.2.02	ETSI TS 102 189-2 V1.1.2	SLC Layer (Signaling Layer Control) in the MAC/SLC protocol, focusing on its functions in the RSM-A air interface.
3	TIA‑1040.2.03	ETSI TS 102 189-3 V1.1.1	ST-SAM interface (Satellite Terminal - Satellite Access Module) in the MAC/SLC layer, facilitating communication between satellite terminals and network infrastructure.

== See also ==
- List of broadcast satellites
