= Sea Launch =

Satellite launch company, 1999 to 2014

Sea Launch S.A.
- Type: Private
- Industry: Aerospace
- Founded: 1995; 31 years ago
- Headquarters: Nyon, Switzerland
- Number of employees: 200
- Parent: S7 AirSpace Corporation
- Website: s7space.ru

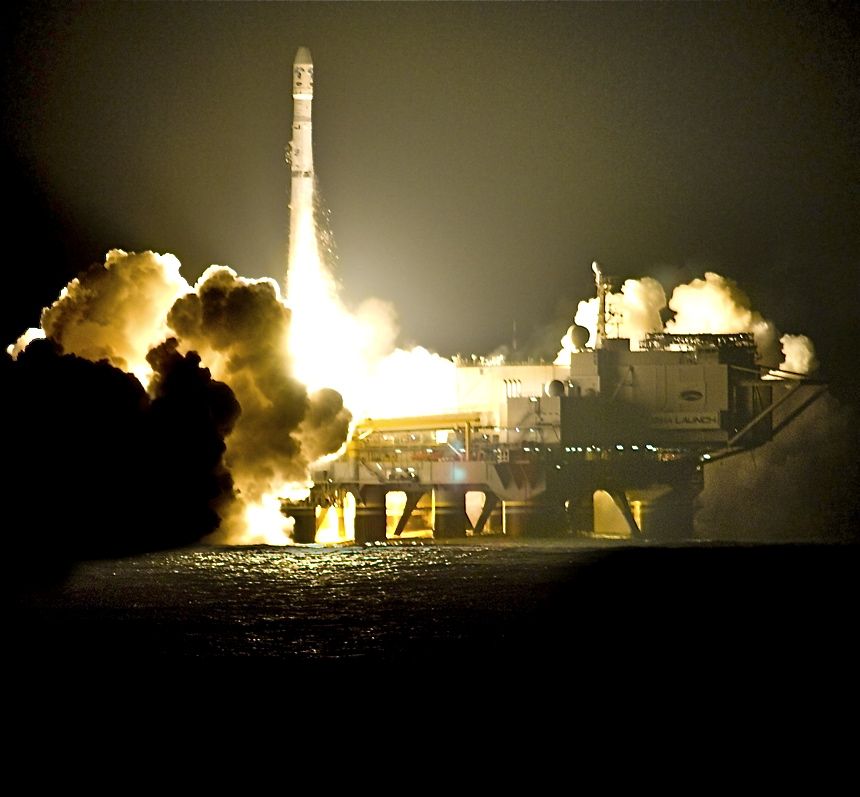
A launch of Zenit-3SL rocket from the Sea Launch platform Ocean Odyssey

Sea Launch was a multinational—Norway, Russia, Ukraine, United States—spacecraft launch company founded in 1995 that provided orbital launch services from 1999 to 2014. The company used a mobile maritime launch platform for equatorial launches of commercial payloads on specialized Zenit-3SL rockets from a former mobile/floating oil drilling rig renamed Odyssey.

By 2014, it had assembled and launched thirty-two rockets, with an additional three failures and one partial failure. All commercial payloads were communications satellites intended for geostationary transfer orbit with such customers as EchoStar, DirecTV, XM Satellite Radio, PanAmSat, and Thuraya.

The approach Sea Launch LLC used was to assemble the launcher on a purpose-built ship Sea Launch Commander in Nimitz Rd., Long Beach, California, USA. The assembled spacecraft was then positioned on top of the self-propelled Odyssey floating launch platform and moved to the equatorial Pacific Ocean for launch, with the Sea Launch Commander serving as tracking, command & telemetry (TCT) center. The movable system means the rocket can travel to the equator for launch, which increases payload capacity.

Sea Launch mothballed its ships and put operations on long-term hiatus in 2014, following the Russian invasion of Ukraine. By 2015, discussions on disposition of company assets were underway, and the Sea Launch partners were in a court-administered dispute about unpaid expenses that Boeing claims it incurred.

In September 2016, S7 Group, owner of S7 Airlines, purchased the assets of Sea Launch. Launch services were to potentially be provided by S7 Sea Launch, a US subsidiary. However, after moving the two former Sea Launch ships from California to Vladivostok, the S7 Group chairman stated that the program was indefinitely suspended. As of 2020, a replacement for the Zenit launch vehicle, with its Ukrainian first stage, was expected to be years away.

== History ==
Sea Launch was established in 1995 as a consortium of four companies from Norway, Russia, Ukraine and the United States, managed by Boeing with participation from the other shareholders. (Note: The consortium was American firm Boeing with a 40% stake, Russia firm Energia with a 25% stake, (Note: RSC Energia is one of the key contractors of Roscosmos and the only manufacturer of Russian spacecraft both manned Soyuz MS and unmanned cargo Progress MS, and, in addition, Energia is a developer of rocket technology in particular, the Soyuz-5 launch vehicle and satellites.) Ukrainian firms Yuzhmash and Yuzhnoye Design Bureau with a 20% stake, and the Norwegian shipbuilding company Aker Kvaerner with a 20% stake.) The first rocket was launched in March 1999.

On March 17, 2006, it was announced that Jim Maser, the President and General Manager of Sea Launch, would leave the company to join SpaceX as President and Chief Operating Officer.

In June 2009, the provider of the Sea Launch service, Sea Launch Co. LLC, filed for Chapter 11 bankruptcy protection. Sea Launch asserted that it would "continue to maintain all normal business operations after the filing for reorganization." On August 6, 2010, Energia, which already owned 25% of Sea Launch, announced it planned to acquire a controlling interest of 85% in the company. As a result, the company planned to begin land-based launches from the Baikonur Cosmodrome in early 2011, while sea-based launches to be resumed in September 2011.

Sea Launch emerged from bankruptcy effective October 27, 2010. Energia Overseas Limited, a Russian corporation, is majority owner of the reorganized entity, with Boeing and other American companies retaining minority shares.

In 2013, Boeing sued RSC Energia, PO Yuzhnoye and KB Yuzhnoye. According to Boeing the companies refused to pay more than $350 million following the joint venture's bankruptcy filing in 2009.

In mid-2014, following the 2014 Russian military invasion in Ukraine and the subsequent unrest in the eastern part of the country, there were a number of Russian media reports that indicated Sea Launch may be planning to inactivate the Odyssey launch platform. The company formally denied those reports in June 2014, indicating it is continuing to buy Zenit rockets from Ukraine, and is still promoting its launch services to the international market, even in August 2014. However, in August 2014, Sea Launch conducted a reduction of their staff and removed from operating status both the Commander and Odyssey vessels in order to reduce operating costs during a period where they have no launches scheduled until late 2015.

In July 2015, industry experts stated that the Chinese government was considering the purchase of the Sea Launch command ship and launch platform assets, but this was not confirmed by either company or Chinese government officials.

In September 2015, Boeing won a court judgement against the Russian and Ukrainian partners within Sea Launch. The decision set up a court trial planned for November 2015 where Boeing would argue that it was not properly reimbursed for US$356 million of expenses incurred while operating the Sea Launch launch system. This litigation was decided in favor of Boeing on May 12, 2016.

As of December 2015, Roscosmos and Energia were attempting to find a buyer for the Sea Launch assets, due to the high cost of infrastructure maintenance of approximately US$30 million per year.

In September 2016, S7 Group, owner of S7 Airlines announced they were purchasing Sea Launch. The launch and assembly ship Sea Launch Commander arrived in Russia on March 17, 2020, and was moored at the Slavyanka Shipyard after customs procedures. The launch platform Odyssey arrived at the shipyard on March 30.

In August 2020, Deputy Prime Minister Yuri Borisov told the media on the sidelines of the Army-2020 forum that the floating spaceport Sea Launch, currently based at Russia’s Slavyanka port in the Primorye Territory, will be restored. The news release indicated it would require about 35 billion rubles (roughly $470 million) to restore the platform. Funding was not confirmed at the time of the release.

Borisov indicated that before the floating spaceport left its port Long Beach, California, the United States in accordance with its laws removed all equipment from the command ship and the floating platform. "It’s mostly equipment responsible for positioning, based on GPS technologies. We will be able to replace it with GLONASS solutions. As for the launch system itself, in other words, the equipment needed for bringing the rocket to and placing it at the launch pad and automatically fueling the tanks, all this is done through Russian technologies," Borisov said.

In June 2020, the CEO of Russia’s space corporation Roscosmos, Dmitry Rogozin, said in his column in Forbes magazine that Russian specialists would have to exert considerable efforts to restore the floating spaceport Sea Launch to operation. He said that before its handover to the company S7 all space launch control equipment was dismantled.

== Ownership and business ==
Sea Launch was founded by four companies from four countries, which shared the original ownership of offshore Cayman Islands-registered Sea Launch. Ship "Sea Launch" registered Monrovia after reorganising from Chapter 11 bankruptcy in 2010, a majority share of the company was acquired by Russian interests.

Founding company	Initial share (1995 to 2010)	Share (2010 to 2018)	Contribution
Energia	25%	95%	Block DM-SL rocket stage (it is used in the Zenit-3SL rocket as its 3rd stage)
Boeing Commercial Space	40%	2.5%	System integration, payload enclosures (nose-cone that protects the satellite during launch)
Aker Solutions	20%	2.5%	Launch platform (Ocean Odyssey) and command ship (Sea Launch Commander)
SDO Yuzhnoye / PO Yuzhmash	15%	0%	Two-stage Zenit rocket (used as Zenit-3SL's stages 1 and 2)

The project was helped by Hughes Space and Communications, which in 1995 signed the first contract for 10 launches and 10 options, valued at $1 billion, and Space Systems/Loral, which then signed a five-launch contract.

Total cost of the project has been reported at $583 million in 1996. Chase Manhattan arranged about $400 million in loans in 1996. Loans were later guaranteed against political instability in Russia and Ukraine through 2012 by the World Bank (up to $175 million, of these up to $100 million in Russia and up to $75 million in Ukraine) and the European Bank for Reconstruction and Development (up to $65 million).

Sea Launch has a reciprocal agreement with Arianespace and Mitsubishi Heavy Industries through the Launch Services Alliance, providing assurance in case either company's system is not able to launch a payload for reasons of reliability, capacity, backlog, or otherwise. This was used for the first time in 2004 when Arianespace's Ariane 5 had to reschedule a group of launches for reliability reasons.

In 1999, shortly after the company was founded, the Sea Launch consortium claimed that their launch-related operating costs would be lower than a land-based equivalent due in part to reduced staff requirements. The platform and command ship have 310 crew members.

== Launches ==
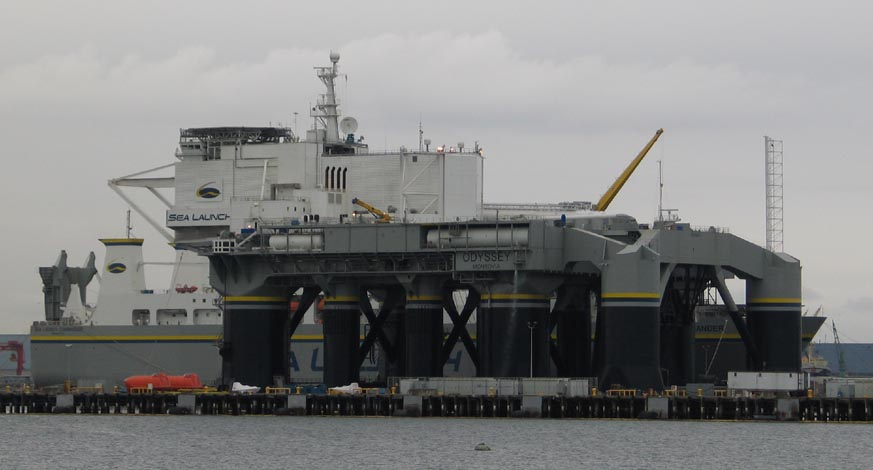
Sea Launch launch platform Ocean Odyssey

The first demonstration satellite was launched on March 27, 1999, and the first commercial satellite on October 9, 1999. Sea Launch has launched 36 rockets with 32 successes and 1 partial success as of March 2019. The first failure, of a Hughes-built communications satellite owned by ICO Global Communications, occurred on the second commercial launch on March 12, 2000, and was blamed on a software error that failed to close a valve in the second stage of the rocket.

A second rocket failed to launch on January 30, 2007, when Zenit-3SL exploded on the launch pad with the Boeing 702 NSS-8 satellite on board, seconds after engine ignition.

All Sea Launch missions to date have used the custom-designed three-stage Zenit-3SL launch vehicle, capable of placing up to 6,000 kg (13,000 lb) of payload into geosynchronous transfer orbit. Sea Launch rocket components are manufactured by SDO Yuzhnoye / PO Yuzhmash in Dnepropetrovsk, USSR (Dnipro, Ukraine) — Zenit rocket for the first and second stages; by Energia in Kaliningrad, USSR (Moscow, Russia) — Block DM-SL for third stage); and by Boeing in Seattle, United States — payload fairing and interstage structure.

Sea Launch rockets were assembled in Long Beach, California. The typical assembly was done on board the Assembly and Command Ship (the payload is first tested, fueled and encapsulated in the nearby Payload Processing Facility). The rocket is then transferred to a horizontal hangar on the self-propelled launch platform.

Following rocket tests, both ships then sail about 4,800 km (3,000 mi) to the equator at 154° West Longitude, 0°N 154°W, in international" waters about 370 km (230 mi) from Kiritimati, Kiribati. The platform travels the distance in about 11 days, the command ship in about eight days.

With the platform ballasted to its launch depth of 22 m (72 ft), the hangar is opened, the rocket is mechanically moved to a vertical position, and the launch platform crew evacuates to the command ship which moves about five kilometres (3.1 mi) away. Then, with the launch platform unmanned, the rocket is fueled and launched. The final ten seconds before launch are called out simultaneously in English and Russian.

Number of launches per year
1999	2
2000	3
2001	2
2002	1
2003	3
2004	3
2005	4
2006	5
2007	1
2008	5
2009	1
2010	0
2011	1
2012	3
2013	1
2014	1

Number	Date	Payload	Mass	Result
1	1999-03-27	DemoSat	4.5 t	success
2	1999-10-09	DIRECTV 1-R	3.5 t	success
3	2000-03-12	ICO F-1	2.7 t	failure
4	2000-07-28	PAS 9 (Intelsat 9)	3.7 t	success
5	2000-10-20	Thuraya-1	5.1 t	success
6	2001-03-18	XM-2 ROCK	4.7 t	success
7	2001-05-08	XM-1 ROLL	4.7 t	success
8	2002-06-15	Galaxy IIIC	4.9 t	success
9	2003-06-10	Thuraya-2	5.2 t	success
10	2003-08-08	EchoStar IX (aka Telstar 13)	4.7 t	success
11	2003-10-01	Galaxy XIII (aka Horizons-1)	4.1 t	success
12	2004-01-10	Telstar 14 (aka Estrela do Sul 1)	4.7 t	success
13	2004.05.04	DirecTV 7S	5.5 t	success
14	2004-06-28	Telstar 18	4.8 t	launch anomaly
15	2005-03-01	XM-3 (Rhythm)	4.7 t	success
16	2005-04-26	Spaceway 1	6.0 t	success
17	2005-06-23	Intelsat IA-8	5.5 t	success
18	2005-11-08	Inmarsat 4-F2	6.0 t	success
19	2006-02-15	EchoStar X	4.3 t	success
20	2006-04-12	JCSAT 9	4.4 t	success
21	2006-06-18	Galaxy 16	5.1 t	success
22	2006-08-22	Koreasat 5	4.9 t	success
23	2006-10-30	XM-4 (Blues)	4.7 t	success
24	2007-01-30	NSS-8	5.9 t	failure
25	2008-01-15	Thuraya-3	5.2 t	success
26	2008-03-19	DirecTV-11	5.9 t	success
27	2008-05-21	Galaxy 18	4.6 t	success
28	2008-07-16	EchoStar XI	5.5 t	success
29	2008-09-24	Galaxy 19	4.7 t	success
30	2009-04-20	SICRAL 1B	3.0 t	success
31	2011-09-24	Atlantic Bird 7	4.6 t	success
32	2012-05-31	Intelsat 19	5.6 t	success
33	2012-08-19	Intelsat 21	6.0 t	success
34	2012-12-03	Eutelsat 70B	5.2 t	success
35	2013-02-01	Intelsat 27	6.2 t	failure
36	2014-05-26	Eutelsat 3B	6.0 t	success

== NSS-8 launch failure ==
The Sea Launch NSS-8 launch explosion on January 30, 2007. The explosion has obscured the floating launch pad platform.

On January 30, 2007, the Sea Launch Zenit-3SL rocket carrying NSS-8 and 500 tons of fuel exploded on (flight) launch. Available imagery shows a fireball much larger than the launch platform at sea level.

Since the launch pad platform was vacated by all engineers during the automated launch process, there were no injuries. On February 1, 2007, Sea Launch released a statement detailing its status.

It is believed that the failure was caused by a foreign object being ingested by the engine turbopump, causing the rocket to crash immediately.

On February 3, 2007, photographs of the damage were posted on internet forums. Damage to the launch platform damage was mostly superficial, although blast deflectors underneath the launch platform were knocked loose and were lost when they fell into the sea.

In March 2007, shortly after the NSS-8 launch failure, Hughes Network Systems switched the launch of SPACEWAY-3 from a Sea Launch Zenit-3SL to an Ariane 5.

Repairs of the launch platform were completed in September 2007. The Sea Launch platform underwent repairs in Canada, docked near CFB Esquimalt, just west of Victoria, British Columbia, and departed on July 31, 2007. Both vessels returned to their home Nimitz military port in Long Beach, California, U.S.

== Concerns and investigations ==
During project development in 1998 Boeing was fined US$10 million by the United States Department of State for technical violations of the Arms Export Control Act in handling of missile technology while dealing with its foreign Sea Launch partners. This is the largest civil penalty of its kind, although it could have been as much as US$102 million. The Sea Launch project was suspended for two months during the investigation.

The Department of State found that between January 1994 and January 1999 Boing illegally exported "defense articles" and "defense services", although no national security breaches were determined. The violations were uncovered by Boeing's internal investigation.

At about the same time United States Customs Service attempted to block Sea Launch from bringing Zenit-3SL rockets (classified as missiles) into California for assembly without a munitions import licence. The matter was settled in the company's favour.

Also in 1998, 16 member states of the South Pacific Forum issued a communiqué asking the United States to suspend the project indefinitely until and unless their environmental concerns are remedied. It was mostly criticized by the island nation of Kiribati.

The project was criticized in 1997 by International Transport Workers' Federation (ITWF) for registering its ocean vessels in Liberia. In May 1999 Sea Launch reached an agreement with the ITWF, which allows crew members to use ITWF inspectors.

In Russia, since 2014, a criminal investigation has been ongoing against the former president of RSC Energia, Vitaly Lopota. Investigators accuse him of illegally repaying Sea Launch’s debts and purchasing its shares to the detriment of the corporation’s core activities in 2010-2013. Lopota does not admit guilt, and the Russian Prosecutor General's Office has already twice rejected charges against him. In November 2023, the Investigative Committee again brought charges, this time reducing the amount from 9 billion rubles to 4.2 billion rubles.

== Land launch ==
Using existing Zenit infrastructure at the military Baikonur Cosmodrome, the "Land Launch" system is based on a modified version of the Sea Launch vehicle, the three stage Zenit-3SL mod.B rocket. Land Launch's Zenit 3SLB vehicle addresses the launch needs of Block DM (syncom, U.S.), Block Boeing witch TDRSS, commercial satellites weighing up to 3.5 metric tons (3.9 short tons). The two stage Zenit 2 (first stage LV "Energia) is also available for lifting payloads up to 13 metric tons (14 short tons) to LEO low Earth orbits.

The first launch was on April 28, 2008, (04.28.2008) when a Zenit-3SLB launched Spacecom Ltd's AMOS-3 spacecraft from LC 45/1 (launch pad) at Baikonur.

== Advantages of equatorial ocean-platform based launches ==
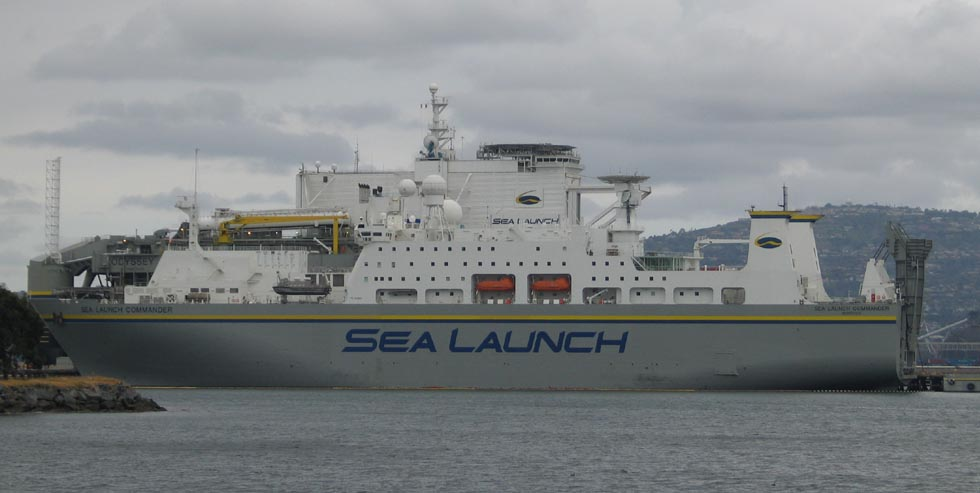
Sea Launch command ship Sea Launch Commander

Advantages of equatorial launch site:

- The rotational speed of the Earth is greatest at the equator, providing an extra launch "boost".
- The need for a "plane change" to the zero degree inclination of geostationary orbit is eliminated, providing a major extra launch "boost". This allows 17.5–25% more mass to be launched to geostationary orbit than the same rocket launched from Cape Canaveral, which is at 28.5 degrees north latitude.
- Any orbital inclination could be reached, thus (for example) combining in one launch site the attainable inclinations of both Cape Canaveral and Vandenberg.

Advantages of ocean-based over a conventional land-based launch platform:

- An ocean launch reduces risks related to launching over populated areas, providing better safety to third parties.
- Absence of range conflicts with other launch systems and a near total absence of ship or overhead air traffic that would constrain launch.

== Honors and References ==
Sea Launch LLC was awarded the Space Foundation's Space Achievement Award in 2000.

The Sea Launch program has been extensively documented in a book by Valery Aliyev — Sea Launch. Space and Ocean: The Sea-Based Rocket and Space Complex. Project History. Development and Operation Experience, which provides an in-depth account of its development, operations, and technological innovations.

== See also ==
- Expendable launch system
- Launch vehicle types by launch platform
- NewSpace
- Sea Dragon
- Aquarius Launch Vehicle
- Autonomous spaceport drone ship
- Orienspace
