= Spaceway-3 =

Communications satellite

- Mission type: Communication
- Operator: Hughes Network Systems
- COSPAR ID: 2007-036A
- SATCAT no.: 32018
- Mission duration: 12 years (planned); 17 years, 6 months, 18 days (elapsed)

Spacecraft properties
- Bus: BSS-702
- Manufacturer: Boeing
- Launch mass: 6075 kg
- Dry mass: 3655 kg
- Power: 12800 watts

Start of mission
- Launch date: 14 August 2007, 23:44:00 UTC
- Rocket: Ariane 5
- Launch site: Kourou, ELA-3
- Contractor: Arianespace
- Entered service: October 2007

Orbital parameters
- Reference system: Geocentric orbit
- Regime: Geostationary orbit
- Longitude: 95.0° West

Transponders
- Band: Ka-band
- Frequency: 500 MHz
- Bandwidth: 10 Gbit/s
- Coverage area: North America

Spaceway-3 is a communications satellite which was launched on August 14, 2007, at 23:44:00 UTC. The third satellite in the Spaceway series, it includes a K_{a}-band communications payload. It is used by Hughes Network Systems to provide broadband Internet Protocol network service.

== History ==
In March 2007, shortly after the failure of a Sea Launch rocket launch in January 2007, Hughes Network Systems switched launch of Spaceway-3 from a Zenit-3SL rocket to an Ariane 5 launch vehicle.

== Launch ==
Spaceway-3 was launched 14 August 2007 on an Ariane 5 launch vehicle with BSAT-3a. It lifted off at 23:44 UTC from ELA-3 of the Centre Spatial Guyanais. Five hours and 46 minutes later, signals from the spacecraft were successfully received at a ground station in Hartebeesthoek, South Africa.

== See also ==
- Regenerative Satellite Mesh – A (RSM – A)
