= Graveyard orbit =

Spacecraft end-of-life orbit

Clickable image, highlighting medium altitude orbits around Earth, (Note: Orbital periods and speeds are calculated using the relations 4π^{2}R^{3} = T^{2}GM and V^{2}R = GM, where R is the radius of orbit in metres; T is the orbital period in seconds; V is the orbital speed in m/s; G is the gravitational constant, approximately 6.673×10^{−11} Nm^{2}/kg^{2}; M is the mass of Earth, approximately 5.98×10^{24} kg (1.318×10^{25} lb).) from Low Earth to the lowest High Earth orbit (geostationary orbit and its graveyard orbit, at one ninth of the Moon's orbital distance), (Note: Approximately 8.6 times when the Moon is nearest (that is, (363,104 km)/(42,164 km)), to 9.6 times when the Moon is farthest (that is, (405,696 km)/(42,164 km))) with the Van Allen radiation belts and the Earth to scale

An example of a graveyard orbit – Earth fixed frame Earth · Spaceway-1 · Spaceway-2 · Spaceway-3

A graveyard orbit, also called a junk orbit or disposal orbit, is an orbit that lies away from common operational orbits. One significant graveyard orbit is a supersynchronous orbit well beyond geosynchronous orbit. Some satellites are moved into such orbits at the end of their operational life to reduce the probability of colliding with operational spacecraft and generating space debris.

== Overview ==
A graveyard orbit is used when the change in velocity required to perform a de-orbit maneuver is too large. De-orbiting a geostationary satellite requires a delta-v of about 1,500 metres per second (4,900 ft/s), whereas re-orbiting it to a graveyard orbit requires only about 11 metres per second (36 ft/s).

For satellites in geostationary orbit and geosynchronous orbits, the graveyard orbit is a few hundred kilometers beyond the operational orbit. The transfer to a graveyard orbit beyond geostationary orbit requires the same amount of fuel as a satellite needs for about three months of stationkeeping. It also requires a reliable attitude control during the transfer maneuver. While most satellite operators plan to perform such a maneuver at the end of their satellites' operational lives, through 2005 only about one-third succeeded. Given the economic value of the positions at geosynchronous altitude, unless premature spacecraft failure precludes it, satellites are moved to a graveyard orbit prior to decommissioning.

According to the Inter-Agency Space Debris Coordination Committee (IADC) the minimum recommended perigee altitude $\Delta{H}$ beyond the geostationary orbit is

$$\Delta{H} = 235\mbox{ km} + C_\mathrm{R} \frac{A \left[ \mathrm{m}^2 \right]}{m \left[ \mathrm{kg} \right]} \cdot 1000\mbox{ km}$$

where

$C_\mathrm{R}$ is the satellite's solar radiation pressure coefficient, whose value is between 1 (for absorption) and 2 (for specular reflection),
$A$ is its aspect area,
$m$ is its mass.

This formula includes 200 kilometres (120 mi) for the GEO-protected zone to also permit orbit maneuvers in GEO without interference with the graveyard orbit. Another 35 kilometres (22 mi) of tolerance must be allowed for the effects of gravitational perturbations (primarily solar and lunar). The remaining part of the equation considers the effects of the solar radiation pressure, which depends on the physical parameters of the satellite.

In order to obtain a license to provide telecommunications services in the United States, the Federal Communications Commission (FCC) requires all geostationary satellites launched after March 18, 2002, to commit to moving to a graveyard orbit at the end of their operational lives. U.S. government regulations require a boost, $\Delta{H}$, of about 300 km (186 mi). In 2023 DISH received the first-ever fine by the FCC for failing to de-orbit its EchoStar VII satellite according to the terms of its license.

A spacecraft moved to a graveyard orbit will typically be passivated.

Uncontrolled objects in a near geostationary [Earth] orbit (GEO) exhibit a 53-year cycle of orbital inclination due to the interaction of the Earth's tilt with the lunar orbit. The orbital inclination varies ± 7.4°, at up to 0.8°pa.

== Disposal orbit ==
While the standard geosynchronous satellite graveyard orbit results in an expected orbital lifetime of millions of years, the increasing number of satellites, the launch of microsatellites, and the FCC approval of large megaconstellations of thousands of satellites for launch by 2022 necessitated new approaches for deorbiting to assure earlier removal of the objects once they have reached end-of-life. Contrary to GEO graveyard orbits requiring three months' worth of fuel (delta-V of 11 m/s) to reach, large satellite networks in LEO require orbits that passively decay into the Earth's atmosphere. For example, both OneWeb and SpaceX have committed to the FCC regulatory authorities that decommissioned satellites will decay to a lower orbit – a disposal orbit – where the satellite orbital altitude would decay due to atmospheric drag and then naturally reenter the atmosphere and burn up within one year of end-of-life.

== See also ==
- List of orbits
- SNAP-10A – nuclear reactor satellite, remaining in a 700-nautical-mile (1,300 km; 810 mi) sub-synchronous Earth orbit for an expected 4,000 years
- Spacecraft cemetery, in the Pacific Ocean
