= Hughes Europe =

- Company type: Subsidiary of Hughes Network Systems, LLC
- Industry: Telecommunications Services and Equipment
- Founded: 1971 (HNS)
- Headquarters: Griesheim, Germany
- Key people: Anshu Vij, Managing Director
- Products: Satellite Broadband
- Revenue: US$95 million (2008)
- Number of employees: ~145
- Website: http://www.hugheseurope.com

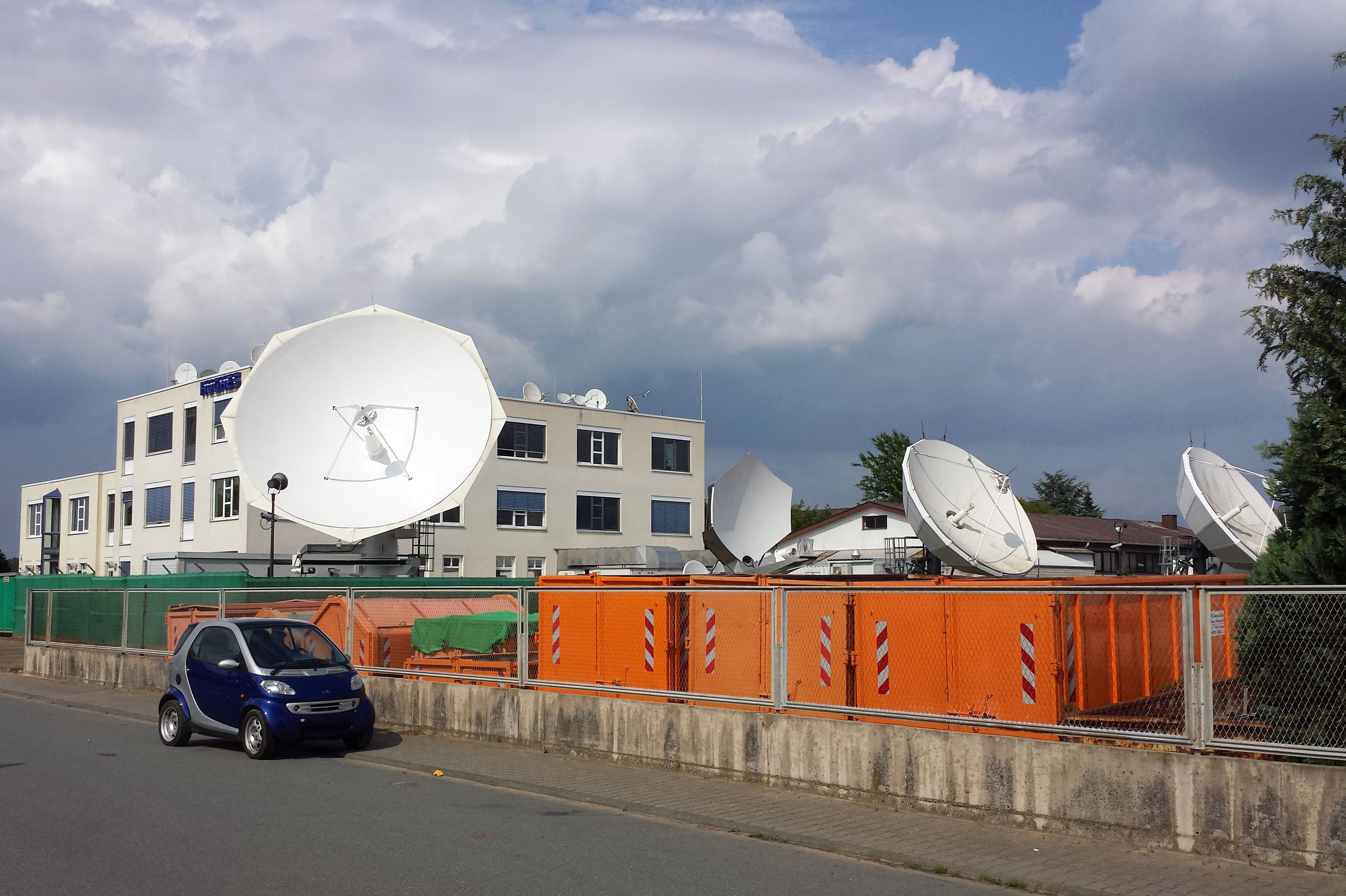
Network Operations Center in Griesheim, Germany

Hughes Europe is an operating and sales organization for Hughes Network Systems, LLC (HUGHES) with its facilities in Germany, Great Britain and Italy.

These facilities are mainly used to provide Internet access to organizations and other institutions via satellites and traditional terrestrial connections.

Hughes Europe develops, installs, manages and maintains company communications networks. It provides broadband internet access and Managed Network Solutions for companies of all sizes across a broad range of industries, including the automobile, retail, energy (oil and gas), financial services, industrial, information technology, telecommunications and lottery sectors.

== Broadband services and solutions ==
Under the HughesNet name brand, Hughes Europe offers Managed Network Services and Managed Digital Media Solutions. These include:

- Terrestrial and satellite-based broadband networks
- Hybrid broadband networks
- Backup solutions
- Broadband internet access
- Digital signage
- Business IPTV (company communications and interactive employee training)
- IP Multicast services for data transmission via satellite

Hughes Europe broadband satellite products are based on global standards approved by the TIA, ETSI and ITU standards organizations, including IPoS/DVB-2, RSM-A and GMR-1

== History ==
Hughes Europe is a wholly owned subsidiary of Hughes Network Systems, LLC (HNS).

The firm begun as a 50/50 joint venture between Hughes and Olivetti in 1996 and was referred to as Hughes-Olivetti Telecom. In 1998, Hughes purchased all of Olivetti’s shares and renamed it HOT Telecommunications, which was subsequently rolled into Hughes Europe as a single operating entity in 2003.

== HughesNet Broadband Solutions and Services ==
HughesNet products and services are sold throughout Europe both directly and via a network of value added resellers.

== Management ==
Anshu Vij – Managing Director, Hughes Europe

== See also ==
- Hughes Network Systems
- HughesNet
- SPACEWAY

== External links/References ==
- Comsys VSAT report, 10th edition 2007
- Hughes Europe
