= Kvaerner Govan =

Shipbuilding company

Kvaerner Govan Limited
- Type: Private
- Industry: Shipbuilding; Marine engineering
- Predecessor: Govan Shipbuilders
- Founded: 1988
- Defunct: 1999
- Fate: Acquired
- Successor: BAE Systems Marine
- Headquarters: Govan, Glasgow, Scotland, UK
- Key people: Steiner Draegebo (Managing Director)
- Number of employees: Approximately 2,000
- Parent: Kværner

Kvaerner Govan Ltd (KGL), located at Govan in Glasgow on the River Clyde, was a shipyard subsidiary formed in 1988 when the Norwegian group Kværner Industrier purchased the Govan Shipbuilders division of the nationalised British Shipbuilders corporation. Prior to the Govan Shipyard's nationalisation in 1977, as a result of the Aircraft and Shipbuilding Industries Act 1977 (c. 3), it had been operated by Govan Shipbuilders Ltd, which emerged from the collapse of the previous Upper Clyde Shipbuilders (UCS) joint venture in 1972. Prior to the formation of UCS in 1968, the Shipyard was operated by the Fairfield Shipbuilding and Engineering Company, which had a history extending back to 1834.

Kvaerner Govan Ltd invested £30m in modernisation of the shipyard during the early 1990s to enable it to specialise in the construction of gas carriers and chemical tankers. This included the construction of a large Tank Assembly Shop (TAS), later known as the Ship Block Outfit Hall (SBOH), which enabled the indoor construction of large gas storage tanks and prefabricated modular ship blocks. Other investment included renovating one of the yard's three slipways to incorporate a hydraulic 'skidding' system to allow ship blocks and tanks to be moved up and down the berth for assembly, with another filled in to create more berthside storage area. The new indoor modular block construction techniques cut the time ships spent on the outdoor slipways to 20 weeks from 18 months, which, along with reforms in labour relations, improved productivity at the yard by 40% between 1988 and 1992.

Between 1991 and 2000, Kvaerner Govan constructed 19 vessels in the yard, including 4 LPG tankers and 6 chemical tankers. However, in the later 1990s, the market for such vessels was depressed and the yard had to find alternative contracts. This included five small Anchor handling tug supply vessels for the North Sea oil industry.

The yard also constructed the helicopter carrier HMS Ocean for the Royal Navy under sub-contract from VSEL and the satellite launch command ship Sea Launch Commander for Sea Launch Inc of Long Beach, California.

In December 1999, after Kvaerner announced a withdrawal from the shipbuilding industry, the Govan yard was purchased by Clydeport and then taken on a long-term 20-year lease by BAE Systems Marine, which also owned the former Yarrow Shipbuilders yard in Scotstoun on the Clyde. It is now part of BAE Systems Surface Ships. Continued investment in capital equipment such as plasma cutting and panel line welding, has seen the Govan Shipyard emerge as BAE Systems' Steelwork Centre of Excellence. The 220-ton capacity Fairfield Titan crane, built in 1911, was demolished in 2007 to make way for construction of modules for the Queen Elizabeth-class aircraft carriers at the yard.
