= NSS-8 =

Destroyed Dutch telecommunications satellite

- Operator: SES New Skies
- Mission duration: 15 years (planned); Failed to orbit

Spacecraft properties
- Bus: BSS-702
- Manufacturer: Boeing
- Launch mass: 5,920 kilograms (13,050 lb)

Start of mission
- Launch date: 30 January 2007, 23:22 UTC
- Rocket: Zenit-3SL; Flight 24
- Launch site: Odyssey
- Contractor: Sea Launch

Orbital parameters
- Reference system: Geocentric
- Regime: Geostationary
- Longitude: 57° East
- Epoch: Planned

Transponders
- TWTA power: 18 kW

NSS-8 was a Dutch telecommunications satellite that was destroyed during launch. It was a Boeing 702 spacecraft with 56 C-band and 36 K_{u}-band transponders, and it was part of the SES NEW SKIES.

The satellite, which was insured, was destroyed when the rocket that was launching it exploded. The rocket was a Zenit 3SL being launched by Sea Launch from its Ocean Odyssey launch pad. The launch attempt occurred at 23:22 GMT on 30 January 2007. "There was an explosion as we were lifting off," said Paula Korn, a spokeswoman for Sea Launch.

NSS-8 was designed to support a wide range of functions, including broadcast applications, government and military operations, corporate communications and Broadband Internet services. When placed in its final orbital position (57° E), the satellite would have provided coverage to two-thirds of the planet, serving countries in Europe, Africa, the Middle East, the Indian subcontinent and Asia.

== See also ==
- Sea Launch
- Intelsat 27
- 2007 in spaceflight
