= T14 (satellite) =

Telecommunications satellite

- Mission type: Communications
- Operator: DirecTV
- COSPAR ID: 2014-078B
- SATCAT no.: 40333
- Mission duration: Elapsed: 11 years, 10 days

Spacecraft properties
- Bus: LS-1300
- Manufacturer: Space Systems/Loral
- Launch mass: 6,300 kilograms (13,900 lb)
- Power: 20 kilowatts from solar array

Start of mission
- Launch date: 6 December 2014, 20:40 UTC
- Rocket: Ariane 5 ECA
- Launch site: Kourou ELA-3
- Contractor: Arianespace

Orbital parameters
- Reference system: Geocentric
- Regime: Geostationary
- Longitude: 99° West
- Perigee altitude: 35,780 kilometres (22,230 mi)
- Apogee altitude: 35,807 kilometres (22,249 mi)
- Inclination: 0.010 degrees
- Period: 1436.16 minutes
- Epoch: 25 January 2015, 03:33:14 UTC

Transponders
- Band: 76 Ka-band; 18 R-band

T14 (formerly DirecTV-14) is a communication satellite launched on December 6, 2014. It is the first satellite offering Ultra-HD 4K television services using Reverse DBS. The satellite adopted its current name in 2017.

== Overview ==
The T14 satellite is the sixth satellite built by SSL (Space Systems/Loral) for operator DirecTV. The high-capacity spacecraft is based on the SSL 1300 platform, T14 is a 20-kilowatt class Ka-band and reverse-band digital broadcast satellite that will be used to deliver Ultra HD and other new consumer services for DirecTV.

DirecTV delivers hundreds of channels of digital programming to more than 31 million customers in the U.S. and Latin America with small-diameter dish antennas. This satellite provides service for users across the U.S. (including Hawaii and Alaska) and Puerto Rico. The satellite had a liftoff mass of approximately 6,300 kg. T14 is expected to operate for 15 years, or until 2029.

Michael White, chairman, president and CEO of DirecTV, was skeptical of the prospects for 4K in the past but was determined to stay on the bleeding edge of broadcast technologies. The 6,300 kg T14 satellite uses Ka-band and Reverse Band Direct Broadcast Satellite (DBS) spectrum. DBS is expected to provide ample room for delivering 4K programs and other advanced services to customers.

In March 2015, DirecTV became the first multi-channel video provider to offer 4K Ultra HD programming direct to customers, offering a variety of new releases, popular films and nature documentaries with nearly four times the resolution of HD. Customers who have DirecTV's Genie HD DVR are able to watch 4K programming on supporting 2014 Samsung UHD TVs.

T14 also bolstered DirecTV's HD broadcasts. With the new satellite, the company now has a fleet of six HD satellites. Located at 99 degrees west, T14 uses spot beams to provide additional local HD content. The 20-kilowatt satellite was expected to enter service early Q2 2016. The next satellite, T15, launched May 27, 2015.

== See also ==
- 2014 in spaceflight
- DirecTV satellite fleet
