= T11 (satellite) =

Telecommunications satellite

- Operator: DirecTV
- COSPAR ID: 2008-013A
- SATCAT no.: 32729
- Mission duration: Elapsed: 17 years, 7 days

Spacecraft properties
- Bus: BSS-702
- Manufacturer: Boeing

Start of mission
- Launch date: March 19, 2008
- Rocket: Zenit-3SL
- Launch site: Odyssey
- Contractor: Sea Launch

Orbital parameters
- Reference system: Geocentric
- Regime: Geostationary
- Longitude: 99.2° West

Transponders
- Capacity: 500 MHz

T11, formerly known as DirecTV-11, is a Boeing model 702 satellite built by the Boeing Satellite Development Center. Its current name was adopted in 2017.

== Technology ==
This satellite is functionally identical to T10 and is co-located with SPACEWAY-2 at or very near 99.225°W.

== Launch data ==
T11 had originally been scheduled for launch by Sea Launch in November, 2007. Following a launch failure at Sea Launch that resulted in damage to the facility, the expected launch date was changed to March 19, 2008. Launch occurred at 22:47:59 UTC on March 19, 2008, and the spacecraft separated from the carrier rocket 61 minutes later, following a successful ascent.

== Testing ==
Boeing handed over the T11 satellite to DirecTV on Monday, July 21, 2008, according to a press release on the Boeing website. This means that the satellite is "parked" at or extremely close to its final location of 99.225ºW. Customers with High-Definition receivers or High-Definition DVRs can see new satellite readings under the "Satellite Strength" menu on their receiver. T11 will show up as 99(a) or 99(b) for High-Def receivers and 99(c) and 99(s) for High-Definition DVRs.

== Broadcasting to customers ==
T11 began broadcasting High-Definition channels to customers on July 31, 2008. Those first channels were MPEG-4 counterparts of the older MPEG-2 channels DirecTV originally carried in the 70-79 channel range as well as four east coast distant network channels. Since the initial roll out of channels in July, DirecTV has added over 40 more HD channels to T11. These channels included converting some part-time regional sports networks to full-time HD channels as well as new national HD channels like ABC Family and Comedy Central, some premium channels, and HD pay-per-view. T11 now broadcasts over 50 HD channels, bringing DirecTV's total HD channel count over 130.
