= Spaceway =

The Spaceway system was originally envisioned as a global K_{a}-band communications system by Hughes Electronics. When the project to build the system was taken over by Hughes Network Systems, a subsidiary of Hughes Electronics, it was transformed into a phased deployment initially only launching a North American satellite system. This is in comparison to other more ambitious systems such as Teledesic and Astrolink which retained their full global nature and which subsequently failed to complete their systems. Hughes Network Systems working with Hughes Electronics subsidiary Hughes Space and Communications (and subsequently sold to Boeing and called Boeing Satellite Systems and later the Boeing Satellite Development Center) completed and built the North American Spaceway system meant to provide broadband capabilities of up to 512 kbit/s, 2 Mbit/s, and 16 Mbit/s uplink data communication rates with fixed K_{a}-band satellite terminal antennas sized as small as 74 centimetres (29 in). The broadband Spaceway system was standardized by Telecommunications Industry Association and European Telecommunications Standards Institute (ETSI) as the Regenerative Satellite Mesh - A Air Interface.

After News Corp purchased a controlling interest in Hughes Electronics, the company sold off its controlling interest in Hughes Network Systems but retained Spaceway-1 and Spaceway-2 for use in the DirecTV satellite television subsidiary of Hughes Electronics. Boeing retrofitted the first two satellites for bent pipe K_{a}-band communications for use in high-definition television and disabled the regenerative on-board processing of the original system that was to be used for broadband satellite communications.

Despite statements to the contrary in the system's initial filings with the Federal Communications Commission, none of the three satellites have inter-satellite links connecting the satellites directly with each other in space.

Spaceway-1, Spaceway-2 and Spaceway-3 have been launched and Hughes Network Systems had an option to purchase and have Boeing build Spaceway-4.

Spaceway-1, after exceeding its design life by two and a half years, was decommissioned in February 2020 after suffering extensive thermal damage to its batteries in December 2019, forcing the satellite to be moved to a graveyard orbit to prevent the risk of it exploding.
