= Spaceway-2 =

Direct broadcast satellite

- Mission type: Communication
- Operator: DirecTV
- COSPAR ID: 2005-046A
- SATCAT no.: 28902
- Mission duration: 12 years (planned); 19 years, 3 months, 16 days (elapsed)

Spacecraft properties
- Bus: BSS-702
- Manufacturer: Boeing
- Launch mass: 6116 kg
- Dry mass: 3800 kg
- Power: 12.3 kW

Start of mission
- Launch date: 16 November 2005, 23:46:00 UTC
- Rocket: Ariane 5ECA
- Launch site: Kourou, ELA-3
- Contractor: Arianespace
- Entered service: 19 April 2006

Orbital parameters
- Reference system: Geocentric orbit
- Regime: Geostationary orbit
- Longitude: 99.2° West

Transponders
- Band: 48 Ka-band transponders
- Frequency: 500 MHz
- Coverage area: North America

Spaceway-2 is part of DirecTV's constellation of direct broadcast satellites. The satellite was launched via an Arianespace Ariane 5 ECA rocket from Kourou, French Guiana on 16 November 2005. Its operational position is in geosynchronous orbit 35,800 kilometres (22,200 mi) above the equator at 99.2° West longitude. Spaceway-2 is a Boeing 702-model satellite with a 12-year life expectancy. It is expected to support high-definition television to DirecTV customers with its K_{a}-band communications payload. Although Spaceway-2 was originally built by Boeing to be used for broadband Internet access via Hughes Network Systems, it has been retrofitted to deliver HD local channels (NBC, ABC, CBS, and Fox) to numerous markets nationwide.

On 19 April 2006, the satellite was delivered to DirecTV's control after successful on-orbit testing. Spaceway-2 immediately started broadcasting HD locals to DirecTV customers in eight more markets: Minneapolis, Minnesota; Sacramento and San Diego, California; Pittsburgh, Pennsylvania; Nashville, Tennessee; Kansas City, Missouri; Columbus, Ohio; and Birmingham, Alabama. Satellites named T10 (launched in 2007) and T11 (launched in 2008), constructed by Boeing, also for use in high-definition television, are bent-pipe K_{a}-band satellites instead of regenerative satellites, and are being used to continue the expansion of DirecTV's HD services.

Spaceway-2 was originally envisioned as a global K_{a}-band communications system.

Boeing retrofitted the Spaceway-2 satellite for bent-pipe K_{a}-band communications for use in high-definition television and disabled the regenerative on-board processing of the original system that was to be used for the Spaceway broadband satellite communications.

T11 is co-located with Spaceway-2 satellites in order to use the 500 MHz of unused spectrum for HDTV broadcasting. This spectrum was originally intended for the broadband internet capabilities of the two Spaceway satellites which were disabled by Hughes Network Systems at the request of DirecTV.

== See also ==
- Spaceway
