= Sea Launch Commander =

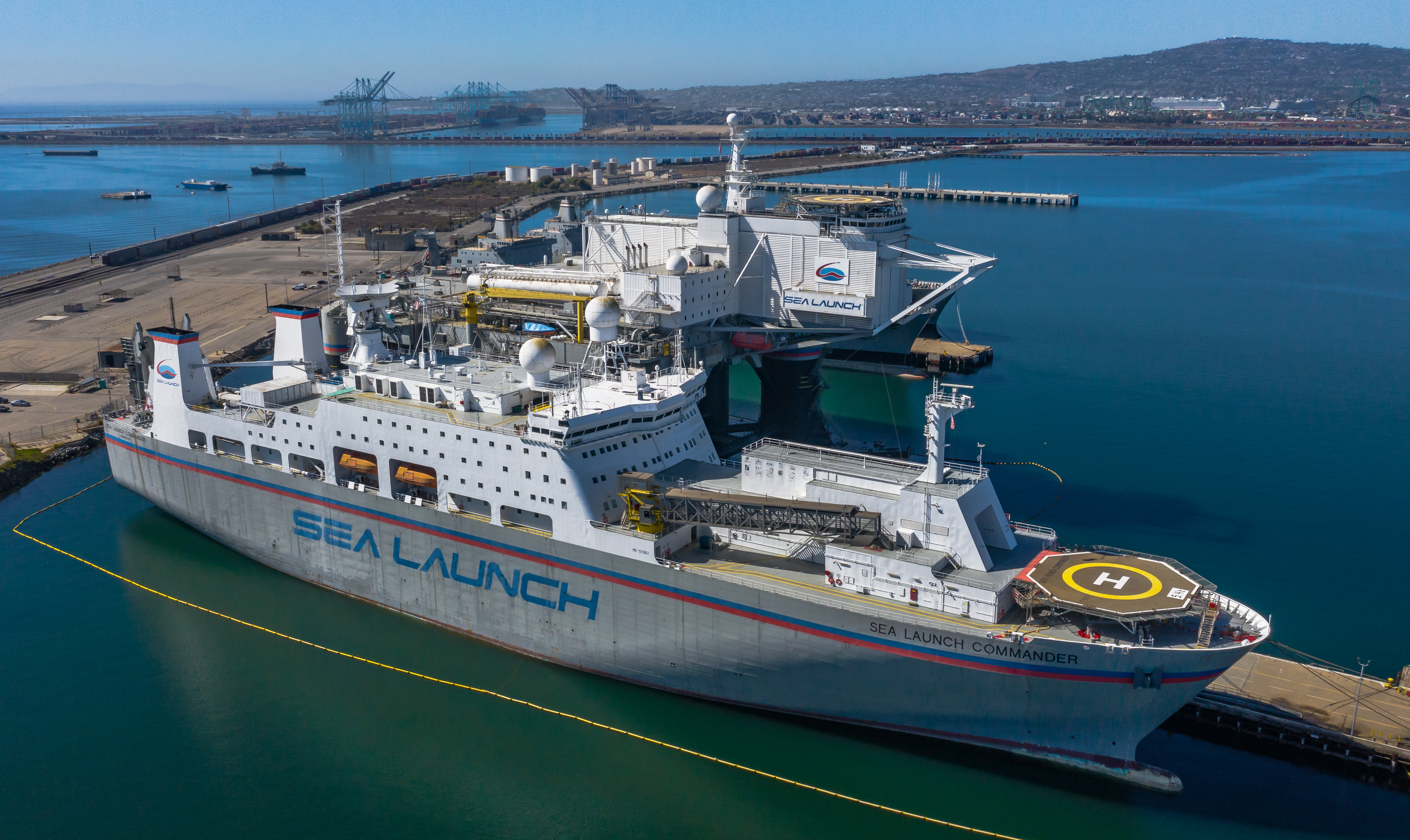
- Sea Launch Commander and Odyssey moored in Los Angeles in 2019

History
- Owner: Sea Launch
- Port of registry: Liberia
- Builder: Kvaerner Govan Ltd
- Launched: 1997
- Identification: IMO number: 9133812

General characteristics
- Type: Assembly and Command Ship
- Tonnage: 50,023 GT, 10,430 DWT
- Displacement: 30,000 t (30,000 long tons; 33,000 short tons)
- Length: 203 m (666 ft)
- Beam: 32 m (105 ft)
- Draft: 8 m (26 ft)
- Installed power: 21200 bhp
- Propulsion: 4x Wartsila 46 diesel 15.8 MW 21200bhp Twin screws
- Speed: 11 knots (20 km/h; 13 mph), 19.5 knots (36.1 km/h; 22.4 mph) max
- Range: 33,000 km (21,000 mi)

Sea Launch Commander is a command ship for Sea Launch.

As of 2013, she was registered in Liberia. Her home port was at Long Beach, California.

== History ==
Sea Launch Commander was commissioned by Sea Launch, after Sea Launch was established in 1995 as a consortium of four companies from Norway, Russia, Ukraine and the United States, managed by Boeing with participation from the other shareholders. She was built by Kvaerner Govan Ltd at Govan shipyard in Glasgow, Scotland, and launched in 1997.

In the fall of 1997, the ship sailed for Russia, where special equipment for handling rocket components and for commanding and controlling launches was installed and tested. She arrived in Long Beach, California, on July 13, 1998, after a voyage through the Panama Canal.

The first rocket launch controlled by Sea Launch Commander was in March 1999. The ship originally carried colors representing the majority ownership of Sea Launch by a Ukrainian company.

Following a 2009 bankruptcy of the company, Energia—which already owned 25% of Sea Launch—acquired a controlling interest of 85% in the Sea Launch company and therefore in Sea Launch Commander. As a result, the company planned to begin land-based launches from the Baikonur Cosmodrome in early 2011, while sea-based launches were to resume in September 2011. The ship currently carries colors representing the majority ownership of Sea Launch by a Russian company. Some time after 2018, she has been moved to a port on the east coast of Russia.

While docked in Long Beach in 2013, Sea Launch Commander served as a filming location for the Marvel film Captain America: The Winter Soldier, portraying the fictional S.H.I.E.L.D. vessel Lemurian Star.

== Technical description ==
The Assembly and Command Ship—or ACS, and subsequently named Sea Launch Commander—was an all-new, purpose-built vessel that serves as a floating rocket assembly factory while in port, provides crew and customer accommodations and also houses mission control facilities for launches at sea.

The ACS is approximately 200 metres (660 ft) long, 32 metres (105 ft) wide, displaces more than 30,000 tonnes (30,000 long tons; 33,000 short tons) and has a cruising range of 33,000 kilometres (21,000 mi). The ACS provides accommodations for up to 240 crew members, customers and VIPs—including medical facilities, a dining room, recreation and entertainment facilities.
