= T10 (satellite) =

Telecommunications satellite

- Operator: DirecTV
- COSPAR ID: 2007-032A
- SATCAT no.: 31862
- Mission duration: Elapsed: 18 years, 7 months, 20 days

Spacecraft properties
- Bus: BSS-702
- Manufacturer: Boeing

Start of mission
- Launch date: July 6, 2007
- Rocket: Proton-M/Briz-M
- Launch site: Baikonur 200/39
- Contractor: ILS

Orbital parameters
- Reference system: Geocentric
- Regime: Geostationary
- Longitude: 103.0° West

Transponders
- Capacity: 500 MHz

T10 (formerly DirecTV-10) is a Boeing model 702 direct broadcast satellite that provides high-definition television (HDTV) to DirecTV subscribers in North America. It was launched by International Launch Services on July 7, 2007 from the Baikonur Cosmodrome in Kazakhstan aboard an Enhanced Proton Breeze-M rocket. After about two months of in-orbit testing, the satellite was moved to its operating position at 103.0° west longitude. This was the third DirecTV satellite launched on a Proton rocket. Prior launches include T8, which was launched on May 22, 2005, and T5, which was launched on May 7, 2002. The satellite was renamed to T10 in 2017.

DirecTV contracted with Boeing in 2004 to build three identical 702 model satellites — DirecTV-10, 11 and 12. DirecTV-11 was launched on March 19, 2008 and DirecTV-12 was launched on December 29, 2009. The satellites were purchased to significantly increase the number of national and local HDTV channels DirecTV offers. All satellites have since been renamed to the T-prefix.

== Technology ==
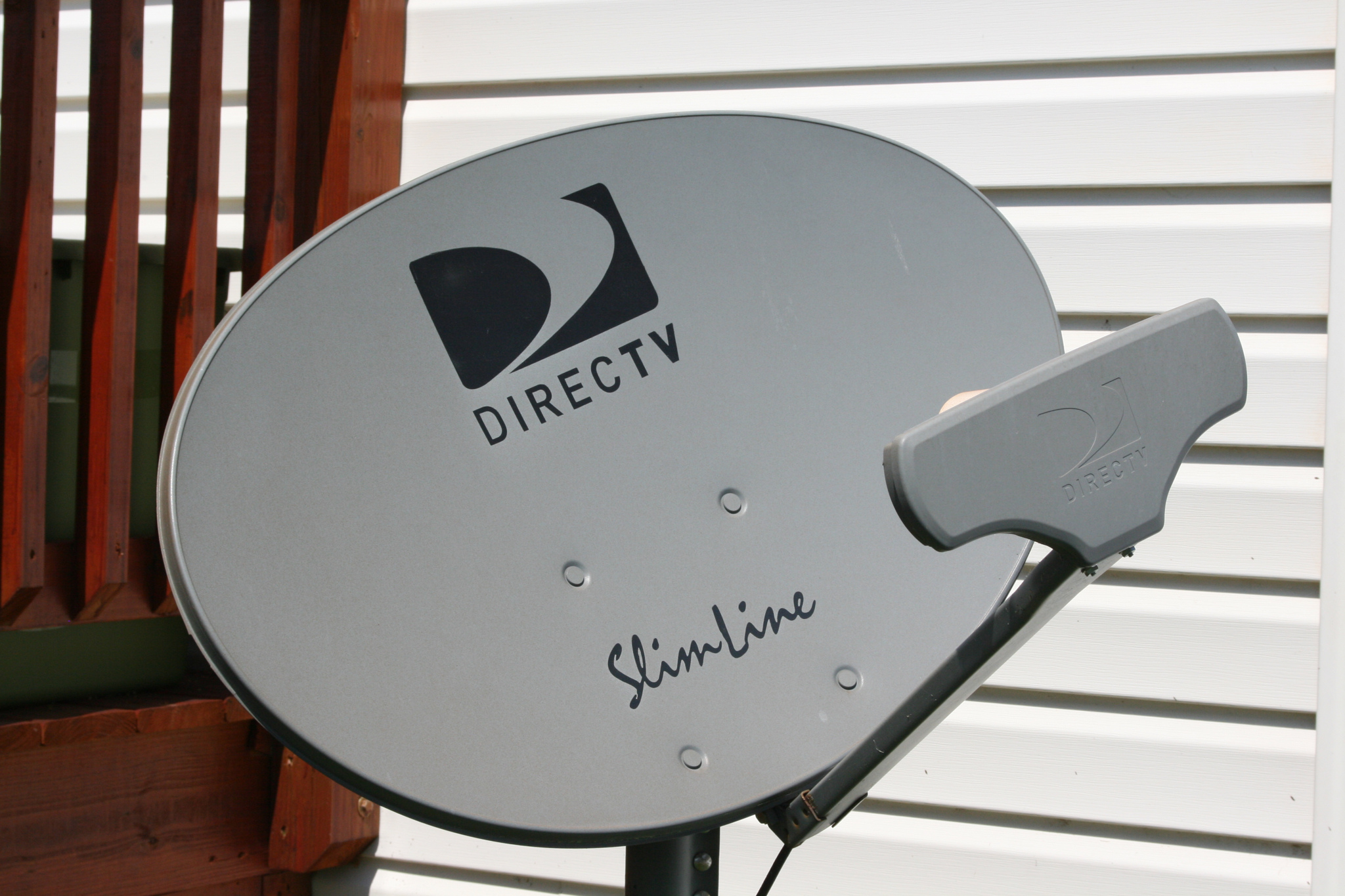
DirecTV AU9-S 5-LNB "Slimline" satellite dish

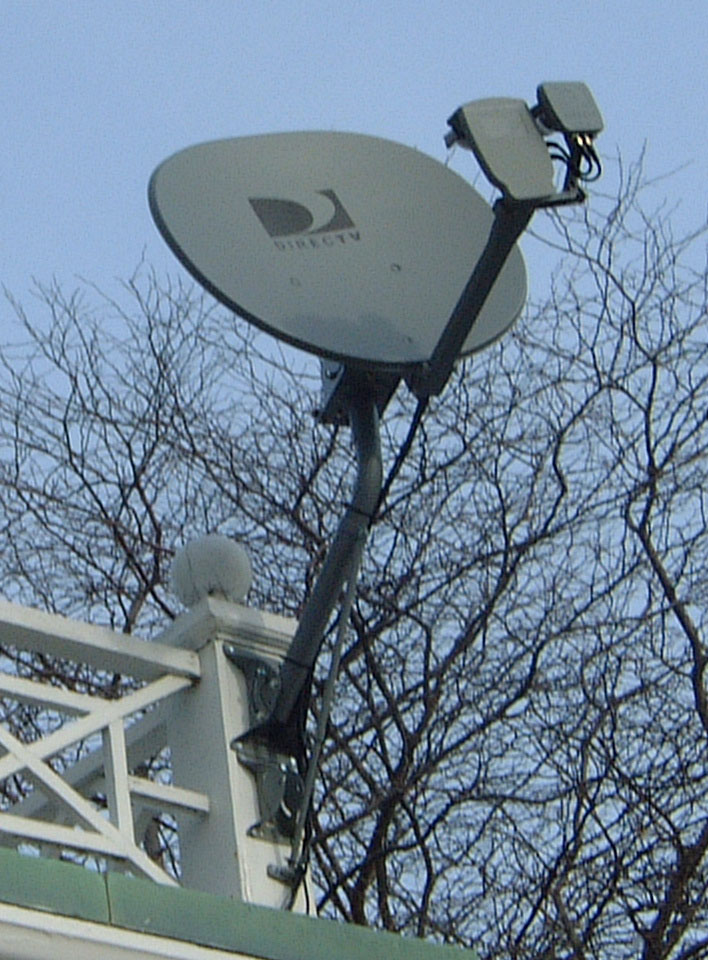
DirecTV AT-9 5-LNB "Sidecar" satellite dish

T10 transmits MPEG-4 encoded signals, a compression standard which is more efficient than MPEG-2 which DirecTV uses for standard definition and a small number of HD channels. The use of MPEG-4 compression allows the satellite to carry significantly more channels than it could using MPEG-2 compression. Receiving signals from DirecTV-10 requires an advanced receiver capable of decoding MPEG-4 signals, such as the H21 or HR21, and a 5-LNB K_{u}/K_{a} dish, such as the AT-9 "Sidecar". These receivers also receive MPEG-2 channels and offer interactive services.

T10 was co-located with the SPACEWAY-1 satellite until the latter was decommissioned in 2020. The SPACEWAY satellites were originally designed so that 500 MHz of spectrum would be used for simple one-way broadcasting and 500 MHz for a broadband 2-way internet service. At the request of DirecTV, Boeing disabled the on-board processing payload designed to deliver enhanced connectivity for the 2-way internet service. T10 and T11 use this 500 MHz of spectrum for yet more simple one-way broadcast HDTV.

== B-Band converter ==
B-Band Converters Connected to DirecTV HR20-700 Receiver

Since the 500 MHz frequency block (18.3-18.8 GHz) used by T10 and T11 on downlink were not intended for DBS broadcasting, existing equipment cannot receive them without a B-Band Converter (BBC). DirecTV supplies BBCs with all 5-LNB K_{u}/K_{a}-band dish systems.

The satellite signal from T10 is downconverted at the dish to the frequency range of 250-750 MHz, called "K_{a}-lo". At the receiver when necessary, the BBC in response to a control signal from the receiver blocks any original "K_{a}-hi" signals between 1650-2150 MHz. Then up-converts the 250-750 MHz signals to this range which is expected by current receivers. Because this frequency range conflicts with terrestrial broadcast frequencies, any off-the-air (OTA) diplexors must be placed at some point after the BBC.

== Specifications ==
T10 uses 32 active and 12 spare K_{a}-band Traveling wave tube amplifiers (TWTA) to broadcast national programming and 55 active and 15 spare spot beam TWTAs for local television services. The satellite uses bent pipe communications. It is powered by a solar array spanning 48.1 meters that consists of ultra triple junction gallium arsenide solar cells.

== Technical problems ==
DirecTV reported in a press release on September 14, 2007 that in-orbit testing had uncovered problems with the satellite's spot beam transponders used to broadcast local HDTV channels:

While testing of DIRECTV 10's capability continues, it appears that a portion of the anticipated spot-beam capability may not be fully available. The investigation to determine the cause of the reduced capability and potential means to mitigate its effect is on-going. However, we currently believe our planned expansion of HD local programming as previously announced will not be materially affected.

=== Amelioration ===
According to a May 7, 2010 FCC filing:

"DirecTV 10 is currently operating at the 102.815° orbital location. As DirecTV has previously informed the Commission, that satellite suffered a post launch anomaly that has limited the capacity available in certain local markets. DirecTV believes that it can ameliorate this condition, but will need to discontinue commercial service from the satellite and relocate it slightly so that it is not within the cluster of its other operational satellites. Accordingly, DirecTV intends to move DirecTV 10 to the 102.6° position to conduct the restorative procedure. During this migration, DirecTV 10 will continue to provide service to subscribers. However, over the course of this migration, DirecTV intends to transfer all traffic from DirecTV 10 to DirecTV-12, DirecTV's newest satellite which has just completed in-orbit testing and is expected to arrive at the nominal 103° location on or about May 11, 2010. At the conclusion of the STA period, the satellite will be in a position for the corrective procedure to be attempted."

The fixes were completed in mid June and T10 (then known as DirecTV-10) completed its drift back to its assigned location on June 24, 2010.
