= DemoSat =

Satellite mock-up

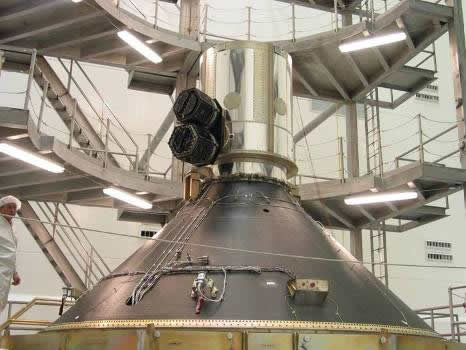
Demosat-Payload on the first Delta IV-Heavy rocket

A DemoSat is a boilerplate spacecraft used to test a carrier rocket without risking a real satellite on the launch. They are most commonly flown on the maiden flights of rockets, but have also been flown on return-to-flight missions after launch failures. Defunct satellites from cancelled programmes may be flown as DemoSats, for example the maiden flight of the Soyuz-2 rocket placed an obsolete Zenit-8 satellite onto a sub-orbital trajectory in order to test the rocket's performance.

== See also ==
- Boilerplate (spaceflight)
