= Odyssey (launch platform) =

Self-propelled semi-submersible mobile spacecraft launch platform

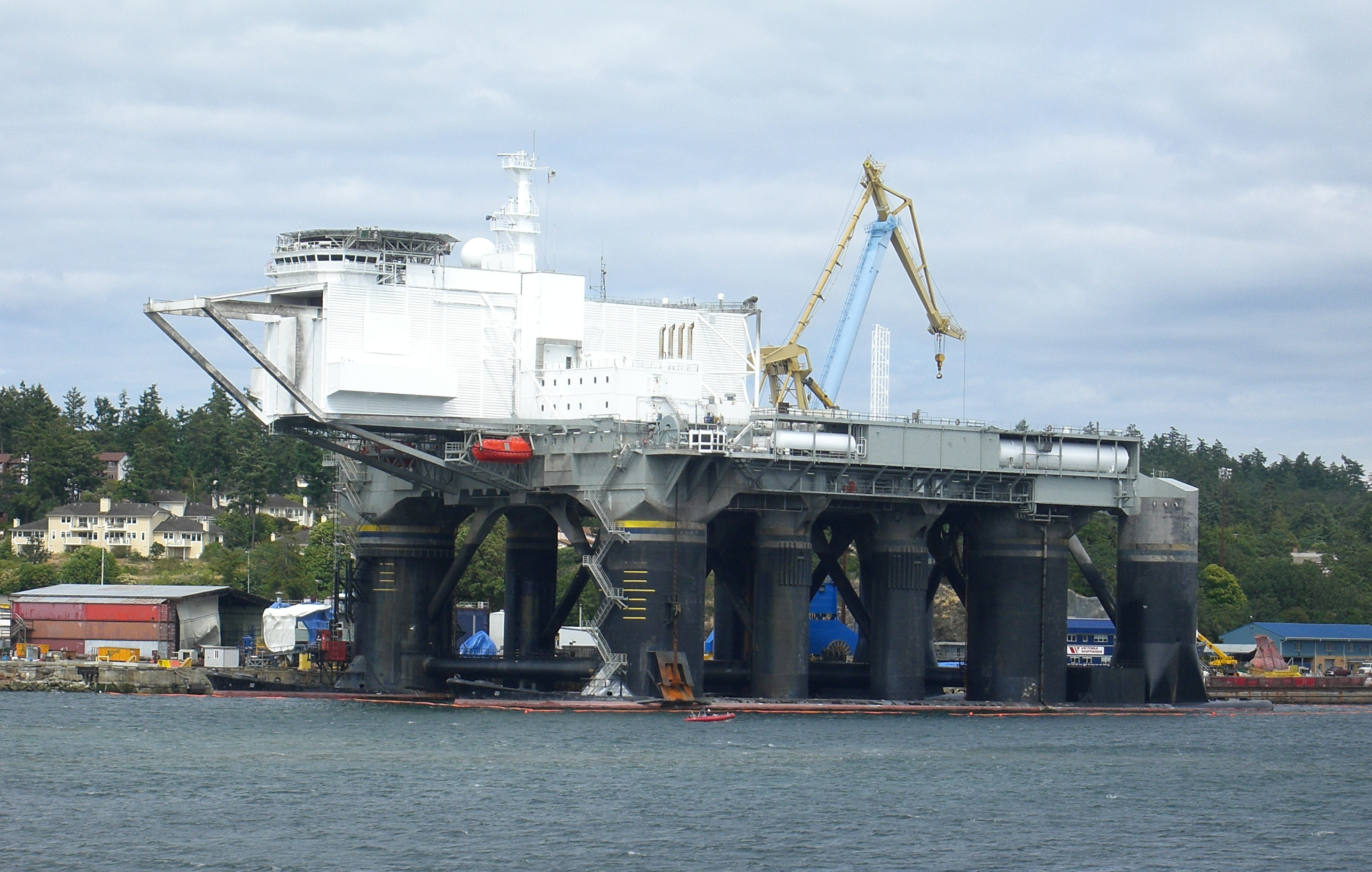
- Odyssey at a graving dock in Esquimalt, British Columbia

History
- Name: Odyssey
- Owner: S7 Group
- Operator: Sea Launch
- Port of registry: Monrovia, Liberia
- Builder: Sumitomo Heavy Industries, Oppama Shipyard, Yokosuka, Kanagawa, Japan
- Completed: March 1983
- Identification: IMO number: 8753196; MMSI number: 636010468; Callsign: ELTA7

General characteristics
- Class & type: Semi-submersible mobile spacecraft launch platform
- Tonnage: 36,436 GT
- Displacement: Empty: 30,000 t (29,500 long tons); Submerged: 50,600 t (49,800 long tons)
- Length: 132.9 m (436 ft)
- Beam: 67 m (220 ft)
- Draught: 34.5 m (113 ft)
- Installed power: 8 × Bergen KVG/B-12 engines (~1,550 hp or 1,160 kW each)
- Crew: 68 crew and launch system personnel

LP Odyssey is a self-propelled semi-submersible mobile spacecraft launch platform converted from a mobile drilling rig in 1997.

The vessel was used by Sea Launch for equatorial Pacific Ocean launches. She works in concert with the assembly and control ship Sea Launch Commander. Her home port was at the Port of Long Beach in the United States.

In her current form, Odyssey is 436 feet (133 m) long and about 220 feet (67 m) wide, with an empty draft displacement of 30,000 tonnes (29,500 long tons), and a submerged draft displacement of 50,600 tonnes (49,800 long tons). The vessel has accommodations for 68 crew and launch system personnel, including living, dining, medical and recreation facilities. A large environmentally-controlled hangar stores the rocket during transit, from which the rocket is rolled out and erected prior to fueling and launch.

In September 2016 the platform along with other Sea Launch assets was sold to S7 Group, the parent company of S7 Airlines. Since then she has been moved to a port on the east coast of Russia, along with the other ship.

== History ==
Ocean Odyssey in her original drilling rig configuration

The platform was completed in 1983 for Ocean Drilling & Exploration Company (ODECO) by Sumitomo Heavy Industries. It drilled its first exploratory hole about 40 miles (64 km) south of Yakutat for ARCO Alaska, Inc. The rig cost about US$110 million to build during the early eighties oil "boom".

During construction the vessel was called Ocean Ranger II, and was renamed Ocean Odyssey after Ocean Ranger capsized with all hands lost during a storm off Newfoundland on 15 February 1982.

When built, Ocean Odyssey was classed +A1 +AMS by the American Bureau of Shipping for unrestricted worldwide ocean service. She was a 390-foot (120 m) long, 226-foot (69 m) wide, twin-hull design with a 12,450 hp (9,280 kW) propulsion system. The rig's structure was designed to simultaneously withstand 100-knot (190 km/h) winds, 110-foot (34 m) waves, and a 3-knot (5.6 km/h) current. The derrick was fully enclosed with a heated drill floor permitting operations down to −35 °C (−31 °F).

The rig had other advanced extreme-condition features as well. For example, the rig's columns were strengthened to withstand some ice impact and the marine riser had a feature similar to a cow-catcher to keep floating ice off the marine riser that connected the rig to the well on the ocean bottom.

=== 1988 North Sea gas blowout ===
On 22 September 1988, Ocean Odyssey suffered a blowout while operated by ODECO (now Diamond Offshore Drilling) on hire to ARCO (now a subsidiary of BP), drilling the 22/30b-3 well on a prospect in the North Sea. The ultimate direct cause of the incident was a failure of the subsea wellhead equipment after a prolonged period of well control. During the resulting fire the radio operator, Timothy Williams, was killed. He had been ordered from the lifeboats and back to the radio room by the rig's manager, who failed to countermand the order when the rig was evacuated.

Survivors were picked up by the rig's emergency standby vessel Notts Forest (38 rescued) and the nearby anchor handling tug British Fulmar (28 rescued). Four Sea King helicopters from HMS Illustrious and a Sea King from RAF Boulmer assisted rescue operations and transferred survivors from Notts Forest and British Fulmar to the drilling rig Sedneth 701. A Royal Air Force Hawker Siddeley Nimrod provided coordination on scene.

The incident was featured in the 1990 STV television series Rescue episode "Missing".

=== Launch platform conversion ===
Ocean Odyssey spent the next several years as a rusting hulk in the docks of Dundee, Scotland. Her availability prompted Boeing to establish the Sea Launch consortium, for which she was bought in 1993 by Kværner Rosenberg of Stavanger, Norway, and renamed LP Odyssey.

From late 1995 to May 1997, Kværner extended the length of the platform and added a pair of support columns and additional propulsion systems. The upper deck — the location of the former drill floor — was rebuilt to accommodate the launch pad and launch vehicle service hangar. In May 1997, Ocean Odyssey arrived at Kværner Vyborg Shipyard for the installation of the launch vehicle equipment itself.

By 1999, the vessel was ready for service, and on 27 March 1999, a Zenit-3SL rocket successfully launched a demonstration satellite to a geostationary transfer orbit. The first commercial launch occurred on 9 October 1999, with the orbiting of the DirecTV 1-R satellite.

=== 2007 launch failure ===
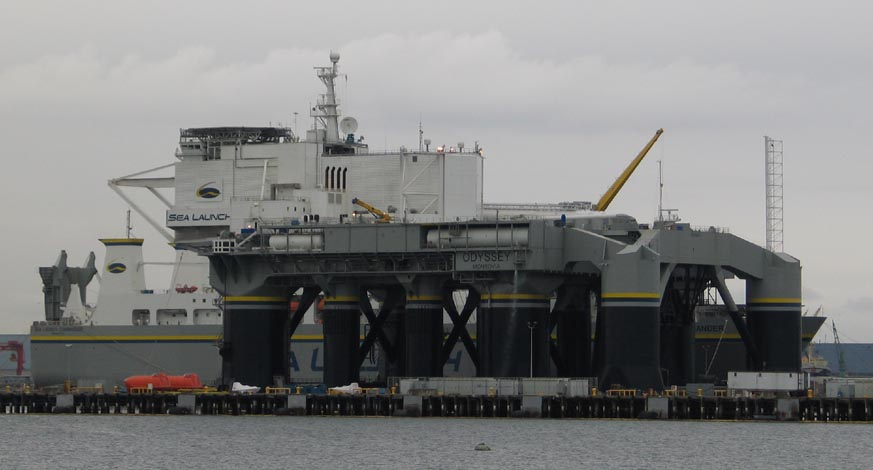
Odyssey at port, with Sea Launch Commander behind

On 30 January 2007, a Zenit-3SL carrying the NSS-8 satellite exploded aboard Odyssey at liftoff due to a turbopump malfunction. There were no injuries, as the ship had been evacuated for launch operations. Damage to the launch platform was mostly superficial, though a 600,000 lb (270,000 kg) flame deflector was knocked loose from underneath the platform and lost, along with damage to the hangar doors and antennae. The vessel was repaired at a shipyard in Vancouver, British Columbia.

Odyssey returned to service on 15 January 2008, with the successful launch of the Thuraya 3 satellite.

=== 2013 launch failure ===
On 1 February 2013, the Zenit-3SL rocket carrying Intelsat 27 suffered a failure after its launch from Odyssey, crashing a short distance from the launch platform. Its first stage engine appeared to shut down around 25 seconds after launch and telemetry from the rocket was lost about 15 seconds later. Telemetry indicated that excessive roll was detected 11 seconds after launch. The guidance system was programmed to shut down the engine, but only after the rocket was safely away from the launch platform. It is believed that a failure in a hydraulic pump that provides power for gimbaling the RD-171 engine was ultimately the cause. The launch platform suffered no damage.

== See also ==
- List of Zenit launches
- Notable offshore well blowouts
