= Hughes Network Systems =

High-speed satellite internet service provider

Hughes Network Systems, LLC
- Type: Subsidiary
- Industry: Telecommunications Satellite Internet
- Founded: 1971; 55 years ago (Digital Communications Corp)
- Headquarters: Germantown, Maryland, U.S.
- Area served: Worldwide
- Key people: Hamid Akhavan (CEO, EchoStar); Paul Gaske (COO, Hughes Network Systems and EchoStar)
- Services: Satellite networks and services
- Revenue: $1.97 billion (2022)
- Number of employees: 2,000 (2022)
- Parent: EchoStar
- ASNs: 6621, 63062
- Website: www.Hughes.com

Hughes Network Systems, LLC is an American telecommunications company that provides satellite-based communication services for consumer and enterprise markets. It is headquartered in Germantown, Maryland and provides satellite internet services under the brand HughesNet. HughesNet has 622,000 subscribers as of August 2026, down from over a million in 2023, and 1.4 million in 2022. Hughes Network Systems is a wholly owned subsidiary of EchoStar, which acquired its former parent company, Hughes Communications, in 2011.

In August 2026, Hughes Network Systems filed for Chapter 11 bankruptcy, citing sustained loss of subscribers to SpaceX Starlink and other low earth orbit satellite competitors. Hughes laid off 400 employees, approximately one-third of their workforce, and is asking the court to restructure the company to address the significant shortfall in cash for operations.

== History ==
Hughes Communications was founded in 1971 under the name Digital Communication Corporation (DCC) by a group of seven engineers and a lawyer led by John Puente and Dr. Burton Edelson, who all previously worked together at Comsat Laboratories. With $40,000 in startup capital, the company operated from a garage in Rockville, Maryland, designing circuit boards for telecom related products.

By 1977, Digital Communications Corp. had 250 employees and $10.6 million in revenue. In 1978, Digital Communications Corp. was acquired by Microwave Associates for an undisclosed sum, (Note: Another sources says it was $8 million.) becoming MA/COM-DCC and began developing satellite related products. The company invented the very small aperture terminal (VSAT) in 1985. That year, the company sold its first VSAT network to Wal-Mart, which used the “technology to connect retail stores in rural areas.” According to SatMagazine, “the global VSAT market is estimated to reach $10 billion by 2021.” In 1987, MA/COM-DCC was acquired by Hughes Aircraft Corporation for $105 million and renamed Hughes Communications.

In 2004, News Corp acquired a controlling interest in Hughes through a $6.5 billion purchase intended primarily for its DirecTV unit. DirecTV also began selling off its ownership interests, culminating in a $100 million sale to a private equity firm in 2005. As a result, Hughes became a wholly owned subsidiary of SkyTerra Communications Inc., which was controlled by the investment firm.

Hughes Communications was spun-off as an independent public company in 2007 and began trading on NASDAQ under the ticker symbol HUGH.

On February 14, 2011, Englewood, Colorado-based EchoStar announced it will acquire Hughes Communications, and its subsidiaries including its main operating subsidiary, Hughes Network Systems, for about $2 billion. (Note: Another source says $1.3 billion.) The acquisition was completed on June 8, 2011, resulting in the dissolution of Hughes Communications into EchoStar and retaining Hughes Network Systems as a wholly owned subsidiary of EchoStar.

In May 2024, Hughes Network Systems and Dish Network (which was acquired by EchoStar in 2023) announced a bundle of Dish satellite TV with Hughesnet satellite internet.

On June 6, 2025, it was reported that EchoStar Corporation was considering filing for Chapter 11 bankruptcy protection amid an ongoing Federal Communications Commission (FCC) investigation into its compliance with federal 5G obligations. The FCC’s actions had severely limited EchoStar’s ability to make strategic decisions regarding the growth and investment of its Boost Mobile business. EchoStar had also missed over $500 million in interest payments, while DirecTV had terminated its agreement to acquire EchoStar’s satellite television business over a failed debt-exchange offer.

EchoStar warned in July 2026 that Hughes Network Systems was preparing to file for bankruptcy within days to address long-term debt. Hughes Satellite Systems Corporation and certain U.S. subsidiaries, including Hughes Network Systems, LLC, subsequently filed for Chapter 11 bankruptcy protection on August 2, 2026, amid approximately $1.5 billion in maturing debt obligations. The filing followed a decline of 59,000 HughesNet broadband subscribers during the second quarter of 2026, leaving the service with approximately 622,000 subscribers. As part of the resulting restructuring, Hughes planned to lay off approximately 400 of its 1,275 employees while continuing to serve its satellite customers.

In August 2026, during Hughes’s Chapter 11 proceedings, a U.S. bankruptcy judge announced plans to appoint an examiner to investigate transactions involving Hughes Network Systems and its parent company, EchoStar.

== Technology and services ==
=== Satellite systems ===
In 2012, Hughes launched the Jupiter (stylized as JUPITER) System, Hughes' VSAT ground system that provides high-performance terminals, increased gateway architecture, and advanced air interface for both high-throughput and conventional satellites. The Jupiter System supports applications such as broadband Internet and Intranet access, community Wi-Fi hotspots, cellular backhaul, digital signage and mobility, including airborne services.

Through its Jupiter Aero System, an integrated system of airborne and ground equipment and software, Hughes provides broadband access to aircraft. As of 2018, about 1,000 aircraft carried Hughes technology on board.

In March 2018, Hughes announced improvements to the Jupiter system, doubling the throughput of HT2xxx terminals to more than 200 Mbit/s and increasing capacity.

Hughes HX and HT satellite broadband platforms are used for broadband IP services, high speed internet, VoIP, and video by telecom providers around the world and the military.

Hughes has deployed more than 9 million VSAT terminals of all types in more than 100 countries, representing more than 50 percent market share.

=== Satellite services ===
Hughes satellite backhaul of cellular service extended 4G/LTE service to remote and rural areas around the world, specifically where conventional backhaul was difficult or costly due to geography and terrain.

Hughes cellular backhaul applications included a 4G/LTE optimization capability that yielded up to 60 percent bandwidth savings.

=== HughesNet ===
Hughes Network Systems operated a satellite-based high-speed broadband internet service under the brand HughesNet from 1996 to 2026. HughesNet was originally launched in 1996 as a satellite Internet service for consumers and small businesses under the name DirecPC (using the same branding format as the satellite broadcast service DirecTV, which was under common ownership at the time) and was renamed Direcway in May 2002. On March 27, 2006, two years after DirecTV split off from Hughes in 2005, it was renamed HughesNet. In 2012, Hughes introduced its first offering of broadband satellite Internet.

In 2016, Hughes expanded HughesNet into Brazil, marking its first international expansion of the service. It expanded into Colombia in September 2017, into Peru in October 2018, into Ecuador in December 2018, and into Mexico and Chile in 2019.

The long distance to the geosynchronous orbit used by HughesNet increases latency to over 600 ms, over 10 times more than terrestrial or low Earth orbit systems like Starlink, rendering it much less competitive for applications like videoconferencing and video gaming.

=== Digital cellular ===
Hughes Network Systems was first to commercially deploy dual mode (2G) cellular phone technology in North America. HNS also created the first prototypes for the technology behind GM's OnStar service and pioneered the Radio Frequency Channel Simulator technology commercialized by Hewlett Packard.

=== Managed network services ===
Hughes offered managed network services for distributed enterprise businesses and government organizations. Its HughesON managed services include SD-WAN, Wi-Fi and location analytics and cloud-based digital signage and employee training.

== See also ==
- Hughes Europe
