= Zenit-3SL =

Expendable carrier rocket

- Zenit-3SL
- Function: Carrier rocket
- Manufacturer: Yuzhmash (Zenit); RKK Energia (Block-DM); Boeing (fairing)
- Country of origin: Ukraine

Size
- Height: 59.6 metres (196 ft)
- Diameter: 3.9 metres (13 ft)
- Mass: 462,200 kilograms (1,019,000 lb)
- Stages: Three

Capacity

Payload to GTO
- Mass: 6,160 kilograms (13,580 lb)

Associated rockets
- Family: Zenit
- Derivative work: Zenit-3SLB

Launch history
- Status: Retired
- Launch sites: Ocean Odyssey
- Total launches: 36
- Success(es): 32
- Failure: 3
- Partial failure: 1
- First flight: 28 March 1999 (test flight)
- Last flight: 26 May 2014 (Eutelsat 3B)

First stage
- Powered by: 1 RD-171
- Maximum thrust: 8,180 kilonewtons (1,840,000 lb_{f})
- Specific impulse: 337 sec
- Burn time: 150 seconds
- Propellant: RP-1/LOX

Second stage
- Powered by: 1 RD-120; 1 RD-8
- Maximum thrust: 912 kilonewtons (205,000 lb_{f}); 79.5 kilonewtons (17,900 lb_{f})
- Specific impulse: 349 sec
- Burn time: 315 seconds
- Propellant: RP-1/LOX

Third stage – Block DM-SL
- Powered by: 1 RD-58M
- Maximum thrust: 84.9 kilonewtons (19,100 lb_{f})
- Specific impulse: 352 sec
- Burn time: 650 seconds
- Propellant: RP-1/LOX

The Zenit-3SL was an expendable carrier rocket operated by Sea Launch. First flown in 1999, it was launched 36 times, with three failures and one partial failure. It was a member of the Zenit family of rockets, and is built by the Yuzhnoye Design Bureau. RKK Energia produced the Block DM-SL upper stage, whilst the payload fairing was produced by Boeing. Launches were conducted from the Ocean Odyssey platform anchored on the equator in the Pacific Ocean, at a point with 154°W longitude, about 370 kilometres east of Kiritimati.

== History ==
The Zenit-3SL design began in the late 1980s as the Zenit-3, a proposed replacement for the Proton-K, which would have used a Zenit-2 rocket with a Block D upper stage. This proposal was shelved after the dissolution of the Soviet Union, as Russia inherited the space programme, however the Zenit was manufactured in Ukrainian SSR. Boeing became involved in the programme in 1994. The design was subsequently modified, with a modified version of the Block DM replacing the Block D.

Sea Launch integrated the rockets in California, and transferred them to Odyssey via the Sea Launch Commander for transportation to the launch site. Once at the launch site, the rocket was erected on the platform, and a three-day countdown was initiated. The countdown was fully automated, and personnel were evacuated from the launch platform to Commander prior to launch.

Zenit-3SL launches predominantly carried communications satellites into geosynchronous transfer orbits. As of 2009, the only payload to be launched by a Zenit-3SL that was not a communications satellite was a DemoSat, on the maiden flight. The only launch to be conducted to an orbit other than GTO was that of ICO F-1, which was intended to be placed into medium Earth orbit, however the rocket failed to reach orbit.

== Reliability ==
Of thirty-six rockets launched, three failed, with a fourth placing its payload into an incorrect, but recoverable orbit. The first failure occurred during the third flight, on 12 March 2000, when a software error resulted in the premature cutoff of the second stage, leaving the ICO F-1 satellite unable to reach orbit.

On 29 June 2004, during the launch of Apstar 5, the upper stage shut down 54 seconds early due to a wiring fault, leaving the satellite in a lower than planned orbit. The spacecraft raised itself to the correct orbit by means of its onboard manoeuvring engines, at the expense of fuel intended for stationkeeping once in the correct orbit.

On 30 January 2007, a Zenit-3SL exploded on the launch pad after an engine failure caused by debris in the turbopump. The payload on that flight was the NSS-8 communications satellite for SES New Skies. This caused a considerable amount of downtime whilst damage to the launch platform was repaired.

On 1 February 2013, during the launch of Intelsat-27, a Zenit-3SL launch vehicle suffered a premature engine shutdown, as the rocket strayed from its lift-off trajectory, plunging into the Pacific Ocean shortly after launch.

== See also ==
- List of software bugs
