= Chris Clemons (baseball) =

American baseball player (born 1972)

- Pitcher
- Born: October 31, 1972 (age 53); Baytown, Texas, U.S.
- Batted: Right Threw: Right

MLB debut
- July 23, 1997, for the Chicago White Sox

Last MLB appearance
- August 14, 1997, for the Chicago White Sox

MLB statistics
- Win–loss record: 0-2
- Earned run average: 8.53
- Strikeouts: 8
- Stats at Baseball Reference

Teams
- Chicago White Sox (1997)

Christopher Hale Clemons (born October 31, 1972) is an American former Major League Baseball pitcher who played for the Chicago White Sox in 1997.

== Amateur career ==
Born in Baytown, Texas, Clemons attended McGregor High School in McGregor, Texas, and was selected in the 21st round of the 1991 Major League Baseball draft by the Chicago Cubs. He opted to play baseball for the Texas A&M University Aggies, and played on the Aggies' 1993 College World Series team. In 1993, he played collegiate summer baseball in the Cape Cod Baseball League for the Yarmouth-Dennis Red Sox, where he was named the league's outstanding pro prospect. In 1994 he was an All-America and All-Southwest Conference selection, and was drafted by the Chicago White Sox in the 1st round (33rd pick) of the 1994 amateur draft.

== Professional career ==
Clemons played his first professional season with the Rookie league Gulf Coast League White Sox and Class A Hickory Crawdads in 1994. He made his major league debut in 1997 with the White Sox, and appeared in five games for Chicago that year. After the 1997 season, he was selected by the Arizona Diamondbacks in the 1997 Major League Baseball expansion draft, and spent the 1998 and 1999 seasons with the Triple-A Tucson Sidewinders.

== Coaching career ==
In 2008, he was named assistant baseball coach at McLennan Community College in Waco, Texas. In 2009, he was named manager of the Victoria Generals collegiate summer baseball team in the Texas Collegiate League, and received the league's coach of the year honors in 2009 and 2010.
