= SpaceX Raptor =

SpaceX family of liquid-fuel rocket engines

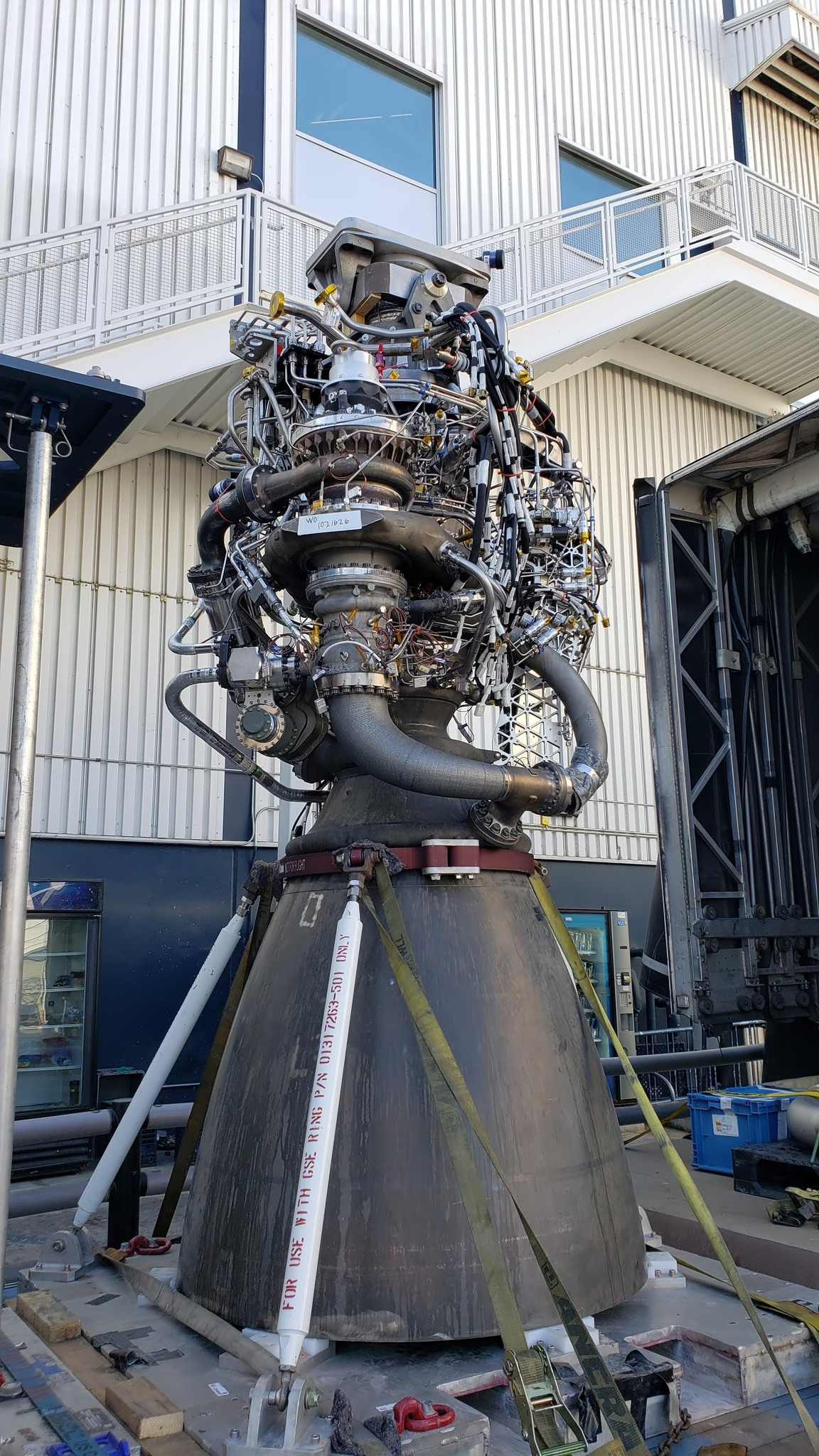
- A Raptor 1 rocket engine ready for transport outside SpaceX's factory in Hawthorne, California
- Country of origin: United States
- Manufacturer: SpaceX
- Associated LV: SpaceX Starship
- Status: In production

Liquid-fuel engine
- Propellant: LOX / CH_{4}
- Mixture ratio: 3.6 (78% O_{2}, 22% CH_{4})
- Cycle: Full-flow staged combustion
- Pumps: 2 turbopumps

Configuration
- Chamber: 1
- Nozzle ratio: 34.34:1 (booster engine)

Performance
- Thrust: Raptor 1: 185 t_{f} (1,814 kN; 407,900 lb_{f}); Raptor 2: 230 t_{f} (2,256 kN; 507,100 lb_{f}) (sea-level); 258 t_{f} (2,530 kN; 568,800 lb_{f}) (vacuum); Raptor 3: 250 t_{f} (2,452 kN; 551,200 lb_{f}) (sea-level); 275 t_{f} (2,697 kN; 606,300 lb_{f}) (vacuum)
- Thrust-to-weight ratio: Raptor 1: 88.94; Raptor 2: 141.1; Raptor 3: 163.9; (Note: Sea-level thrust divided by engine-only mass: 185 t / 2,080 kg, 230 t / 1,630 kg and 250 t / 1,525 kg.)
- Chamber pressure: 3,669.5 psi (253.00 bar) (booster engine, 2019)
- Burn time: Varies

Dimensions
- Length: 3.1 m (10 ft)
- Diameter: 1.3 m (4 ft 3 in)
- Dry mass: Raptor 1: 2,080 kg (4,590 lb); Raptor 2: 1,630 kg (3,590 lb); Raptor 3: 1,525 kg (3,362 lb)

Raptor is a family of rocket engines developed and manufactured by SpaceX. It was the first full-flow staged combustion engine to power a vehicle in flight, on the Starhopper test vehicle in July 2019. The engine is powered by cryogenic liquid methane and liquid oxygen, a combination known as methalox.

SpaceX's super-heavy-lift rocket Starship uses Raptor engines in its Super Heavy booster and in the Starship second stage. Starship missions include lifting payloads to Earth orbit and is also planned for missions to the Moon and Mars. The engines are designed to be reusable.

== Design ==
Raptor is designed for extreme reliability, aiming to support the airline-level safety required by the point-to-point Earth transportation market. Gwynne Shotwell claimed that Raptor would be able to deliver "long life... and more benign turbine environments".

=== Full-flow staged combustion ===
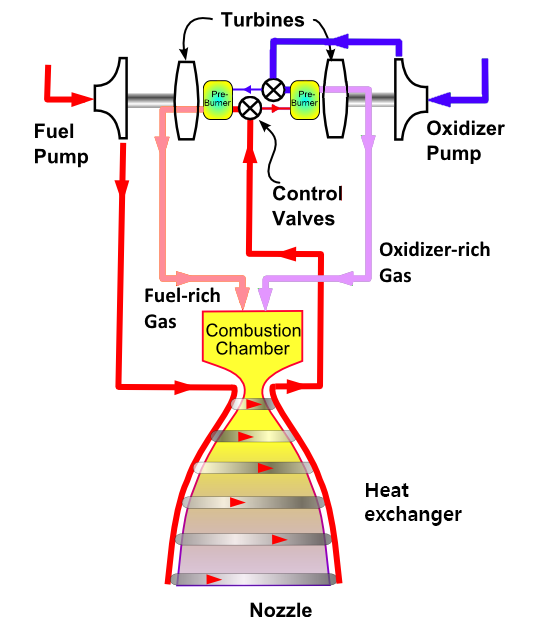
Simplified full-flow staged combustion rocket diagram

Raptor is powered by subcooled liquid methane and subcooled liquid oxygen in a full-flow staged combustion cycle. This type of combustion is a twin-shaft staged combustion cycle that uses both oxidizer-rich and fuel-rich preburners. The cycle allows for the full flow of both propellants through the turbines without dumping any unburnt propellant overboard.

Full-flow staged combustion is a departure from the more traditional "open-cycle" gas generator system and LOX/kerosene propellants used by its predecessor Merlin. Before Raptor, no full-flow staged combustion engine had ever been used inflight and only two designs had progressed sufficiently to reach test stands: the Soviet RD-270 project in the 1960s, a full-scale test engine and the Aerojet Rocketdyne Integrated Powerhead Demonstrator in the mid-2000s, which only demonstrated the powerhead. RS-25 engines (first used on the Space Shuttle) used a simpler form of staged combustion cycle. Several Russian rocket engines, including the RD-180 and the RD-191 did as well.

Full-flow staged combustion has the advantage that the energy produced by the preburners, and used to power the propellant pumps, is spread among the entire fuel flow, meaning that the preburner exhaust driving the propellant turbopumps is as cool as possible, even cooler than other closed engine cycles that only preburn one propellant. This contributes to a long engine life. In contrast, an open-cycle engine in which the preburner exhaust bypasses the main combustion chamber tries to minimize the amount of propellant fed through the preburner, which is achieved by operating the turbine at its maximum survivable temperature.

Raptor 2 rocket engine cycle diagram with estimates from open-source information and analysis

An oxygen-rich turbine powers an oxygen turbopump, and a fuel-rich turbine powers a methane turbopump. Both oxidizer and fuel streams are converted completely to the gas phase before they enter the combustion chamber. Raptor uses a spark ignition system instead of the consumable TEA-TEB hypergolic igniter used by Merlin, which in principle allows many restarts.

=== Propellants ===
Raptor is designed to use subcooled cryogenic methane and oxygen. Chilling the propellants below their boiling points increases their density by about 10 to 12 percent, so more propellant fits in the same tank volume. Subcooling also improves specific impulse and thrust and reduces the risk of cavitation in the turbopumps. The oxidizer to fuel mass ratio of the engine is approximately 3.6 to 1. Methalox burns relatively cleanly, reducing carbon build-up in the engine.

Liquid methane and oxygen propellants have been adopted by other companies, such as Blue Origin with its BE-4 engine, as well as Chinese startup Space Epoch's Longyun-70.

=== Manufacturing and materials ===
The 2016 subscale development engine had 40% (by mass) of its parts manufactured by 3D printing.

== History ==
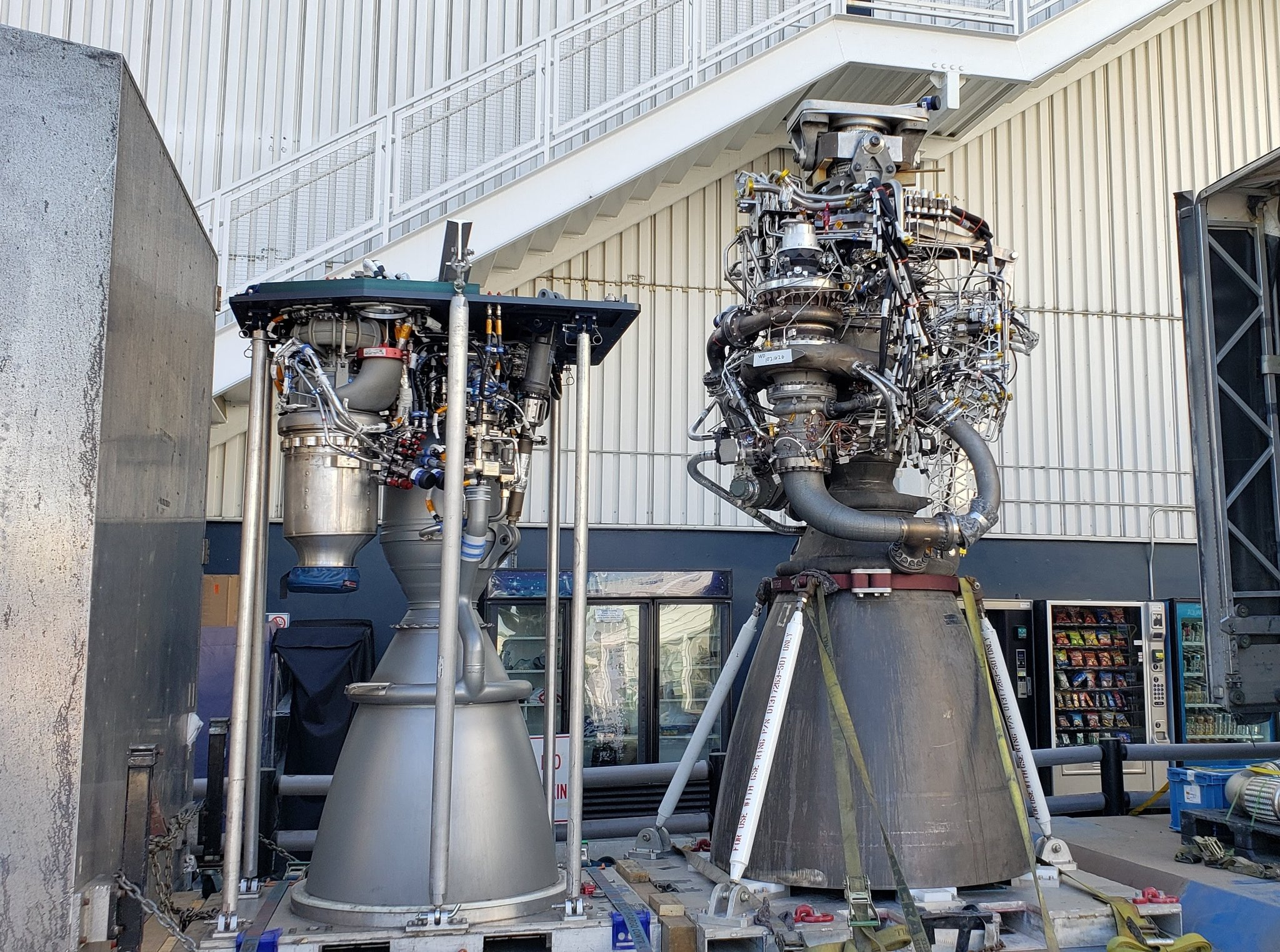
SpaceX's Merlin engine (left) compared to a sea-level Raptor 1 engine (right)

=== Conception ===
SpaceX's Merlin engines use an RP-1 and liquid oxygen ("kerolox") combination. In 2016, Raptor was expected to be up to about three times as powerful as the Merlin engines that power the Falcon 9 and Falcon Heavy launch vehicles.

In October 2012, Musk said SpaceX's planned new rocket, which he called MCT, would be "several times" as powerful as the Merlin 1 series and would not use Merlin's RP-1 fuel.

=== Development ===
In November 2012, SpaceX founder and CEO Elon Musk announced that SpaceX was working on methane-fueled rocket engines, that Raptor would be methane-based, and that methane would fuel Mars colonization. Because of the presence of underground water and carbon dioxide in Mars atmosphere, methane, a simple hydrocarbon, could be synthesized on Mars using the Sabatier reaction. NASA has sought technologies for in-situ resource utilization that would process Martian atmospheric gases into products such as propellants.

In early 2014 SpaceX confirmed that Raptor would be used for both first and second stages of its next rocket. This held as the design evolved from the Mars Colonial Transporter to the Interplanetary Transport System, the Big Falcon Rocket, and ultimately, Starship.

The concept evolved from a family of Raptor-designated rocket engines (2012) to focus on the full-size Raptor engine (2014).

The first version was intended to operate at a chamber pressure of 250 bar (25 MPa; 3,600 psi). In April 2024, Musk shared the performance achieved by SpaceX with the Raptor 1 engine (sea level 185 t_{f}, RVac 200 t_{f}) and Raptor 2 engine (sea level 230 t_{f}, RVac 258 t_{f}) along with the target specifications for the upcoming Raptor 3 (sea level 280 t_{f}, RVac 306 t_{f}) and said SpaceX would aim to ultimately achieve over 330 tonnes of thrust on the sea-level booster engines.

Raptor 1 and 2 engines were fitted with individual protective shrouds, while Raptor 3 integrates its sensors and controllers inside the engine's thermal protection, eliminating the need for individual engine shrouds.

=== Testing ===
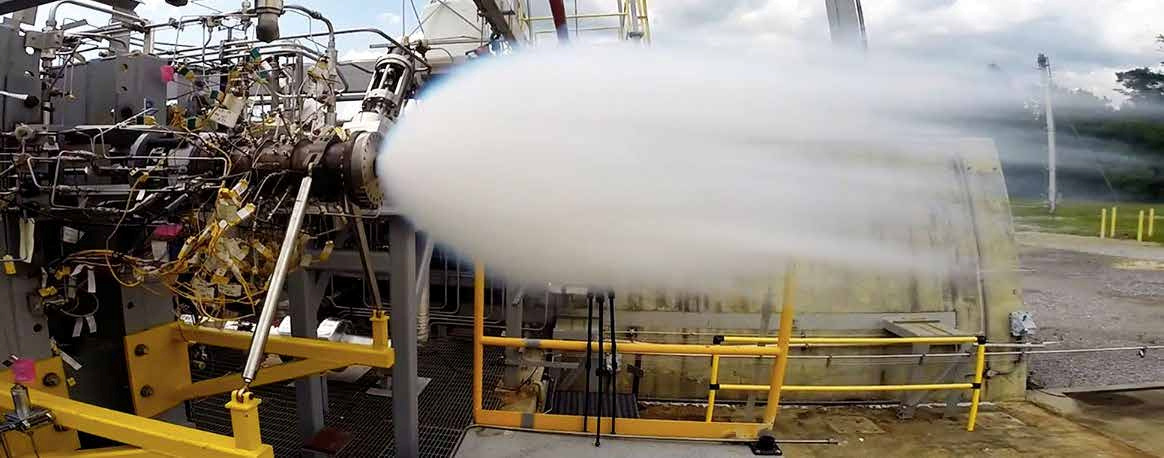
Testing of the Raptor 's oxygen preburner at Stennis Space Center in 2015

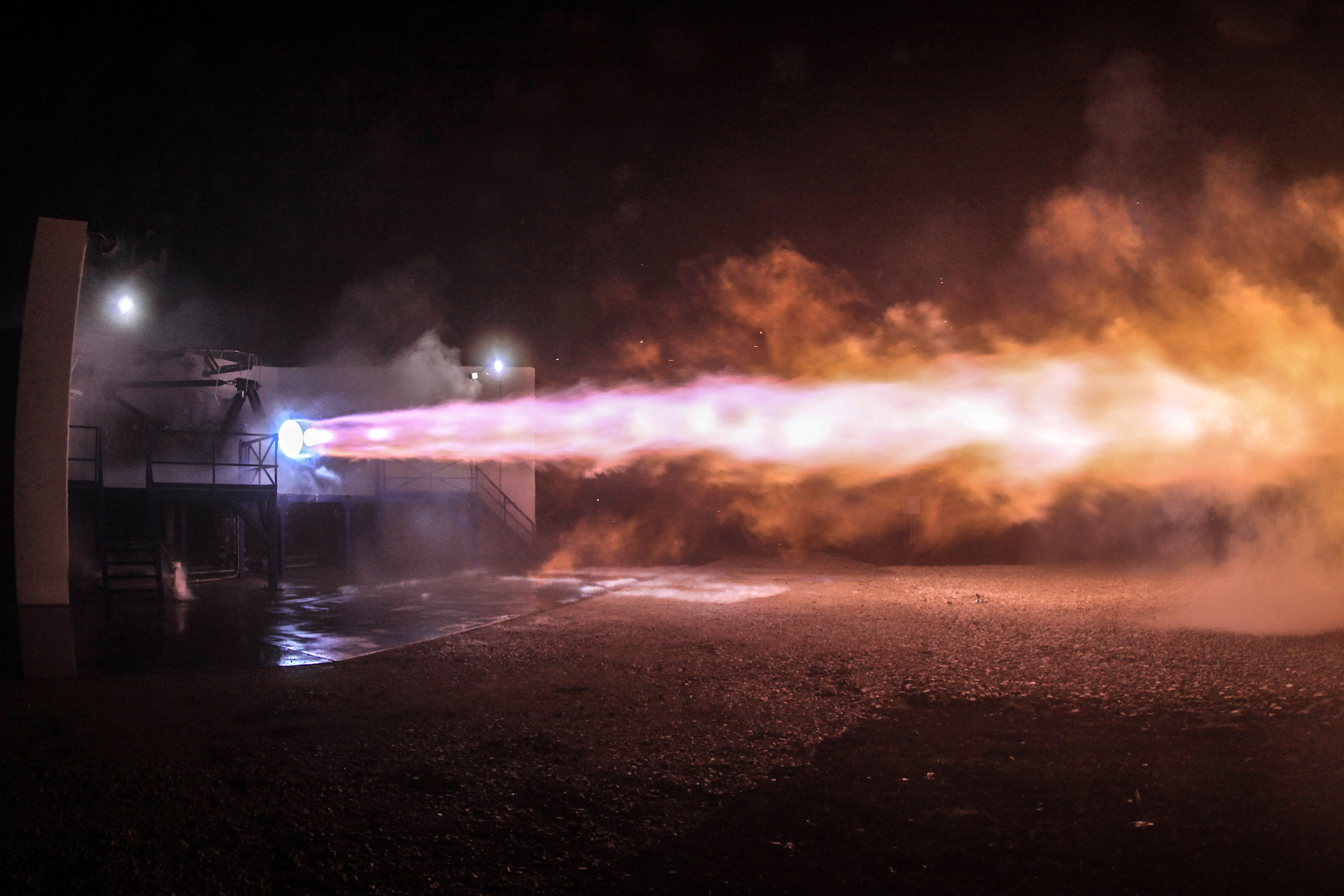
First test firing of a Raptor development engine on 25 September 2016 in McGregor, Texas

Initial development testing of Raptor components was done at NASA's Stennis Space Center, beginning in April 2014. Testing focused on startup and shutdown procedures, as well as hardware characterization and verification.

SpaceX began testing injectors in 2014 and tested an oxygen preburner in 2015. 76 hot-fire tests of the preburner, totaling some 400 seconds of test time, were executed from April–August.

By early 2016, SpaceX had constructed an engine test stand at their McGregor test site in central Texas for Raptor testing. The first Raptor was manufactured at the SpaceX Hawthorne facility in California. By August 2016 it was shipped to McGregor for development testing. It was the first-ever full-flow staged combustion methalox engine to reach a test stand.

A subscale development engine with a thrust of about 1 meganewton (220,000 lb_{f}) was used for design validation. The test engine operated at a chamber pressure of 200 bar (20 MPa; 2,900 psi). Its first firing, on a ground test stand in McGregor in late September 2016, lasted about nine seconds. The development engine's nozzle expansion ratio was limited to 150, the maximum possible within Earth's atmosphere.

By September 2017, the subscale engine had completed 1200 seconds of firings across 42 tests.

SpaceX completed many static fire tests on a vehicle using Raptor 2s, including a 31-engine full-duration static fire of Booster 7 in February 2023.

SpaceX completed its first integrated flight test of Starship on 20 April 2023. The rocket had 33 Raptor 2 engines, but three of those were shut down before the rocket lifted off from the launch mount. The flight test was terminated after climbing to an altitude of ~39 km over the Gulf of Mexico. Multiple engines were out before the flight termination system (FTS) destroyed the booster and ship.

On the second integrated flight test, all 33 booster engines completed the full-duration ascent burn. All but three were then shut down for hot-staging, during which all six Starship engines ignited. The ship's six engines were commanded to shut down before the ascent burn was complete, followed by activation of the flight termination system.

On the third integrated flight test, all 33 booster engines completed the ascent burn. Following hot-staging, 13 engines relit for boostback, but six shut down early. Seven engines were commanded to start for the landing burn, of which two reached mainstage ignition. Contact with the booster was lost at about 462 metres above the Gulf of Mexico. The ship successfully kept all 6 engines lit until second stage / secondary engine cutoff without issues, however a planned in-space Raptor re-light was cancelled due to rolling during coast.

The seventh flight test featured the first reflown Raptor engine, which was successfully flown during Super Heavy Booster 14's ascent burn and was recovered after its successful catch by the launch tower. Booster 14 flew again on Starship's ninth test flight, the first reflight of a Super Heavy booster.

=== Starship ===
==== Original configuration ====
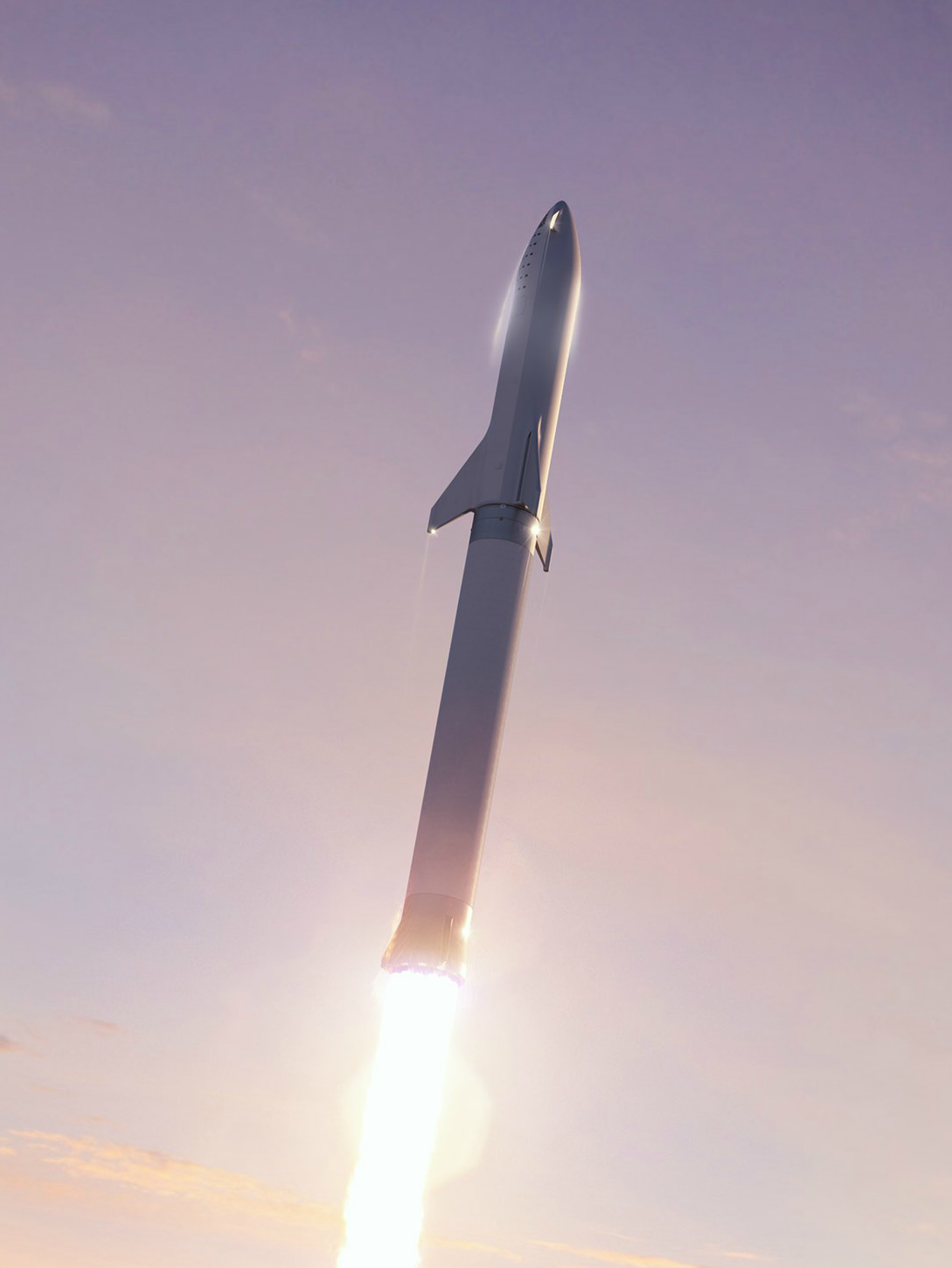
Big Falcon Rocket during ascent (artist's concept)

In September 2016, Raptor was projected to power the proposed Interplanetary Transport System (ITS), in the early 2020s. Musk discussed two engines: a sea-level variant (expansion ratio 40:1) with thrust of 3,050 kN (690,000 lbf) at sea level for the first stage/booster, and a vacuum variant (expansion ratio 200:1) with thrust of 3,500 kN (790,000 lbf) in space. 42 sea-level engines were envisioned in the high-level design of the first stage.

Three gimbaling sea-level Raptor engines would be used for landing the second stage. Six additional, non-gimbaling vacuum-optimized Raptor Vacuum engines would provide primary thrust for the second stage, for a total of nine engines. Raptor Vacuums were envisioned to contribute a specific impulse of 382 s (3,750 m/s), using a nozzle extension.

In September 2017 Musk said that a smaller Raptor engine—with slightly over half as much thrust as the previous designs—would be used on the next-generation rocket, a 9 m (30 ft)-diameter launch vehicle termed Big Falcon Rocket (BFR) and later renamed Starship. SpaceX said the smaller design was how it planned to pay for the system: one vehicle would replace Falcon 9, Falcon Heavy and Dragon, so the resources spent on them could go to BFR. With the much smaller launch vehicle, fewer Raptor engines would be needed. BFR was then slated to have 31 Raptors on the first stage and 6 on the second stage.

In the September 2017 presentation, Musk said the sea-level engines would have a specific impulse of about 330 s (3,200 m/s) at sea level and the upper-stage vacuum engine about 375 s (3,680 m/s).

Musk has said each engine needs to be capable of flying up to 1,000 times.

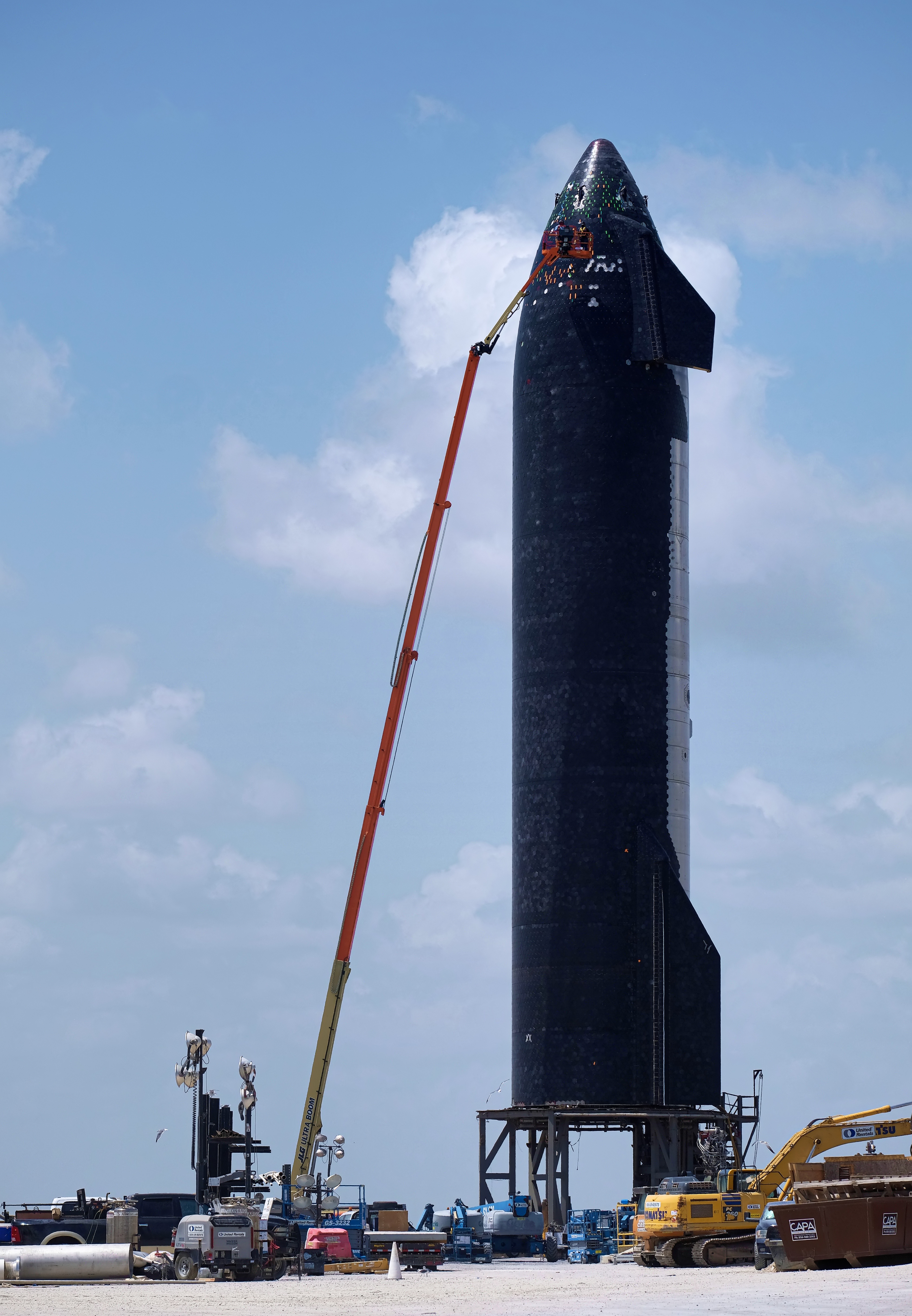
Starship SN20 has its tiles inspected

=== Proposed Falcon 9 upper stage ===
In January 2016, the United States Air Force (USAF) awarded a US$33.6 million development contract to SpaceX to develop a Raptor prototype for use on the upper stage of the Falcon 9 and Falcon Heavy. The contract required double-matching funding by SpaceX of at least US$67.3 million. Work was to be performed at NASA's Stennis Space Center in Mississippi, Hawthorne and Los Angeles Air Force Base. The USAF contract called for a single prototype engine and ground tests.

In October 2017 USAF awarded a US$40.8 million modification contract for a Raptor prototype for the Evolved Expendable Launch Vehicle program. It was to use liquid methane and liquid oxygen propellants, a full-flow staged combustion cycle, and be reusable.

=== Production ===
In 2021, SpaceX began building a second Raptor factory at its McGregor rocket development and test facility in central Texas, to produce the main stock of Raptor 2 engines while the Hawthorne factory in California focused on Raptor Vacuum and new design evolutions. The factory's framework was being assembled by October 2021.

== Versions ==
Raptor has evolved significantly since it was revealed.

SpaceX sea-level Raptor variants (August 2024 figures, except Raptor 3 thrust and thrust-to-weight ratio)
Version	Mass (kg)	Thrust, sea level (tf)	Specific impulse (s)	Engine only TWR
Raptor 1	2080	185	350	89
Raptor 2	1630	230	347	141
Raptor 3	1525	250	—	164

=== Raptor Vacuum ===
Raptor Vacuum (RVac) is a variant with a much larger nozzle that improves efficiency in space. The first Raptor Vacuum was test-fired at McGregor in September 2020. The first in-flight ignition of a Raptor Vacuum was on S25 during the second integrated flight test.

=== Raptor 2 ===
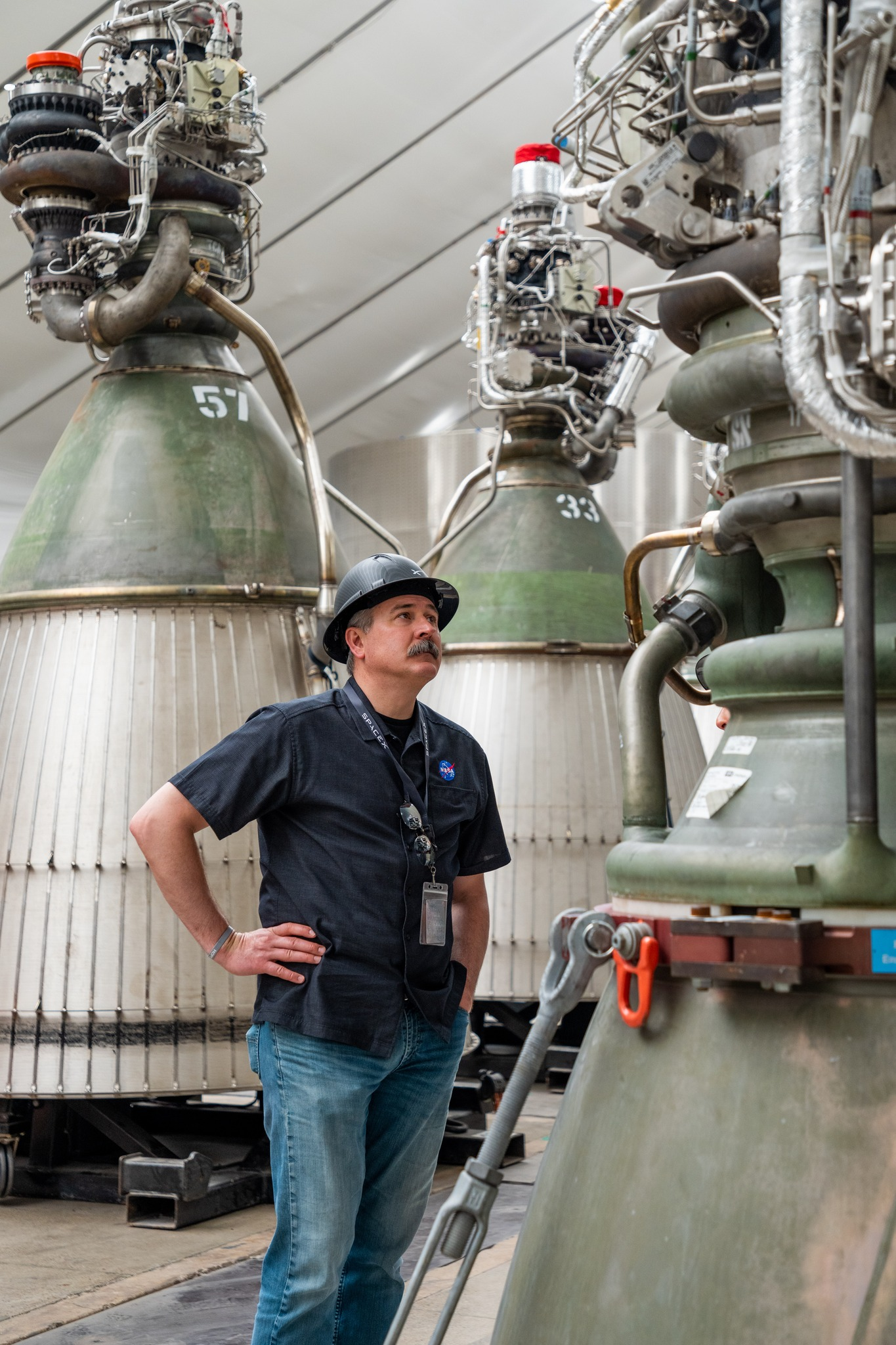
A NASA employee standing between two Raptor 2 vacuum-optimized engines (background) and a Raptor 2 sea-level (foreground).

Raptor 2 is a complete redesign of the Raptor 1 engine. The turbomachinery, chamber, nozzle, and electronics were redesigned. Many flanges were converted to welds, while other parts were deleted. Simplifications continued after production began. On 10 February 2022, Musk showed Raptor 2 capabilities and design improvements.

By January 2022, Raptor 2 had started production. By November 2022, SpaceX produced more than one Raptor a day and had created a stockpile for future launches. Raptor 2s are produced at SpaceX's McGregor engine development facility.

Raptor 2s were achieving 230 t_{f} (510,000 lbf) of thrust consistently by February 2022. Musk indicated that production costs were approximately half that of Raptor 1.

=== Raptor 3 ===
SpaceX aims for later versions of Raptor 3 to ultimately exceed 330 t_{f} (3.2 MN) of thrust in the booster/sea-level configuration. In April 2024, SpaceX's stated target for Raptor 3 was 280 t_{f} (2,700 kN) at sea level. In its May 2026 Starship V3 update, SpaceX stated that the flight engines produce 250 t_{f} (2,500 kN; 550,000 lbf) at sea level (up from 230 t_{f} for Raptor 2) and 275 t_{f} (2,700 kN; 610,000 lbf) for the vacuum variant (up from 258 t_{f}), with the sea-level engine mass reduced to 1,525 kg (3,362 lb) from 1630 kg; SpaceX said simplification of the engine and vehicle-side hardware saves about one tonne per engine at vehicle level, and that all variants use a redesigned ignition system.

The main goal of Raptor 3 was to eliminate protective engine shrouds by moving the majority of the plumbing and sensors into the engine's main structure, taking advantage of the already present regenerative cooling. In August 2024, SpaceX released pictures and specifications of Raptor 3, and the engine was test-fired at McGregor.

On 22 May 2026, Flight 12, the first flight of Starship V3, was also the first flight of Raptor 3. One of the booster's 33 Raptor 3 engines shut down about 1 minute 42 seconds into ascent; after stage separation several engines failed to relight for the boostback burn, which ended early, and the booster made a hard splashdown in the Gulf of Mexico. One of the ship's three Raptor Vacuum engines also shut down during ascent, but the ship reached its planned trajectory. The resulting mishap investigation, closed in July 2026, found the most likely causes of the booster's failed return were heat effects on engine components during ascent and erroneous engine alarm system settings.

On 24 July 2026, Flight 13 kept all 33 booster Raptor 3 engines running through ascent and completed the high-thrust portion of the boostback burn on all 33 engines for the first time with a V3 booster, but ended the burn early. Only a subset relit for the landing burn, and the booster made a hard splashdown. The ship relit a single Raptor in space and performed a landing burn with all three sea-level engines before a soft splashdown in the Indian Ocean.

On 28 September 2026, Flight 14 became the first Starship flight to reach orbit. One booster engine shut down during ascent, 31 of 33 relit for boostback and 11 of 13 for the landing burn. A Raptor Vacuum engine on the ship shut down early during ascent, which the remaining five engines compensated for by burning longer; a single sea-level Raptor was then relit for the orbit-insertion burn.

=== Raptor 4 ===
Musk has described a further version, Raptor 4. In November 2025 he wrote that it "should beat Merlin by >10X in $/ton of thrust, with further improvement in TWR and ISP". In October 2026 he said Raptor 4 was expected to produce 300 t_{f} (2,900 kN) of thrust at sea level at roughly the same mass as Raptor 3. In November 2026 he wrote that it was "so tempting" to build a 500 t_{f} (4,900 kN) Raptor 4 to replace the 250-tonne Raptor 3 engines in the outer ring of the Super Heavy booster.

=== LEET ===
In October 2021, SpaceX initiated an effort to develop a conceptual design for a new rocket engine with the goal of keeping cost below US$1,000 per ton of thrust. The project was called the 1337 engine, to be pronounced "LEET" (after a coding meme).

Although the initial design effort was halted in late 2021, the project helped define an ideal engine, and likely generated ideas that were incorporated into Raptor 3. Musk stated then that "We can't make life multiplanetary with Raptor, as it is way too expensive, but Raptor is needed to tide us over until 1337 is ready."

== Comparison to other engines ==
Engine	Rockets	Thrust	Specific impulse, vacuum	Thrust-to- weight ratio	Propellant	Cycle
Raptor 3 sea-level	Super Heavy, Starship	2,452 kN (551,000 lbf)	—	164	LCH_{4} / LOX (subcooled)	Full-flow staged combustion
Raptor 3 vacuum	Starship	2,697 kN (606,000 lbf)	—		LCH_{4} / LOX (subcooled)	Full-flow staged combustion
Merlin 1D sea-level	Falcon booster stage	914 kN (205,000 lbf)			RP-1 / LOX (subcooled)	Gas generator
Merlin 1D vacuum	Falcon upper stage	934 kN (210,000 lbf)	348 s (3,410 m/s)		RP-1 / LOX (subcooled)	Gas generator
Blue Origin BE-4	New Glenn, Vulcan	2,400 kN (550,000 lbf)			LCH_{4} / LOX	Oxidizer-rich staged combustion
Energomash RD-170/171M	Energia, Zenit, Soyuz-5	7,904 kN (1,777,000 lbf)	337.2 s (3,307 m/s)	79.57	RP-1 / LOX	Oxidizer-rich staged combustion
Energomash RD-180	Atlas III, Atlas V	4,152 kN (933,000 lbf)	338 s (3,310 m/s)	78.44	RP-1 / LOX	Oxidizer-rich staged combustion
Energomash RD-191/181	Angara, Antares	2,090 kN (470,000 lbf)	337.5 s (3,310 m/s)	89	RP-1 / LOX	Oxidizer-rich staged combustion
Kuznetsov NK-33	N1, Soyuz-2-1v	1,638 kN (368,000 lbf)	331 s (3,250 m/s)	136.66	RP-1 / LOX	Oxidizer-rich staged combustion
Rocketdyne RS-25	Space Shuttle, SLS	2,280 kN (510,000 lbf)	453 s (4,440 m/s)	73	LH_{2} / LOX	Fuel-rich staged combustion
Aerojet Rocketdyne RS-68	Delta IV	3,312 kN (745,000 lbf)	420 s (4,100 m/s)	51	LH_{2} / LOX	Gas generator
Rocketdyne F-1	Saturn V	7,740 kN (1,740,000 lbf)	304 s (2,980 m/s)	94	RP-1 / LOX	Gas generator

== See also ==
- Comparison of orbital rocket engines
- SpaceX Mars program
- SpaceX rocket engines
- SpaceX Starship (spacecraft)
- SpaceX Super Heavy
- Starship HLS
- SpaceX Starbase
