= Chris Clemons =

Chris Clemons may refer to:

- Chris Clemons (defensive end) (born 1981), American football player
- Chris Clemons (safety) (born 1985), American football player
- Chris Clemons (baseball) (born 1972), baseball player
- Chris Clemons (basketball) (born 1997), basketball player
