= Bluebonnet Ordnance Plant =

Coordinates: 31°24′34″N 97°26′39″W

Bluebonnet Ordnance Plant was a munitions plant near McGregor, Texas, which manufactured TNT, bombs, ammonium nitrate and similar products for the American troops during World War II. BlueBonnet Ordnance Plant was one of four ordnance plants in the United States during World War II.

== Pre World War II ==
During the earliest days of McGregor, Texas, the future site of Bluebonnet Ordnance was the crossroads of two railroads in 1879 (Santa Fe Railroad and the Cotton Belt Railroad). The site that would become the plant had fertile, rich soil which contributed to its usages years later. Gradually the McGregor area grew by over 1200 citizens in the 1920s setting the foundation for the founding of the plant a decade later.

== World War II ==
As the United States engaged in World War II, existing plants and equipment were considered for conversion to directly support the war effort. The National Gypsum Company of Buffalo successfully lobbied the United States War Department to purchase their 18,000 acre facility located near McGregor, Texas for the construction and operation of a munitions plant. On March 7, 1942; National Gypsum executives worked with Army engineers in Waco, Texas, to come up with the design and construction of the plant. The offices that were set up for this endeveour was located in the Armory and in the Waco library.

The plant was operated by the National Gypsum Company but overseen by the military and was one of the four Ordnance plants in the United States during World War II. The army engineers were in charge of all plant construction while the Gypsum personnel and others worked out other strategies. Bluebonnet Ordnance Plant got its name from Major Paul Van Tuyl, who named the plant after the state flower of Texas (Bluebonnet).

The munitions plant started production of bombs on October 16, 1942. Over 1100 automobiles and trucks went to and from the plant each day, taking workers to and from the plant. Many of the workers at the plant were from out of state, and even out of the region. The plant primarily manufactured TNT and ammonium nitrate used to fill bomb casings which were manufactured elsewhere. Production was focused on three bomb types: armor piercing, general purpose and fragmentation. Bluebonnet also produced other ordnance products, including 105-mm semi-fixed high explosive shells, bomb booster charges, and demolition blocks. At maximum production, the plant employed 5,732 workers. The plant ceased production on August 14, 1945.

== Post war ==
After the war, the facilities were converted to support the development and manufacture of ammonium nitrate based solid rocket propellants and operated by a number of successive companies: Phillips Petroleum Company (1952–1958), Astrodyne Incorporated (1958–1959), Rocketdyne (1959–1978), and Hercules Inc. (1978–1995). In 1995 Hercules transferred their operations to the Allegany Ballistics Laboratory in West Virginia, ending the manufacture of energetic materials at the site.

The overall size of the former Bluebonnet Ordnance Plant was reduced over time by the rededication of land to agricultural research and conversion into an industrial park. The now defunct Beal Aerospace established rocket engine testing facilities within the remaining portion before going out of business in October, 2000. The upgraded facilities are now used by SpaceX as their Rocket Development and Test Facility. Some of the wood from the Bluebonnet Ordnance Plant was used in the construction of a pizzeria in Waco in 2016.
