= Falcon 9 prototypes =

Test vehicles developed by SpaceX

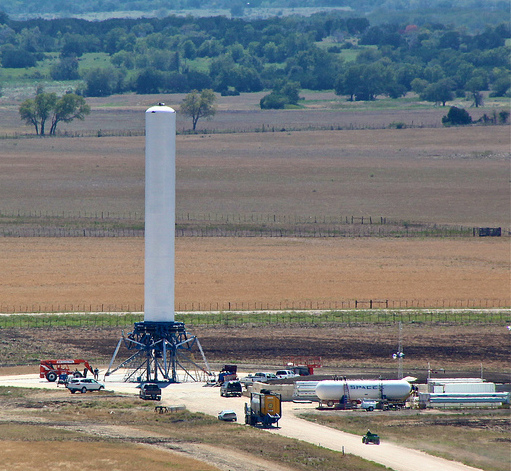
Grasshopper in September 2012

Falcon 9 prototypes were experimental flight test reusable rockets that performed vertical takeoffs and landings. The project was privately funded by SpaceX, with no funds provided by any government until later on. Two prototypes were built, and both were launched from the ground.

The earliest prototype was Grasshopper. It was announced in 2011 and began low-altitude, low-velocity hover/landing testing in 2012. Grasshopper was 106 ft (32 m) tall and made eight successful test flights in 2012 and 2013 before being retired. A second prototype of Falcon 9 was the larger and more capable Falcon 9 Reusable Development Vehicle (F9R Dev, also known as F9R Dev1) based on the Falcon 9 v1.1 launch vehicle. It was tested at higher altitudes and was capable of much higher velocity but was never tested at high velocity. The F9R Dev1 vehicle was built in 2013–2014 and made its first low-altitude flight test on 17 April 2014; it was lost during a three-engine test at the McGregor test site on 22 August 2014, which ended the low-velocity test program. Further expansion of the flight test envelope for the reusable rocket was moved to descending Falcon 9 boosters that had been used on orbital flight trajectories on commercial orbital flights of the Falcon 9.

The Grasshopper and F9R Dev tests were fundamental to the development of the reusable Falcon 9 and Falcon Heavy rockets, which require vertical landings of the near-empty Falcon 9 and Falcon Heavy first-stage booster tanks and engine assemblies. The Grasshopper and the F9R Dev tests led into a series of high-altitude, high-speed controlled-descent tests of post-mission (spent) Falcon 9 booster stages that accompanied the commercial Falcon 9 missions since September 2013. The latter eventually resulted in the first successful booster landing on 21 December 2015.

== History ==
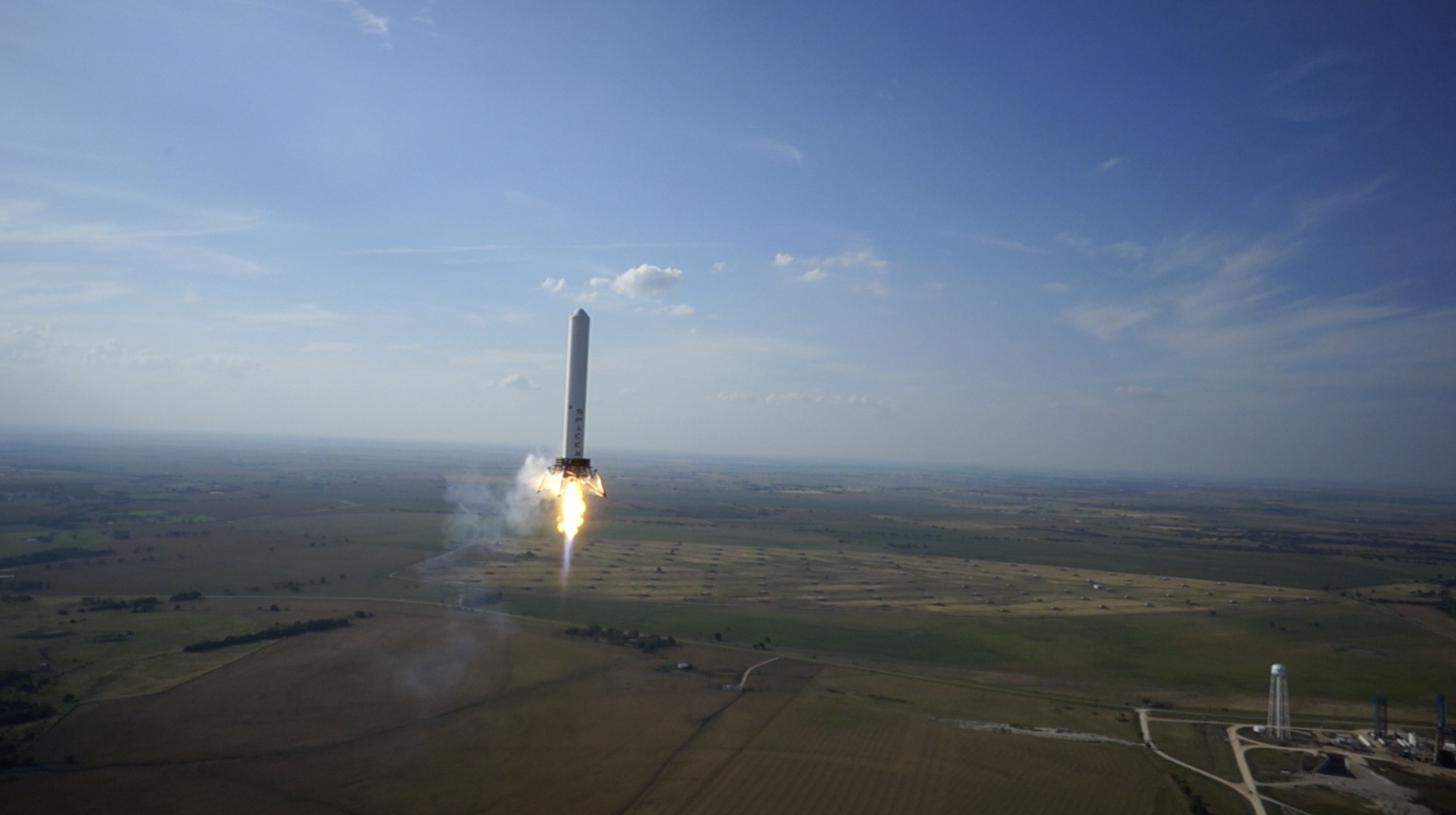
Grasshopper performing a 325-meter flight followed by a soft propulsive landing in an attempt to develop technologies for a reusable launch vehicle.

Grasshopper first became known publicly in the third quarter of 2011, when space journalists first wrote about it after analyzing space launch regulations of the Federal Aviation Administration.

Shortly thereafter, SpaceX confirmed the existence of the test vehicle development program, and projected it would begin the Grasshopper flight test program in 2012.

Releases of public information in 2011 indicated that the subsonic tests would occur in McGregor, Texas in three phases, at maximum flight altitudes of 670 to 11,500 ft (200 to 3,510 m), for durations of 45 to 160 s (0.75 to 2.67 min). At the time, testing was expected to take up to three years and the initial FAA permit allows up to 70 suborbital launches per year. A half-acre concrete launch facility was constructed to support the test flight program. In September 2012, SpaceX announced that they have requested FAA approval to increase the altitude of some of the initial test flights. Looking forward to the next year, CEO Musk said in November 2012: "Over the next few months, we'll gradually increase the altitude and speed. ... I do think there probably will be some craters along the way; we'll be very lucky if there are no craters. Vertical landing is an extremely important breakthrough — extreme, rapid reusability."

In May 2013, SpaceX announced that the higher-altitude, higher-velocity part of the Grasshopper flight test program would be done at Spaceport America near Las Cruces, New Mexico—and not at the Federal Government's adjacent White Sands Missile Range facility as previously planned—and signed a three-year lease for land and facilities at the recently operational spaceport. SpaceX indicated in May 2013 that they did not yet know how many jobs might move from Texas to New Mexico.

SpaceX began constructing a 30 m × 30 m (98 ft × 98 ft) pad at Spaceport America in May 2013, 7 km (4.3 mi) southwest of the spaceport's main campus, planning to lease the pad for US$6,600 per month plus US$25,000 per test flight.

== Description ==
=== Grasshopper ===
Grasshopper consisted of "a Falcon 9 [v1.0] first-stage tank, a single Merlin-1D engine" with a height of 32 m (106 ft). The landing gear was fixed.

As Elon Musk stated, Grasshopper could land on Earth with the accuracy of a helicopter.

=== F9R Dev1 ===
F9R Dev1 was constructed out of the used first-stage tank of the Falcon 9 v1.1, it was 160-foot tall, nearly 50% longer than the first Grasshopper. The landing legs were retractable by design, with a telescoping piston mounted on an A-frame. The total span of the four legs was approximately 18 m (60 ft) and the weight less than 2,100 kg (4,600 lb); the deployment system used high-pressure helium. The legs had less weight than on the first Grasshopper. The F9R Dev1 had a different engine bay than the first Grasshopper vehicle.

The F9R Dev1 vehicle in Texas was intended to take off and accelerate with three engines—as the test flight never needs the full thrust to take off a fully loaded Falcon 9 with an orbital payload—while completing the descent and landing with only one engine. The original Grasshopper had flown exclusively with only a single Merlin 1D engine in place, the center engine which is now used to complete the last phase of the deceleration and vertical landing on full-scale Falcon 9 rockets.

=== F9R Dev2 (never flown) ===
A third flight test vehicle—F9R Dev2—was initially planned to be flown only at the high-altitude test range at Spaceport America and at altitudes of up to 91,000 meters (300,000 ft). In September 2014, following the destruction of the F9R Dev1, SpaceX changed the plans, so the F9R Dev2 vehicle would fly first in McGregor for low-altitude testing. The initial FAA permit to fly the Falcon 9 Reusable Development Vehicle at McGregor in Texas was open until February 2015.

On 19 February 2015 SpaceX announced that the F9R Dev2 would be discontinued.

During April 2015, SpaceX performed tanking tests on the In-Flight Abort rocket on the Vandenberg Air Force Base SLC-4E. Since this rocket only had three Merlin 1D engines, and the New Mexico site was to have been used for testing the returned first stages, it was speculated that the discontinued F9R Dev2 was re-purposed as the launch vehicle in the In-Flight Abort Test.

In May 2015, a press article stated that due to the technical success of many aspects of the booster rocket landing attempts on the sea and on the ASDS, SpaceX was planning on using the New Mexico site for testing the returned stages.

== Flight testing ==
=== Grasshopper flight tests ===
The first Falcon 9 prototype, Grasshopper, made a total of eight test flights between September 2012 and October 2013. All eight flights were from the McGregor, Texas test facility.

Grasshopper began flight testing in September 2012 with a brief, three-second hop, followed by a second hop in November 2012 with an 8-second flight that took the testbed approximately 5.4 m (18 ft) off the ground, and a third flight in December 2012 of 29 seconds duration, with extended hover under rocket engine power, in which it ascended to an altitude of 40 m (130 ft) before descending under rocket power to come to a successful vertical landing. Grasshopper made its eighth, and final, test flight on October 7, 2013, flying to an altitude of 744 m (2,441 ft) before making its eighth successful vertical landing. The Grasshopper test vehicle is now retired.

Flight tests at the Texas facility were limited to a maximum altitude of 2,500 ft (760 m) by the initial FAA regulatory permit.

| # | Date (y-m-d) | Highest altitude | Duration | Video | Remarks |
|---|---|---|---|---|---|
| 1 | 2012-09-21 | 1.8 m (6 ft) | 3s | | A "brief hop" with a near-empty tank. |
| 2 | 2012-11-01 | 5.4 m (17.7 ft) | 8s | | |
| 3 | 2012-12-17 | 40 m (131 ft) | 29s | | First flight to include the cowboy mannequin |
| 4 | 2013-03-07 | 80 m (262 ft) | 34s | | Touchdown thrust-to-weight ratio greater than one |
| 5 | 2013-04-17 | 250 m (820 ft) | 58s | | Demonstrated ability to maintain stability in wind |
| 6 | 2013-06-14 | 325 m (1,070 ft) | 68s | | New navigation sensor suite tested; needed on the F9-R for precision landing |
| 7 | 2013-08-13 | 250 m (820 ft) | 60s | | Successfully completed a "divert test" performing 100 m (330 ft) lateral maneuver before returning to the pad. |
| 8 | 2013-10-07 | 744 m (2,440 ft) | 79s | | Final flight of Grasshopper. Vehicle retired after the flight. |

From the announcement in 2011 until 2014, SpaceX has achieved each of the schedule milestones that they publicly announced. SpaceX said in February 2012 that they were planning several vertical-takeoff, vertical-landing (VTVL) test flights during 2012, and confirmed in June 2012 that they continued to plan to make the first test flight within the next couple of months.

=== F9R Dev1 flight tests ===
The Falcon 9 Reusable Development Vehicle, or F9R Dev, was announced in October 2012. F9R Dev1 was initially named, since late 2012 until early 2014, as Grasshopper v1.1. In March 2013 Musk said that SpaceX hoped to reach hypersonic speed before the end of 2013. In March 2013, it was announced that the second Grasshopper-class suborbital flight vehicle would be constructed out of the Falcon 9 v1.1 first-stage tank that had been used for qualification testing in Texas at the SpaceX Rocket Development and Test Facility prior to March.

In 2014, the FAA permit was increased to 10,000 ft (3,000 m) for the F9R Dev testing at McGregor, when the first Grasshopper was limited to an altitude of 2,500 ft (760 m).

The F9R Dev1 was built on the much longer Falcon 9 v1.1 first stage tanks, and with retractable landing legs.

SpaceX performed a short-duration ground test (static test) of F9R Dev1 on March 28, 2014, at their McGregor, Texas test site, and made their maiden test flight of the new vehicle, to an altitude of 250 meters (820 ft), on April 17, 2014. The F9R Dev1 flew for the fifth and last time on August 22, 2014. During this flight, anomalous sensor data from the vehicle during its ascent caused the rocket to deviate from nominal flight trajectory, prompting its flight termination system to end the mission by neutralizing the vehicle. No injuries or near-injuries were reported following the breakup of F9R Dev1 and an FAA representative was present during the test. Video from the accident was released by CBS and multiple images from the accident were posted on social media.

| Test # | Date (year-month-day) | Test vehicle | Location | Highest altitude | Video | Remarks |
|---|---|---|---|---|---|---|
| 1 | 2014-04-17 | F9R Dev1 | McGregor | 250 m (820 ft) | | Hovered, moved sideways, landed successfully. |
| 2 | 2014-05-01 | F9R Dev1 | McGregor | 1,000 m (3,280 ft) | | Hovered, moved sideways, landed. |
| 3 | 2014-06-17 | F9R Dev1 | McGregor | 1,000 m (3,280 ft) | | First test flight with steerable grid fins. |
| 4 | 2014-08-01 | F9R Dev1 | McGregor | | | No public information was provided by SpaceX about this flight. |
| 5 | 2014-08-22 | F9R Dev1 | McGregor | | | Vehicle was destroyed following a flight anomaly that began to take F9R Dev1 off of its planned flight path. No injuries. A blocked sensor was the cause of the anomaly. The sensor had no backup in the prototype F9R Dev vehicle but flight-rated Falcon 9 rockets do have a redundant backup. First activation of an autonomous flight termination system on a US rocket. |

== Falcon 9 post-mission landing tests ==
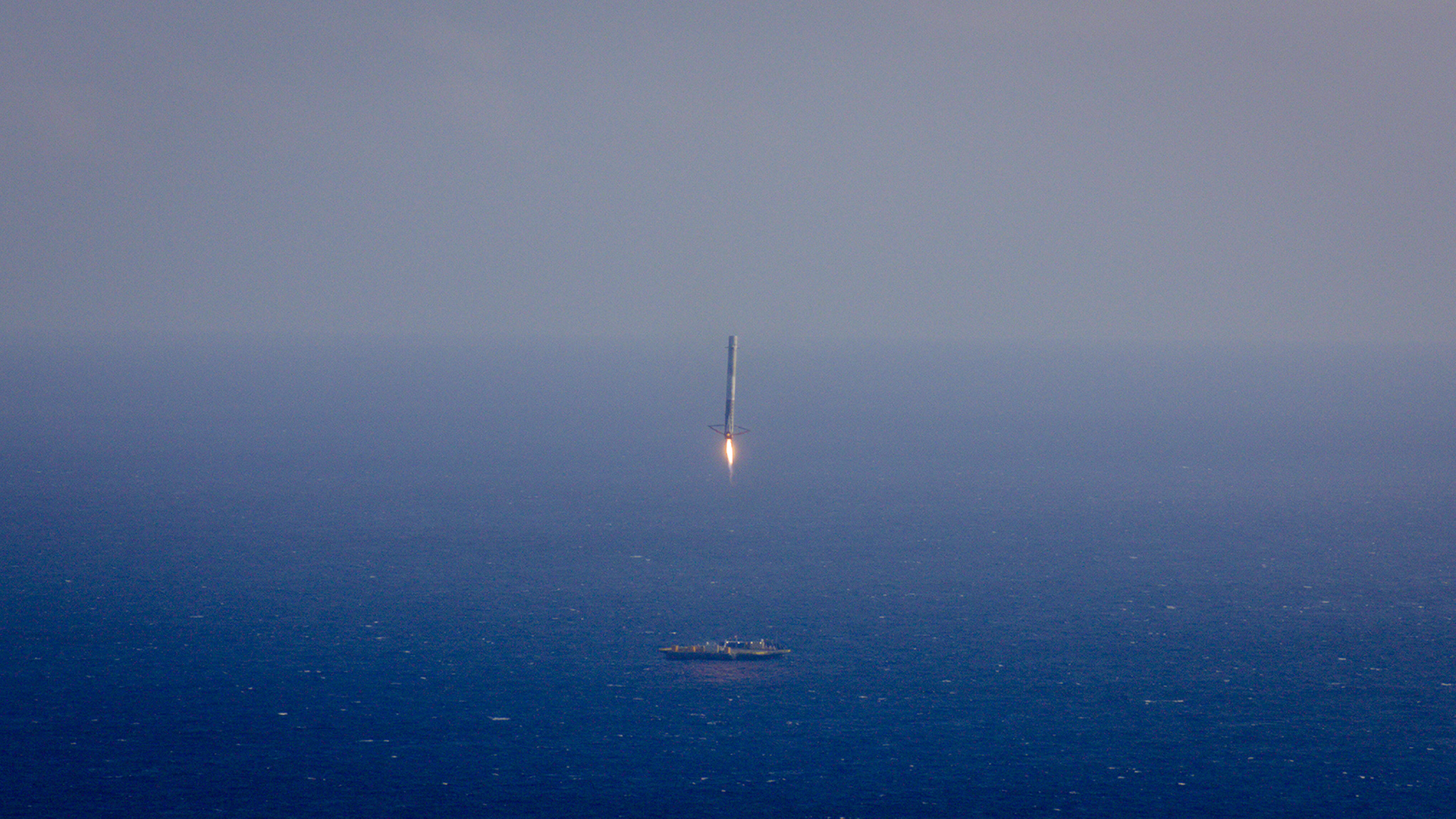
Falcon 9 first stage attempts landing on ASDS after second stage with CRS-6 continued onto orbit. Landing legs are in the midst of deploying.

In 2013, SpaceX moved to using their mainstream Falcon 9 vehicles for VTVL testing, in addition to their existing tests with flying test vehicles. In March 2013, SpaceX announced that, beginning with the first flight of the stretch version of the Falcon 9 launch vehicle—the sixth flight overall of Falcon 9 (then anticipated for summer 2013), every first stage would be instrumented and equipped as a controlled descent test vehicle. SpaceX attempted numerous over-water landings, both over the sea, resulting in soft landings into the water, and onto specialized Autonomous Spaceport Drone Ships, barges modified to be landing platforms. None were completely successful.

SpaceX eventually succeeded in landing a production vertical-landing rocket on land in late 2015. The first attempt to land the first stage of the Falcon 9 on land, near its launch site, occurred on Falcon 9 Flight 20, on 21 December 2015. The landing was successful, and the first stage of the Falcon 9 Full Thrust vehicle was recovered. By May 27, 2016, SpaceX had successfully completed three first-stage landings on a drone ship at sea.

== See also ==
- SpaceX launch vehicles – Launch vehicles developed and operated by SpaceX
- List of Falcon 9 first-stage boosters
- Kankoh-maru – Japanese orbital vehicle design
- McDonnell Douglas DC-X – Prototype single-stage-to-orbit rocket developed & flown between 1991-1996
- New Shepard – Rocket developed by Blue Origin
- Quad (rocket) – VTVL technology demonstrator
- Reusable Vehicle Testing – Japanese reusable rocket testing project
- SpaceX reusable launch system development program – Effort by SpaceX to make rockets that can fly multiple times
