= McGregor Independent School District =

School district in Texas

McGregor Independent School District is a public school district based in McGregor, Texas, United States.

In 2009, the school district was rated "academically acceptable" by the Texas Education Agency.

== Schools ==
- McGregor High School (grades 9–12)
- H.G. Isbill Junior High (grades 6–8)
- McGregor Elementary (grades 2–5)
- McGregor Primary (prekindergarten-grade 1)
