= SpaceX facilities =

Launch facilities used by SpaceX

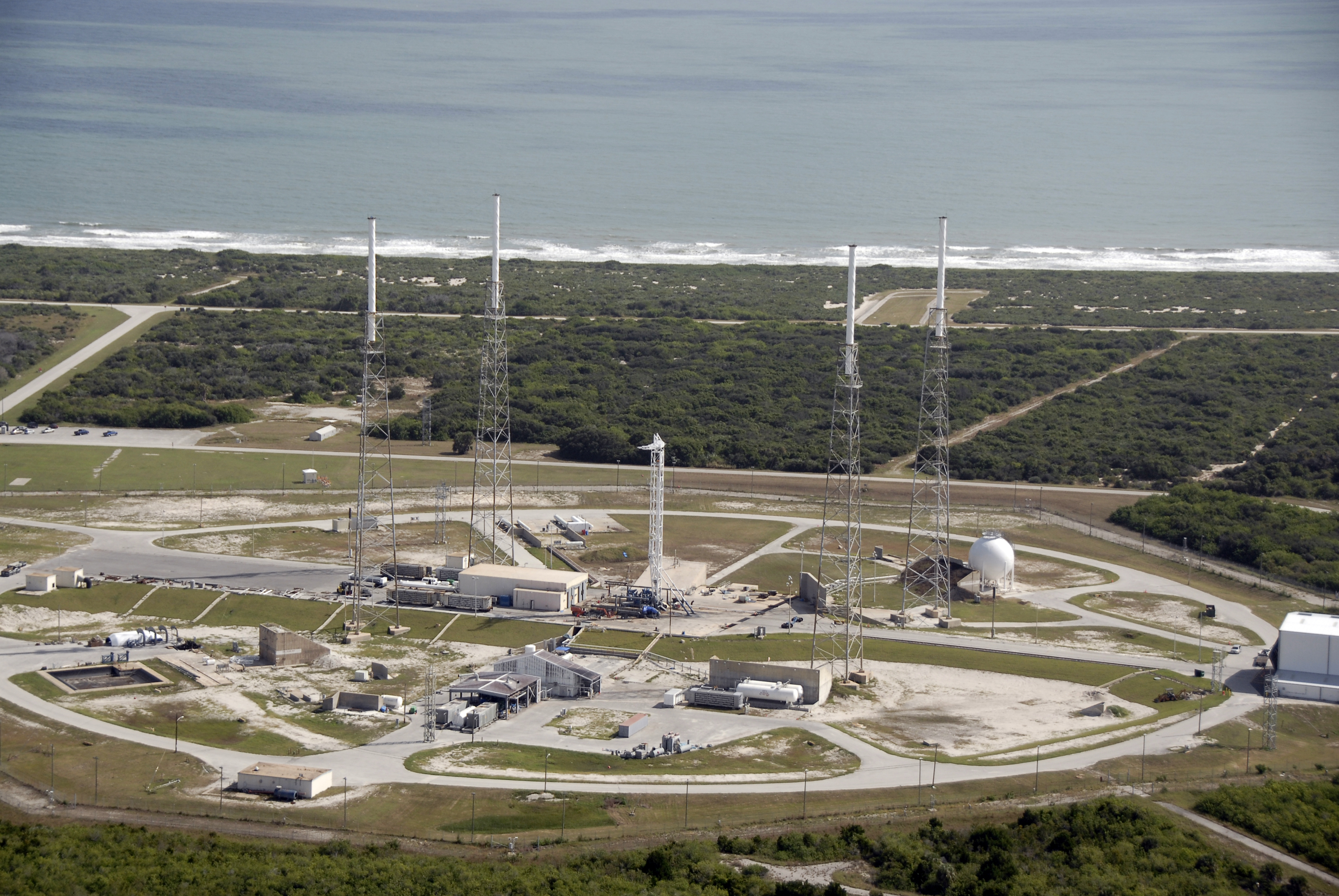
The Falcon 9 Cape Canaveral Space Launch Complex 40, Florida.

SpaceX operates four launch facilities: Cape Canaveral Space Launch Complex 40 (SLC-40); and, Kennedy Space Center Launch Complex 39A (LC-39A) – both in Florida; Vandenberg Space Force Base Space Launch Complex 4E (SLC-4E) in southern California; and, SpaceX Starbase in southern Texas.

Space Launch Complex 40 was damaged in the AMOS-6 accident on September 1, 2016, and repair work was completed by December 2017. Starbase Launch Pad 1 was damaged during the first Starship Launch on April 20, 2023, and repaired in under four months.

In addition, SpaceX uses a suborbital test facility, the SpaceX Rocket Development and Test Facility in McGregor, Texas. It is also where it tests all Merlin and Raptor engines, and flight article Falcon 9 first and second stages. A high-altitude suborbital test facility was under construction in New Mexico, but was abandoned following the switch to flight tests on commercial missions in September 2013.

SpaceX is currently building a second Starship launch pad at Starbase. Also, they are building three new Starship launch pads in Florida: one at LC-39A and two at SLC-37, most recently a United Launch Alliance (ULA) pad for their Delta IV family of rockets. A second Starship plant is also being built in Florida, at the Kennedy Space Center's Roberts Road facility. At Vandenberg, SpaceX has also taken over the former Delta IV pad, SLC-6, and is in the process of demolishing legacy Delta and Space Shuttle infrastructure still located there.

== Cape Canaveral Space Force Station ==
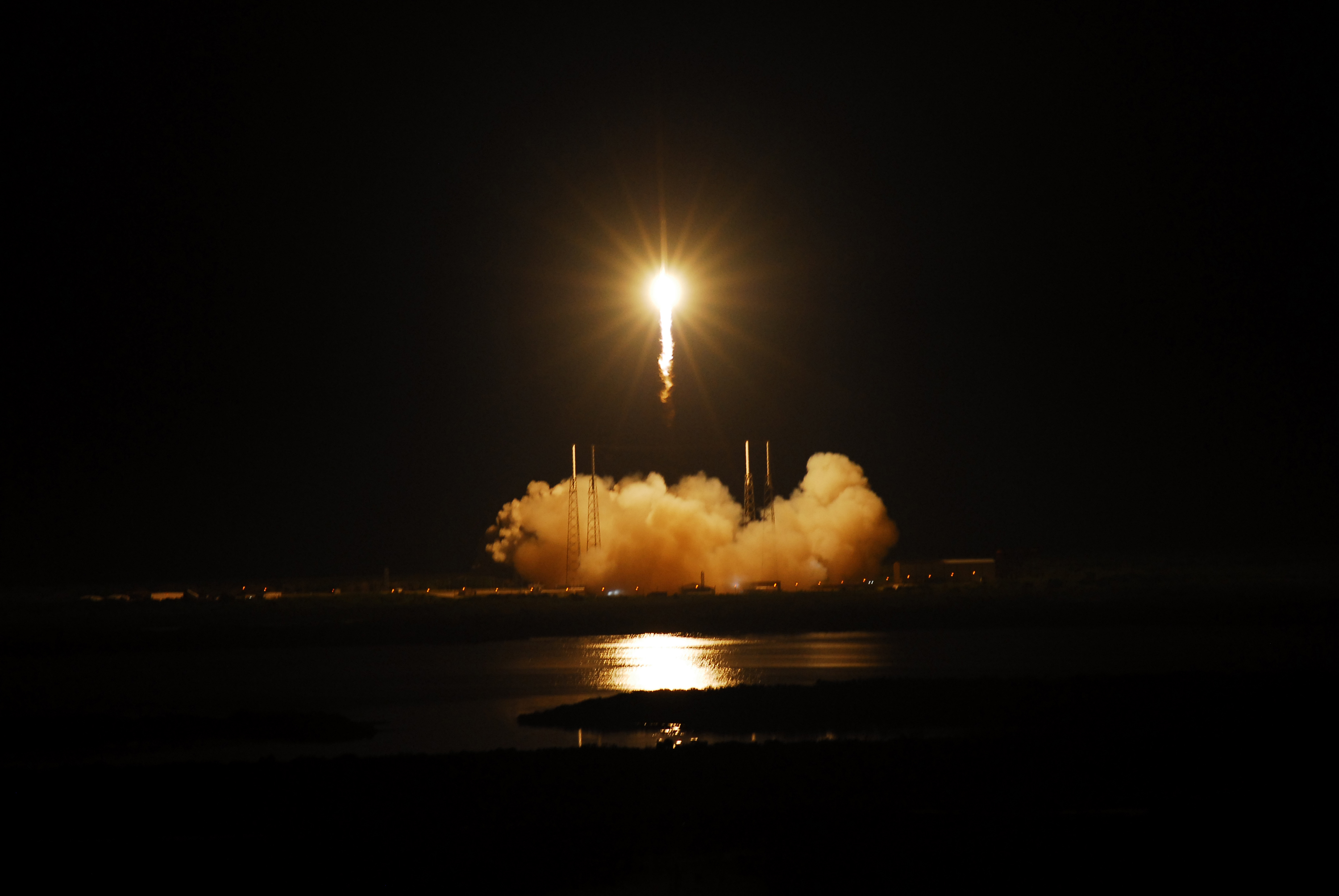
Falcon 9, Flight 3, above SpaceX Cape Canaveral launch complex, May 2012

=== SLC-40 ===
In 2007, the US Air Force leased Cape Canaveral Space Launch Complex 40 at the Integrate-Transfer-Launch Complex to SpaceX to launch the Falcon 9 rocket. During April 2008, construction started on the ground facilities necessary to support the launch of the SpaceX Falcon 9 rocket. Renovations included installation of new liquid oxygen and kerosene tanks and construction of a hangar for rocket and payload preparation.

The first Falcon 9 rocket arrived at SLC-40 in late 2008, and was first erected on January 10, 2009. It successfully reached orbit on its maiden launch on June 4, 2010, carrying a dummy payload qualification unit. SpaceX modified the launch pad in 2013 in order to support launches of the Falcon 9 v1.1 launch vehicle, a 60 percent heavier rocket with 60 percent more thrust on realigned engines and 60 percent longer fuel tank than the v1.0 version of the Falcon 9, requiring a modified transporter/erector.

In September 2016, the pad was damaged when a Falcon 9 rocket exploded during liquid oxygen loading in preparation for a hot-fire test. The pad was repaired and used for the first time since the explosion in the SpaceX CRS-13 mission in December 2017.

In 2016, SpaceX signed a five-year lease to use a 53,000 square foot (4,900 m^{2}) former Spacehab building at Port Canaveral. A new building nearby is also planned, and these facilities would be used to refurbish rockets.

=== SLC-37 ===
In February 2024, Ars Technica reported that SpaceX was abandoning plans for a future LC-49 at Kennedy Space Center, and instead is building launch pads at SLC-37. This launch site will have two Starship launch pads, in addition to the launch pad at LC-39A. Demolition of the old United Launch Alliance (ULA) Delta IV launch facilities began in June 2025.

== Kennedy Space Center ==
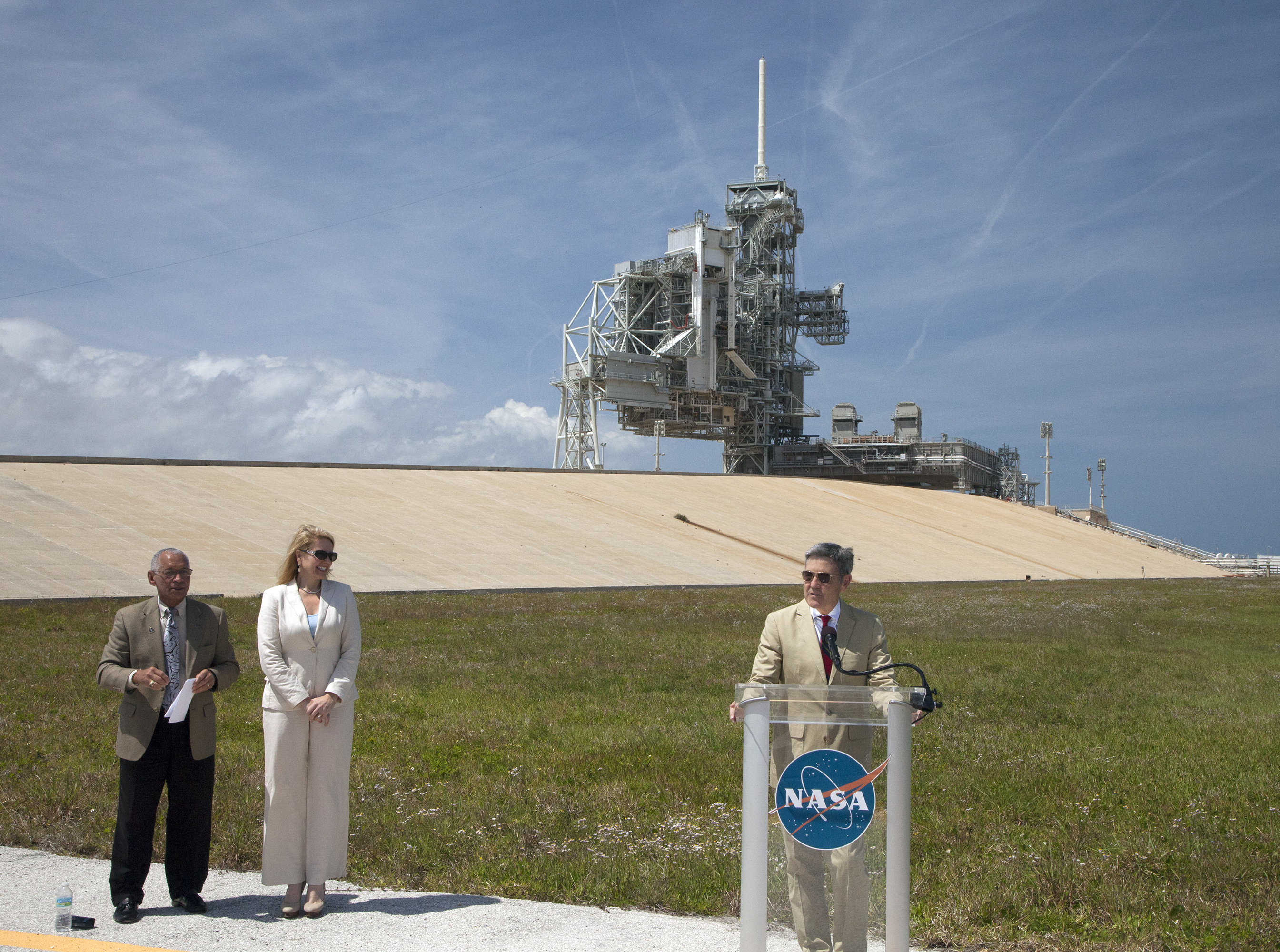
Robert D. Cabana, director of KSC, announces the signing of the LC-39A lease agreement on April 14, 2014.

In December 2013, NASA and SpaceX were in negotiations for SpaceX to lease Kennedy Space Center Launch Complex 39A, after SpaceX was selected in a multi-company bid process, following NASA's decision in early 2013 to lease the unused complex as part of a bid to reduce annual operation and maintenance costs of unused government facilities. The SpaceX bid was for exclusive use of the launch complex to support their future crewed missions, but SpaceX said in September 2013 that they are also willing to support a multi-user arrangement for LC-39A, and they reiterated that position in December 2013.

A competing bid for commercial use of the launch complex was submitted by Jeff Bezos' Blue Origin, who bid for a shared non-exclusive use of the complex such that the launchpad can interface with multiple vehicles, and costs of pad operational expenses could be shared over the long term. One potential shared user in the Blue Origin notional plan was with United Launch Alliance. In September 2013—prior to completion of the bid period, and prior to any public announcement by NASA of the results of the process—Blue Origin filed a protest with the U.S. General Accounting Office (GAO) over what it said was "a plan by NASA to award an exclusive commercial lease to SpaceX for use of mothballed space shuttle launch LC-39A." NASA planned to complete the bid award and have the pad transferred by October 1, 2013, but the protest delayed a decision until after the GAO resolved the protest. Following the eruption of the controversy, on September 21, SpaceX said that they were willing to support a multi-user arrangement for LC-39A. In December 2013, the GAO denied the protest and sided with NASA, which argued that the solicitation contains no preference on the use of the facility as multi-use or single-use. "The [solicitation] document merely asks bidders to explain their reasons for selecting one approach instead of the other and how they would manage the facility."

SpaceX began architectural and engineering design work on the pad modifications in 2013, and signed the contractual documents to lease the pad for 20 years from NASA in April 2014. SpaceX built a large Horizontal Integration Facility (HIF) just outside the perimeter of the existing launch pad in order to "house the Falcon [rockets] and associated hardware and payloads during processing." This is a marked difference from the vertical integration facility used by previous US government rockets that used the launch pad (Apollo Program and the Space Shuttle)—plus the installation of all new instrumentation and control systems, with substantial new plumbing for a variety of rocket liquids and gasses.

The Falcon rockets will be transported from the HIF to the launch pad aboard a Transporter Erector (TE) which will ride on rails up the former crawlerway path. In February 2016, it was reported that the pad was completed and activated indicating it is ready for launches of Falcon 9 Full Thrust. The first SpaceX launch from LC-39A occurred in February 2017, followed by a successful first-stage landing at Landing Zone 1. Further work was needed to support Falcon Heavy and crewed launches took over 60 days and occurred after Cape Canaveral LC-40 reopened. Demo-2, SpaceX's first crewed space mission launched from the Kennedy Space Center (KSC) LC-39A launch pad in May 2020.

In April 2018, SpaceX completed a draft environmental assessment for a new facility "that would include a booster processing hangar and launch control center on 67 acres (27 ha) of KSC property" to support a faster flight rate of "Falcon rockets, including processing of landed booster stages and recovered payload fairings for reuse."

In 2024, a proposal for SpaceX to add 100 acres to their existing footprint at KSC was approved pending the signing of a lease.

=== Future support ===
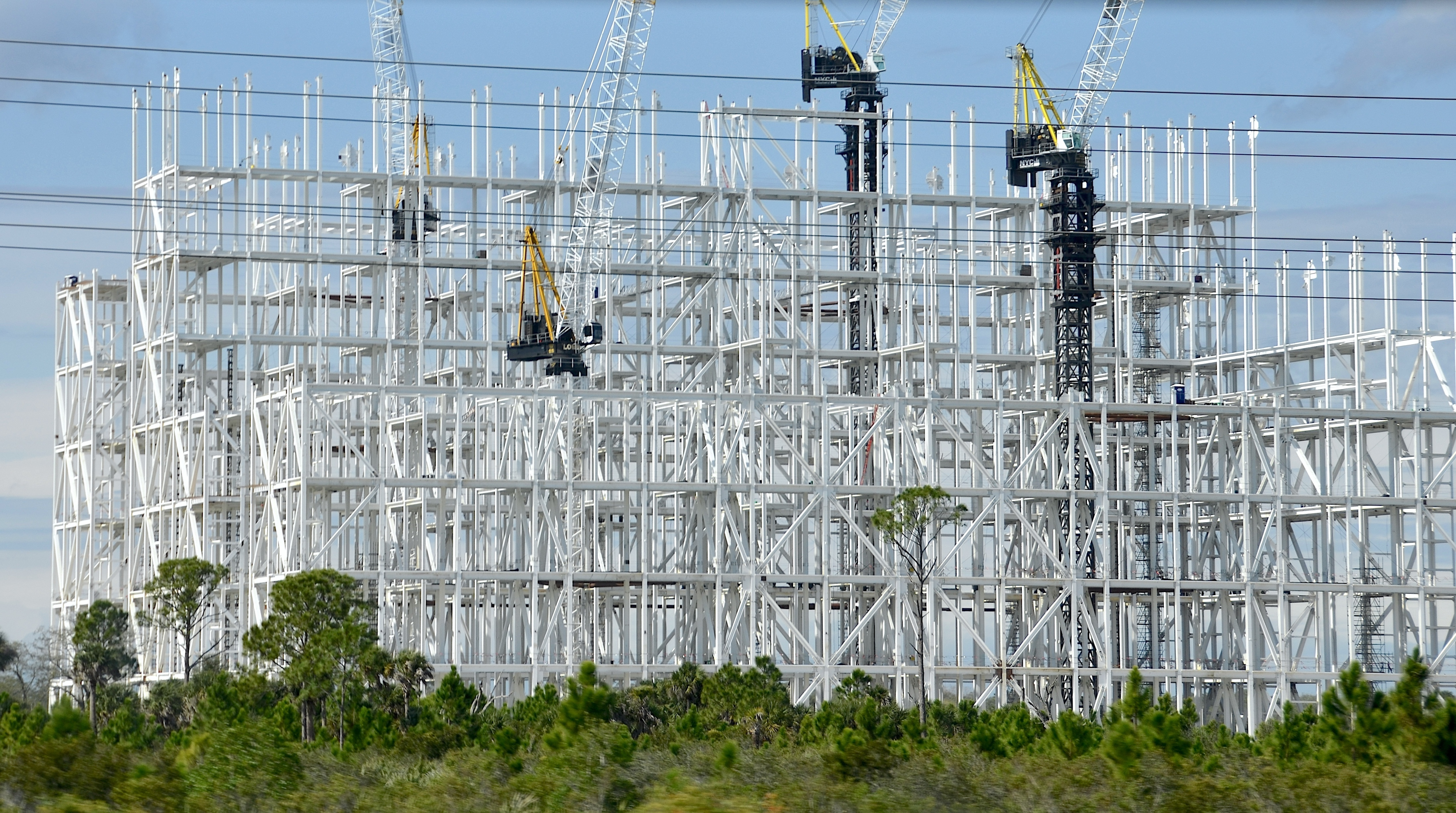
GigaBay under construction at Roberts Road in January 2026

The SpaceX Starship was initially deemed too large to launch from any existing SpaceX facility. In his September 2016 presentation, Elon Musk stated that the large launch vehicle would be launched from LC-39A. In 2025, SpaceX was mostly finished building a Starship Launch Pad at LC-39A. SpaceX is also in the process of building a Starfactory at their Roberts Road facility at KSC which will include a GigaBay to build Starship second stages and Super Heavy first stages.Currently, SpaceX is targeting to launch a Starship on a Starlink mission No Earlier Than 4th Quarter 2026.

== Vandenberg Space Force Base ==
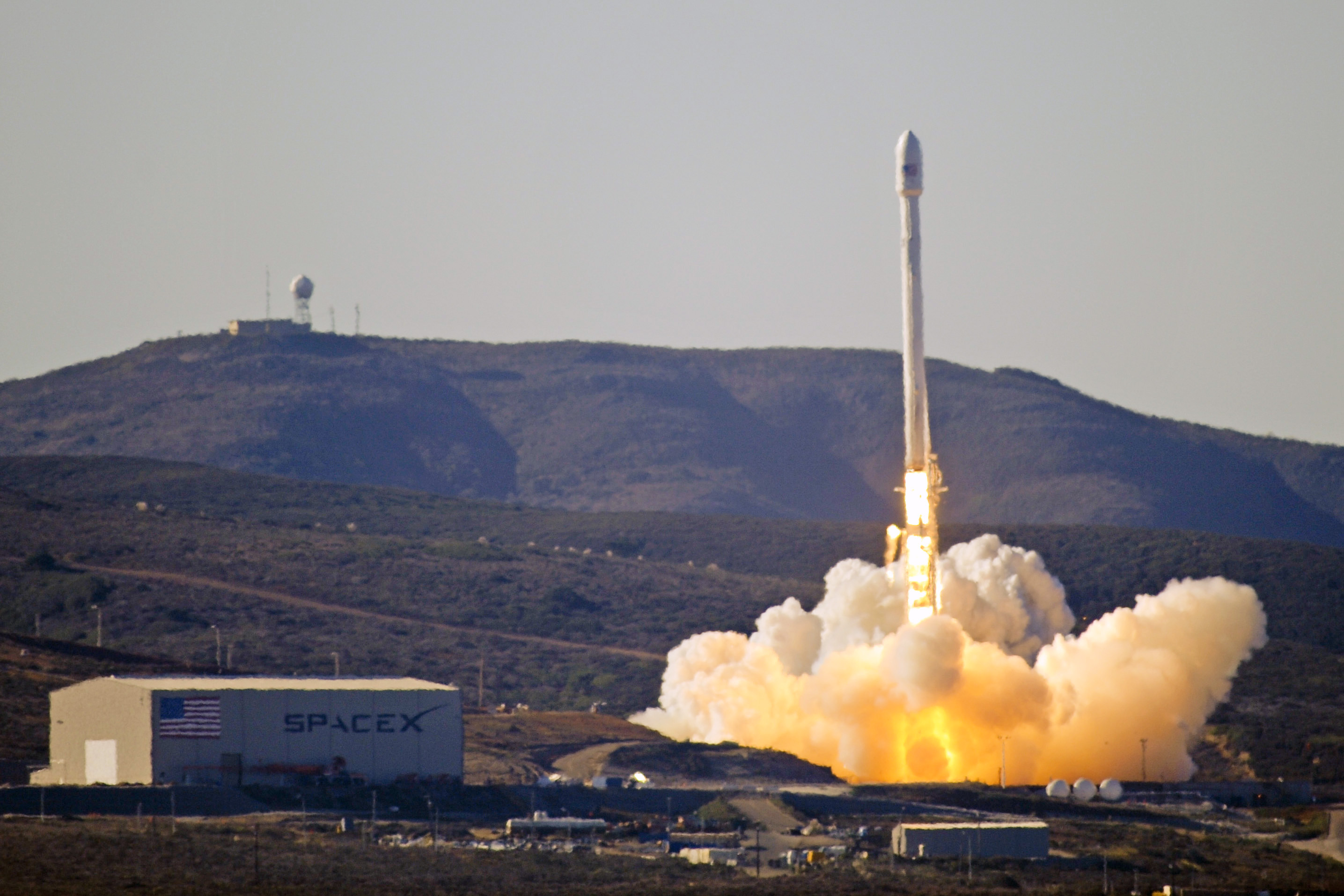
SpaceX west coast launch facility at Vandenberg Space Force Base, during the launch of CASSIOPE, September 2013

SpaceX currently operates a West Coast launch site located at Vandenberg Space Force Base Space Launch Complex 4 in order to deliver satellites to polar or Sun-synchronous orbits with Falcon 9 and Falcon Heavy launches.

SpaceX broke ground at Vandenberg in July 2011. A 2011 estimate showed that the project was expected to cost between $20 and $30 million for the first 24 months of construction and operation; thereafter, operational costs were expected to be $5–10 million per year. The sixth flight of the Falcon 9 launch vehicle launched in September 2013, which was the maiden flight of Falcon 9 v1.1. The site was used for a second time in January 2016 for the Jason-3 launch (which was the last flight of Falcon 9 v1.1) and for a third time in January 2017 for the first of the Iridium Next launches.

On April 24, 2023, the United States Space Force announced that it was leasing Vandenberg Space Launch Complex 6 (SLC-6) to SpaceX for Falcon 9 and Falcon Heavy launches. SpaceX subsequently had 64 launches of the Falcon 9 in 2025 and plans for up to 82 launches in 2026. It may launch up to 100 times in both 2027 and 2028.

== Starbase, Texas ==
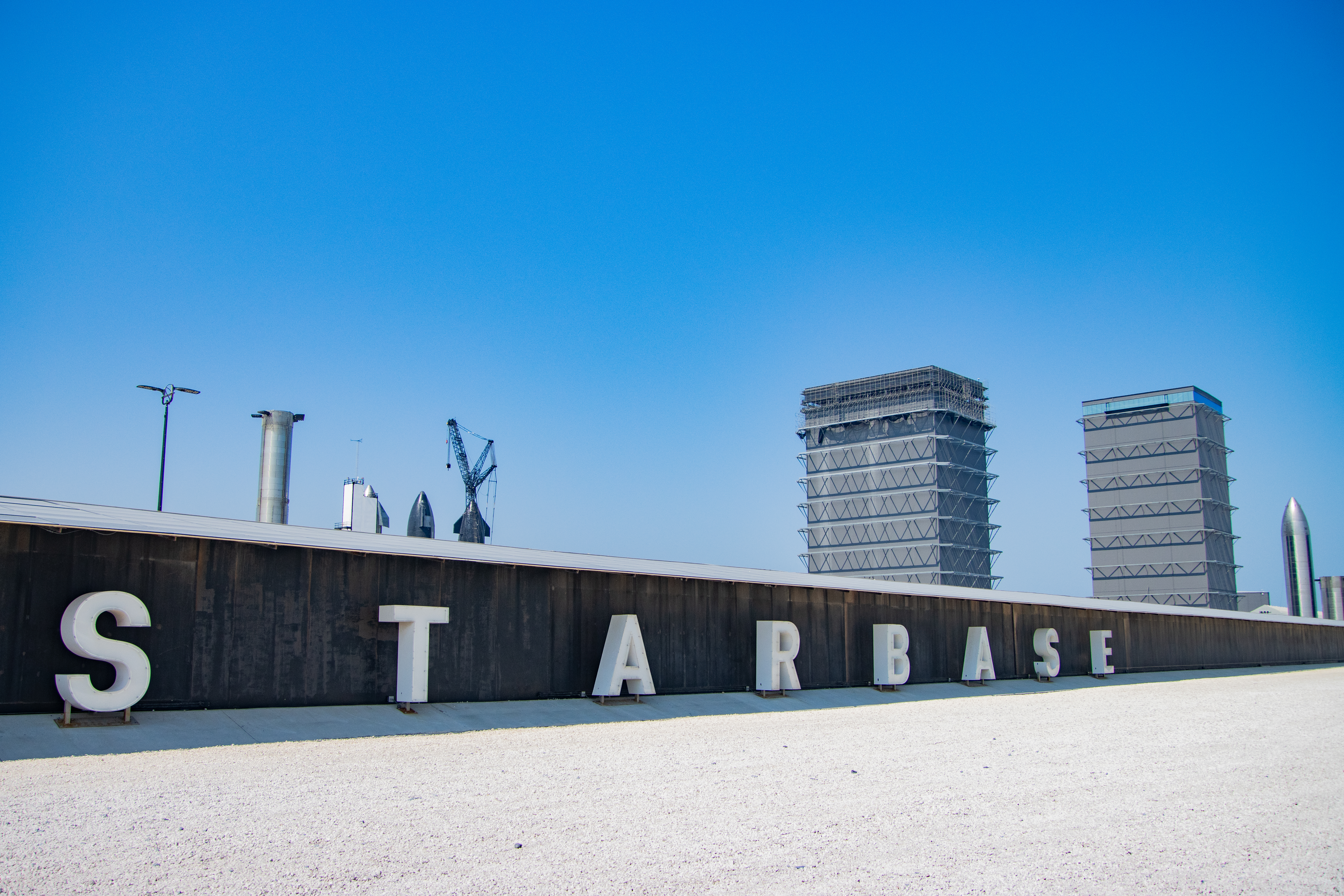
The sign with the base in the background

Starbase serves as the main testing and production location for Starship launch vehicles, as well as the headquarters of SpaceX. Located at Boca Chica, near Brownsville, Texas, United States, and adjacent to South Padre Island, Texas, Starbase has been under near-continuous development since the late 2010s, and comprises a spaceport near the Gulf of Mexico, a production facility at Starbase, and a test site along Texas State Highway 4.

During 2011–2014, SpaceX considered as many as seven potential locations around the country for a new private launch facility for orbital flights, including Alaska, California, Florida, Texas, Virginia, Georgia, and Puerto Rico. One of the proposed locations for the new commercial-mission-only spaceport was south Texas, which was revealed in April 2012, via preliminary regulatory documentation. The FAA's Office of Commercial Space Transportation began a multi-year process to conduct an Environmental Impact Statement and public hearings on the new launch site, which would be located in Cameron County, Texas. The FAA released the draft Environmental Impact Statement in April 2013, and "found that 'no impacts would occur' that would force the Federal Aviation Administration to deny SpaceX a permit for rocket operations near Brownsville."

As early as March 2013, Texas became the leading candidate for the location of the new SpaceX commercial launch facility, although Florida, Georgia and other locations remained in the running. Legislation was introduced in the Texas Legislature in early 2013 that would enable temporary closings of State beaches during launches, limit liability for noise and some other specific commercial spaceflight risks, while the legislature also considered a package of incentives to encourage SpaceX to locate at the Brownsville, Texas location.

SpaceX began acquiring land in the area, purchasing approximately 41 acres (170,000 m^{2}) and leasing 57 acres (230,000 m^{2}) by July 2014. SpaceX announced in August 2014 that they had selected the location near Brownsville as the location for the new private launch site. The announcement came after the final environmental assessment was completed and environmental agreements were in place by July 2014. SpaceX conducted a groundbreaking ceremony for the new launch facility in September 2014, and soil preparation began in October 2015.

The first tracking antenna was installed in August 2016, and the first propellant tank arrived in July 2018. In late 2018, construction ramped up considerably, and the site saw the fabrication of the first 9 m-diameter (30 ft) prototype test vehicle, Starhopper, which was tested and flown March–August 2019. Through 2021, additional prototype flight vehicles were being built at the facility for higher-altitude tests. By late 2023, over 2,100 full-time employees were working at the site.

On December 12, 2024, SpaceX filed an official request to Cameron County authorities to have the site incorporated as a new city, named Starbase.

== Other launch pads ==
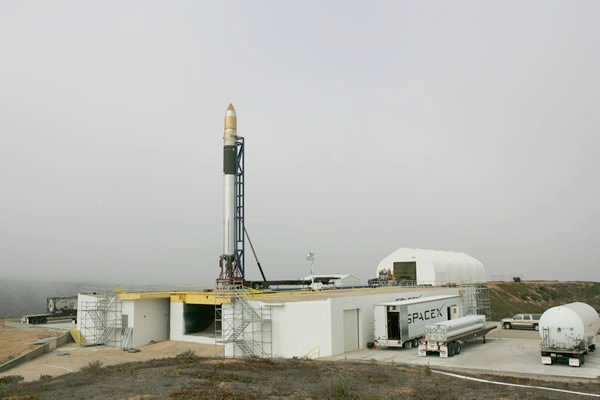
The first Falcon 1 at SpaceX's leased launch pad at Vandenberg Space Force Base, California. This vehicle was removed from VAFB due to delays and eventually launched from Omelek Island.

SpaceX originally intended to launch their first launch vehicle, the Falcon 1, from Space Launch Complex 3 West (SLC-3W) at Vandenberg Space Force Base. SLC-3W was modified by SpaceX to support the Falcon 1, and the Falcon 1 was erected on the pad in 2005. Problems arose when SpaceX was unable to obtain sufficient launch window availability because the pad would overfly other Air Force pads that were frequently left occupied for weeks or months at a time, thus severely restricting SpaceX launches. Ultimately, this launch pad was never used for orbital launch, although it was used for a number of ground tests.

SpaceX proceeded in 2005 to then build a launch facility in the northern Pacific Ocean at the Ronald Reagan Ballistic Missile Defense Test Site, on Omelek Island, a part of the Kwajalein Atoll, Marshall Islands. SpaceX began launching Falcon 1 rockets from Omelek in March 2006. Falcon 1 Flight 4 was the first successful privately funded, liquid-propelled launch vehicle to achieve orbit, and was launched from Omelek Island on September 28, 2008, followed by another Falcon 1 launch on July 13, 2009, placing RazakSAT into orbit.

SpaceX originally planned to upgrade the Omelek launch site for use by the Falcon 9 launch vehicle, but later cancelled their plans to do so, and have since disassembled the entire installation. In December 2010, the SpaceX launch manifest listed Omelek (Kwajalein) as a potential site for several Falcon 9 launches, the first planned for as early as 2012. The "Falcon 9 Overview" document also offered Kwajalein as a launch option in 2010. Since then, the FAA Environmental Impact Report of May 2014 lists this site as non-operational and returned to its original state, to no longer be used, "Five Falcon 1 launches occurred at Omelek Island, Kwajalein Atoll. After these launches of the Falcon 1, the site was no longer needed and SpaceX closed the site and returned the property to pre-launch conditions". All Falcon 1 launches took place at this location, five launches from 2006 to 2009. SpaceX abandoned Omelek when Falcon 1 was retired, due to the expense of logistics.

== Suborbital test facilities ==
SpaceX has two rocket test facilities for vertical takeoff, vertical landing rockets: the SpaceX Rocket Development and Test Facility in McGregor, Texas and a leased test facility at Spaceport America in southern New Mexico. All SpaceX rocket engines are tested on rocket test stands, and low-altitude VTVL flight testing of the Falcon 9 Grasshopper v1.0 test vehicle are done at McGregor. High-altitude, high-velocity flight testing of Grasshopper v1.1 were planned to be done at Spaceport America. In addition to atmospheric flight testing, and rocket engine testing, the McGregor facility is also used for post-flight disassembly and defueling of the SpaceX Dragon following orbital missions.

Both flight test facilities are principally involved in developing and testing various elements of the SpaceX reusable launch system development program, with a goal to making future SpaceX launch systems fully and rapidly reusable.

=== SpaceX Rocket Development and Test Facility, McGregor, Texas ===
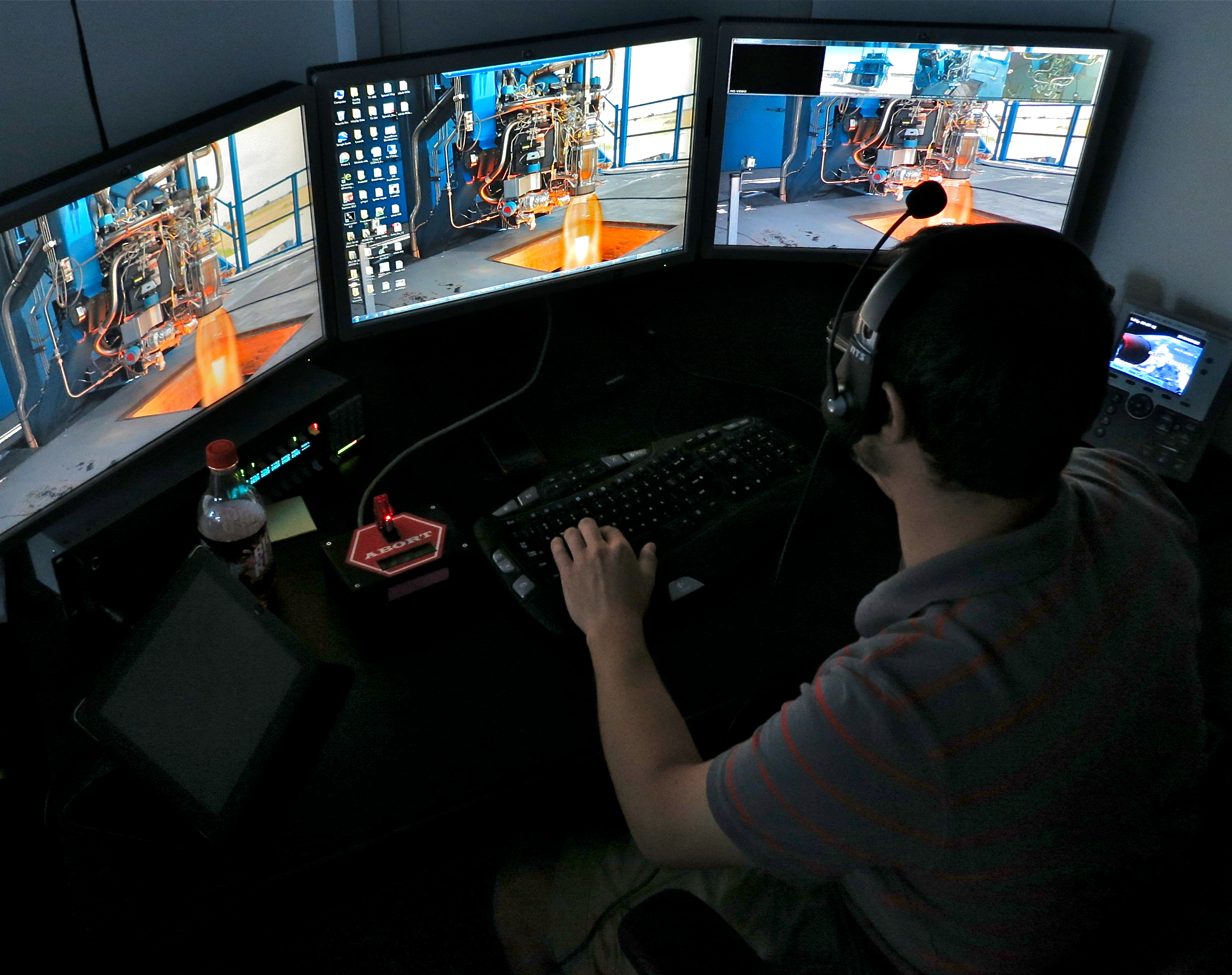
SpaceX McGregor engine test bunker, September 2012

SpaceX's Rocket Development and Test Facility in McGregor, Texas, is a rocket engine test facility. Every rocket engine and thruster manufactured by SpaceX must pass through McGregor for rigorous final testing, ensuring their reliability and performance before being used on flight missions. The facility also tests various components and engines during the research and development process.

SpaceX calls the facility the most advanced and active rocket engine test facility in the world, and said that by 2024, over 7,000 tests had been conducted at the facility since it opened, with seven engine test fires on a typical day. Despite its low-profile compared to the company's other facilities, is a critical part of SpaceX's operations, and company president and COO Gwynne Shotwell maintains her primary office in McGregor.

Leased by SpaceX in 2003, the McGregor facility was originally the site of the Bluebonnet Ordnance Plant during World War II, then was used as a testing facilities for Beal Aerospace. In its early days, SpaceX reused many of the leftover facilities from the previous occupants of the site to test its first Merlin engines, but over time it has undergone significant expansion and improvements. SpaceX has purchased adjacent farmland, increasing the facility's size from 256 acres (104 ha), to over 600 acres (240 ha) by April 2011, and to 4,000 acres (1,600 ha) by March 2015.

In 2011, SpaceX announced plans to upgrade the facility for launch testing of a VTVL test rocket, known as Grasshopper. A half-acre concrete launch facility was constructed to support the test flight program, which included eight flights of Grasshopper and five flights of its successor, "F9R Dev1." The flight test campaign ended in 2014.

By October 2012, the McGregor facility operated seven test stands, running 18 hours a day, six days a week. Since then, the number of test stands has increased to meet the growing demands of SpaceX's production. By March 2015, the facility operated 12 test stands and had run over 4,000 Merlin engine tests, including some 50 firings of the integrated nine-engine first stage. In August 2016, testing began on the new methane-fueled Raptor rocket engine. As of 2024, the facility sees seven engine test fires on a typical day.

In July 2021, SpaceX announced plans to build a second production facility for Raptor engines at the McGregor facility. The new facility is expected to produce 800 to 1,000 rocket engines per year, approximately 2 to 4 each day, significantly expanding SpaceX's production capacity.

=== SpaceX high-altitude test facility, New Mexico ===
As part of the SpaceX reusable launch system development program, SpaceX announced in May 2013 that the follow-up to Grasshopper, a high-altitude, vertical takeoff, vertical landing (VTVL) suborbital technology demonstrator would be tested at Spaceport America near Las Cruces, New Mexico. SpaceX signed a three-year lease for land and facilities at the recently operational spaceport. SpaceX never ended up using the New Mexico site for flight tests because high altitude return manoeuvre tests began in September 2013 with Falcon 9 v1.1 boosters already on orbital launch missions.

== See also ==
- SpaceX reusable launch system development program
- SpaceX Landing Zone
