= Rocket engine test facility =

Location where rocket engines may be tested on the ground, under controlled conditions

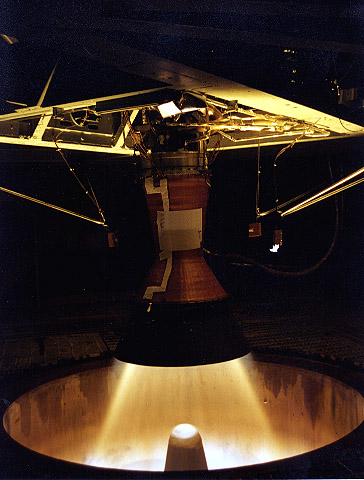
Rocket firing at the WSTF

A rocket engine test facility is a location where rocket engines may be tested on the ground, under controlled conditions. A ground test program is generally required before the engine is certified for flight. Ground testing is very inexpensive in comparison to the cost of risking an entire mission or the lives of a flight crew.

The test conditions available are usually described as sea level ambient or altitude. Sea level testing is useful for evaluations of start characteristics for rockets launched from the ground. However, sea level testing does not provide a true simulation of the majority of the operating environment of the rocket. Better simulations are provided by altitude test facilities.

== Sea level tests ==
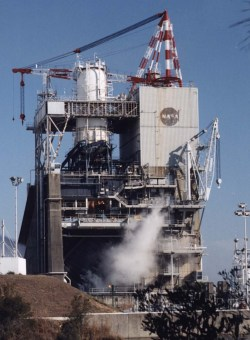
Sea Level engine test stand at the John C. Stennis Space Center

The facility must restrain the rocket and direct the rocket exhaust safely toward the open atmosphere. Structural integrity, system operations, and sea level thrust can be measured and verified. However, rockets are primarily intended for operations in very thin or no atmosphere. Systems that work well on the ground may behave very differently in space.

A typical sea level test stand may be designed to restrain the rocket engine in either a horizontal or vertical position. Liquid rocket engines are usually fired in a vertical position because the propellant pump intakes are designed to draw fuel from the bottoms of the fuel tanks. The effect of the propellant weight on the thrust measurement system (TMS) must be accounted for as the engine is firing. The rocket exhaust is directed into a flame bucket or trench. The flame trench is designed to redirect the hot exhaust to a safe direction and is protected by a water deluge system that both cools the exhaust and also reduces the sound pressure level (loudness). The sound pressure level of large rocket engines has been measured at greater than 200 decibels — one of the loudest man-made sounds.

Solid rocket engines may be fired in either a vertical or horizontal orientation. The thrust measurement system does not need to account for the changing weight of the rocket in a horizontal position. The associated flame trench need not be so sturdy as with a vertical test stand, however a water system may be less effective at reducing the sound pressure level.

All test stands require safety provisions to protect against the destructive potential of an unplanned engine detonation. The safety provisions generally include building the stand some minimum distance from inhabited areas or other critical facilities, placing the stand behind a thick concrete blast wall or earthen berm, and using some form of inerting system (either gaseous nitrogen or helium) to eliminate the buildup of explosive mixtures.

== Altitude tests ==
The advantage of altitude testing is to obtain a better simulation of the rocket's operating environment. Air pressure decreases with increasing altitude. Effects of the lower air pressure include higher rocket thrust and lower heat transfer.

An altitude facility is much more complex than a sea level facility. The rocket is installed inside an enclosed chamber which is evacuated to a minimum pressure level before rocket firing. A typical chamber operating pressure of 0.16 psia (equivalent to an altitude of 100,000 feet) is established inside the chamber by some form of mechanical pumping. Mechanical pumping is typically provided by steam ejector/diffusers. If the products of combustion from the rocket firing include flammable or explosive materials, the chamber must be inerted, typically with gaseous nitrogen (GN2). The inerting process prevents build-up of potentially explosive materials inside the chamber or exhaust ducting.

== Rocket ground test facilities ==
=== Test facilities in the United States ===
- California
  - Active
    - United States Air Force's Air Force Research Laboratory Propulsion Directorate at Edwards Air Force Base, California
    - United States Navy's Skytop Rocket Test Propulsion Facility at Naval Air Weapons Station China Lake, California
    - United States Navy's Naval Base Ventura County's facility on San Nicolas Island, California
    - United States Space Force's Space Systems Command's facilities at Vandenberg Space Force Base
    - Astra (American spaceflight company)'s testing facility in Alameda, California
    - Astra (American spaceflight company)'s testing facility at former Castle Air Force Base in Atwater, California
    - Lockheed Martin's Santa Cruz Facility in Santa Cruz, California
    - Northrop Grumman's Capistrano Test Site near San Clemente, California
    - Mojave Air and Space Port's rocket testing facilities
    - National Technical Systems' NTS Rocket and Fluids Test Laboratory at San Bernardino International Airport in San Bernardino, California
  - Dormant
    - Douglas Aircraft Company's and Rocketdyne's SACTO facility in Rancho Cordova, California
    - Lockheed Propulsion Company's and Grand Central Rocket Company's Potrero Canyon and Laborde Canyon test sites
    - Lockheed Propulsion Company's Redlands Proving Grounds in Redlands, California and Loma Linda, California
    - Marquardt Corporation's Remote Rocket Engine Test Facility in the Angeles National Forest
    - NASA's Jet Propulsion Laboratory sites at Edwards Air Force Base and Goldstone, California
    - Rocketdyne's Santa Susana Field Laboratory
    - United Technologies's Coyote Ridge testing sites south of San Jose, California
- Ursa Major Test Site, East of Berthoud, Colorado
- Northrop Grumman Innovation Systems, Promontory, Utah (formerly Morton-Thiokol, Thiokol, ATK, Orbital ATK)
- Northrop Grumman, Elkton, Maryland (Formally Thiokol, Elkton Controls)
- Marshall Space Flight Center
- Plum Brook Station
- White Sands Test Facility (WSTF) at Las Cruces, New Mexico
- Stennis Space Center at Hancock County, Mississippi
- United States Air Force Arnold Engineering Development Center
- New Mexico Tech's Energetic Materials Research and Testing Center
- SpaceX Rocket Development and Test Facility at McGregor, Texas
- SpaceX high-altitude test facility at Las Cruces, New Mexico
- Blue Origin's Corn Ranch at Van Horn, Texas
- XCOR Aerospace Engine Test Facility at Mojave, California

=== Rocket ground test facilities outside the United States ===
- Sea- level and High Altitude Test Facilities- Satish Dhawan Space Centre SHAR, Sriharikota, Andhra Pradesh, India
- DLR Lampoldshausen - Baden-Württemberg, Germany, European Union
- ISRO Propulsion Complex - Mahendragiri, Tamil Nadu, India
- NII-229 (NIIKhIMMash) - Zagorsk, Moscow Oblast, Russia
- RAF Spadeadam - (No longer in use) United Kingdom.
- Woomera Test Range - South Australia
- High Down Rocket Test Site - (No longer in use) United Kingdom.
- Refshaleøen, Copenhagen, Denmark, European Union, Used by Copenhagen Suborbitals, a private non-profit organisation operating on open source principles

== Bibliography ==
- Sutton, G.P., (1976) Rocket Propulsion Elements ISBN 0-471-83836-5
- Lawrie, A., (2005) Saturn ISBN 1-894959-19-1
- Bilstein, R.E., (2003) Stages To Saturn ISBN 0-8130-2691-1
