= McGregor High School (Texas) =

Location
- 903 Bluebonnet Parkway; McGregor, Texas 76657-1974; United States; 31.426775°N 97.404919°W

Information
- School type: Public high school
- School district: McGregor Independent School District
- Principal: Stephanie Zamora
- Staff: 39.95 (FTE)
- Grades: 9–12
- Enrollment: 427 (2023–2024)
- Student to teacher ratio: 10.60
- Colors: Black & Gold
- Athletics conference: UIL Class 3A
- Mascot: Bulldog
- Yearbook: The Bulldog
- Website: McGregor High School

McGregor High School is a public high school located in McGregor, Texas; it is classified as a 3A school by the UIL and is part of the McGregor Independent School District located in McLennan County. In 2015, the school was rated "met standard" by the Texas Education Agency.

== Athletics ==
McGregor High School participates in these sport:

- Baseball
- Basketball
- Cross-country running
- Football
- Golf
- Powerlifting
- Softball
- Tennis
- Track and field
- Volleyball

=== State finalists ===
- Football - 1979 (2A), 1987 (3A)
- Boys' basketball - 1957 (1A)
- State champions— 2019 3A Girls' golf
  - Paige Gilstrap, Maggie Parmer, Kiley Coats, Abby DeJesus, Bella Valdez
  - Head coach: Jason Parsons

== Rocket science ==
McGregor High School is a member school of IGNITE SystemsGo, an aeroscience education program. MHS participates in an annual gathering of all participating schools at Fredericksburg, Texas, where they can launch their rockets.

== Robotics ==
MHS hosts a BEST Robotics team, whose goal is to build a robot with given materials, create a project notebook detailing the design aspects of the robot, direct a booth presenting more information about their robot to a judging team, and participate in a school spirit event.

2010 - Awards: 1st Place Overall, 2nd Place Robot, Best Project Notebook, Most Robust Machine, Highest Scoring Round.
