= Beal Aerospace =

American launch vehicle company

- Company type: Aerospace technology, launch vehicles
- Founded: 1997
- Founder: Andrew Beal
- Defunct: October 23, 2000
- Headquarters: Frisco, Texas
- Number of employees: 200

Beal Aerospace was a launch vehicle development company founded in February 1997 by Andrew Beal, president of Beal Bank in Dallas, Texas. Headquartered in Frisco, Texas, the goal of the company was to build and operate a privately developed heavy lift orbital launch vehicle. It ceased operations on October 23, 2000.

== Company history ==
After being founded in 1997, employment grew to approximately 200 people at the company's peak in late 1999. A rocket engine test facility was successfully established in McGregor, Texas. There, the company conducted liquid-fueled engine tests, added several buildings, and built a vertical test stand. Ambitious plans were made to establish a launch pad on Sombrero Island in Anguilla, and to mass-produce launch vehicles in the Virgin Islands, but environmentalists were fiercely opposed to these development plans.

On March 4, 2000, Beal Aerospace conducted a successful test firing of the BA-2 rocket engine, the largest since the NASA Apollo program.

Following NASA's announcement that they would fund research and development of competing launch vehicles under the Space Launch Initiative (SLI), Andrew Beal announced on October 23, 2000, that Beal Aerospace would cease operations. Beal cited NASA's commercial practices as the primary reason for closing.

== Launch vehicles ==
Beal Aerospace initially considered a rocket that used kerosene and liquid oxygen, but soon switched to kerosene fuel in combination with high concentration hydrogen peroxide oxidizer. This combination was selected in order to avoid the expense and complexity of cryogenic storage, and to reduce development costs. Kerosene was injected into the hot steam and oxygen exhaust products of catalytically decomposed hydrogen peroxide, resulting in spontaneous ignition. The original BA-1 launch vehicle design was intended to service the LEO (Low Earth Orbit) satellite constellation launch market, but was replaced by the much larger BA-2 design when it was decided to concentrate on the more stable Geostationary satellite launch market as the LEO constellations became financially unsound. All three stages of the BA-2 vehicle were to be pressure-fed using high-pressure helium storage to replace the expense and complexity of turbopumps. All of the BA-2 propellant tanks and primary structures were to be manufactured from lightweight composite materials. The engines were self-cooled with ablative materials.

== Subsequent history ==
After the dissolution of Beal Aerospace, its McGregor, Texas test site was acquired by SpaceX to become its McGregor test site in late 2002.

== See also ==
- List of private spaceflight companies - A compiled list of private spaceflight companies
