= McGregor, Texas =

- City
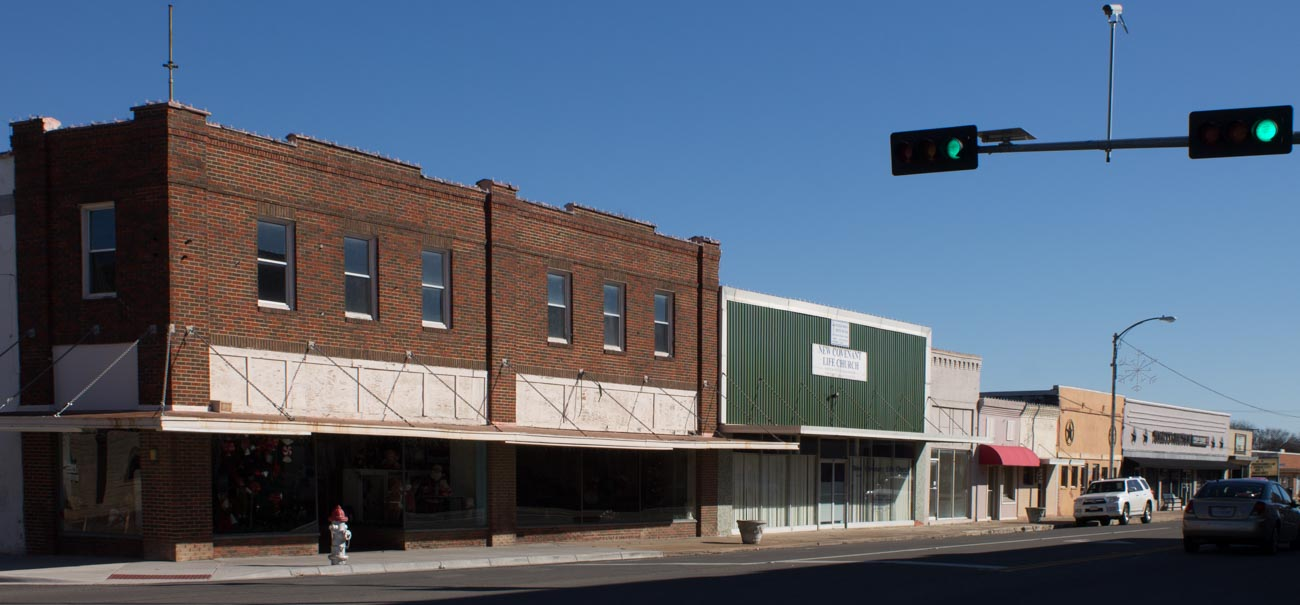
- Downtown McGregor

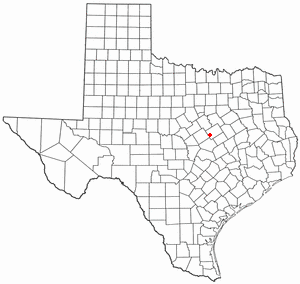
- Location of McGregor, Texas

- Coordinates: 31°25′55″N 97°25′30″W
- Country: United States
- State: Texas
- Counties: McLennan, Coryell

Area
  - Total: 21.79 sq mi (56.44 km^{2})
  - Land: 21.79 sq mi (56.44 km^{2})
  - Water: 0 sq mi (0.00 km^{2})
- Elevation: 758 ft (231 m)

Population (2020)
  - Total: 5,321
  - Estimate (2025): 6,405
  - Density: 245.0/sq mi (94.58/km^{2})
- Time zone: UTC-6 (Central (CST))
  - Summer (DST): UTC-5 (CDT)
- ZIP code: 76657
- Area code: 254
- FIPS code: 48-45672
- GNIS feature ID: 2411063
- Website: cityofmcgregor.com

McGregor is a city in McLennan and Coryell Counties in the U.S. state of Texas. Its population was 5,321 at the 2020 census.

McGregor lies in two counties and two metropolitan areas. The McLennan County portion of the city is part of the Waco metropolitan area, while the small portion that lies in Coryell County is part of the Killeen-Temple-Fort Hood metropolitan area.

== Geography ==
McGregor is located in western McLennan County and extends westward into Coryell County, surrounding McGregor Industrial Park, a former Naval Weapons Reserve Plant.

U.S. Route 84 passes through the city center, leading northeast 17 miles (27 km) to Waco and west 20 miles (32 km) to Gatesville. Texas State Highway 317 crosses US 84 near the city center, leading north 15 miles (24 km) to Valley Mills and south 28 miles (45 km) to Belton.

According to the United States Census Bureau, McGregor has a total area of 21.8 square miles (56.4 km^{2}), all land.

=== Climate ===
The climate in this area is characterized by hot, humid summers and generally mild to cool winters. According to the Köppen climate classification, McGregor has a humid subtropical climate, Cfa on climate maps.

== Demographics ==
Historical population
Census	Pop.	Note	%±
1890	774		—
1900	1,435		85.4%
1910	1,864		29.9%
1920	2,081		11.6%
1930	2,041		−1.9%
1940	2,062		1.0%
1950	2,669		29.4%
1960	4,642		73.9%
1970	4,365		−6.0%
1980	4,513		3.4%
1990	4,683		3.8%
2000	4,727		0.9%
2010	4,987		5.5%
2020	5,321		6.7%
2025 (est.)	6,405		20.4%
U.S. Decennial Census

=== 2020 census ===
As of the 2020 census, 5,321 people, 1,873 households, and 1,118 families were residing in the city.

The median age was 34.5 years; 28.7% of the residents were under 18 and 15.9% were 65 or older. For every 100 females, there were 101.9 males, and for every 100 females 18 and over. there were 96.2 males age 18 and over.

Almost all of the residents lived in urban areas, while 3.6% lived in rural areas.

Of the 1,873 households in McGregor, 42.2% had children under 18 living in them, 46.7% were married-couple households, 16.4% were households with a male householder and no spouse or partner present, and 29.1% were households with a female householder and no spouse or partner present. About 23.9% of all households were made up of individuals, and 12.7% had someone living alone who was 65 or older.

The city had 2,034 housing units, of which 7.9% were vacant. The homeowner vacancy rate was 2.4% and the rental vacancy rate was 7.2%.

Racial composition as of the 2020 census
Race	Number	Percentage
White	2,851	53.6%
Black or African American	415	7.8%
American Indian and Alaska Native	105	2.0%
Asian	23	0.4%
Native Hawaiian and other Pacific Islander	4	0.1%
Some other race	1,024	19.2%
Two or more races	899	16.9%
Hispanic or Latino (of any race)	2,205	41.4%

McGregor racial composition (NH = Non-Hispanic) (Note: Note: the US Census treats Hispanic/Latino as an ethnic category. This table excludes Latinos from the racial categories and assigns them to a separate category. Hispanics/Latinos can be of any race.)
Race	Number	Percentage
White (NH)	2,459	46.21%
Black or African American (NH)	402	7.55%
Native American or Alaska Native (NH)	19	0.36%
Asian (NH)	21	0.39%
Pacific Islander (NH)	4	0.08%
Some Other Race (NH)	20	0.38%
Multiracial (NH)	191	3.59%
Hispanic or Latino	2,205	41.44%
Total	5,321	

=== 2000 census ===
As of the 2000 census, 4,727 people, 1,728 households, and 1,206 families resided in the city. The population density was 216.7 inhabitants per square mile (83.7/km^{2}). The 1,856 housing units had an average density of 85.1 per square mile (32.9/km^{2}). The racial makeup of the city was 71.10% White, 11.53% African American, 1.02% Native American, 0.38% Asian, 14.41% from other races, and 1.57% from two or more races. Hispanics or Latinos of any race were 27.27% of the population.

Of the 1,728 households, 33.1% had children under 18 living with them, 51.4% were married couples living together, 13.4% had a female householder with no husband present, and 30.2% were not families. About 27.7% of all households were made up of individuals, and 15.2% had someone living alone who was 65 or older. The average household size was 2.63, and the average family size was 3.21.

In the city, the population was distributed as 27.7% under 18, 9.1% from 18 to 24, 25.4% from 25 to 44, 18.6% from 45 to 64, and 19.3% who were 65 or older. The median age was 36 years. For every 100 females, there were 85.6 males. For every 100 females 18 and over, there were 81.1 males.

The median income in the city for a household was $33,200 and for a family was $37,143. Males had a median income of $31,250 versus $18,605 for females. The per capita income for the city was $16,311. About 10.9% of families and 14.9% of the population were below the poverty line, including 19.1% of those under 18 and 16.3% of those 65 or over.

== Economy ==
McGregor is the site of the former Bluebonnet Ordnance Plant, which made munitions during World War II. After the war, the site has been used by a number of companies to make rockets, including Phillips Petroleum Company, Rocketdyne, Hercules Inc., and Beal Aerospace. SpaceX has a rocket engine-development and test facility in McGregor that it acquired from defunct Beal Aerospace. In May 2016, McGregor passed an ordinance to reduce noise and vibration caused by SpaceX testing activity.

In 2021, Knauf Insulation announced its intention to establish a facility for the manufacture and distribution of fiberglass insulation products. Construction began in May 2022, and the plant was expected to start production in 2024.

McGregor is the home of Magnolia House, a Victorian property renovated in season three of HGTV's Fixer Upper by Chip and Joanna Gaines. It now operates as a bed and breakfast.

== Education ==
The city is served by the McGregor Independent School District and the Midway Independent School District

== Transportation ==
- McGregor Station
