= XS-1 (spacecraft) =

Experimental spaceplane/booster (2013–2020)

The DARPA XS-1 was an experimental spaceplane/booster with the planned capability to deliver small satellites into orbit for the U.S. Department of Defense. It was reported to be designed to be reusable as frequently as once a day, with a stated goal of doing so for 10 days straight. The XS-1 was intended to directly replace the first stage of a multistage rocket by taking off vertically and flying to hypersonic speed and high suborbital altitude, enabling one or more expendable upper stages to separate and deploy a payload into low Earth orbit. The XS-1 would then return to Earth, where it could ostensibly be serviced fast enough to repeat the process at least once every 24 hours.

The DARPA XS-1 program operated 2013–2020. After several years of refinement and proposals, in May 2017, the Defense Advanced Research Projects Agency (DARPA) selected Boeing for Phase 2/3 to build and test an XS-1 spacecraft (now called the Experimental Spaceplane program). At the time, test flights were scheduled to start no earlier than 2020. On 22 January 2020, it was announced that Boeing was ceasing its role in the program, effectively ending it.

== History ==
DARPA created the XS-1 program (later renamed to the Experimental Spaceplane Program), with the intent to increase national security by inventing a new, inexpensive, short-notice form of hypersonic aircraft. They promoted concepts such as reaching a Low Earth orbit within days, unmanned reusable rockets, external boosters being replaced by internal, self-contained cryogenic propelled boosters, the ability to deploy 900 to 3,000 lb (410 to 1,400 kg) payloads into polar orbit, composite-metallic wings that could withstand suborbital hypersonic flight and temperatures exceeding 3,000 °F (1,600 °C), autonomous flight technology developed by DARPA's Airborne Launch Assist Space Access (ALASA) program, and reaching Mach 10.

The XS-1 program followed several previous failed attempts to develop a reusable space launch vehicle. The Rockwell X-30 in the 1980s and X-33 VentureStar in the 1990s never flew because of immature technologies. DARPA's last attempt was the Responsive Access, Small Cargo, Affordable Launch (RASCAL) program in the early 2000s with the goal of placing 300 lb (140 kg) payloads in orbit for less than $750,000.

The XS-1 program was announced in November 2013 at a DARPA industry day. DARPA stated that the XS-1 was more feasible due to better technologies, including light and low-cost composite airframe and tank structures, durable thermal protection, reusable and affordable propulsion, and aircraft-like health management systems. Jess Sponable, the XS-1 program manager, spoke on February 5, 2014, at NASA's Future In-Space Operations group, stating, "The vision here is to break the cycle of escalating space system costs, enable routine space access and hypersonic vehicles."

By July 2014, three companies were awarded contracts to design a demonstration vehicle. The selected companies were Boeing with Blue Origin, Masten Space Systems with XCOR Aerospace, and Northrop Grumman with Virgin Galactic. Unlike other DARPA programs that were handed off to parts of the United States military once proven successful, this initiative was designed from the start to be a direct partnership between the agency and industry. In August 2015, Boeing, Northrop Grumman, and Masten Space Systems all received additional funding from DARPA to continue their design concepts for Phase 1B of the program. As of 2015, the first XS-1 orbital mission was planned to occur as early as 2020.

DARPA began Phase 2 of the XS-1 program in April 2016. In July 2016, DARPA stated that they believed "the time is right for a renewed effort, one that began in 2013/14, but [in 2016 was] ramped up through a solicitation process, allowing for several industry concepts to be created. Per the [solicitation] requirements, the winged craft [requirements would continue to need to] be capable of performing 10 flights in 10 days, with a payload capacity greater than 3,000 lbs for a cost of less than $5 million USD per flight."

In May 2017, DARPA selected Boeing for Phase 2/3 to build and test the XS-1 (now called the Experimental Spaceplane program). The phase 2/3 contract included $146 million in DARPA funding and an unspecified contribution by the company.

On 22 January 2020, DARPA announced that Boeing was pulling out of the XS-1 program "immediately" and effectively ending the program.

== Program goals ==
The goals of the program as of September 2013 were: The space plane must carry a 3,000–5,000 lb (1,400–2,300 kg) payload to low Earth orbit for less than a cost of US$5 million per flight, at a rate of 10 or more flights per year; at that time, launching that type of payload requires using an Orbital Sciences Corporation Minotaur IV expendable booster, priced at $55 million once per year.

- hypersonic flight to Mach 10 (12,300 km/h) or higher
- fast one-day turnaround time, including flying 10 times in 10 days
- a 1,800 kg (4,000 lb) payload on a trajectory to orbit
- launch cost less than 1/10 that of current launch systems, approximately US$5 million per flight
- uncrewed vehicle
- use a reusable first stage booster to fly at hypersonic speeds to a suborbital altitude, coupled with one or more expendable upper stages that would separate and deploy a satellite

== Entrants and selection ==
Boeing, Northrop Grumman Aerospace Systems, and Masten Space Systems have Phase 1 conceptual design contracts.

Boeing performed trade studies with Blue Origin initially. Boeing's design would allow the autonomous booster to carry the second stage and payload to high altitude and deploy them into space. The booster would then return to Earth, where it could be quickly prepared for the next flight by applying operation and maintenance principles similar to modern aircraft.

Northrop Grumman used its aircraft, spacecraft, and autonomous systems experience to work with its team consisting of Scaled Composites to lead fabrication and assembly, and Virgin Galactic to head commercial spaceplane operations and transition; Virgin Galactic and Scaled Composites both worked on the SpaceShip Two, the world's only commercial spaceline. The team also leveraged technologies developed during related projects for DARPA, NASA, and the U.S. Air Force Research Laboratory to give the government "return on those investments." Their concept included a clean-pad launch using a transporter erector launcher with minimal infrastructure and ground crews, highly autonomous flight operations, and horizontal landing and recovery on standard runways.

Masten Space Systems has experience in rapid reusable rocket-powered vehicles, with their Xombie, Xoie, and Xaero vertical takeoff, vertical landing (VTVL) designs having already met or exceeded the 10 flights in 10 days objective set by the program. Although the company consists of approximately 30 employees and is headquartered in a small building at the Mojave Air and Space Port, they have spent years flying various small VTVL systems on short hops at the spaceport, serving as test beds for guidance, navigation, and control (GNC) systems designed to safely land spacecraft on the Moon and potentially other planets. Their concept showed a VTVL system taking off vertically from a launch pad with wings and a tail fin. Masten Space Systems was partnered with XCOR Aerospace for Phase 1A.

Phase 2 & 3

In May 2017 Boeing was selected to partner with DARPA to build the XS-1. Aerojet Rocketdyne was to provide AR-22 engines, derived from the RS-25 engine, for the spacecraft. The phase 2/3 contract to build and fly the prototype included US$146 million of DARPA funding.

== Boeing XS-1 Phantom Express ==
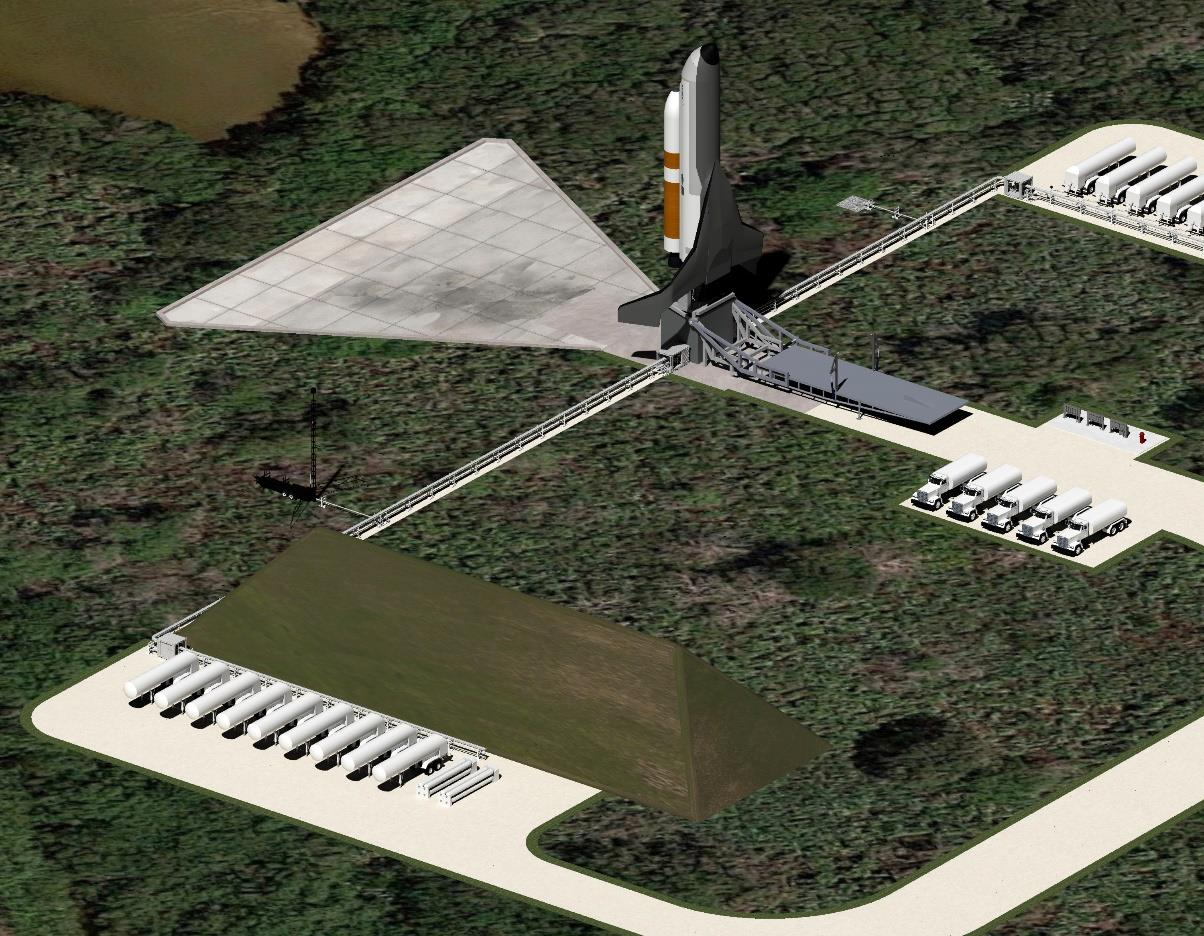
A rendering of Boeing's XS-1 Phantom Express launch vehicle on LC-48

The Boeing design was a vertical takeoff, horizontal landing (VTHL) craft called Phantom Express, intended to increase the nation's access to space. The planned specifications include a vehicle height of 100 feet (30 m), with a 62 foot (19 m) wingspan. The Phantom express was to use an Aerojet Rocketdyne AR-22 engine, which was originally built for the Space Shuttle program, but has been modified to be reused ten times within ten days, for less than $5 million per launch. It was intended to loft satellites cheaply and rapidly, with reusability further lowering the cost per launch. This performance requirement was demonstrated on a test stand in July 2018. On 22 January 2020, it was announced that Boeing's Phantom Works division was ceasing its role in the program. Boeing representatives stated that their investments into the XS-1 project would be redirected to other Boeing projects that relate to air, sea, and space domains. DARPA sought no refunds, as Boeing received payment with accordance to milestones achieved in development. The program was not entirely unfruitful, as the work done proved that the technologies available at the time would be able to support new projects similar to the XS-1 program, and no technical barriers were present.

== See also ==
- Airborne Launch Assist Space Access
- Baikal (rocket booster)
- Boeing X-37
- Boeing X-51
- DARPA Falcon Project
- Liquid fly-back booster, 1999-2004 study for Ariane
- NASA X-43
- Reusable Booster System, USAF project 2010 to 2012
- RLV-TD
- Spaceplane
- Single-stage-to-orbit (SSTO)
