= RETALT =

RETALT (RETro Propulsion Assisted Landing Technologies) is a project aiming to investigate in key technologies for retropropulsion reusable launch systems established in March 2019 with funds from the European Union's Horizon 2020 program. It aims to "advance the research and development of key technologies for European vertical-landing launch vehicles."

The reference configurations for the development of the targeted technologies are two types of vertical launch and landing rockets a two-stage-to-orbit and a single-stage to orbit . The partner organisations are DLR, CFS Engineering (Switzerland), Elecnor Deimos (Spain), MT Aerospace (Germany), Almatech (Switzerland) and Amorim Cork Composites (Portugal).

== See also ==
- Adeline (rocket stage)
- Comparison of orbital launchers families
- Liquid fly-back booster, a cancelled DLR project to develop reusable boosters for Ariane 5
- Reusable launch system
- Winged Reusable Sounding rocket (WIRES)
