= Krafft Arnold Ehricke =

German-American rocket scientist and engineer and space colonization advocate

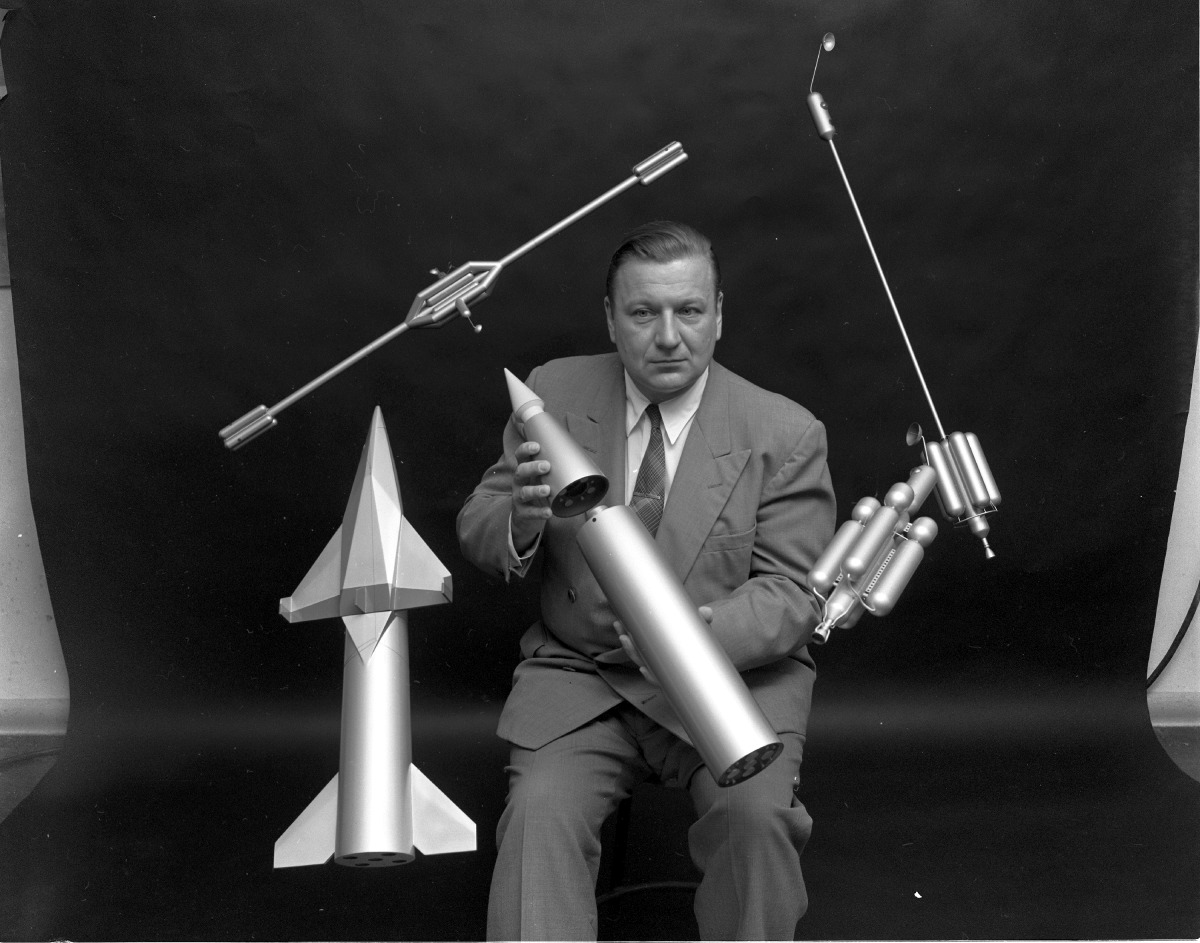
- Ehricke with satellite models, 1957
- Born: March 24, 1917; Berlin, Germany
- Died: December 11, 1984 (aged 67); La Jolla, California, US
- Education: Technische Universität Berlin
- Occupation: Rocket engineer
- Known for: Centaur Upper Stage
- Spouse: Ingeborg Maria Mattull

Krafft Arnold Ehricke (March 24, 1917 – December 11, 1984) was a German-American rocket-propulsion engineer and advocate for space colonization. Ehricke is a co-designer of the first Centaur liquid oxygen/liquid hydrogen upper stage.

== Biography ==
Born in Berlin, Ehricke believed in the feasibility of space travel from a very young age, influenced by his viewing of the 1929 Fritz Lang film Woman in the Moon. At the age of 12, he formed his own rocket society. He attended the Technische Hochschule in Berlin (today Technische Universität Berlin) and studied celestial mechanics and nuclear physics under physicists including Hans Geiger and Werner Heisenberg, attaining his degree in Aeronautical Engineering.

He worked at Peenemünde as a propulsion engineer from 1942 to 1945 with Walter Thiel, then went to the United States with other German rocket scientists and technicians under "Operation Paperclip" in 1947. He worked for a short time with the Von Braun Rocket Team at Huntsville.

In 1948, while working for the U.S. Army, Ehricke wrote a story about a crewed mission to Mars called "Expedition Ares". It anticipated the many challenges that still face explorers who will make the journey in the future. In the same year he wrote a book with Wernher von Braun, The Mars Project, which detailed how man could travel to Mars using a ferry system.

Upon leaving government service in 1952, Ehricke worked at Bell Aircraft, and then moved to Convair in 1954. While at Convair, he designed the D-1 Centaur, the world's first upper-stage-booster that used liquid hydrogen and oxygen. He also created an early space station design, based on launch by Convair's Atlas rocket. The NEXUS reusable rocket was a 1960s concept designed by a group at General Dynamics led by Ehricke. Also, during his stay at General Dynamics, he participated in Project Orion (nuclear propulsion).

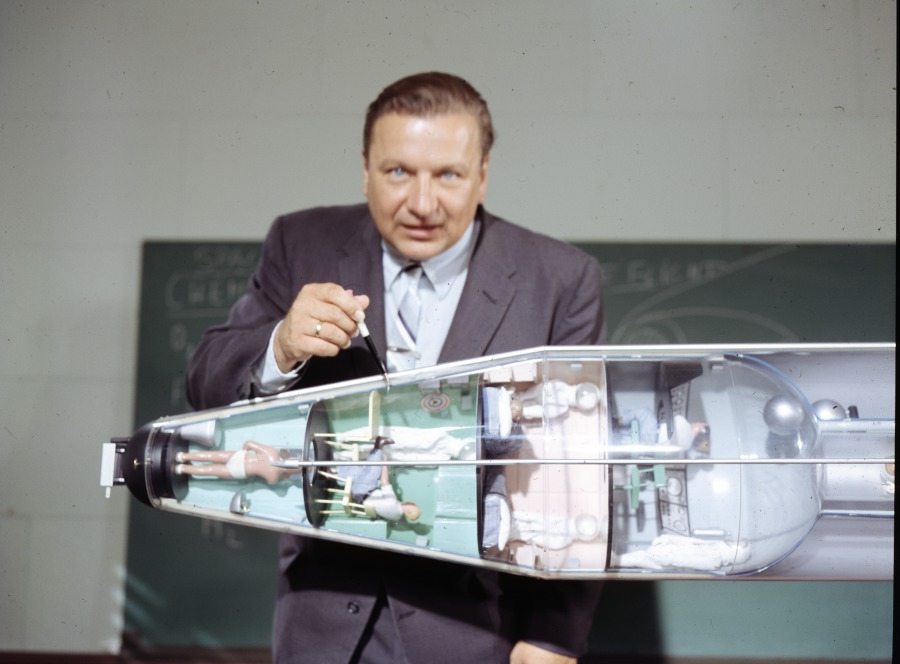
Ehricke with Space Station Model

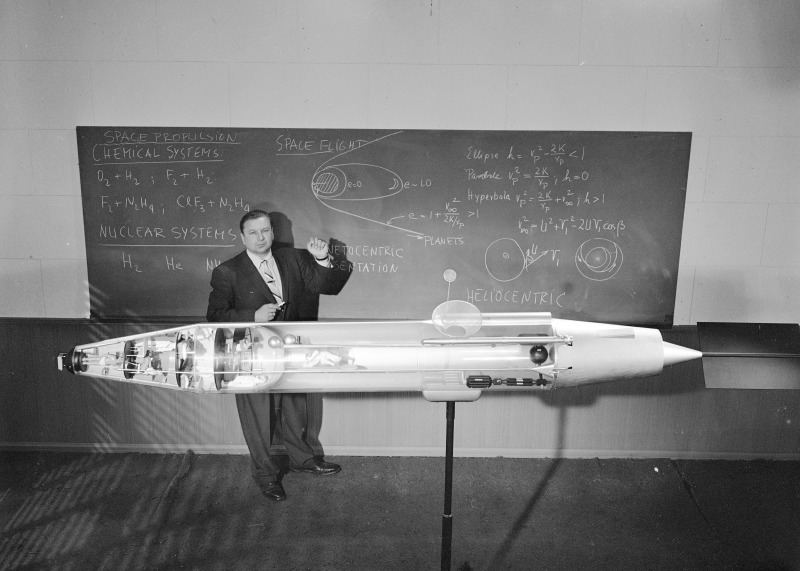
Model Space Station with Kraft Ehricke at Blackboard

In 1966, Ehricke was inducted into the International Aerospace Hall of Fame for his engineering achievements and his influential ideas on the purpose of space exploration.

Ehricke undertook a major, multi-decade study of the industrial development of the Moon, which he described as Earth's "seventh continent." His lunar industrialization concept was based on the most advanced technologies, such as nuclear-powered freight transporters, and using fusion energy to power his city, Selenopolis, on the Moon. Ehricke famously stated in 1984, "If God wanted man to become a spacefaring species, He would have given man a Moon."

He married Ingeborg Ehricke (born 12 September 1922).

Ehricke received a space burial on April 21, 1997, when a rocket sent a small amount of his cremated remains into Earth orbit.

== Contributions to space flight dynamics ==
Ehricke was well known in the field of astrodynamics and its applications; he published two-volume textbook Space Flight in 1959. It focuses on methods for exploration of the Solar System. Although he was not the first, he clearly demonstrated the so-called "gravity assist" method for using hyperbolic encounters with an intermediate planet to increase (or decrease) the velocity and orbital elements of a space vehicle. This technique was essential for the exploration of the Solar System. Examples include the Voyager missions to the outer planets and the recent New Horizons mission to Pluto. His contribution to this important field of exploration has been neglected for many decades and incorrect claims of the "invention" of gravity assist were made by Michael Minovitch.

== Extraterrestrial Imperative ==
Ehricke promoted a philosophical concept called the "Extraterrestrial Imperative." This idea refers to Ehricke's belief that it was the responsibility of humanity to explore space and exploit the resources of the Solar System, in order to sustain the development of the species. There are no external "limits to growth," Ehricke insisted, because while the Earth is a "closed system," the exploration of space opens the universe to humanity. For Ehricke, human creativity has no limits.
