= Reusable launch vehicle =

Vehicles that can go to space and return

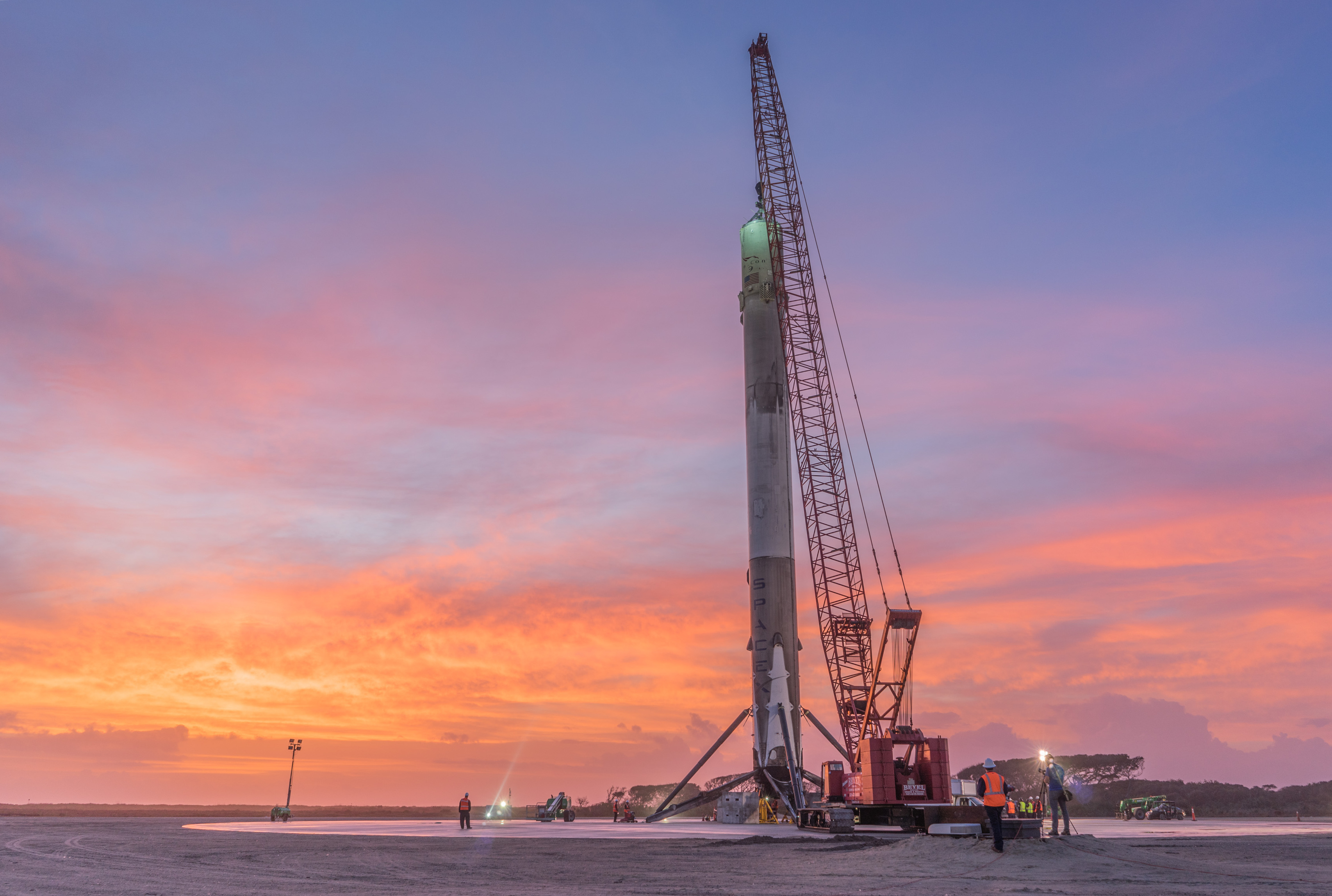
Recovery of Falcon 9 first-stage booster after its first landing

A reusable launch vehicle has parts that can be recovered and reflown, while carrying payloads from the surface to outer space. Rocket stages are the most common launch vehicle parts aimed for reuse. Smaller parts such as fairings, boosters or rocket engines can also be reused, though reusable spacecraft may be launched on top of an expendable launch vehicle. Reusable launch vehicles do not need to make these parts for each launch, therefore reducing its launch cost significantly. However, these benefits can be diminished by the cost of recovery and refurbishment.

Reusable launch vehicles may contain additional avionics and propellant, making them heavier than their expendable counterparts. Reused parts may need to enter the atmosphere and navigate through it, so they are often equipped with heat shields, grid fins, and other flight control surfaces. By modifying their shape, spaceplanes can leverage aviation mechanics to aid in its recovery, such as gliding or lift. In the atmosphere, parachutes or retrorockets may also be needed to slow it down further. Reusable parts may also need specialized recovery facilities such as runways or autonomous spaceport drone ships. Some concepts rely on ground infrastructures such as mass drivers to accelerate the launch vehicle beforehand.

Since at least the early 20th century, single-stage-to-orbit reusable launch vehicles have existed in science fiction. In the 1970s, the first reusable launch vehicle, the Space Shuttle, was developed. However, in the 1990s, due to the program's failure to meet expectations, reusable launch vehicles were reduced to prototype testing. The growth of private spaceflight companies in the 2010s lead to a resurgence of their development, such as in SpaceShipOne, New Shepard, New Glenn, Electron, Falcon 9, and Falcon Heavy. At the same time, the US Boeing X-37 and Chinese CSSHQ military spaceplanes began deploying small satellites. Many launch vehicles are now expected to debut with reusability in the 2020s, such as the US Starship, Neutron, Terran R, Nova, and Eclipse, the Chinese Long March 10 and 12, Tianlong-3, Zhuque-3, Indian NGLV and Agnibaan and the European Ariane Next, Maia and Miura 5.

The impact of reusability in launch vehicles has been momentous for the spaceflight industry. In 2024, the Cape Canaveral Space Force Station initiated a 50-year forward looking plan for the Cape that involved major infrastructure upgrades (including to Port Canaveral) to support a higher anticipated launch cadence and landing sites for the new generation of vehicles.

== Configurations ==
=== Fully reusable launch vehicle ===
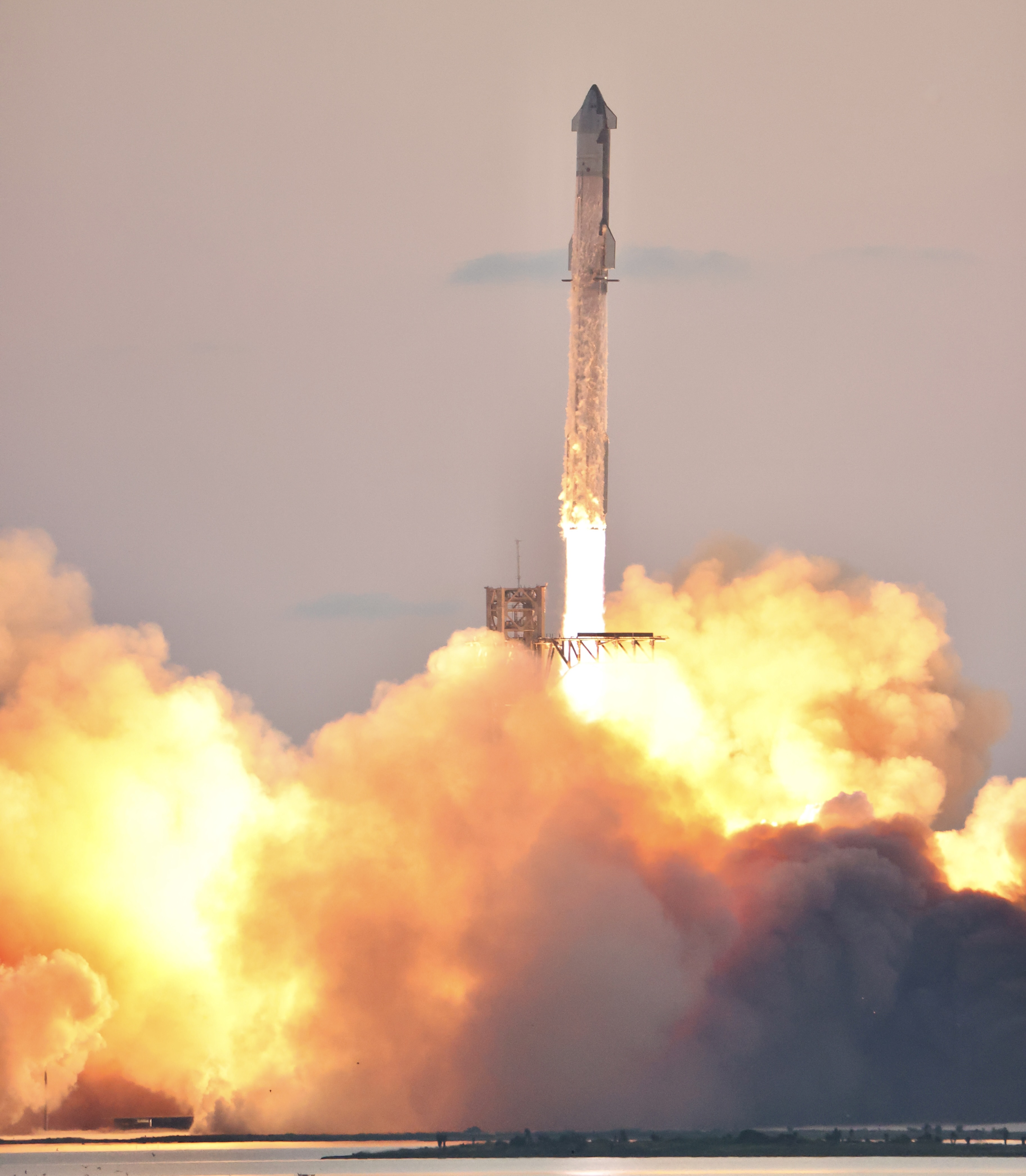
The SpaceX Starship is being built as a fully-reusable super heavy-lift launch vehicle with minimal refurbishment required.

Several companies are currently developing fully reusable launch vehicles as of October 2026. Each of them is working on a two-stage-to-orbit system. SpaceX is testing Starship, which has been in development since 2016 and has made an initial test flight in April 2023 and a total of 14 flights as of October 2026. Stoke Space's Nova Pathfinder and Nova Block 2 vehicles are also planned to be reusable.

As of October 2026, SpaceX's launch vehicle Starship has made significant progress towards full reuse of the entire launch vehicle, both first and second stages. The Super Heavy boosters have demonstrated capability to return to the launch site where they are caught by a "chopstick system" on the launch tower where they can then be reused. The Starship upper stage has completed eight controlled splashdowns in the ocean and was recovered for the first time following its 13th flight. On November 14, 2026, SpaceX successfully caught a Starship upper stage with the launch tower's "chopsticks" arms for the first time, after its return from orbit during Flight 15.

=== Partially reusable launch systems ===
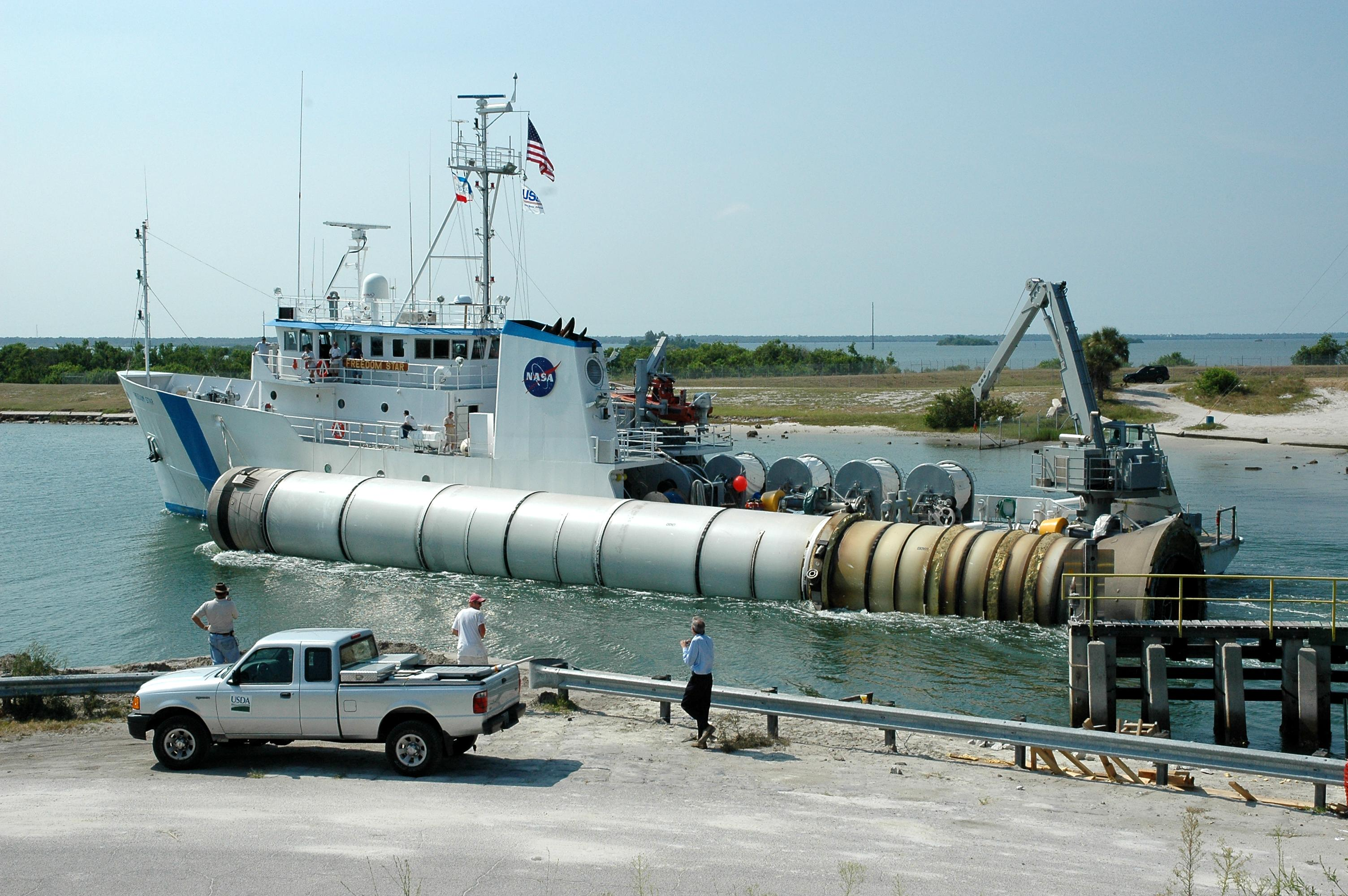
Recovery of a Space Shuttle Solid Rocket Booster for refurbishment.

Partial reusable launch systems, in the form of multiple stage to orbit systems have been so far the only reusable configurations in use. The historic Space Shuttle reused its Solid Rocket Boosters, its RS-25 engines and the Space Shuttle orbiter that acted as an orbital insertion stage, but it did not reuse the External Tank that fed the RS-25 engines. This is an example of a reusable launch system which reuses specific components of rockets. ULA's Vulcan Centaur was originally designed to reuse the first stage engines, while the tank is expended. The engines would splashdown on an inflatable aeroshell, then be recovered. On 23 February 2024, one of the nine Merlin engines powering a Falcon 9 launched for the 22nd time, making it the most reused liquid fuel engine used in an operational manner, having already surpassed Space Shuttle Main Engine number 2019's record of 19 flights. As of 2026, Falcon 9, Falcon Heavy and New Glenn are the only orbital rockets to reuse their boosters, although multiple other systems are in development. All aircraft-launched rockets reuse the aircraft.

Other than that, a range of non-rocket liftoff systems have been proposed and explored over time as reusable systems for liftoff, from balloons to space elevators. Existing examples are systems which employ winged horizontal jet-engine powered liftoff. Such aircraft can air launch expendable rockets and can because of that be considered partially reusable systems if the aircraft is thought of as the first stage of the launch vehicle. An example of this configuration is the Orbital Sciences Pegasus. For suborbital flight the SpaceShipTwo uses for liftoff a carrier plane, its mothership the Scaled Composites White Knight Two. Rocket Lab is working on Neutron, and the European Space Agency is working on Themis. Both vehicles are planned to recover the first stage.

So far, most launch systems achieve orbital insertion with at least partially expended multistaged rockets, particularly with the second and third stages. Only the Space Shuttle has achieved a reuse of the orbital insertion stage, by using the engines and fuel tank of its orbiter. The Buran spaceplane and Starship spacecraft are two other reusable spacecraft that were designed to be able to act as orbital insertion stages and have been produced, however the former only made one uncrewed test flight before the project was cancelled, and the latter has not yet demonstrated upper stage reuse.

=== Reusable spacecraft ===
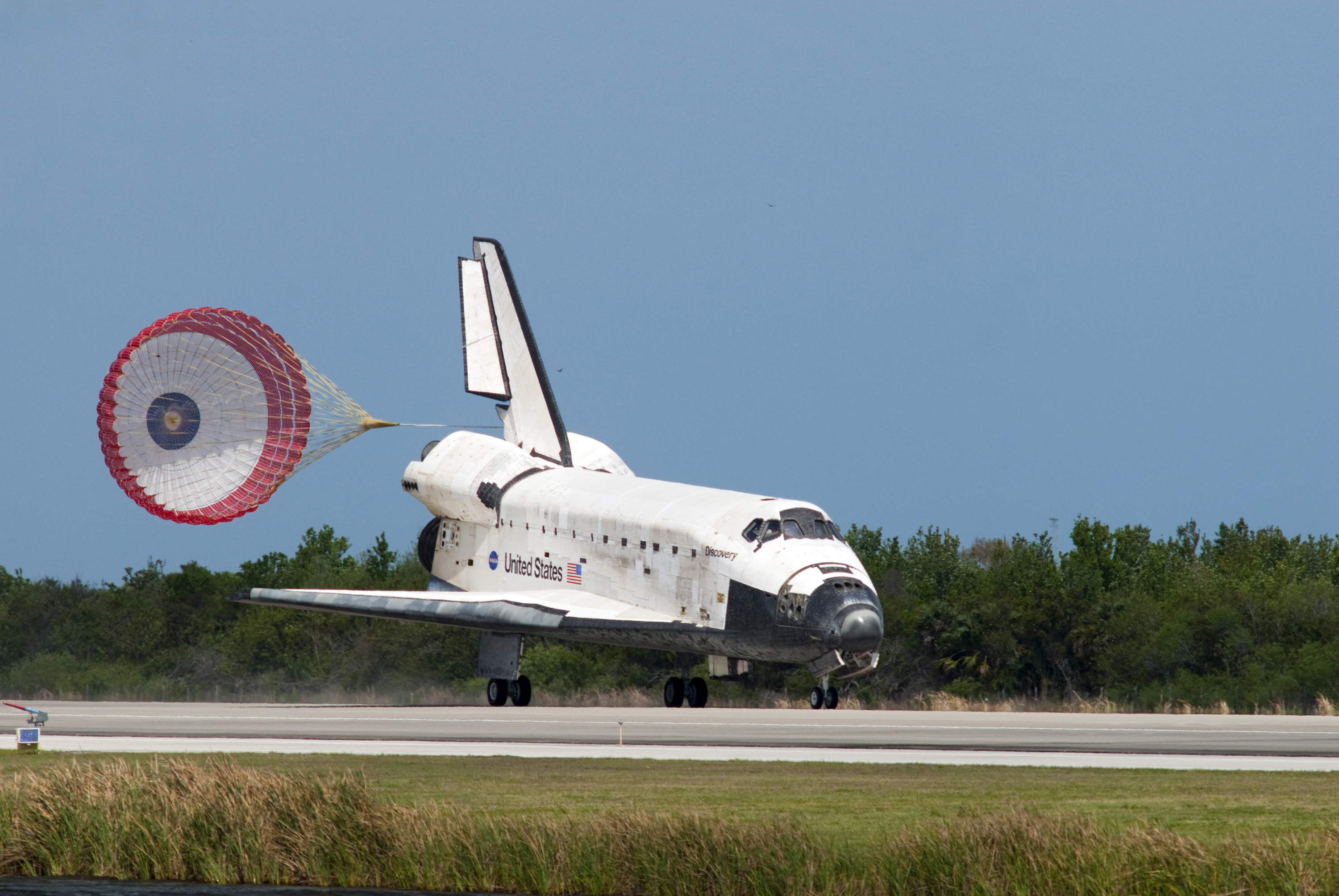
The Space Shuttle orbiters were once prominent examples of reusable spacecraft.

Launch systems can be combined with reusable spaceplanes or capsules. The Space Shuttle orbiter, SpaceShipTwo, Dawn Mk-II Aurora, and the under-development Indian RLV-TD are examples for a reusable space vehicle (a spaceplane) as well as a part of its launch system. Contemporary reusable orbital vehicles include the X-37, Dragon 2, and the upcoming Dream Chaser, Indian RLV-TD and the upcoming European Space Rider (successor to the IXV).

As with launch vehicles, all pure spacecraft during the early decades of human capacity to achieve spaceflight were designed to be single-use items. This was true both for satellites and space probes intended to be left in space for a long time, as well as any object designed to return to Earth such as human-carrying space capsules or the sample return canisters of space matter collection missions like Stardust (1999–2006) or Hayabusa (2005–2010). Exceptions to the general rule for space vehicles were the US Gemini SC-2, the Soviet Union spacecraft Vozvraschaemyi Apparat (VA), the US Space Shuttle orbiter (mid-1970s-2011, with 135 flights between 1981 and 2011) and the Soviet Buran (1980–1988, with just one uncrewed test flight in 1988). Both of these spaceships were also an integral part of the launch system (providing launch acceleration) as well as operating as medium-duration spaceships in space. This began to change in the mid-2010s.

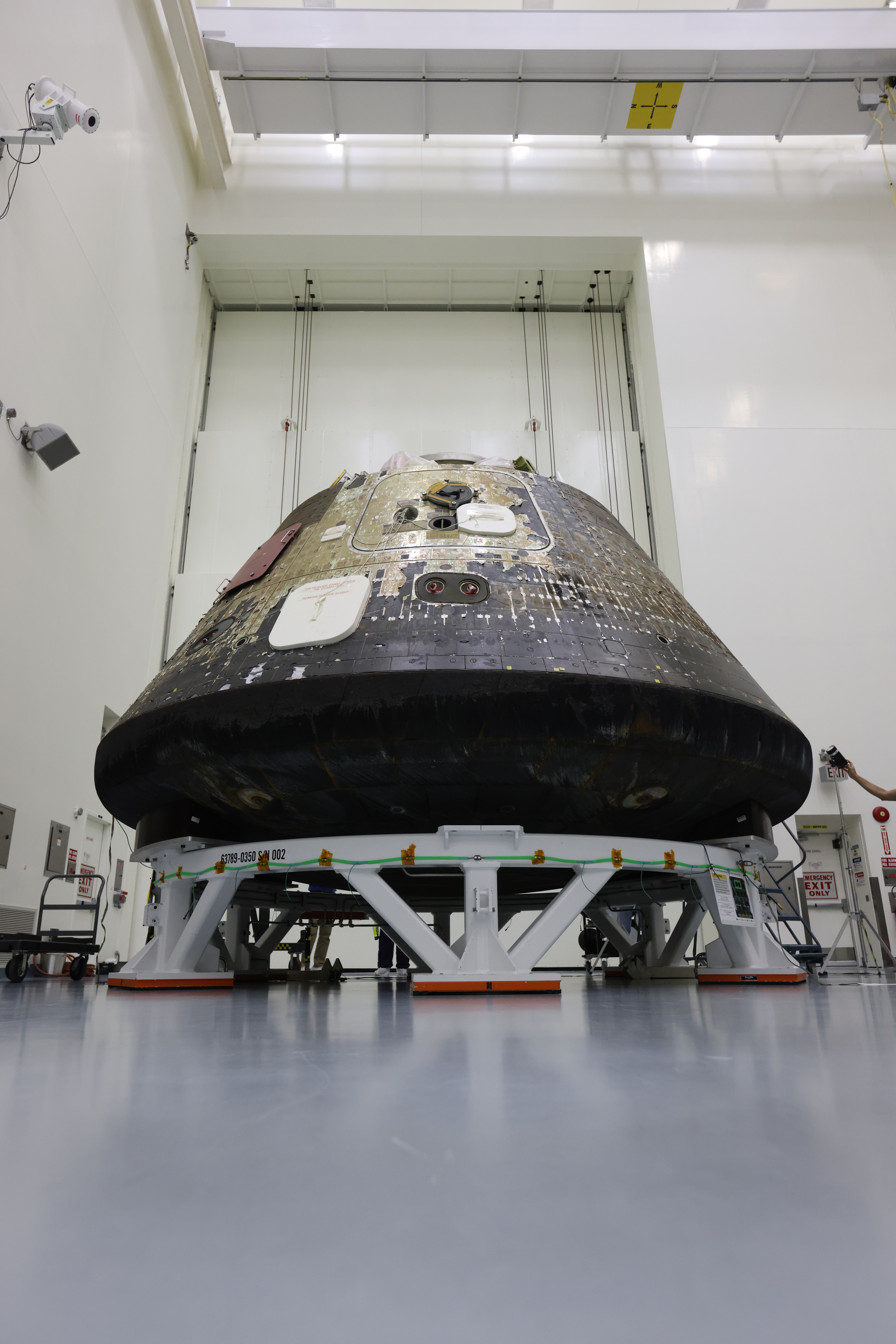
Vehicles like the Orion's Crew Module are featured with thermal protection system, allowing theoretical reusability of the capsules.

In the 2010s, the space transport cargo capsule from one of the suppliers resupplying the International Space Station was designed for reuse, and after 2017, NASA began to allow the reuse of the SpaceX Dragon cargo spacecraft on these NASA-contracted transport routes. This was the beginning of design and operation of a reusable space vehicle. The Boeing Starliner capsules also reduce their fall speed with parachutes and deploy an airbag shortly before touchdown on the ground, in order to retrieve and reuse the vehicle. As of 2026, SpaceX is building and testing the Starship spaceship to be capable of surviving multiple hypersonic reentries through the atmosphere so that they become truly reusable long-duration spaceships. Starship's first orbital and operational flight, flight 14, occurred on the 28th of September 2026, deploying 26 Starlink V3 satellites into LEO.

== Entry systems ==
=== Heat shield ===
With possible inflatable heat shields, as developed by the US (Low Earth Orbit Flight Test Inflatable Decelerator - LOFTID) and China, single-use rockets like the Space Launch System are considered to be retrofitted with such heat shields to salvage the expensive engines, possibly reducing the costs of launches significantly. Heat shields allow an orbiting spacecraft to land safely without expending very much fuel. They need not take the form of inflatable heat shields, they may simply take the form of heat-resistant tiles that prevent heat conduction. Heat shields are also proposed for use in combination with retrograde thrust to allow for full reusability as seen in Starship.

=== Retrograde thrust ===
Reusable launch system stages such as the Falcon 9 and the New Shepard employ retrograde burns for re-entry, and landing.

== Landing systems ==
Reusable systems can come in single or multiple (two or three) stages to orbit configurations. For some or all stages the following landing system types can be employed.

=== Parachutes and airbags ===
These are landing systems that employ parachutes and bolstered hard landings, like in a splashdown at sea or a touchdown at land. The latter may require an engine burn just before landing as parachutes alone cannot slow the craft down enough to prevent injury to astronauts. This can be seen in the Soyuz capsule. Though such systems have been in use since the beginning of astronautics to recover space vehicles, only later have the vehicles been reused.

Examples include:

- Space Shuttle Solid Rocket Boosters
- SpaceX Dragon capsule

=== Horizontal (winged) ===
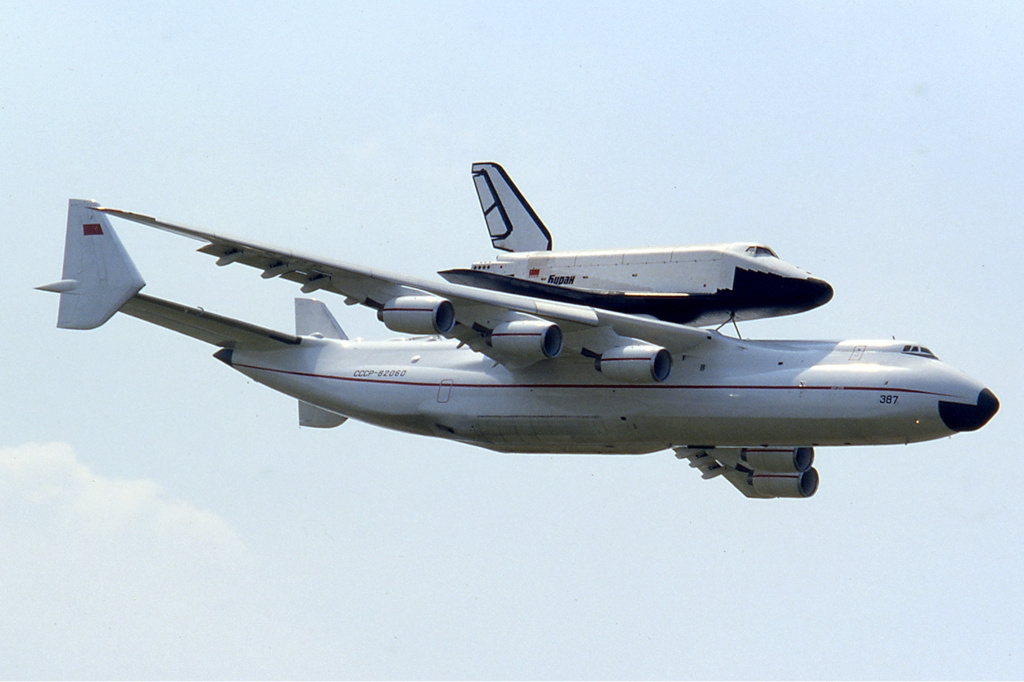
An An-225 carrying the winged Buran on her back.

Single or main stages, as well as fly-back boosters can employ a horizontal landing system. These vehicles land on earth much like a plane does, but they usually do not use propellant during landing. Vehicles that land horizontally on a runway require wings and undercarriage. These typically consume about 9-12% of the landing vehicle mass, which either reduces the payload or increases the size of the vehicle. Concepts such as lifting bodies offer some reduction in wing mass, as does the delta wing shape of the Space Shuttle. A variant is an in-air-capture tow back system, advocated by a company called EMBENTION with its FALCon project.

The following spaceplanes have made successful landings from orbit:

- Space Shuttle orbiter - as part of the main stage
- Buran- acted as an orbital insertion stage, however Polyus could also be used as a second stage for the Energia launch vehicle.
- Boeing X-37 - US military robotic spaceplane since 2010
- Chinese reusable experimental spacecraft - Chinese military robotic spaceplane since 2020

The following spaceplanes have made successful landings from suborbital spaceflights:

- North American X-15 - 1960s US experimental aircraft
- SpaceShipOne - a Mojave Aerospace Ventures aircraft piloted by the first commercial astronaut in 2003
- SpaceShipTwo - a spaceplane for space tourism made by Virgin Galactic
- SpaceShipThree - a spaceplane under development for space tourism made by Virgin Galactic

Non-flown concepts include:

- Venturestar - a project of NASA
- Space Shuttle's studied fly-back booster
- Energia II ("Uragan") - an alternative Buran launch system concept
- OK-GLI - another Buran spacecraft version
- Liquid Fly-back Booster - a German concept
- Baikal - a former Russian project
- Reusable Booster System - a U.S. research project
- Dawn Mk-II Aurora - a spaceplane under development by Dawn Aerospace
- XS-1 - another U.S. research project
- RLV-TD - an ongoing Indian project
- Reaction Engines Skylon SSTO - a former British project

=== Vertical (retrograde) ===
Systems like the McDonnell Douglas DC-X (Delta Clipper) and those by SpaceX are examples of a retrograde system. The boosters of Falcon 9 and Falcon Heavy land using one of their nine engines. The Falcon 9 rocket is the first orbital rocket to vertically land its first stage on the ground. The first stage of Starship is caught by the same arms that raise it to the launch platform after performing most of the typical steps of a retrograde landing. Starship's second stage is also planned to be caught by arms attached to a tower when landing on Earth or to land vertically on the Moon or Mars. Blue Origin's New Shepard suborbital rocket also lands vertically back at the launch site. Retrograde landing typically requires about 10% of the total first stage propellant, reducing the payload that can be carried due to the rocket equation.

As of October 2026, VTVL first-stage recovery of orbital rockets has been achieved by the following:

- SpaceX – Falcon 9 and Falcon Heavy
- Blue Origin – New Glenn
- China Aerospace Science and Technology Corporation – Long March 10B
- LandSpace – Zhuque-3

=== Landing using aerostatic force ===
There is also the concept of a launch vehicle with an inflatable, reusable first stage. The shape of this structure will be supported by excess internal pressure (using light gases). It is assumed that the bulk density of the first stage (without propellant) is less than the bulk density of air. Upon returning from flight, such a first stage remains floating in the air (without touching the surface of the Earth). This will ensure that the first stage is retained for reuse. Increasing the size of the first stage increases aerodynamic losses. This results in a slight decrease in payload. This reduction in payload is compensated for by the reuse of the first stage.

== Constraints ==
=== Extra weight ===
Reusable stages weigh more than equivalent expendable stages. This is unavoidable due to the supplementary systems, landing gear and/or surplus propellant needed to land a stage. The actual mass penalty depends on the vehicle and the return mode chosen.

=== Refurbishment ===
After the launcher lands, it may need to be refurbished to prepare it for its next flight. This process may be lengthy and expensive. While the Space Shuttle was considered invaluable for its unique capabilities, the processes between landing and relaunch were extensive. The launcher may not be able to be recertified as human-rated after refurbishment, although SpaceX has flown reused Falcon 9 boosters for human missions. There is eventually a limit on how many times a launcher can be refurbished before it has to be retired, but how often a launcher can be reused differs significantly between the various launch system designs. As of the 9th of September, 2026, Spacex Falcon 9 booster B1067 has been successfully launched and recovered a record 37 times.

== Return to launch site ==
After 1980, but before the 2010s, two orbital launch vehicles developed the capability to return to the launch site (RTLS). Both the US Space Shuttle—with one of its abort modes—and the Soviet Buran had a designed-in capability to return a part of the launch vehicle to the launch site via the mechanism of horizontal-landing of the spaceplane portion of the launch vehicle. In both cases, the main vehicle thrust structure and the large propellant tank were expendable, as had been the standard procedure for all orbital launch vehicles flown prior to that time. Both were subsequently demonstrated on actual orbital nominal flights, although both also had an abort mode during launch that could conceivably allow the crew to land the spaceplane following an off-nominal launch.

In the 2000s, both SpaceX and Blue Origin have privately developed a set of technologies to support vertical landing of the booster stage of a launch vehicle. After 2010, SpaceX undertook a development program to acquire the ability to bring back and vertically land a part of the Falcon 9 orbital launch vehicle: the first stage. The first successful landing was done in December 2015, since then several additional rocket stages landed either at a landing pad adjacent to the launch site or on an landing platform at sea, some distance away from the launch site. The Falcon Heavy is similarly designed to reuse the three cores comprising its first stage. On its first flight in February 2018, the two outer cores successfully returned to the launch site landing pads while the center core targeted the landing platform at sea but did not successfully land on it.

Blue Origin developed similar technologies for bringing back and landing their suborbital New Shepard, and successfully demonstrated return in 2015, and successfully reused the same booster on a second suborbital flight in January 2016. By October 2016, Blue had reflown, and landed successfully, that same launch vehicle a total of five times. It must however be noted that the launch trajectories of both vehicles are very different, with New Shepard going straight up and down without achieving orbital flight, whereas Falcon 9 has to cancel substantial horizontal velocity and return from a significant distance downrange, while delivering the payload to orbit with the second stage.

Both Blue Origin and SpaceX also have additional reusable launch vehicles under development. Blue is developing the first stage of the orbital New Glenn LV to be reusable, with first flight planned for no earlier than 2024. SpaceX has a new super-heavy launch vehicle under development for missions to interplanetary space. The SpaceX Starship is designed to support RTLS, vertical-landing and full reuse of both the booster stage and the integrated second-stage/large-spacecraft that are designed for use with Starship. Its first launch attempt took place in April 2023; however, both stages were lost during ascent. On the fourth launch attempt however, both the booster and the ship achieved a soft landing in the Gulf of Mexico and the Indian Ocean, respectively.

== History ==
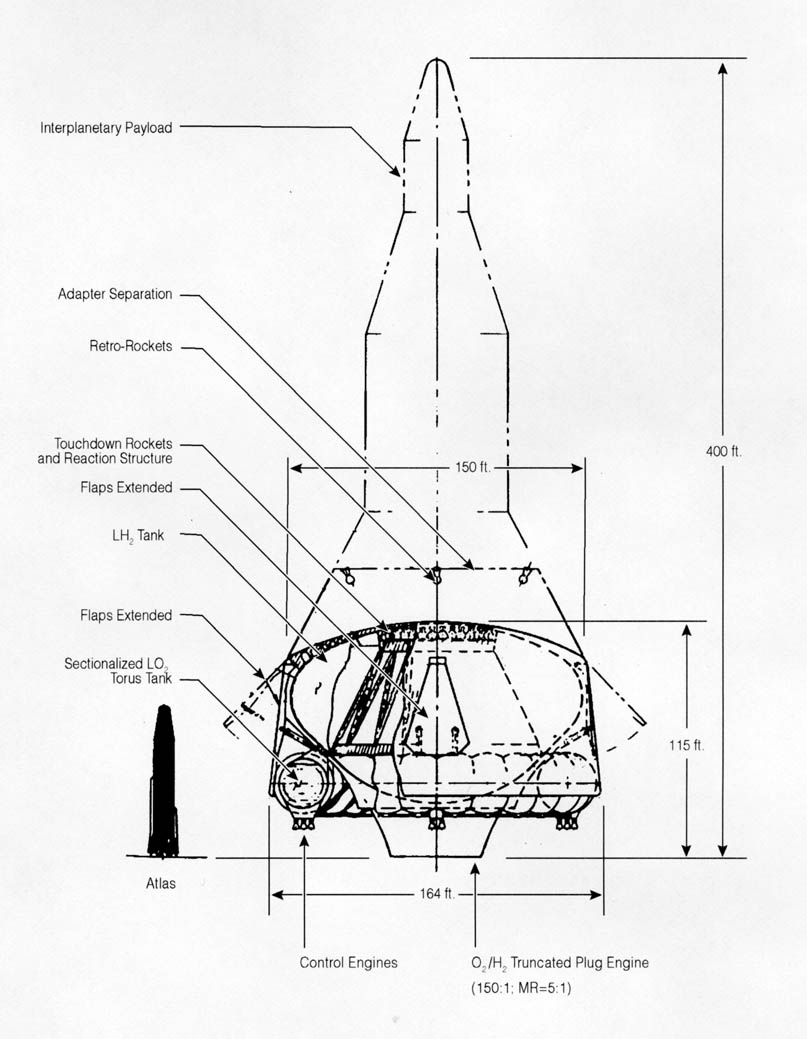
NEXUS concept

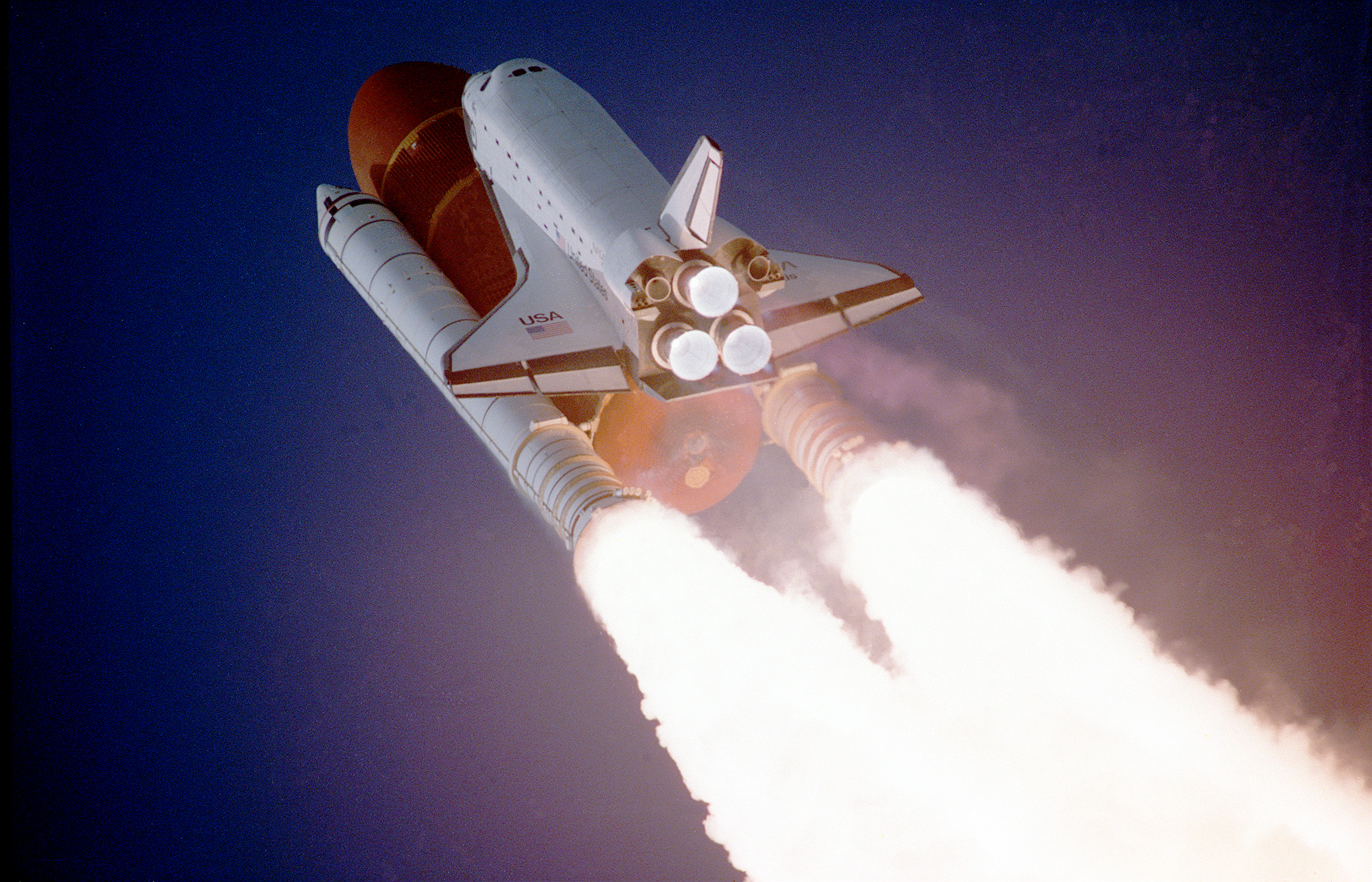
Atlantis taking off on STS-27

With the development of rocket propulsion in the first half of the twentieth century, space travel became a technical possibility. Early ideas of a single-stage reusable spaceplane proved unrealistic and although even the first practical rocket vehicles (V-2) could reach the fringes of space, reusable technology was too heavy. In addition, many early rockets were developed to deliver weapons, making reuse impossible by design. The problem of mass efficiency was overcome by using multiple expendable stages in a vertical launch multistage rocket. USAF and NACA had been studying orbital reusable spaceplanes since 1958, e.g. Dyna-Soar, but the first reusable stages did not fly until the advent of the US Space Shuttle in 1981.

Perhaps the first reusable launch vehicles were the ones conceptualized and studied by Wernher von Braun from 1948 until 1956. The von Braun ferry rocket underwent two revisions: once in 1952 and again in 1956. They would have landed using parachutes.

The General Dynamics Nexus was proposed in the 1960s as a fully reusable successor to the Saturn V rocket, having the capacity of transporting up to 450–910 t (990,000–2,000,000 lb) to orbit. See also Sea Dragon, and Douglas SASSTO.

The BAC Mustard was studied starting in 1964. It would have comprised three identical spaceplanes strapped together and arranged in two stages. During ascent the two outer spaceplanes, which formed the first stage, would detach and glide back individually to earth. It was canceled after the last study of the design in 1967 due to a lack of funds for development.

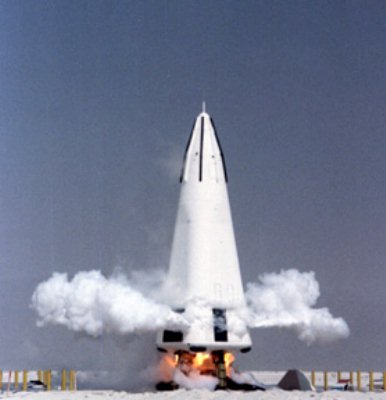
McDonnell Douglas DC-X

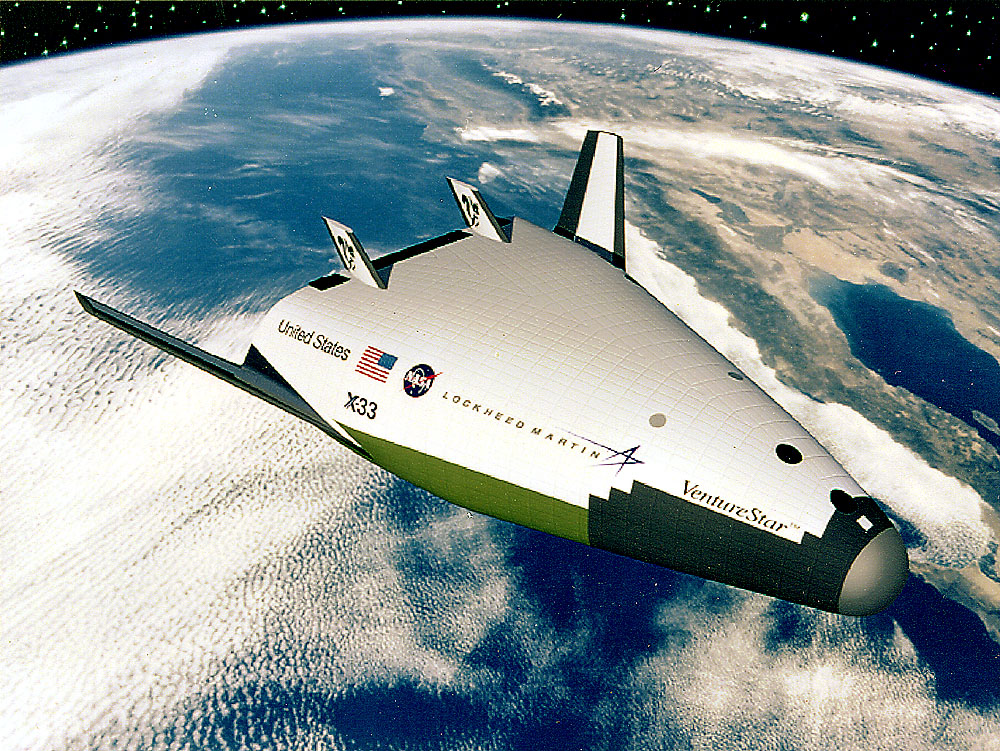
X-33 concept

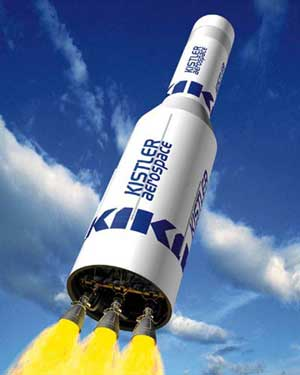
Kistler K-1 concept

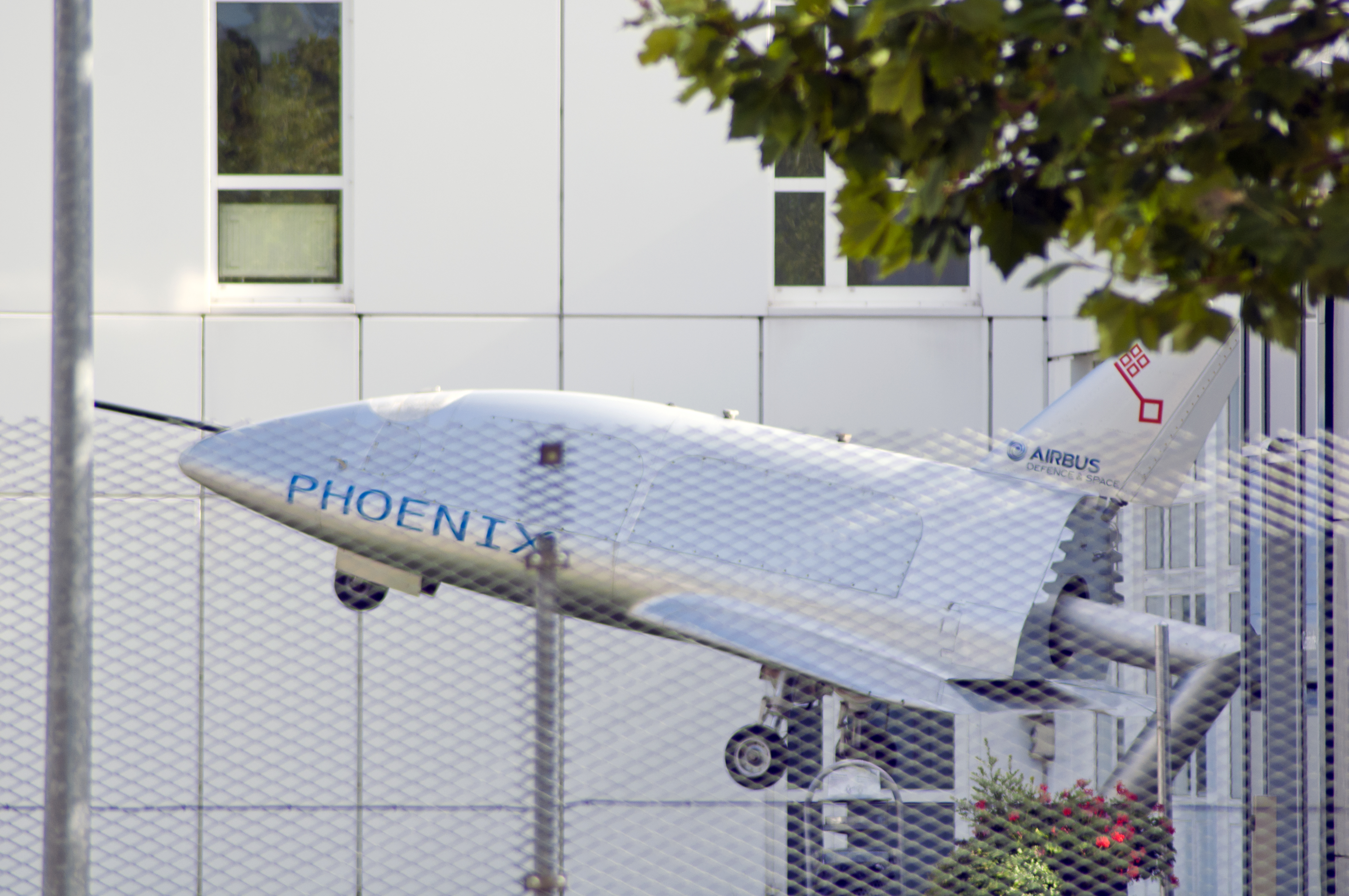
Hopper prototype Phoenix RLV

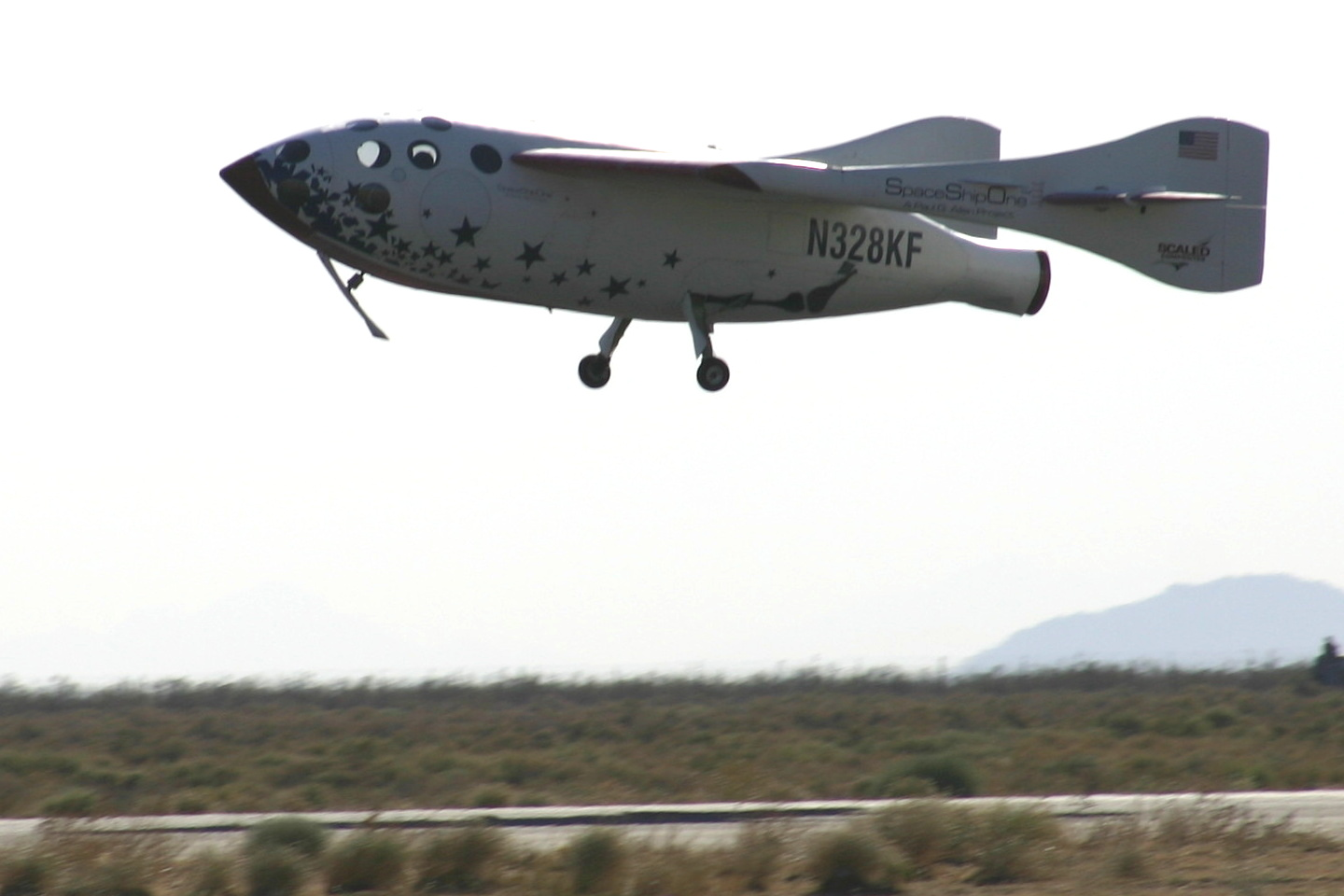
Scaled Composites SpaceShipOne

=== The Space Shuttle era ===
NASA started the Space Shuttle design process in 1968, with the vision of creating a fully reusable spaceplane using a crewed fly-back booster. This concept proved expensive and complex, therefore the design was scaled back to reusable solid rocket boosters and an expendable external tank. Space Shuttle Columbia launched and landed 27 times and was lost with all crew on the 28th landing attempt; Challenger launched and landed 9 times and was lost with all crew on the 10th launch attempt; Discovery launched and landed 39 times; Atlantis launched and landed 33 times; Endeavour launched and landed 25 times. The last mission of Space Shuttle, STS-135, landed back on Earth on 21 July 2011 after delivering supplies and equipment to the International Space Station.

In 1986 President Ronald Reagan called for an air-breathing scramjet National Aerospace Plane (NASP)/X-30. The project failed due to technical issues and was canceled in 1993.

In the late 1980s a fully reusable version of the Soviet Energia rocket, the Energia II, was proposed. Its boosters and core would have had the capability of landing separately on a runway. This concept was not developed and even the original expendable Energia flew only twice in the late 1980s. The second flight launched the reusable spacecraft Buran on its first and only, uncrewed mission.

In the 1990s the McDonnell Douglas Delta Clipper VTOL SSTO proposal progressed to the testing phase. The DC-X prototype demonstrated rapid turnaround time and automatic computer control.

In mid-1990s, British research evolved an earlier HOTOL design into the Skylon design, which remained in development at Reaction Engines until 2024 when the company went bankrupt. In 2025, the European Space Agency (ESA) announced a plan to use technologies developed for Skylon's SABRE engine in its future Flying Engine Testbed initiative INVICTUS.

From the late 1990s to the 2000s, the European Space Agency (ESA) studied the recovery of the Ariane 5 solid rocket boosters. The last recovery attempt took place in 2009.

Two commercial ventures, Kistler Aerospace (later Rocketplane Kistler) and Rotary Rocket, attempted to build reusable privately developed rockets in the 1990s before going bankrupt.

NASA proposed reusable concepts to replace the Shuttle technology, to be demonstrated under the X-33 and X-34 programs, which were both cancelled in the early 2000s due to rising costs and technical issues.

The Ansari X Prize contest, created in 1996, was intended to develop private suborbital reusable vehicles. Many private companies competed, with the winner, Scaled Composites, reaching the Kármán line twice in a two-week period in 2004 with their reusable SpaceShipOne. The design was later developed into the space tourism vehicle SpaceShipTwo, which flew on multiple suborbital flights, but never reached the Kármán line.

Between 1999 and 2004, the German DLR was working on two reusable launch vehicle concepts within the ASTRA (Ausgewählte Systeme und Technologien für Raumtransport) program. The Liquid Fly-back Booster (LFBB) was a winged horizontal landing booster for the Ariane family of rockets. The Hopper spacecraft was a rocket sled-launched spaceplane. In 2004, DLR performed a series of drop tests with Phoenix RLV, a subscale prototype of Hopper, at the North European Aerospace Test range in Kiruna.

In 2001, the Russian Khrunichev space centre proposed a reusable fly-back booster Baikal for the Angara family of rockets. This vehicle never flew. A similar concept was later proposed by Roscosmos in 2018 with no subsequent updates.

In 2005, NASA initiated the Commercial Orbital Transportation Services (COTS) program supporting private companies in developing uncrewed cargo vehicles for resupplying the ISS. This program has briefly resurrected the reusable Kistler K-1 concept by Rocketplane Kistler before it was cancelled for lack of private funding. However, another recipient of COTS funding from NASA, SpaceX, managed to use this support to keep operating and to develop its Falcon 9 rocket, which later became partially reusable.

=== 2010s ===
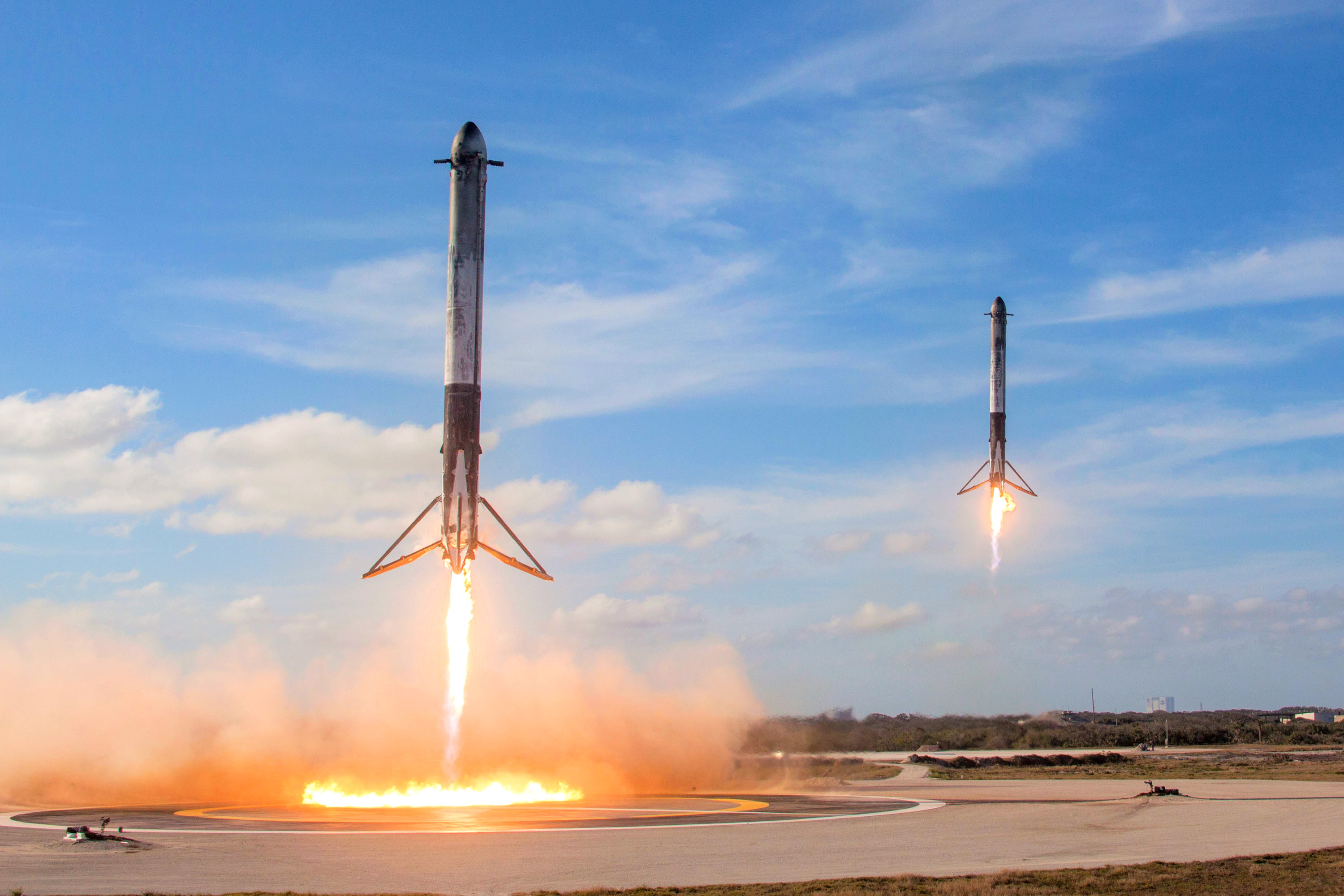
Falcon Heavy side boosters landing during 2018 demonstration mission

Adeline concept

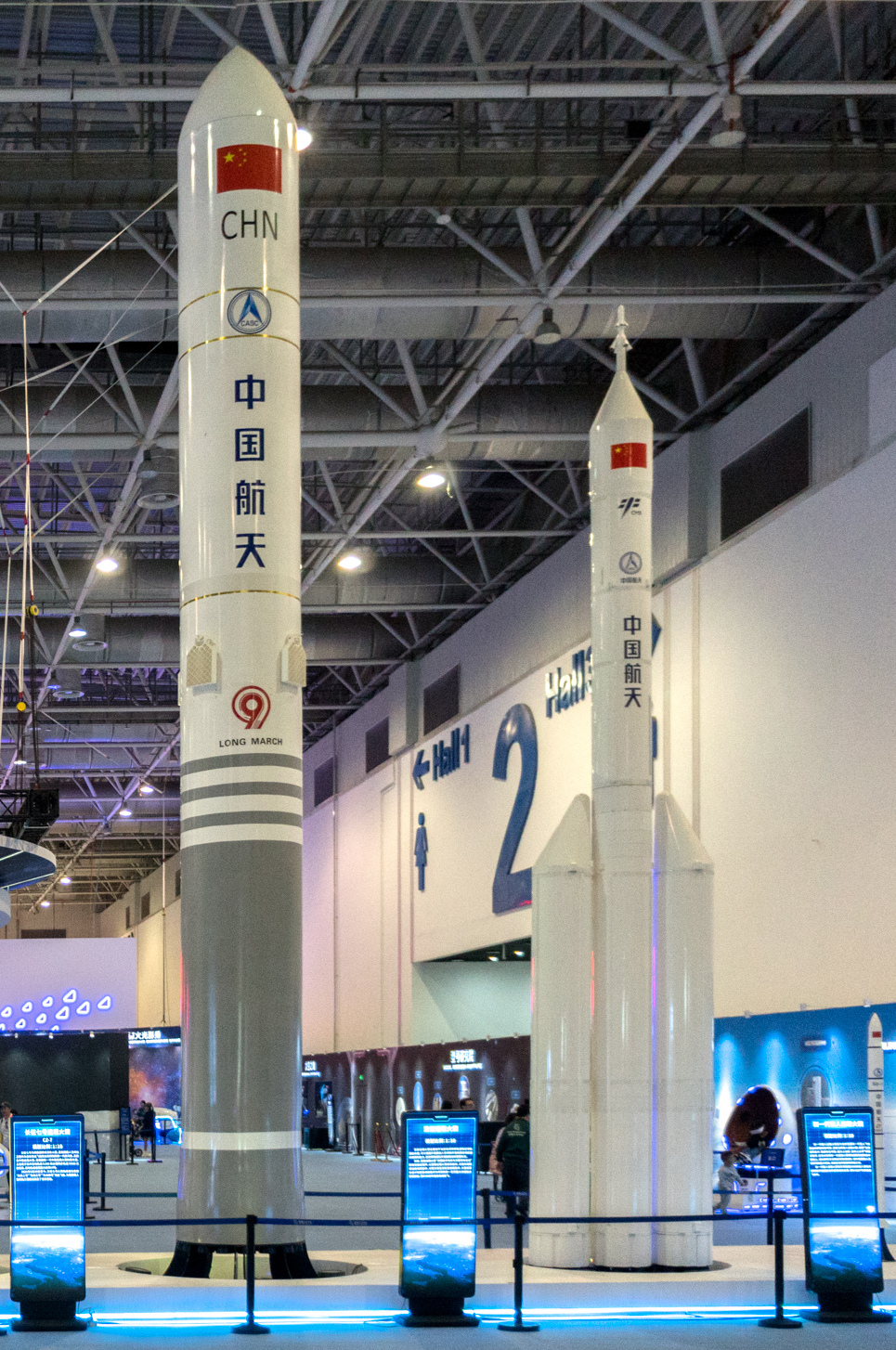
Long March 9 and 10 models

Next Generation Launch Vehicle (NGLV) rocket family

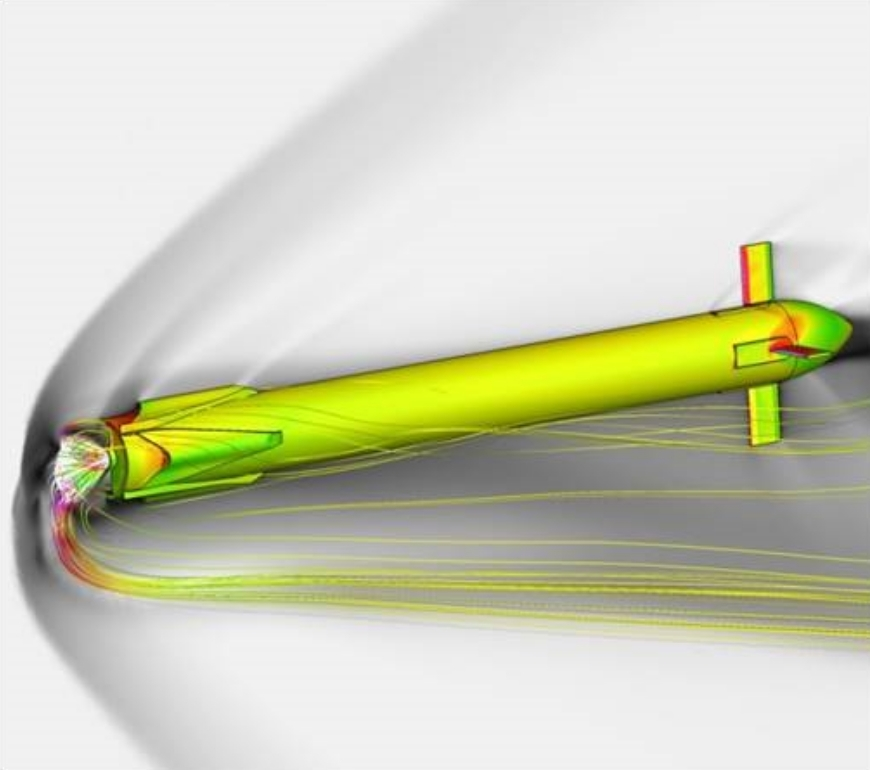
CALLISTO rocket demonstrator by CNES, DLR, and JAXA

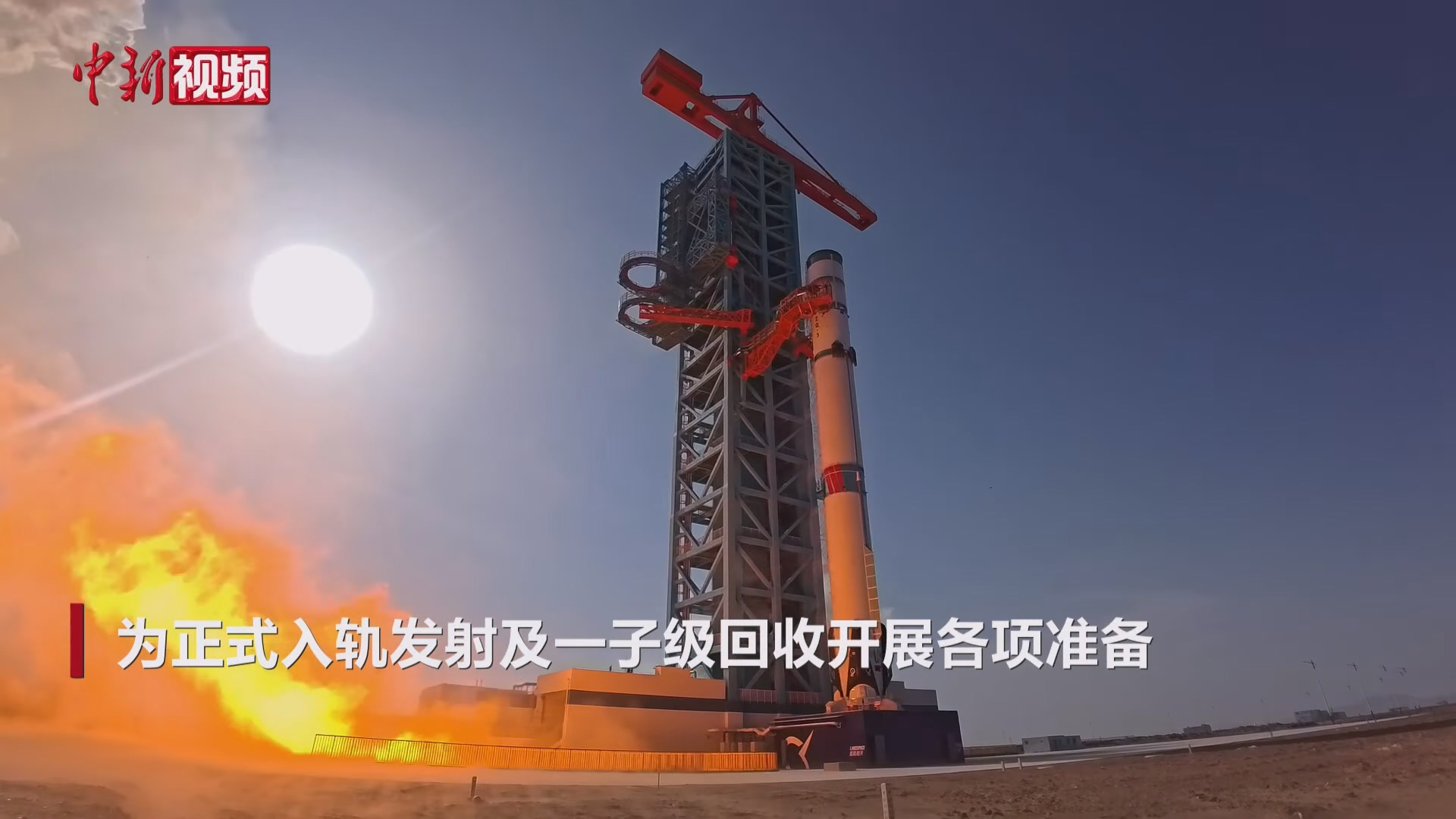
Static firing test of the Zhuque-3

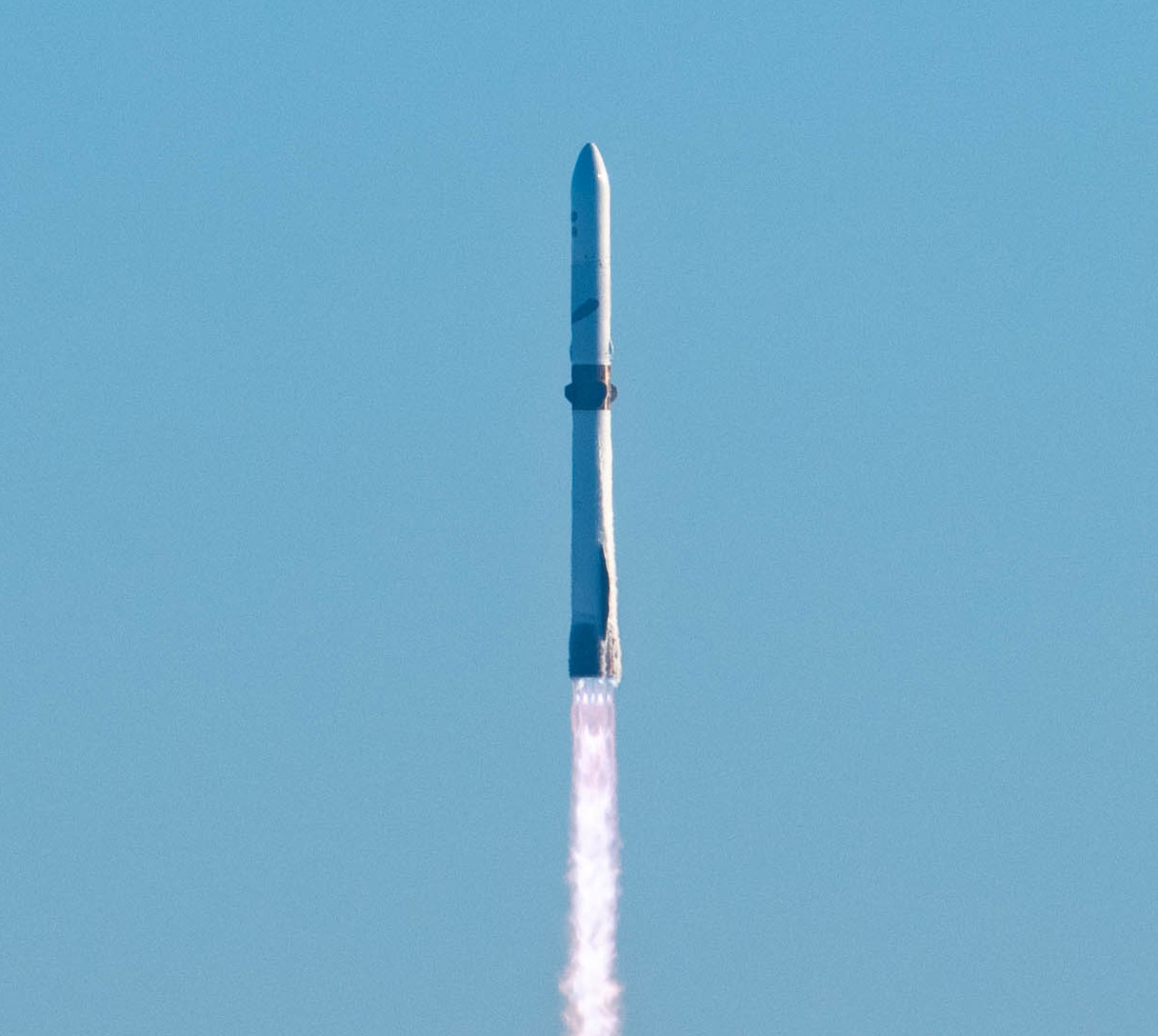
New Glenn second flight, 2025

Reusable Rocket Demonstrators including FD1, Callisto, and Themis

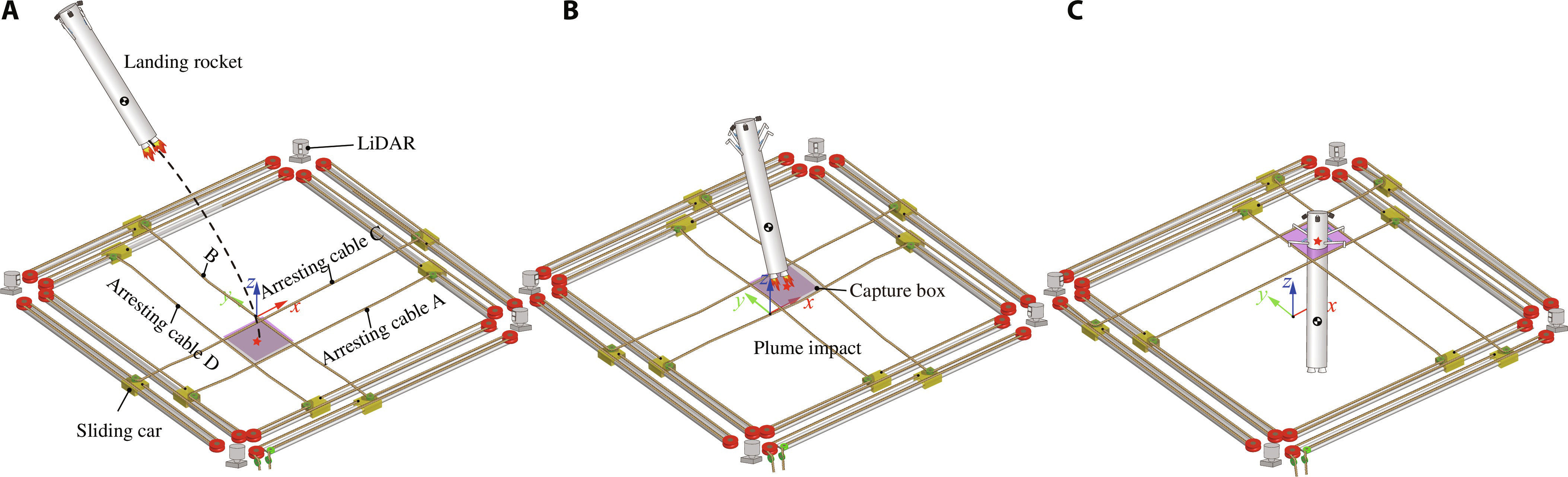
Long March 10B net recovery system

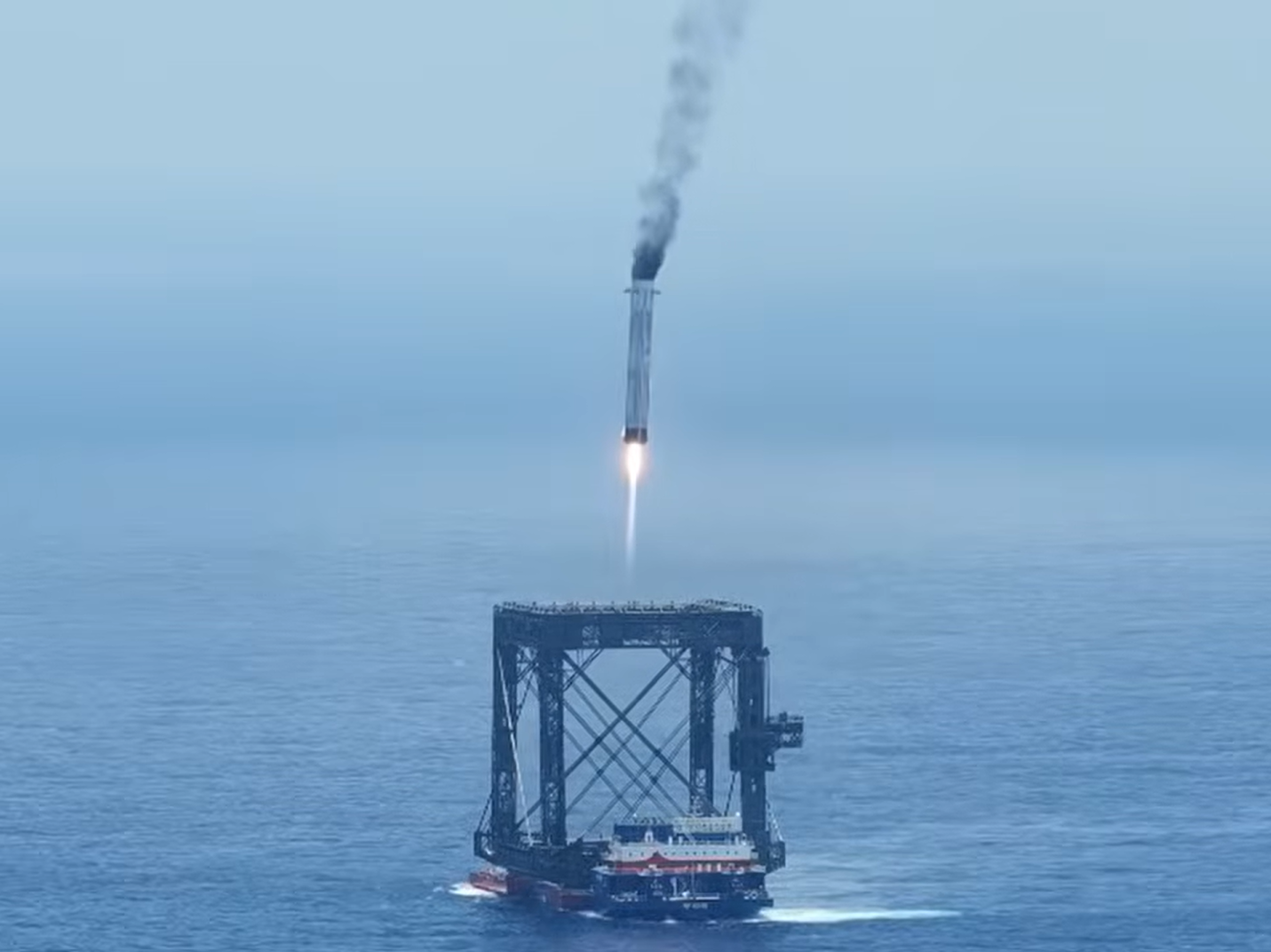
Long March 10B landing

In 2012, SpaceX started a flight test program with experimental vehicles. These subsequently led to the development of the Falcon 9 reusable rocket launcher. SpaceX achieved the first vertical soft landing of a reusable orbital rocket stage on December 21, 2015, after delivering 11 Orbcomm OG-2 commercial satellites into low Earth orbit. The first reuse of a Falcon 9 first stage occurred on 30 March 2017. Since then, SpaceX has been routinely recovering and reusing their first stages, as well as fairings.

In 2015, Airbus Defence and Space proposed the Adeline reusable engine pod for the Ariane family of rockets. In 2018, CNES declared the concept not financially interesting and it hasn't been developed further.

On 23 November 2015 the New Shepard rocket became the first Vertical Take-off, Vertical Landing (VTVL) sub-orbital rocket to reach space by passing the Kármán line (100 km or 62 mi), reaching 329,839 ft (100,535 m) before returning for a propulsive landing.

In November 2016, ESA selected the Spanish Company PLD Space to start developing a reusable first stage under the agency's FLPP program. This project became known as Miura 5 in 2018, when PLD Space redesigned the vehicle to increase its payload capacity after a review by ESA. In April 2019, PLD Space performed a successful drop and recovery test of a Miura 5 first stage demonstrator.

In 2017, the German Aerospace Center (DLR) started working on the Reusable Flight Experiment (ReFEx) aiming to demonstrate a winged fly-back rocket booster. As of 2024, its launch was planned for late 2026 atop a Brazilian VSB-30 sounding rocket from the Koonibba Test Range in Australia.

In 2018, China was researching possible reusability for the Long March 8 system. This had been later abandoned. However, multiple Chinese private companies developing reusable launch vehicles have been performing VTVL test flights of varying complexity and success since 2019.

In March 2019, the German Aerospace Center (DLR) started working on the EU-funded project RETALT aimed at developing retropropulsion technologies for reusable rockets.

In 2019 Rocket Lab announced plans to recover and reuse the first stage of their Electron launch vehicle, intending to use parachutes and mid-air retrieval. On 20 November 2020, Rocket Lab successfully returned an Electron first stage from an orbital launch, the stage softly splashing down in the Pacific Ocean. Nine first stage boosters were recovered between November 2020 and January 2024, however after Rocket Lab re-used certain components from the recovered boosters (including Rutherford rocket engines), the company decided not to re-use Electron first stage boosters, citing decreasing marginal financial savings from the booster recovery program, instead focusing on the larger, partially reusable Neutron rocket.

=== 2020s ===
In 2020, the only operational reusable orbital-class launch systems were the Falcon 9 and Falcon Heavy, the latter of which is based upon the Falcon 9. SpaceX was also developing the fully reusable Starship launch system. Blue Origin was developing its New Glenn orbital rocket with a reusable first stage.

In October 2020, Roscosmos signed a development contract for Amur, a new launcher with a reusable first stage. In 2024, Roscosmos expected the vehicle to fly no earlier than 2030 and announced intention to start developing a prototype first stage in 2025. In 2026, Roscosmos expected the first stage demonstrator to perform its first flights in 2028 and Amur to begin flight tests in 2031.

In December 2020, ESA signed contracts to start developing THEMIS, a prototype reusable first stage. In September 2025, the first THEMIS prototype has been fully assembled at its launch site at Esrange in Sweden. Lessons learned through the development and testing of THEMIS, as well as smaller-scale demonstrators CALLISTO, FROG-T, and FROG-H will be used in development of future European reusable launchers Maia and Ariane Next.

In January 2022, the German Aerospace Center (DLR) initiated the Advanced Technologies for High Energetic Atmospheric Flight of Launcher Stages (ATHEAt) program for demonstrating various technologies related to launch vehicle reusability. The first suborbital test flight of the program successfully launched on 6 October 2025 from Andøya Space in Norway and the second, using a different rocket booster, is scheduled for 2026 from Esrange Space Center in Sweden.

In 2022, China revealed plans to use reusable first stages on the new Long March 9 and 10 rockets, which are expected to serve the country's crewed Lunar program. In August and September 2025, China performed first hot fire tests of Long March 10's first stage, including a restart sequence likely related to first stage landing maneuvres needed for reusability. Long March 10's first stage performed its first soft landing on water on 11 February 2026 during the launch abort test of the Mengzhou spacecraft.

In October 2023, the Spanish company PLD Space, supported by ESA's FLPP funding, tested various technologies for its future reusable launch vehicle Miura 5 by successfully launching the suborbital rocket Miura 1 from the El Arenosillo Test Centre in Huelva, Spain. The company claimed that as much as 70% of the technology needed for Miura 5 could be tested on Miura 1.

In September 2024, the Government of India has approved plans to develop a new partially reusable rocket NGLV. The vehicle, with a VTVL first stage, is expected to be operational around 2033.

In November 2024, China debuted the Long March 12 rocket, whose later version Long March 12A is designed to have a reusable first stage. In January 2025, the Longxing-2 VTVL demonstrator, likely a precursor to Long March 12A's first stage, flew on a high altitude suborbital test flight. The outcome of this test was not made public. Long March 12A had its maiden flight on 23 December 2025. The rocket successfully reached orbit but the first stage was destroyed during its landing attempt.

In 2025, Arianespace proposed making Ariane 6 partially reusable by substituting the rocket's solid-fuel expendable boosters with Liquid Reusable Boosters (LRBs) derived from the Maia rocket under development by Arianespace's subsidiary MaiaSpace. The development of the proposal was funded by ESA's Boosters for European Space Transportation (BEST!) initiative.

In June 2025, the Japanese company Honda performed a successful 300 m high VTVL flight of a liquid-propellant demonstrator rocket equipped with grid fins and landing legs. Another Japanese VTVL demonstrator, JAXA's RV-X vehicle which serves as a technology pathfinder for CALLISTO, flew for the first time in July 2026.

In September 2025, ESA awarded a contract to the Italian company Avio to start developing a reusable upper stage demonstrator. Later in 2025, ESA also awarded a related contract to the Italian company Ingegneria Dei Sistemi (IDS) to design a reusable rocket stage recovery vessel. Meanwhile, Avio has been developing the FD1 and FD2 rocket demonstrators of methalox engines for their future Vega Next rocket, with possible reusability-related features like grid fins.

On 20 October 2025, the Chinese company LandSpace performed a static-fire test of its new rocket Zhuque-3 intended for partial reusability. The first stage of the rocket was equipped with grid fins, aerodynamic chines, and landing legs. The rocket successfully launched and reached orbit on 3 December 2025 but the first stage was destroyed during its landing attempt.

On 13 November 2025, Blue Origin's New Glenn rocket launched NASA's twin ESCAPADE spacecraft to Mars on its second flight. The rocket's first stage then successfully landed on a barge in the Atlantic Ocean. This made Blue Origin the second company after SpaceX to recover an orbital-class booster by a propulsive landing. The same first stage, with a new set of engines, was then successfully reused on 19 April 2026 during the third flight of New Glenn, although the flight's primary mission failed due to a second stage issue.

CZ-10B's maiden launch took place at 4:15 UTC on 10 July 2026 and successfully placed a satellite into its designated orbit. A first stage booster recovery using the LingHangZhe (Navigator) wires-based recovery ship was successful. This makes CZ-10B the fourth launcher system in the world to achieve first-stage recovery during an orbital or sub-orbital launch attempt, after Falcon 9 (2015), Starship (2024), and New Glenn (2025). CZ-10B is the first system in China and the first outside of the United States to accomplish first-stage recovery. It is also the first launcher to succeed at first-stage booster recovery on its very first attempt.

== List of reusable launch vehicles ==
=== Existing ===
reusable launch vehicles (by first flown)
#	Vehicle	Organization	Reusable component(s)	Launched	Recovered	Reflown	Payload to LEO	First Launch	Status
1	Space Shuttle	(United States) NASA	Orbiter	135	133	130	27,500 kg	1981-04-12	Retired (2011)
1	Space Shuttle	(United States) NASA	Side booster	270	266	? (Note: An exact figure for reused SRBs is not possible because the boosters were broken up for parts at the end of recovery and not kept as complete sets of parts.)	27,500 kg	1981-04-12	Retired (2011)
2	Ares I	(United States) NASA	First stage	1	1	0	25,400 kg	2009-10-28	Retired (2010)
3	Falcon 9	(United States) SpaceX	First stage	703	659	620	17,500 kg (reusable); 22,800 kg (expended)	2010-06-04	Active
3	Falcon 9	(United States) SpaceX	Fairing half	>486 (Note: As of 12 January 2024. A presentation slide at the company's all-hands meeting stated that fairing halves of the Falcon 9 and Heavy rockets had been recovered and reflown "more than 300 times".)	>300 (Falcon 9 and Heavy)		17,500 kg (reusable); 22,800 kg (expended)	2010-06-04	Active
4	Electron	(United States) (New Zealand) Rocket Lab	First stage	85	9	0 (Note: Rocket Lab flew a recovered Rutherford engine in 2023, but never an entire first stage.)	325 kg (expended)	2017-05-25	Active, reflight cancelled
5	Falcon Heavy	(United States) SpaceX	Side booster	22	18	14	~33,000 kg (all cores reusable); 63,800 kg (expended)	2018-02-07	Active
5	Falcon Heavy	(United States) SpaceX	Center core	11	0 (Note: The center booster used for Arabsat-6A was landed but not recovered.)	0	~33,000 kg (all cores reusable); 63,800 kg (expended)	2018-02-07	Active
5	Falcon Heavy	(United States) SpaceX	Fairing half	>18	>300 (Falcon 9 and Heavy)		~33,000 kg (all cores reusable); 63,800 kg (expended)	2018-02-07	Active
6	Starship	(United States) SpaceX	First stage	15	3	2	100,000 kg (Block 3); 200,000 kg (Block 4)	2023-04-20	Active
6	Starship	(United States) SpaceX	Second stage	15	2	0	100,000 kg (Block 3); 200,000 kg (Block 4)	2023-04-20	Active
7	Vulcan Centaur	(United States) United Launch Alliance	First stage engine module	4	0	0	27,200 kg	2024-01-08	Active, recovery planned
8	New Glenn	(United States) Blue Origin	First stage	3	2	1	45,000 kg	2025-01-16	Active
9	Zhuque-3	(China) LandSpace	First stage	2	1	0	18,300 kg (reusable); 21,300 kg (expended)	2025-12-03	Active, recovery achieved, pending reuse
10	Long March 12A	(China) SAST	First Stage	1	0	0	9,000 kg (reusable); 12,000 kg (expended)	2025-12-23	Active, recovery attempted
11	Tianlong-3	(China) Space Pioneer	First stage	1	0	0	17,000 kg	2026-04-03	Active, recovery planned
12	Long March 12B	(China) CASC	First Stage	1	0	0	12,000 kg (reusable); 20,000 kg (expended)	2026-06-01	Active, recovery planned
13	Long March 10B	(China) CALT	First Stage	1	1	0	16,000 kg (reusable)	2026-07-10	Active, recovery achieved, pending reuse

=== Planned ===
Reusable launch vehicles (by first stage payload)
Vehicle	Organization	Reusable component(s)	Payload to LEO	Planned launch
Long March 9	(China) CALT	Fully Reusable	150,000 kg	2033
Gravity-3	(China) Orienspace	Fully Reusable	100,000 kg	2030
LMLV	(India) ISRO	First stage	85,000 kg	2033
Qitian-2	(China) FSTSpace	First stage	33,000 kg	2028
Glacier-1	(China) Arktech	First stage	32,000 kg	2027
NGLV-H	(India) ISRO	First stage	30,000 kg	2031
Terran R	(United States) Relativity Space	First stage	23,500 kg (reusable); 33,500 kg (expended)	2026
Razor Crest	(India) EtherealX	Fully Reusable	8,000 kg (reusable); 22,800 kg (stage 2 expended); 24,800 kg (fully expended)	2027
Nebula 2	(China) Deep Blue Aerospace	First stage	20,000 kg	2026
Pallas-2	(China) Galactic Energy	First stage	20,000 kg	2027
Gravity-2	(China) Orienspace	First stage	17,400 kg (reusable); 21,500 kg(expended)	2027
Eclipse	(United States) Firefly Aerospace	First stage	16,300 kg	2027
Nova Block 2	(United States) Stoke Space	Fully reusable	15,000 kg (reusable); 23,000 kg (fully expended)	2029
Long March 10A	(China) CALT	First Stage	14,000 kg (reusable); 18,000 kg (expended)	2027
NGLV	(India) ISRO	First stage	14,000 kg	2031
Neutron	(United States) (New Zealand) Rocket Lab	First stage (includes fairing)	13,000 kg (reusable); 15,000 kg (expended)	2026
Yueqian-1	(China) Cosmoleap	First stage	12,000 kg	2027
Kinetica-2	(China) CAS Space	First stage	12,000 kg	2026
Amur	(Russia) Roscosmos	First stage	10,500 kg	2030
Weiguang-1	(China) Welight	First stage and fairing	9,000 kg	2028
Hyperbola-3	(China) I-space	First stage	8,300 kg (reusable); 13,400 kg (expended)	2026
Yuanxingzhe-1	(China) Space Epoch	First Stage	6,500 kg	2026
Pallas-1	(China) Galactic Energy	First stage	5,000 kg	2026
Nova Pathfinder	(United States) Stoke Space	Fully reusable	2,500 kg (reusable); 5,000 kg (stage 2 expended); 7,000 kg (fully expended)	2027
Unknown	(India) Astrobase	First Stage	3,000 kg	2028
Nebula 1	(China) Deep Blue Aerospace	First stage	2,000 kg	2026
Maia	(France) MaiaSpace	First Stage	500 kg (reusable); 1,500 kg (expended); 2,500 kg (3rd stage and expended)	2027
Miura 5	(Spain) PLD Space	First stage	900 kg	2026
Agnibaan	(India) Agnikul	First stage	500 kg	2027
Blue Whale 1	(South Korea) Perigee Aerospace	First stage	170 kg	2026
Ariane Next	(France) ArianeSpace	First Stage	TBD	2030s
Vega Next	(Italy) Avio	TBD	TBD	2030s

== List of reusable spacecraft ==
Reusable spacecrafts
Spacecraft	Organization	Launch Vehicle	Launched	Recovered	Reflown	Launch Mass	First Launch	Status
Space Shuttle orbiter	(United States) NASA	Space Shuttle	135	133	130	110,000 kg	1981-04-12	Retired (2011)
Buran	(Soviet Union) NPO-Energia	Energia	1	1	0	92,000 kg	1988-11-15	Retired (1988)
X-37	(United States) Boeing	Atlas V, Falcon 9, Falcon Heavy	7	7	5	5,000 kg	2010-04-22	Active
Dragon	(United States) SpaceX	Falcon 9	51	49	30	12,519 kg	2010-12-08	Active
Orion	(United States) NASA	Space Launch System	3	3	0	10,400 kg (excluding service module and abort system)	2014-12-05	Active, reflight planned
Starliner	(United States) Boeing	Atlas V	3	3	1	13,000 kg	2019-12-20	Active
Chinese reusable experimental spacecraft	(China) CASC	Long March 2F	3	2	unknown	unknown	2020-09-04	Active, reusability unknown
Dream Chaser	(United States) Sierra Space	Vulcan Centaur	0	0	0	9,000 kg	2026	Planned
Space Rider	ESA	Vega C	0	0	0	4,900 kg	2027	Planned
Mengzhou	(China) CAST	Long March 10A	0	0	0	14,000 kg	2027	Planned

== List of reusable suborbital spacecrafts ==
As of 1 December 2024.

Reusable suborbital spacecrafts
#	Vehicle	Company	First launch to space	Launches to space (Note: only successful launches counted)	Recovered from space (Note: only successful recoveries counted)	Reflown to space (Note: only successful launches counted)
1	New Shepard	(United States) Blue Origin	2015	27	26	22
1	New Shepard	Fully reusable. Active as of December 2024. Of the 27 (successful) launches to space, 3 were to an altitude over 80 km (USAF/NASA limit for space) but below 100 km (international limit for space) and 24 to an altitude over 100 km.				
2	SpaceShipTwo (VSS Unity)	(United States) Virgin Galactic	2018	12	12	11
2	SpaceShipTwo (VSS Unity)	Fully reusable. Retired in 2024. Only flew to above 80 km (USAF/NASA limit for space) but not above 100 km (international limit for space).				
3	SpaceShipOne	(United States) Mojave Aerospace Ventures/Scaled Composites	2004	3	3	2
3	SpaceShipOne	Fully reusable. Retired in 2004. Of the 3 (successful) launches to space, all were to an altitude over 100 km (international limit for space).				
4	North American X-15	(United States) North American Aviation/USAF/NASA	1962	13	12	11
4	North American X-15	Fully reusable. Retired in 1968. Of the 13 (successful) launches to space, 2 were to an altitude over 100 km (international limit for space) and 11 to an altitude over 80 km (USAF/NASA limit for space) but below 100 km.				

== See also ==
- List of private spaceflight companies
- Lunar Lander
- Mars Descent Vehicle
- Mars Ascent Vehicle
- Reusable spacecraft
- SpaceX reusable launch system development program
- Takeoff and landing

== Bibliography ==
- Heribert Kuczera, et al.: Reusable space transportation systems. Springer, Berlin 2011, ISBN 978-3-540-89180-2.
- Edberg, Don; Costa, Willie (2022). Design of Rockets and Space Launch Vehicles (2nd ed.). American Institute of Aeronautics and Astronautics. doi:10.2514/4.106422. ISBN 978-1-62410-641-5.
