= Reusable Booster System =

2010-12 US Air Force space propulsion project

The Reusable Booster System (RBS) was a United States Air Force research program, circa 2010 to 2012, to develop a new prototype vertical-takeoff, horizontal-landing (VTHL) reusable booster and a new prototype expendable second stage to replace the existing Evolved Expendable Launch Vehicles (EELV) after 2025. The program was discontinued in 2012.

== History ==
Program funding was initially set at US$250,000,000."Officials anticipate awarding up to three contracts for the project, where winners would compete for individual tasks of experiments and demonstrations that address technology, processes and other attributes of a reusable booster system, or RBS." The proposal deadline was March 19, 2011. The Air Force had developed a notional plan to build a fleet of eight of the RBS systems, to be flown from both Vandenberg Air Force Base in California and Cape Canaveral Air Force Station in Florida.

Three designs were submitted: by Andrews Space, Boeing and Lockheed Martin. The first phase of the flight experiment in 2014 was to be a vertical takeoff, going downrange at not much more Mach 1, and a horizontal landing.

In December 2011, Lockheed Martin was awarded a contract to build a flight demonstration vehicle, the RBS Pathfinder, which was to have been completed in 2015. It was being developed under the Air Force Research Laboratory's (AFRL) RBS Flight and Ground Experiments (RBS-FGE) program.

In 2012, Lockheed began initial (short burn) rocket engine tests.

Phase 2 (e.g. demonstrating the rocketback maneuver) was cancelled by September 2012.

The program was discontinued in October 2012, citing Department of Defense funding reductions and an October 2012 negative report by the National Research Council (NRC), after having expended only a small fraction of the original $250 million budget planned to be spent through 2019.

Among other factors, the October 2012 NRC report suggested that the Air Force "should develop and fly more than one Pathfinder test vehicle design [and that] competition amongst RBS concepts should be maintained as long as possible to obtain the best system for the next generation of space launch."

== Propulsion ==
A large-liquid-engine group comprising the Air Force Space Command, propulsion researchers from AFRL and Space and Missile Systems Center's launch systems program office was also meeting to discuss engine options. The group considered whether to focus on developing oxygen-rich, staged combustion (ORSC) engines like the Air Force's long-running Hydrocarbon Boost program, use an existing design like the TR-107 or evolve a newer engine such as Pratt & Whitney Rocketdyne's J-2X or RL60. Any path would have resulted in building an engine capable of roughly 250,000 lbf (1112 kN) thrust by 2020.

== See also ==
- Baikal (rocket booster)
- Liquid fly-back booster, a 1999–2004 study for Ariane
- Reusable launch system
- Rocket-based combined cycle engine
- Space Launch Initiative, (ca. 2002–2004)
- XS-1, a later DARPA project with similar goals
