= Liquid fly-back booster =

Launch vehicle study

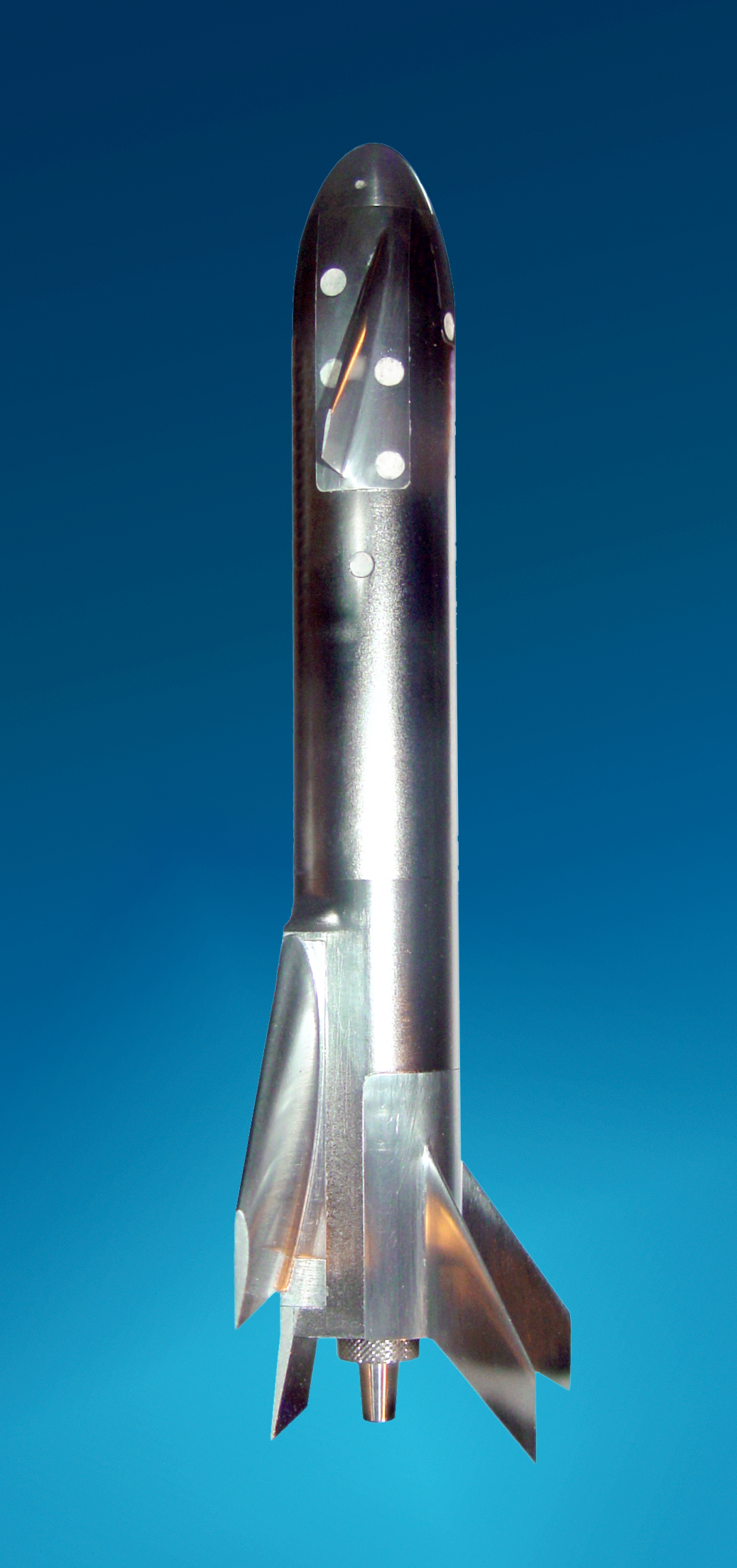
The LFBB model used in wind tunnel tests by the German Aerospace Center (DLR)

Liquid Fly-back Booster (LFBB) was a German Aerospace Center's (DLR's) project concept to develop a liquid rocket booster capable of reuse for Ariane 5 in order to significantly reduce the high cost of space transportation and increase environmental friendliness. LFBB would replace the existing solid rocket boosters, which provided the majority of thrust from liftoff to separation. Once separated, the two winged boosters would perform an atmospheric entry, go back autonomously to the French Guiana, and land horizontally on the airport like an aeroplane.

Additionally a family of derivative launch vehicles was proposed in order to take an advantage of economies of scale, further reducing launch costs. These derivatives include:

- A reusable booster in a class of small, medium-lift launch and heavy lift boosters like Vega and SLS.
- A super-heavy-lift launch vehicle capable of lifting nearly 70 tonnes (150,000 lb) to the orbit.
- A two-stage-to-orbit system operating a dedicated reusable orbiter.

German Aerospace Center studied Liquid Fly-back Boosters as a part of future launcher research programme from 1999 to 2004. After the cancellation of the project, publications at DLR continued until 2009.

== Development ==
The German Aerospace Center (DLR) studied potential future launch vehicles of the European Union under the Ausgewählte Systeme und Technologien für Raumtransport (ASTRA; English: Systems and Technologies for Space Transportation Applications) programme from 1999 to 2005, with additional studies continuing until 2009. The LFBB design was one of two projects within the ASTRA program, the other being Phoenix RLV. During development, scale models were constructed for testing various configurations in DLR's supersonic Trisonische Messstrecke Köln (TMK; English: Trisonic measuring section at Cologne) and in their Hyperschallwindkanal 2 Köln (H2K; English: Hypersonic wind canal at Cologne) wind tunnels. The preliminary mechanical design of other major elements was done by the companies ESA and NASA.

The advantages of reusable boosters include simplicity from using only one type of fuel, environmental friendliness, and lower reoccurring costs. Studies concluded that reusable fly-back boosters would be the most affordable and the least risky way for European space launch systems to start becoming reusable. These fly-back boosters had the potential to reduce launch costs. However, when other projects, such as Space Shuttle or VentureStar, undertook this objective, they failed to meet their goals. Supporting technologies needed for LFBB construction can be developed within 10 years, and additional launchers can be developed based on fly-back boosters to minimise costs and provide maintenance synergy across multiple classes of launch vehicles.

Eventually, the hardware grew too large and the LFBB project was scrapped, with one member of the French space agency (CNES) remarking:

The thing that shocked me was that at the beginning, this reusable flyback booster was just a cylinder with engines and little wings, just a turbo fan in the back. And three years later these were complete Airbuses in terms of size with four engines in each of them.

— Christophe Bonnal, CNES launcher directorate

== Description ==
A line drawing of DLR's LFBB, showing top, front, and side views

The overall concept of the liquid boosters in the LFBB programme was to retain the Ariane 5's core and upper stages, along with the payload fairings, and replace its solid rocket boosters (EAP P241, from French Étages d’Accélération à Poudre) with reusable liquid rocket boosters. These boosters would provide the main thrust during take-off. After separation, they would return to a spaceport in French Guiana for landing. This vertical take-off, horizontal landing (VTHL) mode of operation would allow liquid fly-back boosters to continue operating from the Guiana Space Centre, thus avoiding any major changes to the ascend profile of Ariane 5. Launch vehicle payload performance of the Cryogenic Evolution type-A (ECA) variant would increase from 10,500 kg (23,100 lb) to 12,300 kg (27,100 lb).

In the reference design, each LFBB consists of three engines installed in a circular arrangement at the aft of the vehicle. Each engine is a Vulcain engine with reduced expansion ratio. An additional three turbofan air-breathing engines, installed in the nose section, provide power for fly-back. The fuselage is 41 m (135 ft) long, with an outer tank diameter of 5.45 m (17.9 ft), specifically designed to match the existing Ariane 5 core stage and to reduce manufacturing costs. A low-wing V-tail canard configuration was selected, with a wingspan of approximately 21 m (69 ft) and an area of 115 m^{2} (1,240 sq ft). The aerofoil was based on a transonic profile from the Royal Aircraft Establishment (RAE 2822). The gross lift-off mass (GLOW) of each booster is 222.5 tonnes (245.3 short tons), with 54 tonnes (60 short tons) upon separation and 46.2 tonnes (50.9 short tons) dry mass. In comparison, the GLOW for EAP P241 is 273 tonnes (301 short tons).

The booster was designed to have four independent propulsion systems, the first of which – main rocket propulsion – would be based on three gimbaled Vulcain engines fueled by 168,500 kg (371,500 lb) of propellant. Second, Eurojet EJ200 fly-back turbofan engines would be propelled with hydrogen to reduce fuel mass. Further, ten 2 kN (450 lb_{f}) thrusters placed on each side of the vehicle would be used by the reaction control system. Finally, the fourth propulsion system would be based on solid rocket motors that separate the boosters from the core stage. An up-scaled version of the motors used in existing EAP boosters would be mounted in the attachment ring and inside the wing's main structure.

A typical mission profile would begin with the ignition of a main stage and both boosters, followed by an acceleration to 2 km/s (1.2 mi/s) and then a separation at the altitude of 50 km (31 mi). As the main stage continues its flight into orbit, the boosters follow a ballistic trajectory, reaching an altitude of 90–100 km (56–62 mi). After low-energy atmospheric entry, the boosters reach denser layers of the atmosphere where they perform a banking turn toward the target airfield. Gliding continues until they achieve an altitude that is optimal for engaging turbofan engines and entering cruise flight. At this point, about 550 km (340 mi) from the launch point, the boosters would be flying over the Atlantic Ocean. The cruise back to the airport requires about 3,650 kg (8,050 lb) of hydrogen fuel and takes over two hours to complete. An undercarriage is deployed and each booster lands autonomously. After separation, the boosters are not under threat of collision until they land due to small differences in their initial flight trajectories.

== Derivatives ==
The development of liquid fly-back boosters has the potential to enable three additional space transportation systems with an objective of increasing production and creating economies of scale. The aim of the LFBB project at DLR was to reduce Ariane 5 operational costs and to develop future derivatives, including a reusable first stage of a small-to-medium launch vehicle, a super-heavy launch vehicle capable of lifting 67 tonnes (74 short tons) to Low Earth orbit, and a reusable two-stage-to-orbit launch vehicle. Initially, LFBBs would be used only on Ariane 5. Over time, alternative configurations could phase out Arianespace Soyuz and Vega.

=== Reusable first stage ===
Top view of RFS configurations: Vega and Ariane 5 derivatives (top), large cryogenic upper stage (bottom) with the LFBB shown in blue

The LFBB was studied with the three upper stage composites, to attain a Reusable First Stage (RFS) configuration. The first was a Vega derivative, with a Zefiro 23 second stage, a Zefiro 9 third stage and an AVUM upper stage. With the LFBB replacing the P80 stage, the payload to Sun-synchronous orbit (SSO) would increase to 1,882 kg (4,149 lb), compared to the 1,450 kg (3,200 lb) of the Vega. The second was an Ariane 4 derivative called H-25. It was based on an H10 upper stage with a Vinci rocket engine and 25 tonnes (28 short tons) of cryogenic fuel. Depending on the method of deceleration, the payload to SSO is between 1,481 and 2,788 kg (3,265 and 6,146 lb). The third was a large cryogenic upper stage, called H-185, based on an alternative, yet-to-be-developed Ariane 5 main stage with 185 tonnes (204 short tons) of cryogenic fuel. Its payload to SSO is 5,000 kg (11,000 lb).

Two of the lighter configurations (the Zefiro 23 and the H-25) use upper stages mounted on top of the booster. Due to the lower weight, it might have been necessary to lower the amount of fuel in a booster to ensure that the separation velocity, the flight path, and the reentry do not exceed design bounds. In the case of H-25, it might be necessary to accelerate the fly-back boosters to above 2 km/s (1.2 mi/s) to help the upper stage achieve its desired orbit. Consequently, two solutions were proposed to decelerate the boosters after separation. The first option was to actively decelerate them using 10 tonnes (11 short tons) of fuel and reduce the velocity by 300 m/s (980 ft/s). However, launch performance would drop below that of the Vega derivative. Another option is to use aerodynamic forces to decelerate. However, a hypersonic parachute was deemed too expensive and too complex. As a result, an alternative ballute was proposed. Flight dynamics simulation revealed that a ballute with a cross-section of 45 m^{2} (480 sq ft) offered the best compromise between loads on the booster and deceleration by aerodynamic forces. In this configuration, a launch performance of up to 2,788 kg (6,146 lb) could be achieved, partly thanks to a higher separation velocity.

The heaviest configuration uses a single booster with an asymmetrically mounted, large, expendable cryogenic stage designated H-185. It was proposed as a future variant of the Ariane 5 core stage (H158), eventually meant to phase out the main stage in a standard launch configuration with LFBB. H-185 would use a new Vulcain 3 main engine, with increased vacuum thrust. When launched with a single booster, both stages would be operated in parallel, and be delivered to a 180 by 800 km (110 by 500 mi) orbit before separation. The remaining upper stage composite would weigh 7,360 kg (16,230 lb), with a 5,000 kg (11,000 lb) payload performance to SSO. When launching to Low Earth orbit, payload mass can be increased to over 10,000 kg (22,000 lb).

=== Super-Heavy Lift Launcher (SHLL) ===
Top view of the SHLL configuration with the LFBB shown in blue

The Super-Heavy Lift Launcher (SHLL) would consist of a new cryogenic main stage, five liquid fly-back boosters, and a re-ignitable injection stage. This configuration was designed to provide increased capabilities for complex missions, including crewed explorations to the Moon and to Mars, as well as the launch of large solar-powered satellites.

The new core stage would stand 28.65 m (94.0 ft) tall and have a diameter of 10 m (33 ft), feeding 600 tonnes (660 short tons) of LOX/LH_{2} to three Vulcain 3 engines. The increased circumference of the main stage allows five LFBBs to be integrated with either retractable or variable-geometry wings. The upper stage would be a derivative of the Ariane 5 ESC-B, with the size upped to 5.6 m × 8.98 m (18.4 ft × 29.5 ft), and strengthened to bear higher loads. The Vinci engine was proofed to be sufficiently powerful for orbital insertion. Payload would be enclosed in an 8 m × 29.5 m (26 ft × 97 ft) fairing. The launch vehicle would have a total height of 69 m (226 ft) and a mass of 1,900 tonnes (2,100 short tons). The payload to LEO would be 67,280 kg (148,330 lb).

When launched to a 200 km × 600 km (120 mi × 370 mi) Low Earth transfer orbit, the LFBBs would separate at an altitude of 51 km (32 mi), at a speed of 1.55 km/s (0.96 mi/s). To avoid simultaneous separation of all boosters, either a cross-feed to the main stage, or throttling could be used. The return flight of the boosters would require an estimated 3,250 kg (7,170 lb) of fuel, including a 30% reserve.

=== Two-stage-to-orbit ===
Top view of the TSTO configuration with the LFBB shown in blue

The reusable two-stage-to-orbit (TSTO) launch vehicle variant of LFBB was planned to be implemented about 15 years after the addition of LFBBs to Ariane 5. However, only a preliminary analysis of TSTO was completed. The proposed configuration consisted of two boosters with retractable wings attached to the external fuel tank, and a reusable orbiter with fixed wings carrying payload on top of it. During geostationary transfer orbit (GTO) missions, an additional, expandable upper stage would be used.

The external tank, being a core of the system, would have a diameter of 5.4 metres (18 ft) and a height of 30.5 metres (100 ft), carrying 167.5 tonnes (184.6 short tons) of propellant. The attached orbiter would be 28.8 metres (94 ft) tall and 3.6 metres (12 ft) in diameter, carrying 50 tonnes (55 short tons) of propellant. The payload fairing mount atop the orbiter would be 5.4 by 20.5 metres (18 ft × 67 ft). For LEO missions, the launch vehicle would be 57.3 metres (188 ft) tall, with a gross lift-off mass of 739.4 tonnes (815.0 short tons). The payload to LEO would be 12,800 kilograms (28,200 lb), with an increase to 8,500 kilograms (18,700 lb) to GTO when using an expandable upper stage.

== See also ==
- Baikal (rocket booster) – Re-useable rocket booster proposed for Angara carrier rocket
- Falcon Heavy – Partially-reusable super heavy-lift launch vehicle by SpaceX
- RETALT
- Reusable Booster System – 2010-12 US Air Force space propulsion project
