= General Dynamics Nexus =

Conceptual rocket design

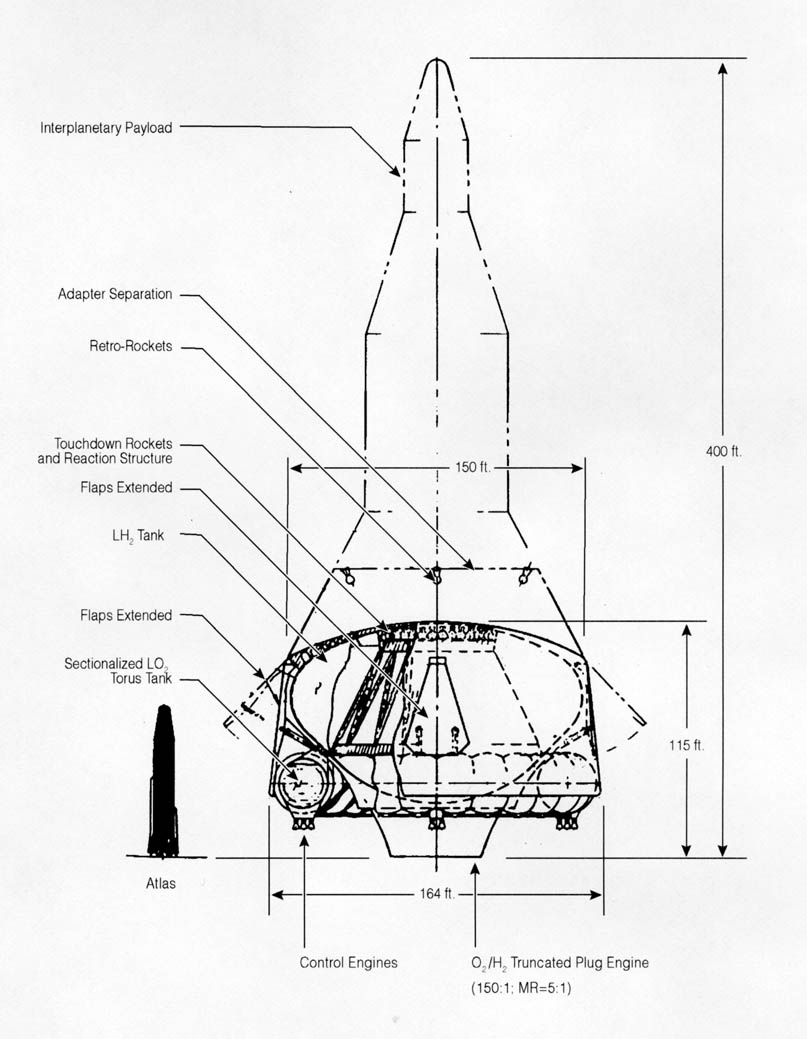
NEXUS heavy-lift booster concept. Hydrolox truncated plug engine. Atlas ICBM at lower left indicates scale.

The NEXUS reusable rocket was a concept design created in the 1960s by a group at General Dynamics led by Krafft Arnold Ehricke. It was intended as the next leap beyond the Saturn V, carrying up to eight times as much payload. Several versions were designed, including 12,000 and 24,000 short ton vehicles with payloads of one thousand and two thousand short tons respectively. The larger version had a diameter of 202 feet (61.5 metres). It was never built.

It was a single-stage-to-orbit vehicle that would be fully recoverable upon landing in the ocean. It would use parachutes to slow descent, with retrorockets (on top) for a final soft touchdown.
