= Baikal (rocket booster) =

Re-useable rocket booster proposed for Angara carrier rocket

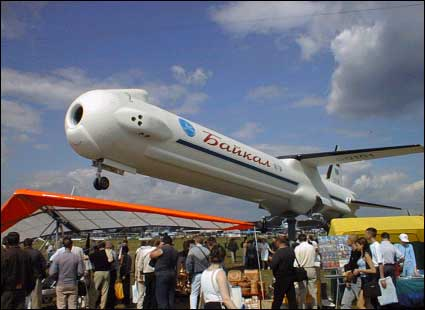
Mockup of booster at the Paris Air Show.

The Baikal booster (Russian: Байкал) was a proposed reusable flyback booster for the Angara rocket family based on the Angara Universal Rocket Module in 2001. It was designed by the Molniya Research and Industrial Corporation (NPO Molniya) for the Khrunichev Space centre, reusing the flyback and control system for the reusable Buran orbiter.

== Description ==
The booster would be equipped with an RD-191 rocket engine burning kerosene and liquid oxygen to provide approximately 200 tons of thrust. In addition, it would be equipped with a folding wing stored parallel to the fuselage of the vehicle during the booster stage of the flight. After separation from the Angara launcher's second stage at an altitude of about 75 kilometers and a speed of Mach 5.6 (5,800 km/h; 3,600 mph), the Baikal's wing would rotate 90 degrees and the booster glides in upside down position reducing speed. Once the booster reaches subsonic speeds, a U-turn is performed and an air-breathing RD-33 jet engine in its nose section is started to fly back to its launching site and make a powered horizontal landing on a runway. Apart from economic advantages, this procedure greatly reduces the risk of falling space debris. Reducing this risk was important as the Angara rockets will be launched from the deep inland Plesetsk Cosmodrome.

== Development ==
A full-size engineering mock-up of the Baikal was exhibited at the Paris Air Show in July 2001. Similar mockups were tested in wind tunnels of the Central Aero- and Hydrodynamics Institute TsAGI, at speeds of 0.5 – 10 Mach. However, according to unofficial statements by Khrunichev Center representatives, there would have been a long development program to the production of models for captive tests, and the mock-up demonstrated at Le Bourget differs greatly in appearance and design from the Baikal that will actually be launched. As of June 2016, Roscosmos claimed that the development was essentially complete, but funding for the manufacture of the flying prototype of the recoverable booster was absent due to the low expected launch rate.

== See also ==
- Liquid fly-back booster – Launch vehicle study
- Reusable Booster System – 2010-12 US Air Force space propulsion project
- Reusable launch system – Vehicles that can go to space and return
