= Two-stage-to-orbit =

Rocket with two stages

A two-stage-to-orbit (TSTO) or two-stage rocket is a launch vehicle in which two distinct stages provide propulsion consecutively in order to achieve orbital velocity. It is intermediate between a three-stage-to-orbit launcher and a hypothetical single-stage-to-orbit (SSTO) launcher.

At liftoff the first stage is responsible for accelerating the vehicle. At some point the second stage detaches from the first stage and continues to orbit under its own power.

These systems have advantages over both alternatives. Unlike a single-state-to-orbit craft, most of the dry mass is not carried into orbit. This results in a greater fraction of the mass-to-orbit being payload, rather than "dead weight," which reduces launch cost. Simultaneously, it is less complex and has fewer separation events than a system with more stages, which reduces cost and risk of failure.

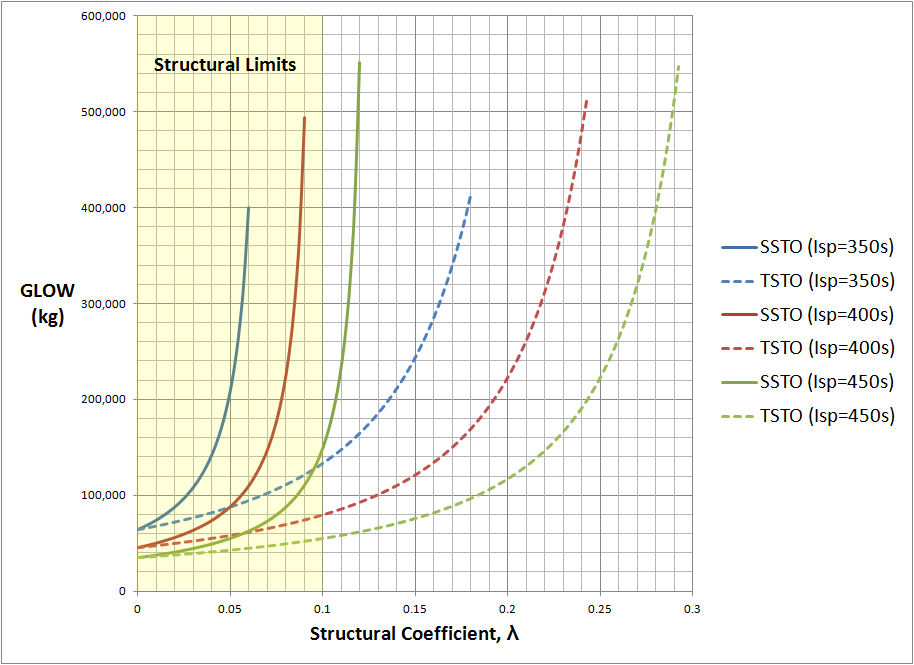
Importance of Structural coefficient and I_{SP} for Single-Stage-to-Orbit (SSTO) and restricted stage Two-Stage-to-Orbit (TSTO) vehicles. Based on a LEO mission of Delta v = 9.1 km/s and payload mass = 4500 kg for range of propellant Isp. GLOW=Gross Lift-Off Weight

== Examples ==
- Historical
  - Cosmos-3M
  - Delta IV Medium
  - Falcon 1
  - Saturn IB
  - Titan II GLV
  - Tsyklon-2
  - Zenit-2 and Zenit-2M
- Current
  - Atlas V 401 and 501
  - Electron
  - Falcon 9
  - Vulcan Centaur
  - Starship
  - New Glenn
- In development
  - Angara 1.2
  - Miura 5

It is not always clear when a vehicle is a TSTO, due to the use of strap-on booster rockets at launch. These are dropped early on in the flight and may or may not be considered an additional stage if the core engine(s) continue firing. These are sometimes considered half a stage, leading to the expression one-and-a-half-stage-to-orbit (1.5STO) e.g. for the Long March 5B or the Atlas missile, which was a single core stage with additional boosters. Similarly, two-stage designs with additional boosters can be referred to as 2.5-stage rockets e.g. the Ariane 5 or most Atlas V variants (all except the 401 and 501).

== Reusable launch systems ==
With reference to a reusable launch system this approach is often proposed as an alternative to single-stage-to-orbit (or SSTO). Its supporters argue that, since each stage may have a lower mass ratio than an SSTO launch system, such a system may be built further away from limits of its structural materials. It is argued that a two-stage design should require less maintenance, less testing, experience fewer failures and have a longer working life. In addition the two-stage approach allows the lower stage to be optimized for operation in the Earth's lower atmosphere, where pressure and drag are high, while the upper stage can be optimized for operation in the near-vacuum conditions of the later part of the launch. This allows an increase in the payload mass fraction of a two-stage vehicle over single-stage or stage-and-a-half vehicles, which have to perform in both environments using the same hardware.

Critics argue that the increased complexity of designing two separate stages that must interact, the logistics involved in returning the first stage to the launch site, and the difficulties of conducting incremental testing on a second stage will outweigh these benefits. In the case of airplane-like lower stages they also argue how difficult and expensive high speed aircraft (like the SR-71) are to develop and operate, and question performance claims. A number of 'mini-shuttle' designs that use transport aircraft as first stages also face similar problems with ice/foam as the Space Shuttle due to the requirement they also carry a large external tank for their fuel.

As of 2023, SpaceX and NASA are the only launch providers which have achieved first-stage reuse of an orbital vehicle with SpaceX’s two-stage Falcon 9 and 2.5-stage Falcon Heavy, and NASA’s Space Shuttle Solid Rocket Boosters. Rocket Lab has recovered multiple first stages of their Electron rocket, but has not flown them again.

=== Helicopter-like first stage ===
Taking the view that airplane like operations do not translate to airplane-like appearance, some reusable TSTO concepts have first stages that operate as VTOL or VTOHL aircraft. The DC-X has proven the VTOL option design workable. Other designs like the DH-1 concept take it a step further and use a 'pop-up/pop-down' approach, which delivers the orbiting stage to a point about 60 km above the Earth's surface, before dropping down to the launch pad again. In the case of the DH-1, the upper stage is effectively an 'almost SSTO' with a more realistic mass fraction and which was optimised for reliability.

=== Airplane-like first stage ===
Some TSTO designs comprise an airplane-like first stage and a rocket-like second stage. The airplane elements can be wings, air-breathing engines, or both. This approach appeals because it transforms Earth's atmosphere from an obstacle into an advantage. Above a certain speed and altitude, wings and scramjets cease being effective, and the rocket is deployed to complete the trip to orbit.

Saenger (spacecraft) was among the first concepts of this type.

While not an orbital vehicle, the successful private SpaceShipOne suborbital spacecraft developed for the Ansari X Prize demonstrated that a two-stage system with a winged aircraft as the "lower half" can reach the edge of space. The team behind SpaceShipOne has built and flown a commercial sub-orbital launch system — SpaceShipTwo — based on this technology.

The Pegasus rocket while airplane launched, is not a two-stage-to-orbit system because the rocket component itself is composed of multiple stages.

== See also ==
- Single-stage-to-orbit
