= List of rockets launched from El Arenosillo =

This is a list of rockets launched from the El Arenosillo rocket launch facility in south Spain.

Date	Vehicle	Mission/Payload	Launch pad	Result	Results
15 Oct 1966	Skua	INTA, Carabela 4 Aeronomy / test		Success	81 km
28 Mar 1969	Nike-Cajun	NASA, 10.309GM Grenades		Success	121 km
29 Mar 1969	Nike-Cajun	NASA, 10.310GM Grenades		Success	122 km
8 May 1969	Nike-Cajun	NASA, 10.311GM Grenades		Success	90 km
10 May 1969	Nike-Cajun	NASA, 10.312GM Grenades		Success	88 km
19 Jun 1969	INTA-255	INTA, Technology		Success	reduced version
20 Dec 1969	INTA-255#1	INTA, Technology		Success	73 km
22 Dec 1970	INTA-255#2	INTA		Success	132 km
22 Mar 1971	Skua II	IASB, NO release		Success	63 km
23 Mar 1971	Skua II	IASB, NO release		Success	72 km
23 Mar 1971	Skua II	IASB, NO release		Success	71 km
24 Mar 1971	Skua II	IASB, NO release		Success	69 km
24 Mar 1971	Skua II	IASB, NO release		Success	71 km
26 Apr 1971	Centaure 136	CNES, Na release + TNT		Success	129 km
26 Apr 1971	Nike-Cajun	NASA, 10.319II TMA release		Success	154 km
21 May 1971	Skua II	INTA, TMA release			
26 May 1971	Centaure 141	CNES, Na release + TNT		Success	128 km
26 May 1971	Nike-Cajun	NASA, 10.386II TMA release		Success	
27 May 1971	Nike-Cajun	NASA, 10.387II TMA release		Success	
27 May 1971	Centaure 137	CNES, Na release + TNT		Success	129 km
27 May 1971	Centaure 142	CNES, Na release + TNT		Success	127 km
28 May 1971	Nike-Cajun	NASA, 10.387II TMA release		Success	
28 May 1971	Skua II	INTA, TMA release			
03 Jul 1972	Nike-Apache	NASA, 14.483GI		Success	122 km
06 Jul 1972	Nike-Cajun	NASA, 10.408GI		Success	85 km
02 Oct 1973	Skylark 4	MPE, UV Astronomy		Success	186 km
06 Oct 1973	Skylark 4	MPE, UV Astronomy		Success	260 km
27 Nov 1973	Skylark 4	MPE, UV Astronomy		Success	246 km
12 Jan 1974	Skylark 4	MPE, UV Astronomy			EF. 245 km
07 Oct 1974	Skylark 6	SL1304/MPE, XR Astronomy		Success	190 km
09 Oct 1974	INTA-300#1	INTA, Technology		Success	SP. 250 km
09 Oct 1975	Skylark 6	MPIA, ASTRO-7 Zodiacal light		Success	
21 Oct 1975	INTA-300#2	Technology		Partial success	SP. 295 km
17 Dec 1975	Skua II	Payload prototype			
02 Jan 1976	Skua III	Winter Anomaly, BI			95 km
04 Jan 1976	Petrel I	Winter Anomaly, BIII			83 km
04 Jan 1976	Nike-Apache	Winter Anomaly, BIV			128 km
04 Jan 1976	Skylark 3	Winter Anomaly, BII			117 km
04 Jan 1976	Skua III	Winter Anomaly, BI			103 km
04 Jan 1976	Petrel I	Winter Anomaly, BVI			135 km
04 Jan 1976	Skua IV	Winter Anomaly, BV			96 km
06 Jan 1976	Skua II	Winter Anomaly, BI			97 km
09 Jan 1976	Skua II	Winter Anomaly, BI			99 km
12 Jan 1976	Skua III	Winter Anomaly, BI			92 km
14 Jan 1976	Skua III	Winter Anomaly, BI			91 km
20 Jan 1976	Petrel I	Winter Anomaly, B?			
20 Jan 1976	Skua III	Winter Anomaly, BI			93 km
21 Jan 1976	Petrel I	Winter Anomaly, BIII			83 km
21 Jan 1976	Nike-Apache	Winter Anomaly, BIV			128 km
21 Jan 1976	Skylark 3	Winter Anomaly, BII			119 km
21 Jan 1976	Skua II	Winter Anomaly, BI			98 km
21 Jan 1976	Petrel I	Winter Anomaly, BVI			135 km
21 Jan 1976	Petrel I	Winter Anomaly, BVI			135 km
21 Jan 1976	Skua IV	Winter Anomaly, BV			109 km
22 Jan 1976	Skua II	Winter Anomaly, BI			94 km
23 Jan 1976	Skua II	Winter Anomaly, BI			104 km
26 Jan 1976	Skua III	Winter Anomaly, BI			100 km
28 Jan 1976	Skua III	Winter Anomaly, BI			94 km
05 Feb 1976	Skua II	Winter Anomaly, BI			104 km
05 Feb 1976	Skua IV	Winter Anomaly, BV			103 km
08 Feb 1976	Petrel I	Winter Anomaly, B?			
08 Feb 1976	Skua II	Winter Anomaly, BI			100 km
10 Mar 1976	Black Brant IV	ASTRO-6, EUV radiation		Failure	F
4 May 1976	Skua IV	Winter Anomaly, BV			102 km
5 May 1976	Skua II	Winter Anomaly, BI			94 km
5 May 1976	Skua IV	Winter Anomaly, BV			95 km
8 May 1976	Skua II	Winter Anomaly, BI			952 km
8 May 1976	Petrel I	Winter Anomaly, BIII			74 km
15 May 1976	Skua III	Winter Anomaly, BI			89 km
15 May 1976	Petrel I	Winter Anomaly, BIII			
27 Jun 1976	Black Brant IV	ASTRO-6, EUV radiation		Success	720 km
17 Jul 1976	Skylark 7	SL1402/MPE, XR Astronomy		Success	
10 Jun 1977	Black Brant V	Heatpipe II		Success	320 km
12 Dec 1977	Centaure	INTA, Ionosphere			
16 Dec 1977	Centaure	INTA, Ionosphere			
28 Jun 1978	INTA-300#3	Ba cloud		Failure	EF (explosion)
24 Sep 1979	Petrel P217E	Ba cloud		Failure	EF (30 km)
03 Oct 1979	Petrel P218E	Ba cloud		Success	145 km
12 Dec 1980	Nike-Apache	INTA, Ionosphere			
18 Dec 1980	Nike-Apache	INTA, Ionosphere			
18 Feb 1981	INTA-300#4	Technology		Success	285 km
19 Dec 1981	Petrel	IAA, FOCCA		Success	106 km
15 Mar 1982	Petrel	IAA, FOCCA		Failure	VF
7 Apr 1992	INTA-100			Success	120 km
21 Oct 1993	INTA-300B#1	Photometry		Partial success	SP (155 km)
16 Apr 1994	INTA-300B#2	Photometry		Success	(155 km)
2015	Stratos II+	?		Partial success	?
1 March 2017	Bloostar	?	–	Success	Bloostar first test
26 Jul 2018	Stratos III	?		Failure	?
7 Oct 2023	Miura 1	Payload from ZARM	Médano del Loro	Success	46 km
May 2021 (Expected)	Bondar	?		-	11 km expected

S: success; SP: partial success; SF: system failure; VF: vehicle failure; EF: experiment failure
