= El Hierro Launch Centre =

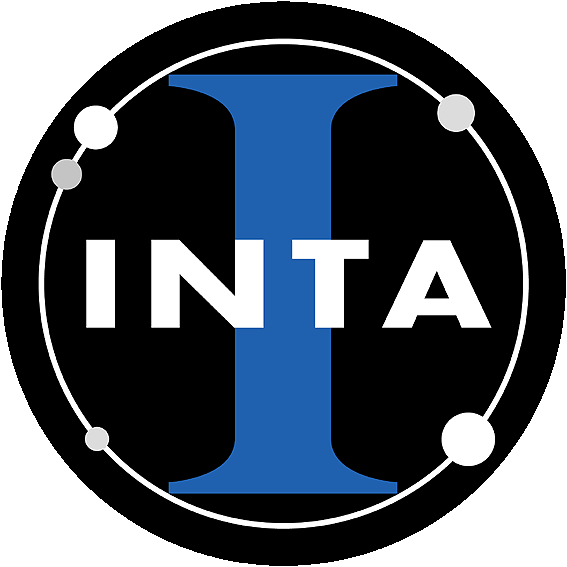
- Location: El Pinar, El Hierro, Canary Islands, Spain
- Coordinates: 27.641613°N 17.991530°W
- Operator: INTA
- Orbital inclination range: 72.3°-105.0°, 121.3°-152.3°
Launch history
- First launch: 2022 (proposed)
- Associated rockets: Capricornio, Argo, Miura 5

El Hierro Launch Centre (in Spanish: Centro de Lanzamiento Espacial de La Isla de El Hierro) is a proposed project by Instituto Nacional de Técnica Aeroespacial (INTA) to create a spaceport on the island of El Hierro, part of the Canary Islands. It would be located in the south of the island, in the area of Tacorón, 5 km from La Restinga. in the municipality of El Pinar, Canary Islands. It is being proposed as a center of civil use exclusively, for the launch of micro- and nanosatellites with scientific or commercial objectives, such as telecommunications or Earth observation.

The launch location would allow reaching polar orbit with a margin, without affecting the countries of West Africa. It could also be launched into an inclined equatorial orbit. Other conditions that make the island a good location are the small population of the island, and the reduced maritime and air traffic, as only one airway passes over the island's airspace. El Hierro's climate also favors launch operations with annual averages of 2382 light hours, only 22 days with rainfall and a mostly stable temperature.

It would allow reaching a polar, heliosynchronous or geostationary orbit. The launch azimuth angles could be from 181° to 197° and from 216° to 323°. Other angles would not be possible due to overflights from the other Canary Islands, Africa and Europe. However, angles between 160° and 181° could be used with the consent of African sovereignties.

== History ==
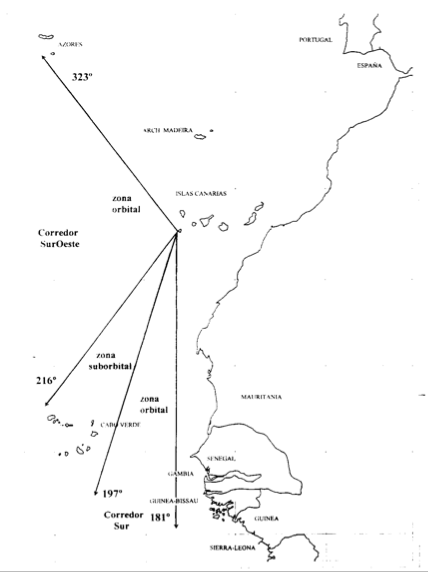
Launch corridors from El Hierro

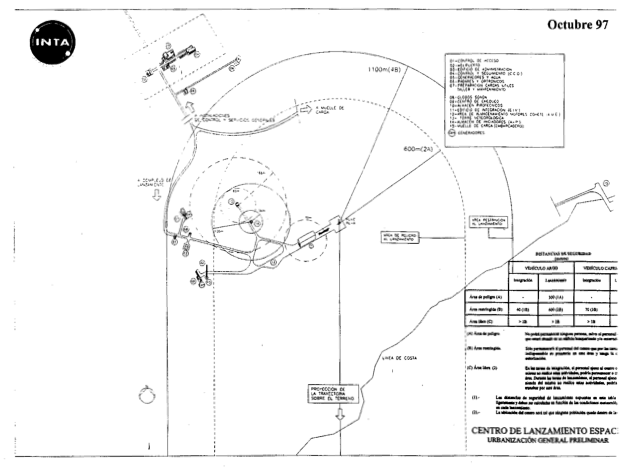
Planned facilities for the space center.

In 1996 INTA announced its interest in creating a spaceport in El Hierro island, part of the Canary Islands archipelago. It would be the launch site for the Capricornio rocket, in development by that time, and the Minisat 01 satellite.

The proposed project had opposition from environmental organizations. It was then proposed to a different location, to Borque de El Barbudo, near Faro de Orchilla. On 28 December 1996, there was a demonstration in which about 4,000 people convened by the Malpaso Commission participated, expressing opposition to the spaceport, and to a military radar proposed for Pico de Malpaso, as they understood that the island would clearly become a military objective.

On 19 March 1997, the Canary Islands local government created a commission to study the project's suitability, where the local government officially opposed the project.

INTA's director announced that the spaceport would have modest objectives and it would be small. From there, small satellites would be launched, with solid fuel rockets and for low-altitude orbits. For launching large satellites, there is already the Guiana base in Kourou (French Guiana), of the European Space Agency (ESA). But for small missions, the general director of INTA said, Kourou is expensive.

During three years the Spanish government included 3,000 million pesetas (18,03 million Euro) in its budget, but still the project had opposition and was not implemented.

In 2015, the spaceport project was proposed again because of the plans of PLD Space to develop and launch a new rocket for small payloads, so INTA has agreed to help them procure a launch site. The environmental organization Ossinisa shared again its concerns about the project. PLD Space replied that they are still considering other locations and argued that the purposes of the company are exclusively scientific and commercial, not military. On the environmental aspect they also argued that rockets leave the place "in less than ten seconds" and mentioned Cape Canaveral as an example: "one of the largest aquatic reserves in the United States where more than 60 rockets are launched per year".

In 2016, United Left sent a formal query to the European Commission about their view on this emplacement, given that the island enjoys a high level of environmental protection. The Commission answered that the project at that location would be allowed, but the Government of Spain should comply with European regulations.

In 2019, INTA's director José María Salom Piqueres commented in an interview that the project was being studied.

== See also ==
- List of Spaceports
- El Arenosillo Test Centre
- Instituto Nacional de Técnica Aeroespacial
