= BOOTES =

Network of robotic astronomical observatories

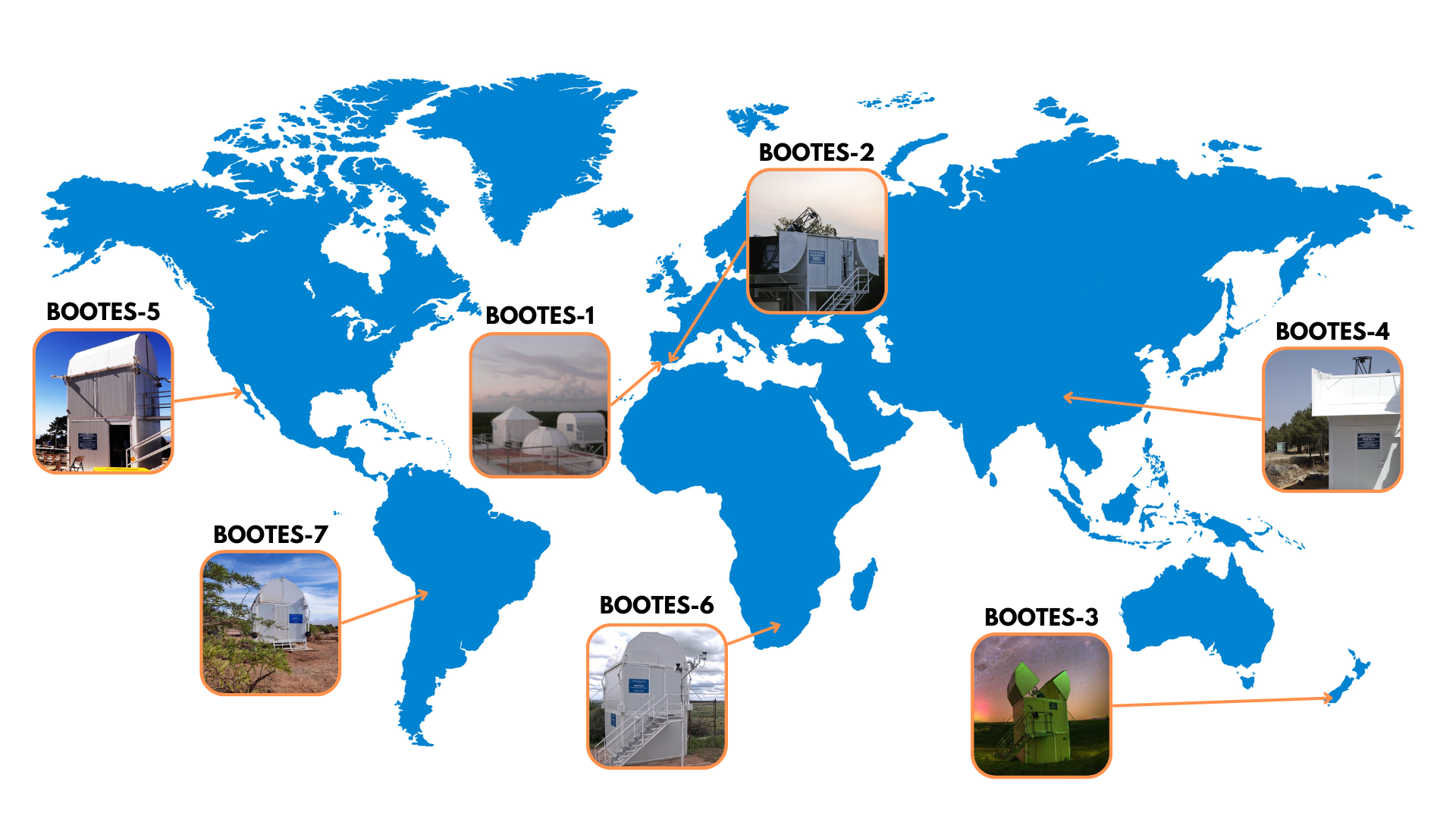
The BOOTES worldwide network of robotic telescopes, which was completed in 2022

BOOTES (Burst Observer and Optical Transient Exploring System) is a global network of robotic astronomical observatories with seven sites located in Spain (two stations), New Zealand, China, Mexico, South Africa and Chile. While the BOOTES-1 station in Spain is devoted to wide-field astronomy, the additional stations (BOOTES-2 in Spain, BOOTES-3 in New Zealand, BOOTES-4 in China, BOOTES-5 in Mexico, BOOTES-6 in South Africa and BOOTES-7 in Chile) include a similar setup (hardware and software): the 0.6m diameter robotic telescope, the EMCCD camera at the Cassegrain focus and the u'g'r'i'ZY filterset (only the u' filter is lacking in BOOTES-2), which makes the BOOTES Network a unique resource for combining the data from all the instruments worldwide.

The BOOTES Network is managed by Instituto de Astrofísica de Andalucía (IAA) of the Consejo Superior de Investigaciones Cientificas (CSIC) with the strong involvement of the University of Málaga in collaboration with other Spanish and international entities abroad.

The BOOTES Network was fully deployed in 2022, thus becoming the first network of robotic telescopes with sites in all continents. The main goal of the network is to quickly observe transient events within seconds or minutes of being detected by scientific satellites.

BOOTES provides an automated real time response to the detection of Gamma Ray Bursts (GRBs) and other incoming alerts (neutrino sources, gravitational waves, etc.). Error box size depending, it uses wide field cameras (WFC), ultra wide field cameras (UWFC) and narrow field cameras (NFC).

To study GRBs, it is of the utmost importance to perform prompt optical follow-up observations to detect longer wavelength transient emission associated to the GRBs; BOOTES can perform such follow ups. Its scientific objectives include:

- Simultaneous and quasi-simultaneous observations of GRB error boxes.
- Detection of optical flashes of cosmic origin.
- All-sky monitoring with the CASANDRA cameras down to 10th magnitude every 60 seconds.
- Monitoring of different types of variable objects (galactic or extragalactic) down to 20th magnitude in order to search for optical variability.
- Discovery of comets, meteors, asteroids, variable stars, novae and supernovae.

Its principal investigator is Prof. Alberto J. Castro-Tirado (IAA-CSIC and UMA), who conceived the project at the time of his PhD. studies in Denmark in 1993 and started the deployment of BOOTES in 1998, with the support of the Instituto Nacional de Tecnica Aeroespacial (INTA) within the framework of an international collaboration led by Spain, in order to support the European Space Agency satellite INTEGRAL with ground-based observations. The project also focused on performing rapid follow up observations of events detected by several spacecraft (BATSE, BeppoSAX, RossiXTE, IPN, Hete-2, Swift, and Fermi). Results in the GRB field are multifold:

- Pre-detection images: BOOTES sets up upper limits for any possible precursors.
- Simultaneous images: The first was achieved by BOOTES on February 20, 2001, but no counterpart was detected.
- Follow-up images: Images detected with several gamma-ray bursts being discovered or monitored starting several dozens of seconds after the onset of the event.

== BOOTES sites ==
- BOOTES-1 – El Arenosillo, Spain – 37°06′16″N 06°43′58″W.
- BOOTES-2 – Instituto de Hortofruticultura Subtropical y Mediterránea La Mayora, Algarrobo Costa, Spain – 36°45′33″N 04°02′27″W. The 0.6m telescope is named "TELMA" (TELescope MAlaga) following the nearby town of Málaga in southern Spain.
- BOOTES-3 – National Institute of Water and Atmospheric Research, Lauder, New Zealand – 45°03′13″S 169°40′24″E. The 0.6m telescope is named "Yock-Allen Telescope" (YAT) in honour of both the kiwi astrophysicist Phil A. Yock (b. in 1940) and the kiwi engineer William H. Allen (b. in 1939).
- BOOTES-4 – Yunnan Astronomical Observatory, Lijiang, China -26°41′43″N 100°01′47″E. The 0.6m telescope is named "María Eva Telescope" (MET) in honor of the Spanish lady María Eva Alcoholado Feltström (b. in 1967).
- BOOTES-5 – Observatorio Astronómico Nacional en la Sierra de San Pedro Mártir, Mexico 31°02′39″N 115°27′49″W. The 0.6m telescope is named "Javier Gorosabel Telescope" (JGT) in memory of the Spanish astrophysicist Javier Gorosabel Urkia (1969–2015).
- BOOTES-6 – Boyden Observatory, South Africa - 29°02′20″S 26°24′20″E. The 0.6m telescope is named "Dolores Pérez-Ramírez Telescope" (DPRT) in memory of the Spanish astrophysicist Dolores Pérez-Ramírez (1968–2015).
- BOOTES-7 – San Pedro de Atacama Space Observatory, Chile - 22°57′09″S 68°10′49″W.
