= INTA-100 =

Piece of meteorological equipment

- Manufacturer: INTA
- Country of origin: Spain

Size
- Height: 4 m
- Diameter: 10 cm
- Mass: 70 kg
- Stages: 2

Capacity

Payload to Suborbital
- Altitude: 115 km
- Mass: 6 kg (13 lb)

Associated rockets
- Derivative work: INTA-255, INTA-300

Launch history
- Status: Retired
- Launch sites: El Arenosillo
- Total launches: 17
- Success(es): 15
- Failure: 2

The INTA-100 vehicle was a small 2-stage meteorological sounding rocket designed and developed between the 1980s and the 1990s by the Instituto Nacional de Técnica Aeroespacial (INTA). The final design was entirely produced in Spain to be used by the Instituto Nacional de Meteorología (INM now part of the AEMET) in conducting experiments on the atmosphere.

== Body ==
The rocket was a small cylindrical rod 4 meters in length and 10 cm of diameter and a total weight of 70 kg. It was divided into two sections: 1st stage (codename INTA S-12) and the 2nd stage (codename Urbión in reference to the Iberian peaks of the same name) each with its own stabilizing fins. This configuration allowed up to 6 kg of payload with a flight apoapsis of 115 km.

== Development ==
The INTA 100 sounding rocket project was initiated in 1980. With help from the British company Bristol Aerojet, the first launch took place in June 1984, with six additional launches performed by 1986. The main drive behind these test was to further develop and improve rocket engines and their guidance system. With one notable exception, all test were highly successful in helping develop a hybrid inertial/infrared guidance system that would later be used in several of INTA's satellites (such as the Minisat 01 ETRV and the Nanosat 01 ACS). The 5 following test would focus on geodesic studies such as reception of ionospheric beacons emitted by satellites and atmosphere dynamics. To fund these missions INTA reached for several, both public and private, investors such as the Spanish Air Force, the University of Valencia, the University of Sussex, DFVLR, IROE and most important the Comisión Nacional de Investigación del Espacio (CONIE). The later completely funded 2 launches and quickly became INTA's main partner also participating in balloon launches and the funding of infrastructure.

As a consequence of the closure of CONIE in 1986, the INTA-100 project was put on hold for 4 years due to the lack of funds. Nonetheless, by 1990 the situation was good enough to resume work on the rocket producing 6 more rockets that would be complete testing by 1992. These test would prove successful enough to encourage the development of the INTA rocket series that would culminate on the Capricornio. In addition, INTA would be given funds to develop more ambitious projects such as the first Spanish satellites (Intasat and Minisat 01) that would pave the way for INTA to join ESA and reach the current involvement on the space industry.

== Launches ==
During its career 12 rockets were built and used in a total of 17 missions (15 of them successfully) from El Arenosillo, most of them to conduct various test on either the rocket or its payload.

Date	Codename	Purpose	Results
11 June 1984	INTA MZ-8401	Test, Zorzal 1, Mock-up	Success
12 June 1984	INTA MZ-8402	Test, Zorzal 2, Mock-up	Success
13 June 1984	INTA RP-8401	Ballast, Rocío 1	Success
27 March 1985	INTA RP-8501	Ballast, Rocío 2	Success
18 June 1985	INTA RP-8502	Ballast, Rocío 3	Failure
24 June 1985	INTA RP-8503	Ballast, Rocío 4	Success
13 November 1985	INTA RP-8504	Ballast, Rocío 5	Success
15 November 1985	INTA RP-8505	Chaff, Rocío 6	Success
17 October 1990	INTA MZ-9001	Test, M0, Mock-up	Success
21 October 1990	INTA MZ-9002	Test, M1, functioning mock-up	Success
22 October 1990	INTA MZ-9003	Test, M2, functioning mock-up	Success
18 January 1991	INTA RP-9101	Test, Rocío 7, Prototype	Success
18 January 1991	INTA RP-9102	Meteo, Rocío 8, Prototype	Failure
14 October 1991	INTA RP-9103	Test, Rocío 9,	Success
15 October 1991	INTA RP-9104	Test, Rocío 10	Success
7 April 1992	INTA RP-9201	Tech Payload, Rocío 11	Success
8 April 1992	INTA RP-9202	Tech Payload, Rocío 12	Success

== See also ==
The family of sounding rockets developed from the INTA-100:

- INTA 255
- INTA 300
