= Gando Air Base =

Spanish Air and Space Force base

Coordinates: 27.936°N 15.379°W

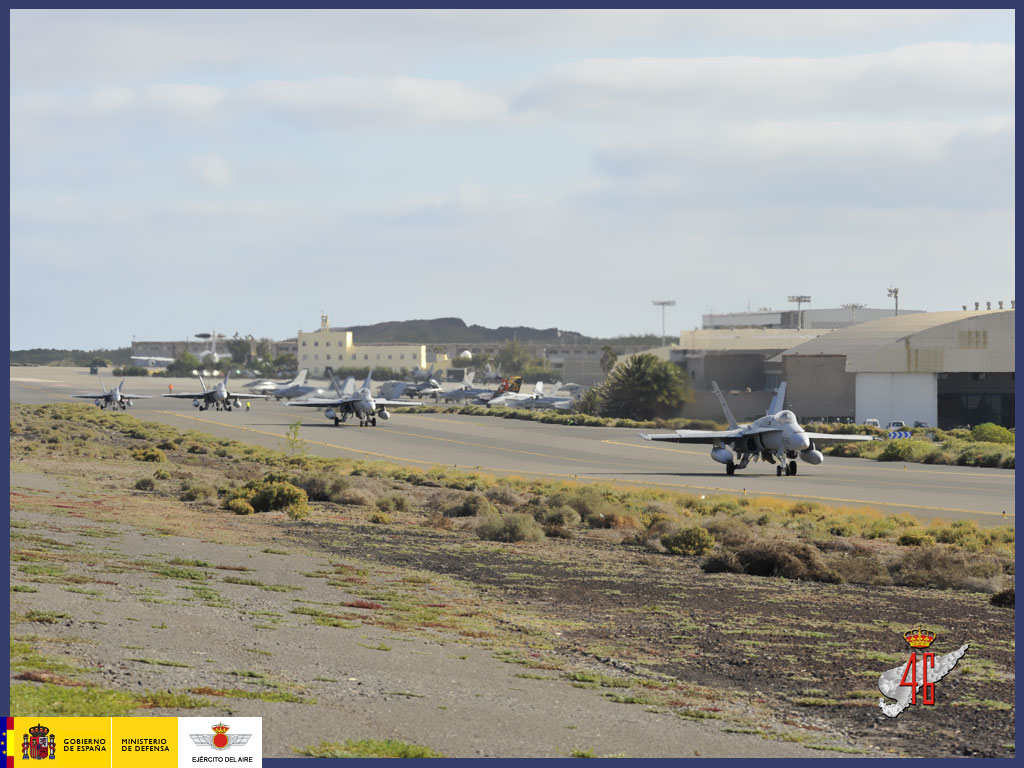
Spanish F/A-18 Hornet at the Gando Air Base in 2016.

The Gando Air Base (in Spanish: Base Aérea de Gando) is a base of the Spanish Air and Space Force located on the Gran Canaria island, Spain, and next to the Gran Canaria Airport, eastward from its runways.

Beyond several hangars opposite to the passenger terminal, the Gando Air Base contains ten shelters situated on the southern end of the eastern runway. They harbor the 46 Wing (Ala 46) which operates F/A-18A+ Hornet by 462 Esc and CASA/IPTN CN235 aircraft, and the SAR Eurocopter H215M. The 46 Wing is composed of the 462 fighter (ca. 18 F/A18A+‘s) and 802 rescue and transport squadron (3 CN235-100MSA and 4 H215M Cougar) and it defends the Spanish airspace around the Canary Islands. The 46th Wing is to convert from the F-18 Hornet to the Eurofighter Typhoon starting in 2026. The Gando Air Base is one of the biggest and most important air bases of the Spanish Air and Space Force and it is unique because of the wide variety of aircraft which it operates.

Military activity was most intense during the mid-1970s, at the time of the crisis of decolonisation of Western Sahara and its occupation by Morocco. Military crises in Western Africa, like the 2013 Mali intervention by France, made Gando Air Base the main air platform for operations in Western Africa area by NATO. In 2006 Spain proposed Gando Air Base as headquarters for the newly created United States Africa Command (AFRICOM), but the AFRICOM HQ was ultimately based in Stuttgart, Germany.

The Canary Islands Air Command (Mando Aéreo de Canarias – MACAN) is based in the city of Las Palmas. Canary Islands Air Command is the only territorial general Air Force Command in Spain; its mission is the maintenance, preparation and command of air units located in the Canary archipelago. Any Spanish military airplane that lands in the Canary Islands is immediately put at the disposal of the Canary Islands Air Command, who can retain it and use it as long as necessary for missions within the islands. This happens sometimes with heavy military transport, antisubmarine warfare and early warning airplanes, since the islands do not have these on a permanent basis. Once the plane is released by the Canary Islands Air Command, it can leave the Canary Islands and it reverts to the Air Force Commands of mainland Spain.

The deployment base of Gando Air Base is the Lanzarote Military Airfield (Aeródromo Militar de Lanzarote). Lanzarote Military Airfield has its own permanent Air Force troops platoons and an air defence radar (the EVA 22, which covers the Eastern Canary Islands and the maritime area up to the Sahara), but it has no permanently based military planes, using the ones from Gando.

== Space launch operations ==
In 1997, Gando Air Base was used to launch the Minisat 01 satellite and it was proposed as an alternative to El Hierro Launch Centre.

== See also ==
- Military of the Canary Islands
- Structure of the Spanish Air and Space Force
