= INTA-255 =

- Manufacturer: INTA
- Country of origin: Spain

Size
- Height: 6.03 m
- Diameter: 26 cm
- Mass: 340 kg
- Stages: 2

Capacity

Payload to Suborbital
- Altitude: 150 km
- Mass: 15 kg (33 lb)

Associated rockets
- Derivative work: INTA-300

Launch history
- Status: Retired
- Launch sites: El Arenosillo
- Total launches: 3
- Success(es): 3
- Failure: 0

The INTA-255 was a Spanish sounding rocket developed by the Instituto Nacional de Tecnica Aerospacial.

== History ==
It was based on existing british solid rocket motors: four Chick rockets as a booster stage and a single Goose-2 as stage 1. All the engines were fired at launch, with the Chicks burning for 0.2 seconds and the Goose-2 continuing for 17 seconds.

The apogee of INTA-255 was 150 km for a 5 kg payload, the takeoff thrust 42.00 kN, the gross mass 340 kg, the diameter 0.26 m and the length to 6.03 m.

== Launches ==
The INTA-255 was launched by INTA three times from El Arenosillo, between 1969 and 1970.

Date	Mission type	Apogee
July 19, 1969	Booster test	1 km
December 20, 1969	Test mission	73 km
December 22, 1969	Test mission	132 km

== See also ==
- INTA-300
- INTA-100
- Capricornio (rocket)
- Miura 1
