= Fulmar (rocket) =

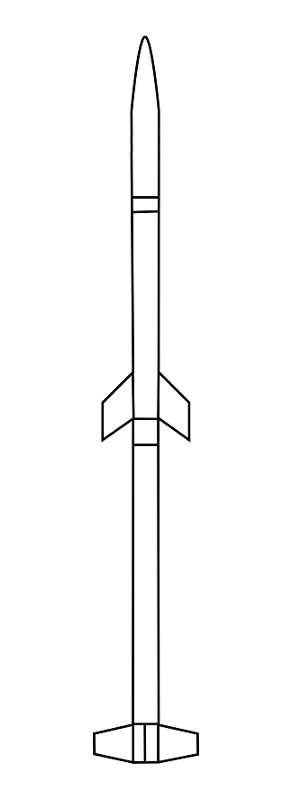
- Fulmar sounding rocket
- Country of origin: Great Britain

Size
- Height: 7.47 m (24.5 ft)
- Diameter: 0.26 m (0.85 ft)
- Stages: 2

Capacity

Payload to Suborbital
- Altitude: 250 km (160 mi)

Launch history
- Status: Retired
- Launch sites: Andoya
- Total launches: 6
- First flight: November 21, 1976
- Last flight: March 19, 1979

First stage – Heron
- Maximum thrust: 107 kN (24,000 lbf)

Second stage – Snipe
- Maximum thrust: 16.7 kN (3,800 lbf)

The Fulmar was a two-stage British sounding rocket. It was related to the Spanish INTA-300.It was a part of cold-war era scientific research rockets. It was used to conduct studies of the upper atmosphere, Ionosphere and auroras.

The Fulmar, developed by Bristol Aerojet, consisted of a Heron starting stage with 107 kN thrust and a Snipe upper stage with 16.7 kN thrust. The Fulmar had a diameter of 26 centimetres and a length of 7.47 metres. It weighed 500 kilograms at launch and could reach a height of 250 kilometres.

== Launches ==
The Fulmar was fired six times between 1976 and 1979 at Andøya in Norway; the last launch, on 19 March 1979, failed.

Date	Site	Vehicle	Apogee (km)	Mission	Result
1976 November 21	Andøya	F2	137	auroral mission	Success
1976 December 11	Andøya	F5	214	aurora / aeronomy / ionosphere mission	Success
1977 October 16	Andøya	F3	247	"Wind / T" atmospheric mission	Success
1977 November 17	Andøya	F1	261	"Electrons / Ions" ionosphere mission	Success
1977 December 5	Andøya	F4	255	"HLC 2B" auroral mission	Success
1979 March 19	Andøya	F6	15	aeronomy mission	Failure
