= Delft Aerospace Rocket Engineering =

Dutch student rocketry society

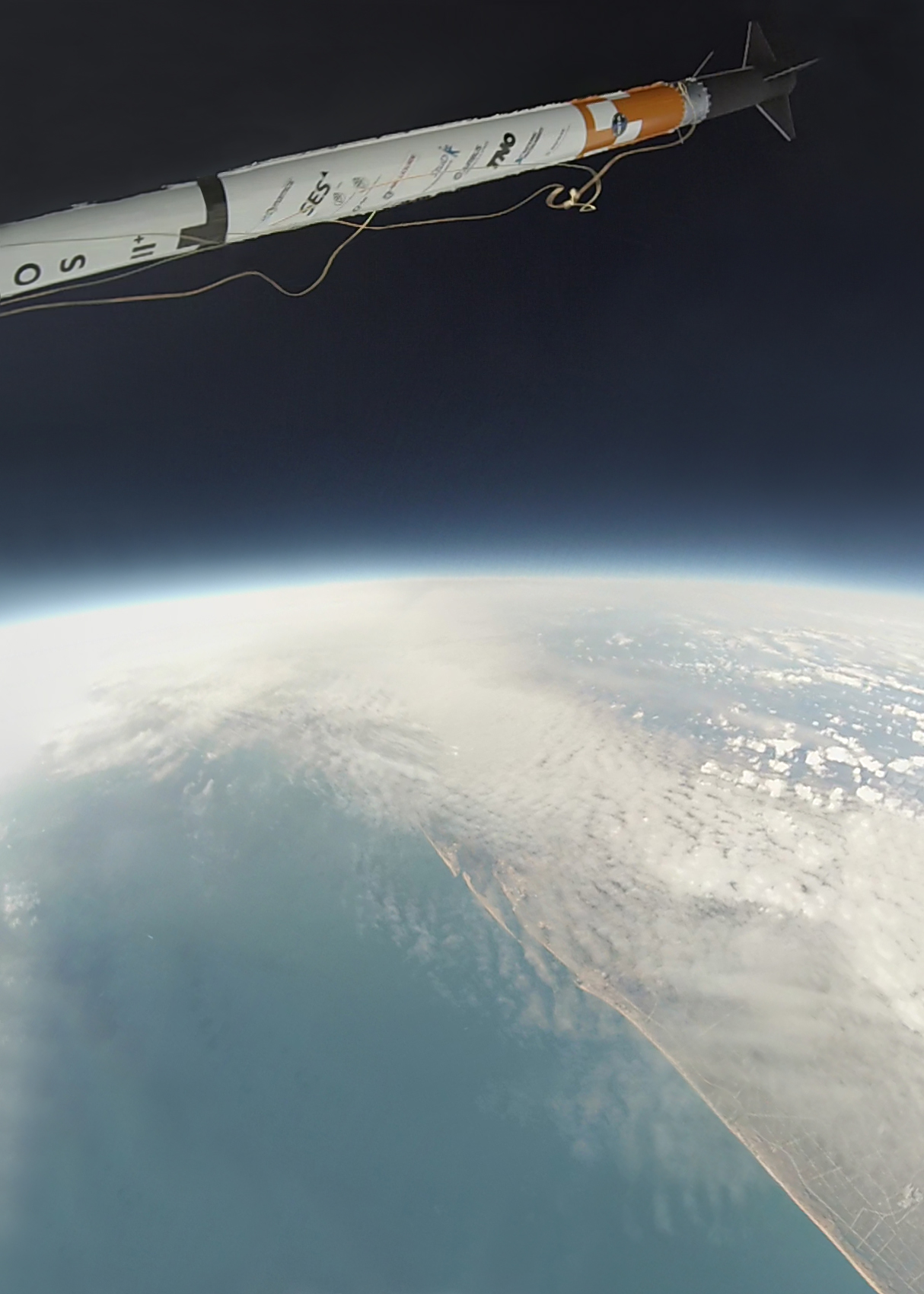
- Launch of the Stratos II+ rocket in 2015.
- Trade name: DARE
- Type: Student Team / Nonprofit
- Industry: Aerospace
- Founded: 2001
- Headquarters: Delft, Netherlands; 51°59′58.5″N 4°22′35″E
- Products: Stratos IV; Stratos V; Aether; CanSat Launcher V7; Firebolt (Project Sparrow)
- Services: Suborbital rocket launch, Research and Development
- Members: Est. 190+ (2020)
- Website: dare.tudelft.nl

Delft Aerospace Rocket Engineering (abbreviated "DARE") is a student-run society within Delft University of Technology with over 200 members. The main focus of the student group is the development of rocket technology on a non-profit basis. All development, from engines to electronics, is done in-house. Although several projects take place in DARE, the group's two flagship projects are Stratos and Project Sparrow. Stratos includes the Stratos I rocket which was launched in 2009 and set the European altitude record for amateur rocketry at 12.5 km. The follow-up of this rocket was the Stratos II+, which was launched on 16 October 2015, reaching an altitude of 21.5 km and setting a new record. In summer of 2018, Stratos III was launched, disintegrating 20 seconds after the launch. Its successor, Stratos IV, was set to launch to 100 km, but never did due to ground systems failures during the launch campaign. Project Sparrow successfully developed a LOX/Ethanol, regeneratively cooled engine, and Stratos V, the latest flagship project, is building a reusable rocket around it. Even though DARE cooperates with the military to safely conduct launch campaigns, DARE's technology is strictly non-military. Approximately 70 percent of members come from the Faculty of Aerospace Engineering of Delft University of Technology, with the remaining 30% coming from other faculties, including Mechanical Engineering, Electrical Engineering, Applied Physics and Industrial Design. DARE also features a very high number of international students, with about half of the students coming from outside the Netherlands.

DARE alumni have pursued careers across the aerospace industry, joining established companies and founding new ventures such as Dawn Aerospace and T-Minus. As a result, the society has developed a strong reputation for cultivating highly capable engineers, whose practical experience often exceeds that of their peers in traditional academic settings.

== History ==
DARE was founded in 2001 by six students as a committee of the study association VSV Leonardo da Vinci of the Faculty of Aerospace Engineering on the TU Delft. The number of members has increased to over 190 in 2020. Over the years DARE has developed expertise in all three major rocket propulsion technologies (solid, liquid, and hybrid), with multiple conference papers published each year. 2009 marked DARE's Stratos I launch, which set the European altitude record of 12.5 km for student rockets. Afterwards, the development of Hybrid rocket engines was started, resulting in the 8 kN DHX-200 Aurora. This engine powered Stratos II, which after a failed launch campaign in 2014 broke the European altitude record for student rocketry in 2015.

== Launches ==
DARE typically conducts two to four launch days each year for small scale rockets that go up to a maximum of two kilometers altitude. These launches take place on a military site near 't Harde in the North of the Netherlands. To go to higher altitudes, DARE occasionally participates in launch campaigns elsewhere in Europe.

== Facilities ==
The work of DARE takes place at two locations at the TU Delft campus. The first is a manufacturing-orientated workshop in the faculty of Aerospace Engineering's Aircraft Hall. Here, the major parts of rocket production take place, from machining of metallic parts to soldering electronics boards. The other location is the Science Center Delft, where meetings and lectures from more experienced members take place.

== Projects ==
DARE has a number of teams working on specific areas of rocket technology, logistics, promotion and sponsor acquisition.

=== Solid Propulsion ===
Most rockets of DARE run on solid propellant engines, which are developed and built by the Solid Six team and the Safety Board. The propellants used is either a mixture of sorbitol and potassium nitrate, known as rocket candy, or a mixture of Ammonium Nitrate and Aluminium called Alan-7. The scale of the developed engines ranges from 300 N up to 7000 N.

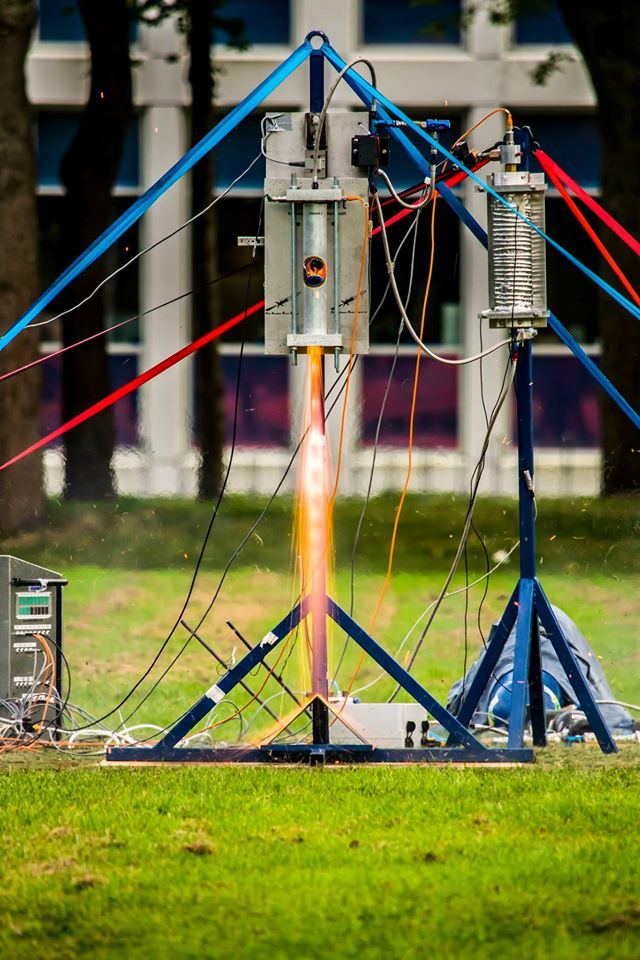
Testing of the "Phoenix" hybrid rocket engine by DARE

=== Hybrid Propulsion ===
After the launch of Stratos I, research to Hybrid rocket engines started within DARE. After extensive theoretical research, small scale testing (ranging from 500 to 1100 N) commenced to gain experience with the system and to select the optimal engine configuration. The selected fuel was a mixture of Sorbitol, Paraffin and Aluminium, combined with Nitrous Oxide as oxidizer. This work has resulted in several publications in several different journals including the journal of the American Institute of Aeronautics and Astronautics. Scaled-up versions of this engine are used to power Stratos II+ and III, the flagship projects of DARE.

Currently hybrid propulsion development within DARE is performed by Project Chimera.

=== Liquid Propulsion ===
While currently all large-scale engines developed by DARE are Nitrous Oxide - based Hybrid engines, logistics and manufacturing prevents this type of engine to be scaled up much further. For this reason, the development of LOX - Ethanol Liquid rocket engines is tackled within DARE. Past liquid engine developments have failed for a variety of reasons, but most prominently due to the mechanical complexity of this type of propulsion. The Cryogenic Engine Development subdivision of DARE aims to produce a 2-3 kN engine, to acquire the knowledge required for the society to tap into the technology. A future plan for this engine is potentially powering future Stratos missions.

=== Advanced Control Team ===
All DARE rockets are passively stabilised, with fin size and -location balanced such that the rocket turns into the wind once it clears the tower. As a consequence, medium to high crosswinds can severely limit the altitude a rocket can achieve. The Advanced Control Team is developing technology to actively stabilize the rocket during ascend.

=== Electronics ===
All PCB's and software are custom-made and developed in-house within DARE. They are used to deploy parachutes, control engines, and transmit radio data during and after launch.

=== SRP (Small Rocket Project) ===
The Small Rocket Project (colloquially known as the Scrambled Eggs Competition) is DARE's program to introduce first year members and other interested students to the basic principles of hands-on rocketry. The aim of the project is to launch a rocket to an altitude of 1 km with an uncooked egg on board and returning this egg intact. To help students achieve this goal the project starts out with several lectures explaining the fundamentals of rocketry, rocket stability and the design of parachutes. These lectures are given by senior DARE members, who are also mentors that advise and guide the groups during the project. The groups are largely free in their designs, although every rocket has to pass a final safety check, and the solid rocket motors for the rockets are provided by DARE. The project concludes with a launch day at a military testing range, where each design is put to the test.

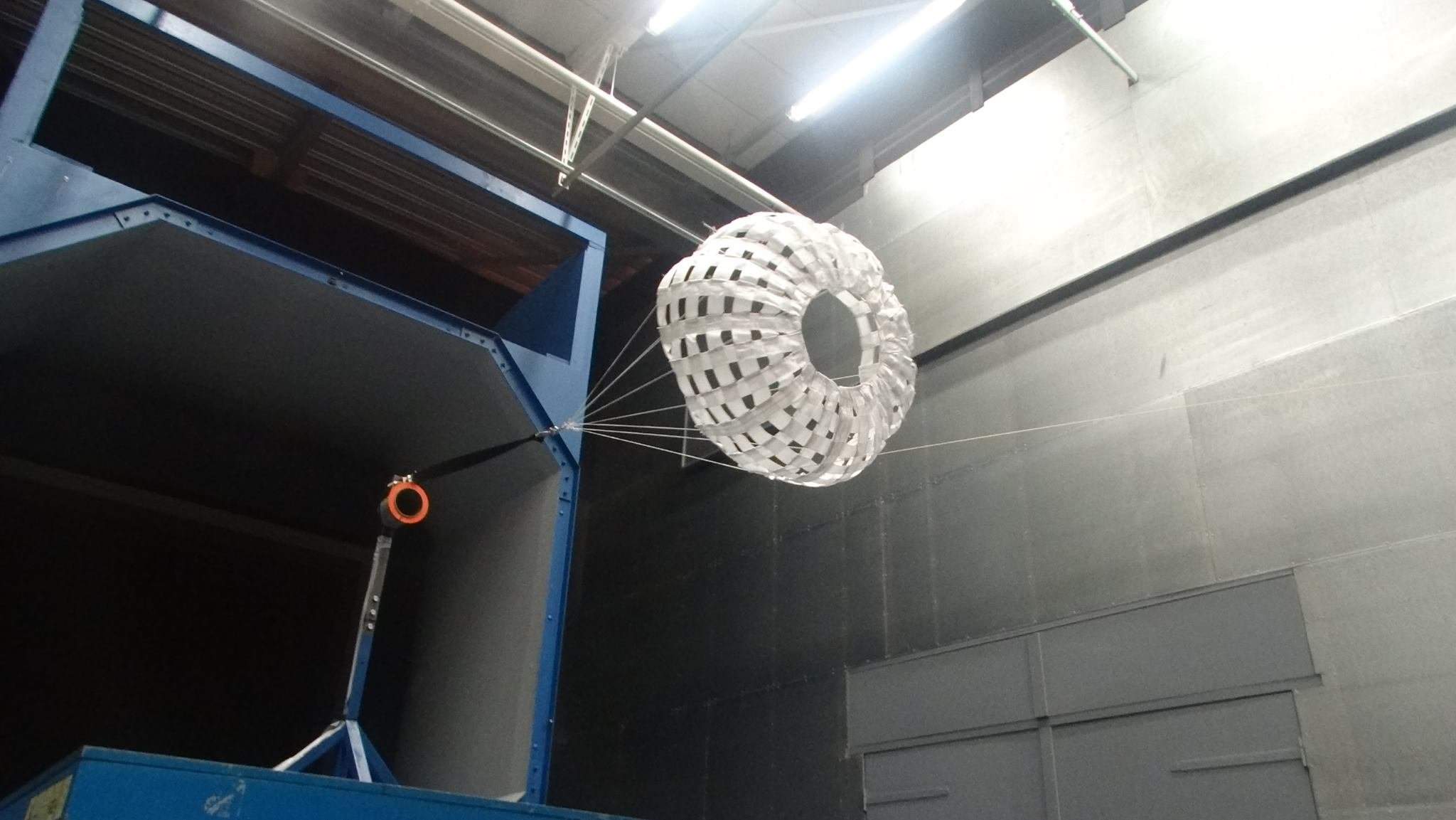
Testing of a drogue parachute by DARE in the Open Jet Facility of TU Delft

=== Cansat ===
DARE is also actively involved in providing the launch service for the Dutch CanSat project. In particular, DARE develops, produces, tests, and launches the CanSat launchers (CSL). Over the years these launcher have undergone several development iterations, balancing reliability, producibility, and payload capacity. The current CSL Version 7 consists of an all-Aluminium frame and, propelled by a solid rocket motor, can lift about five to six CanSats to an altitude of one kilometer. The CSL V7 has recently been used as a flying testbed to test new technologies developed by DARE.

=== Aether ===
In 2015, the Aether project was kicked off. It focusses on demonstrating several new technologies developed within DARE, that can later on be implemented in larger projects. It includes:

- Active canard stabilization suitable for transonic flight
- A 7 kN Solid engine
- An advanced ballistic parachute deployment mechanism, as was found required by the Stratos II+ launch campaign

=== Safety Board ===
The Safety Board does not actively develop rockets, but consists of experienced DARE members, that can join the Safety Board after a minimum of one-year training. The Safety Board oversees testing done in DARE, checks rockets prior to launch, and is responsible for all safety-related elements of DARE's work. The Safety Board can overrule any safety-related decision.

=== Project Sparrow ===
Project Sparrow is DARE's latest initiative to develop the society's first liquid-propelled, thrust-vectoring rocket, named Firebolt. The engine will provide the necessary power and control to propel rockets beyond the 100 km Kármán line by using a LOX–ethanol propellant system. As the successor to the hybrid-powered Nimbus engine used in the DARE Stratos IV rocket, Firebolt will power DARE's next generation of high-performance vehicles and serve as the first step toward placing a student-designed rocket into Earth orbit.

Project Sparrow will eventually develop a flight-ready engine, which could be integrated by DARE into a sounding rocket; the sounding rocket will also be a testbed for validating rocket dynamics with the thrust-vectoring engine. The rocket eventually will incorporate staging and recovery systems.

== Stratos ==
=== Stratos I ===
Stratos I set the record for the highest altitude achieved by a student rocket, at 12.5 km. It was launched from Esrange in Sweden in 2009. It was a two-staged solid rocket, powered by boosters developed and built within DARE. After a successful ascent, the parachutes failed to deploy and both stages crashed. The achieved altitude and the crash location could be gathered from the launch range equipment, making it possible to retrieve the second stage after the launch. The first stage was only accidentally found back 8 years later, during a routine check of the launch site.

=== Stratos II/II+ ===
Stratos II+
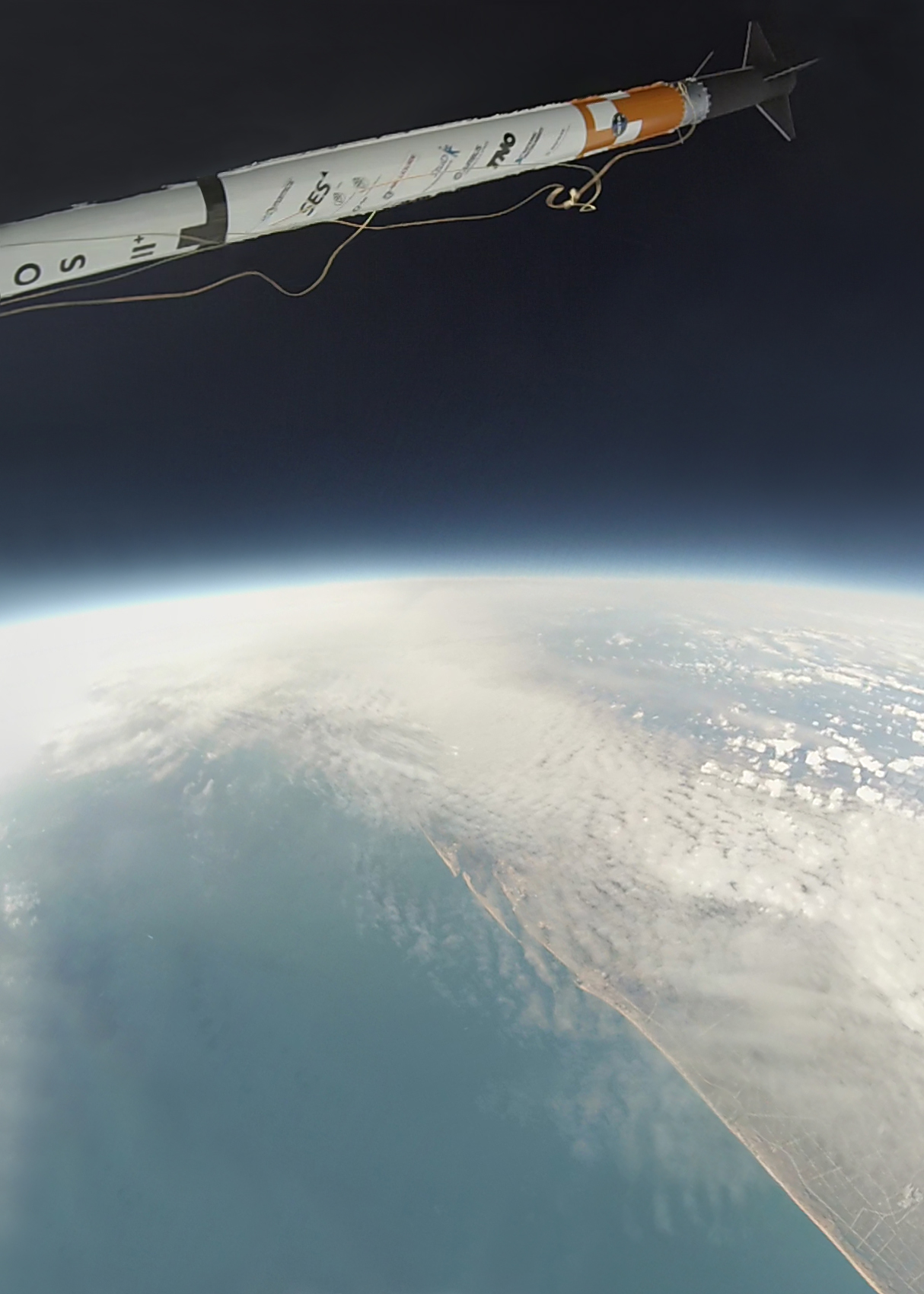
- Picture taken by Stratos II+ at its apogee.
- Function: Sounding Rocket
- Manufacturer: DARE
- Country of origin: Netherlands

Size
- Height: 6.9 m (23 ft)
- Diameter: 20 cm (7.9 in)
- Mass: 185 kg (408 lb)
- Stages: 1

Launch history
- Launch sites: El Arenosillo

Boosters – DHX-200 Aurora
- Maximum thrust: 11 kN (peak)
- Specific impulse: 205 s
- Burn time: 23
- Propellant: Sorbitol, Paraffin, Aluminium / Nitrous oxide

The Stratos II+ rocket was DARE's biggest undertaking and originally aimed to reach 50 km. However after design changes and updated simulations it became unlikely that this altitude could be reached. Stratos II+ was successfully launched on 16 October 2015 from El Arenosillo of Instituto Nacional de Técnica Aeroespacial, close to the city of Sevilla in Spain. It reached an altitude of 21.5 km, with which it broke the previous record for student rocketry. The rocket was initially known as the Stratos II but failed to launch in October 2014. Design improvements were made after which the rocket was named Stratos II+.

Stratos II+ was powered by a single-stage hybrid engine, the DHX-200 Aurora which has a peak output of 11 kN. The engine has a total impulse of 180 kNs and burns for approximately 23 seconds. After this the engine is cut and the rocket continued on coast to its apogee. Stratos II+ carried several scientific payloads on board to do measurements in the higher atmosphere. Among these are an experiment on radio astronomy from the Radboud University Nijmegen, a camera system with video link from the company DelftDynamics and a geiger counter from the Hungarian Academy of Sciences' Centre for Energy research.

An overview of the launch attempts of Stratos II and II+ is shown in the table below.

Attempt	Planned	Result	Turnaround	Reason	Decision point	Weather go (%)	Notes
1	1 Oct 2014, 11:00:00 am	scrubbed	—	Weather			
2	2 Oct 2014, 6:15:00 pm	scrubbed	1 day 7 hours 15 minutes	Flight Termination System failure	(T-1:20)		
3	3 Oct 2014, 3:15:00 pm	scrubbed	0 days 21 hours 0 minutes	Main oxidizer valve stuck as by-effect of leaking N2O from the feed system	(T-0:01)		
4	15 Oct 2015, 4:00:00 pm	scrubbed	377 days 0 hours 45 minutes	Igniter valve did not open resulting in failed ignition		100	
5	16 Oct 2015, 4:33:00 pm	success	1 day 0 hours 33 minutes	-		100	Apogee altitude of 21.5 km

=== Stratos III ===
Stratos III
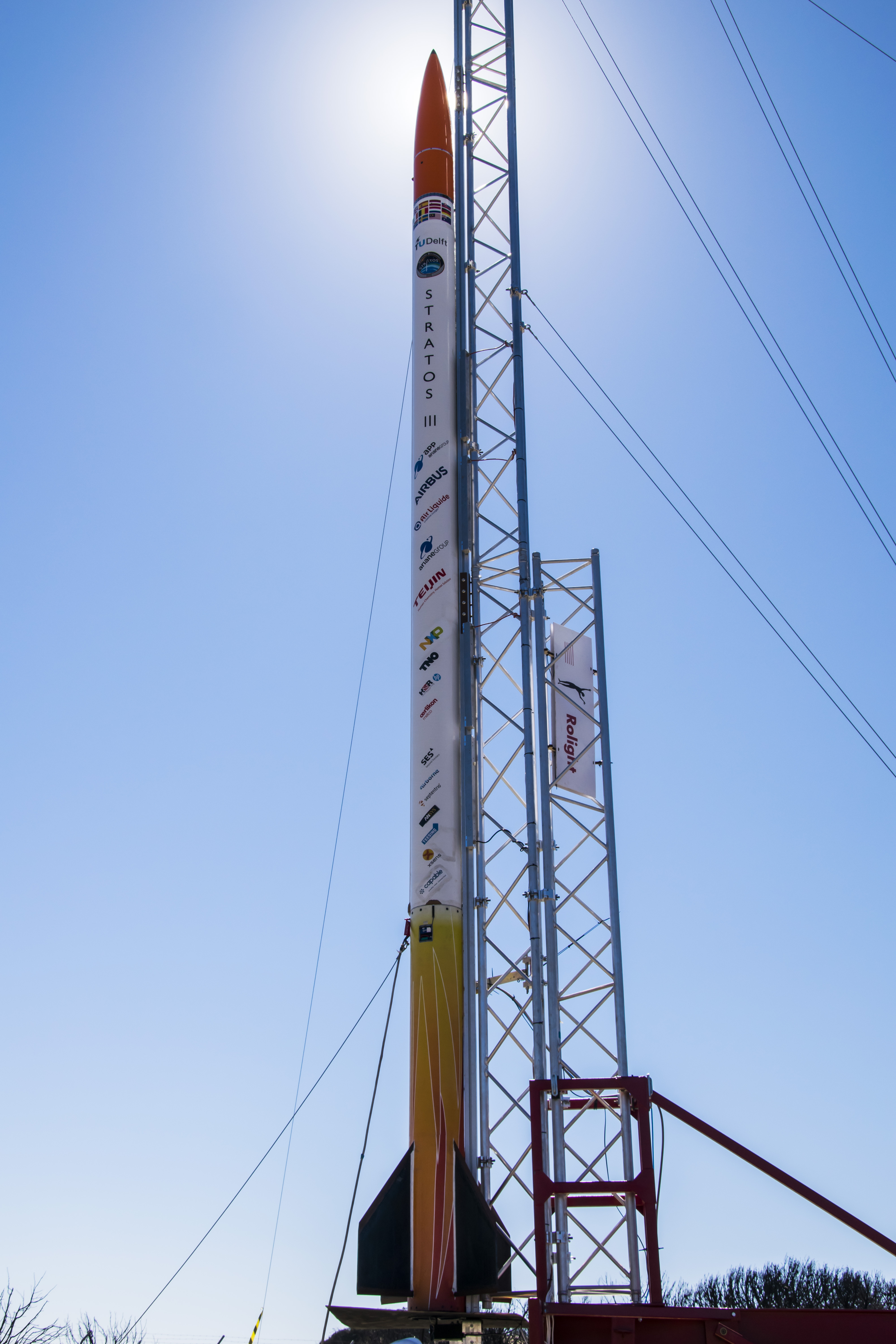
- Stratos III just before lift-off.
- Function: Sounding Rocket
- Manufacturer: DARE
- Country of origin: Netherlands

Size
- Height: 8.2 m (27 ft)
- Diameter: 28 cm (11 in)
- Mass: 330 kg (730 lb)
- Stages: 1

Launch history
- Launch sites: El Arenosillo

Boosters – DHX-400 Nimbus
- Maximum thrust: 25 kN (peak)
- Specific impulse: 179 s
- Propellant: Sorbitol, Paraffin, Aluminium / Nitrous oxide

Stratos III is an expendable sounding rocket developed by DARE. The project started in 2016 as a successor of the Stratos II+ mission with the purpose of reclaiming the European altitude record for student rocketry, currently owned by the German team HyEnD.

The Stratos III rocket is 8.2 m tall and is powered by the DHX-400 Nimbus, a 360 kNs impulse hybrid rocket engine. The DHX-400 Nimbus utilizes nitrous oxide as its oxidizer and a mixture of paraffin, sorbitol and aluminum powder for the fuel. The oxidizer tank is made out of carbon fiber with an aluminium liner and is capable of storing 174 kg of nitrous oxide at a pressure of 60 bar. The DHX-400 is the most powerful amateur built hybrid engine in the world, with a peak thrust of 25 kN.

The rocket carries a scientific payload from NLR, which is a prototype IMU for the proposed future European SMILE launcher. Additionally Stratos III has full 360 degree live stream downlink.

At apogee, the nosecone with payload separates from the oxidizer tank and propulsion system. After this a parachute deployment device opens a drogue parachute and main parachute to ensure a safe landing of 13 m/s in the Atlantic Ocean. After this, the nosecone is recovered by a boat. Stratos III is launched from El Arenosillo, similar to Stratos II+. The launch window opens at July 16, 2018 and closes at July 27, 2018. An overview of the launch attempts is shown in the table below.

Attempt	Planned	Result	Turnaround	Reason	Decision point	Weather go (%)	Notes
1	24 Jul 2018, 9:00:00 pm	cancelled	—	winds too strong	(T-2:50)	25	
2	26 Jul 2018, 3:30:00 am	failure	1 day 6 hours 30 minutes	loss of vehicle 20 seconds into the flight	(T+0:20)	100	

The second launch attempt was initially scheduled for July 25 at 11 PM CEST. However, with a 100% weather-GO, a significant delay occurred when pressurizing the nitrous oxide tank. This led to the launch being delayed to July 26 3:30 AM. After a successful launch, an anomaly occurred 20 seconds into the flight, resulting in a loss of the vehicle.

=== Stratos IV ===
Stratos IV
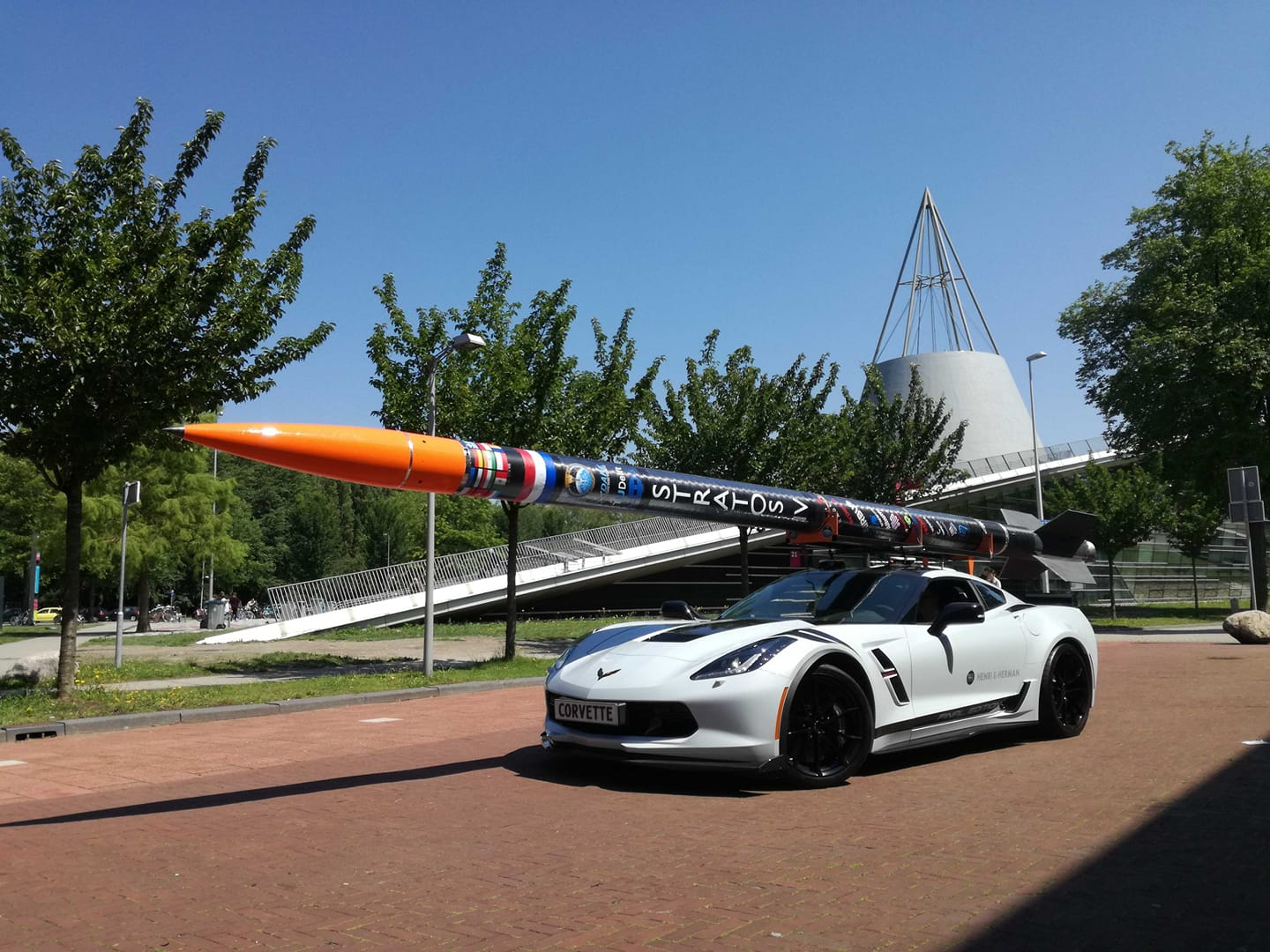
- Stratos IV rocket on Corvette C7 car during the unveil event.
- Function: Sounding Rocket
- Manufacturer: DARE
- Country of origin: Netherlands

Size
- Height: 8.3 m (27 ft)
- Diameter: 28 cm (11 in)
- Mass: 320 kg (710 lb)
- Stages: 1

Boosters – DHX-400 Nimbus
- Maximum thrust: 26 kN (peak)
- Specific impulse: 179 s
- Propellant: Sorbitol, Paraffin, Aluminium / Nitrous oxide

After the in-flight disintegration of Stratos III, an investigation was begun to determine the cause of the vehicles demise. The team behind the investigation consisted of members of the Stratos III team as well as the newly formed Stratos IV team. The main sources of information were the telemetry streamed back from the vehicle during its 20 seconds of flight (giving data from the two IMUs onboard as well as the GPS receiver and pressure sensors), as well as the ground measurements taken using radar and Doppler. These sources allowed the team to piece together a picture of the path Stratos III followed during its flight. From this data it was concluded that the vehicle underwent a phenomenon known as roll-pitch coupling, or inertia coupling. This occurs when the vehicles roll rate matches the natural pitch frequency of the vehicle. This causes the vehicle to move in a conical motion rather than a linear motion, and when the two frequencies couple, the vehicle becomes unstable and diverges from its flight path, causing it to break up.

When the goal of Stratos IV was considered, the engine performance/vehicle mass combination of Stratos III bore a large influence. This combination was seen to give simulated apogees approaching 100 km, or the Karman line. As reaching this altitude is the long term goal of the Stratos project, it was decided to iterate upon the design of Stratos III. Thus the Stratos IV project is focusing on minimizing the mass of the vehicle, while keeping the internal engine geometry, which took three years to develop, fixed. The design of Stratos IV was unveiled on February 12, 2019.

The design changes in comparison to Stratos III are:

- Weight saving
  - Composite Combustion Chamber (6 kg lighter than the aluminium equivalent)
  - Twaron Nosecone (2 kg lighter than the glass fibre equivalent)
  - 3D Printed Titanium Nozzle (12 kg lighter than the fully graphite equivalent)
- Roll-Pitch Coupling Mitigation
  - Conical Interfaces between Modules (More rigid than the previous flat interfaces)
  - Engine Bay Shell (More rigid than the longeron version, with improved accessibility)
  - Larger Fins (More consistent static margin during flight)
  - Roll Control Module using Nitrous Oxide Propellant Thrusters
- Varia
  - 5 Cameras (Four radial, one downward facing, and one looking through the recovery plate to view tank separation and parachute deployment)
  - Hot Gas Deployment Device (Fewer components, thus higher reliability than the cold gas equivalent)

The Stratos IV launch campaign was held in late 2021 at the El Arenosillo Test center. After technical issues on several attempts, the rocket was not launched and the campaign ended.
