= Capricornio (rocket) =

Spanish orbital launch vehicle

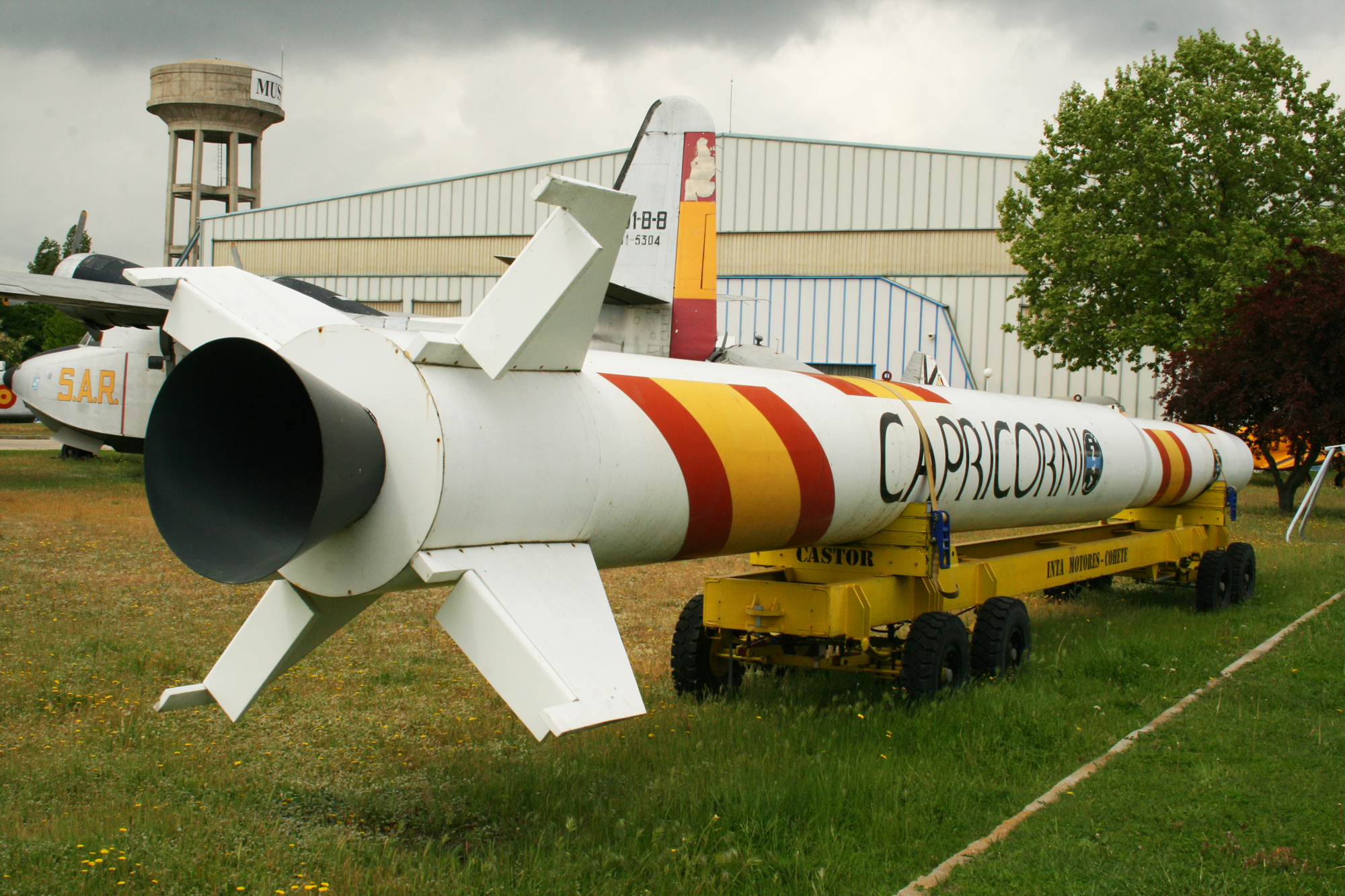
- Function: Orbital launch vehicle
- Manufacturer: Instituto Nacional de Técnica Aeroespacial (INTA)
- Country of origin: Spain

Size
- Height: 18.25 m (59.9 ft)
- Diameter: 1.00 m (3.28 ft)
- Mass: 15,035 kg (33,147 lb)
- Stages: 3

Capacity

Payload to LEO
- Mass: 140 kg (310 lb)

Launch history
- Status: Canceled
- Launch sites: El Hierro

First stage – Castor 4B
- Powered by: 1 Solid
- Maximum thrust: 429 kN (96,000 lb_{f})
- Burn time: 61 sec
- Propellant: AP / HTPB

Second stage – Deneb-F
- Powered by: 1 Solid
- Maximum thrust: 167.9 kN (37,700 lb_{f})
- Burn time: 35.6 sec
- Propellant: Solid

Third stage – Mizar-B
- Powered by: 1 Solid
- Maximum thrust: 50.29 kN (11,310 lb_{f})
- Burn time: 33.8 sec
- Propellant: Solid

Capricornio was a Spanish satellite launch vehicle developed by the Instituto Nacional de Técnica Aeroespacial (INTA) in the 1990s. It was intended to be Spain's first launcher.

Work on Capricornio started in 1990, INTA choosing to pursue a three-stage configuration. In concept, the launcher was to be a low-cost solution capable of placing up to 70 kg payloads, such as microsatellites, into 600 km polar orbits, or alternatively 60 to 140 kg payloads into low Earth orbit. In conjunction, INTA sought to establish the El Hierro Launch Centre from which it envisioned Capricornio being launched on a commercial basis.

There were allegations that aspects of Capricornio's design, such as its guidance system, had been derived from Condor missile developed by Argentina during the 1980s.

The Capricornio programme involved three phases, starting with the development of suitable rocket motors, progressing to the use of Capricornio's second and third stages together as the Argo sounding rocket, and finally the flight of the fully-assembled rocket itself. The first test launch of Capricornio, which was at one point scheduled to take place sometime in 1999, was never conducted as the programme was put on hold one year prior. The Capricornio program was formally cancelled during 2000 amid alleged foreign political pressure, competition from other launchers, and INTA's desire to focus on other endeavours.

== Development ==
Studies into what would later become Capricornio commenced at the Spanish aerospace firm Instituto Nacional de Técnica Aeroespacial (INTA) during 1990. The initiative built on ideas that the company had been considering as early as 1961. Multiple different configurations were examined prior to the selection of a three-stage launch vehicle. This vehicle, weighing 14,000 kg and standing at a height of 11 meters, was deemed sufficient for the launching of microsatellites weighing between 50 and 100 kg into low Earth orbit (LEO). Throughout the 1990s, INTA worked on the programme, which received the name Capricornio, intending for the launcher to be operated as a purely civilian initiative that would be operated on a commercial basis.

The programme was supported by several parallel endeavours by INTA. One such effort, for which INTA collaborated with both the INSA and the American aerospace firm Lockheed Martin, examined the prospective development of a suitable launch range for small satellite launchers in the Canary Islands, now known as the El Hierro Launch Centre. The Capricornio programme encountered some controversy over allegations that it could be adapted into a medium-range ballistic missile and used for military purposes; furthermore, that the rocket had incorporated elements of the Argentinian Condor missile. Spain was heavily involved in the destruction of these missiles, and it was speculated that this arrangement led to Spain obtaining their guidance apparatus; however, Argentinian officials disputed these claims, stating that the guidance systems had been removed prior to even arriving in Spain.

The first phase of activity on the Capricornio programme centred upon the development of solid motors, which included the use of both the INTA-100 and INTA-300 sounding rockets from the El Arenosillo test range in southern Spain. During June 1997, it was announced that the American manufacturer Thiokol was to supply the Castor 4B solid rocket motor that would power the first stage of Capricornio. For the second phase of the programme, it was intended to use both the second and third stages of Capricornio as the Argo sounding rocket; it was originally planned to fly sometime in late 1998 or early 1999.

The third phase of the Capricornio programme involved all the work necessary to achieve the first launch of the complete Capricornio rocket. At one point, it had been intended for this first flight to be conducted from El Hierro. Capricornio was reportedly scheduled to take flight sometime in late 1999 or 2000, and was to have carried a pair of small satellites: Nanosat 01 (developed by the Polytechnic University of Madrid) and Venus (Polytechnic University of Madrid and other universities in Mexico and Argentina).

However, Capricornio would never actually fly. Development of the launcher had been formally suspended during 1998, one year prior to the planned launch; one claimed reason for this outcome was that INTA had decided to redirect its resources into other endeavours. The development of Capricornio had been opposed by the United States, and thus it is suspected that the programme had been shelved for political reasons. The aerospace author Brian Harvey, speculated the competition from Arianespace's Vega launcher had made the role of Capricornio less clear.

== Configuration ==
Three-stage solid propellant launcher. Overall length of 18.25 m, body diameter of 1.0 m and weighs 15,035 kg at launch.

- Stage 1 contained a single Thiokol Castor 4B rocket motor with HTPB-based composite solid propellant.
- Stage 2 contained a single Deneb-F rocket motor.
- Stage 3 contained a single Mizar-B rocket motor.

== See also ==
- Miura 1 – Suborbital recoverable launch vehicle of the Spanish company PLD Space
- Miura 5 – European orbital recoverable rocket of the company PLD Space
- List of orbital launch systems – List of orbital rockets
