= INTA SIVA =

Spanish unmanned aerial vehicle

SIVA
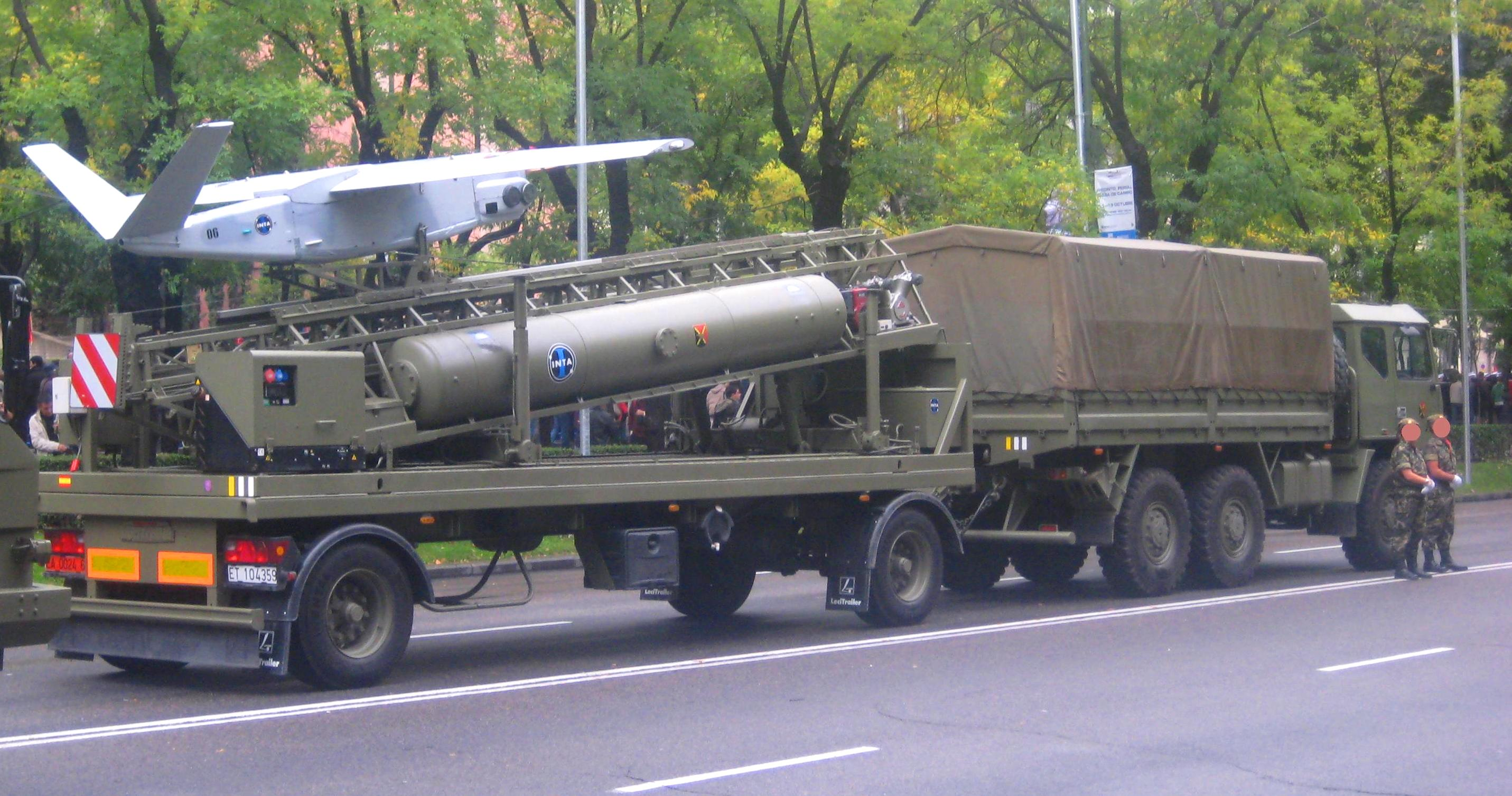

General information
- Type: UAV
- Role: Reconnaissance
- National origin: Spain
- Manufacturer: INTA
- Primary user: Spanish Army, Spanish Air Force
- Number built: 4

History
- Introduction date: 2006
- In service: 20th September 2006
- Developed into: INTA Milano

The INTA SIVA (Spanish: Sistema Integrado de Vigilancia Aérea, lit. 'Integrated System of Aerial Surveillance') is a unmanned aerial vehicle system developed by the National Institute for Aerospace Technology as part of the Spanish Unmanned Aerial Vehicles Program.

== Development ==
The program was launched in 1988, when the Spanish government began experimenting with national program to develop a tactical UAV surveillance system for its armed forces. The main objective of the program was to fully develop an unmanned air component for the army, specially in reconnaissance and observation roles. This would allow to free manned aerial assets to focus on more cost effective roles in addition to integrate aerial elements into ground units. Additionally, the project involved both public and private institutions in order to boost the Spanish industrial base and know-how. The program culminated in 2006 with four units being produced in addition to its ground control segment and a pneumatic launcher.

In 2013, SIVA was equipped with a fully automated take-off and landing system.This allowed the system to perform fully autonomous flights, freeing operators to focus on mission planning and decision making based on the information provided by the system.

== Characteristics ==
The UAV is made of high performance FAR 23 compliant carbon fiber. It can be launched conventionally, using a fixed tricycle landing gear and taking of by its own means from a flat surface, or with a pneumatic launcher. For its recovery, the system can land using the same landing gear or by means of a drogue parachute and several airbags.

Its ground segment can be contained in a NATO II shelter and has three differentiated posts each one in charge of planning, monitoring and controlling (both aircraft and sensors). It is also capable of sending the information gathered to a tactical center via satellite. The ground segment can also be employed as a training station for simulated flights and perform after action reports. The whole system can be transported in three cross country capable Iveco M-250 trucks.

== Operators ==
- Spanish Army: Regimiento de Artillería de Campaña nº 63 since 2006
- Spanish Air and Space Force: Unmanned Aerial Systems School since 2012

== Operational history ==
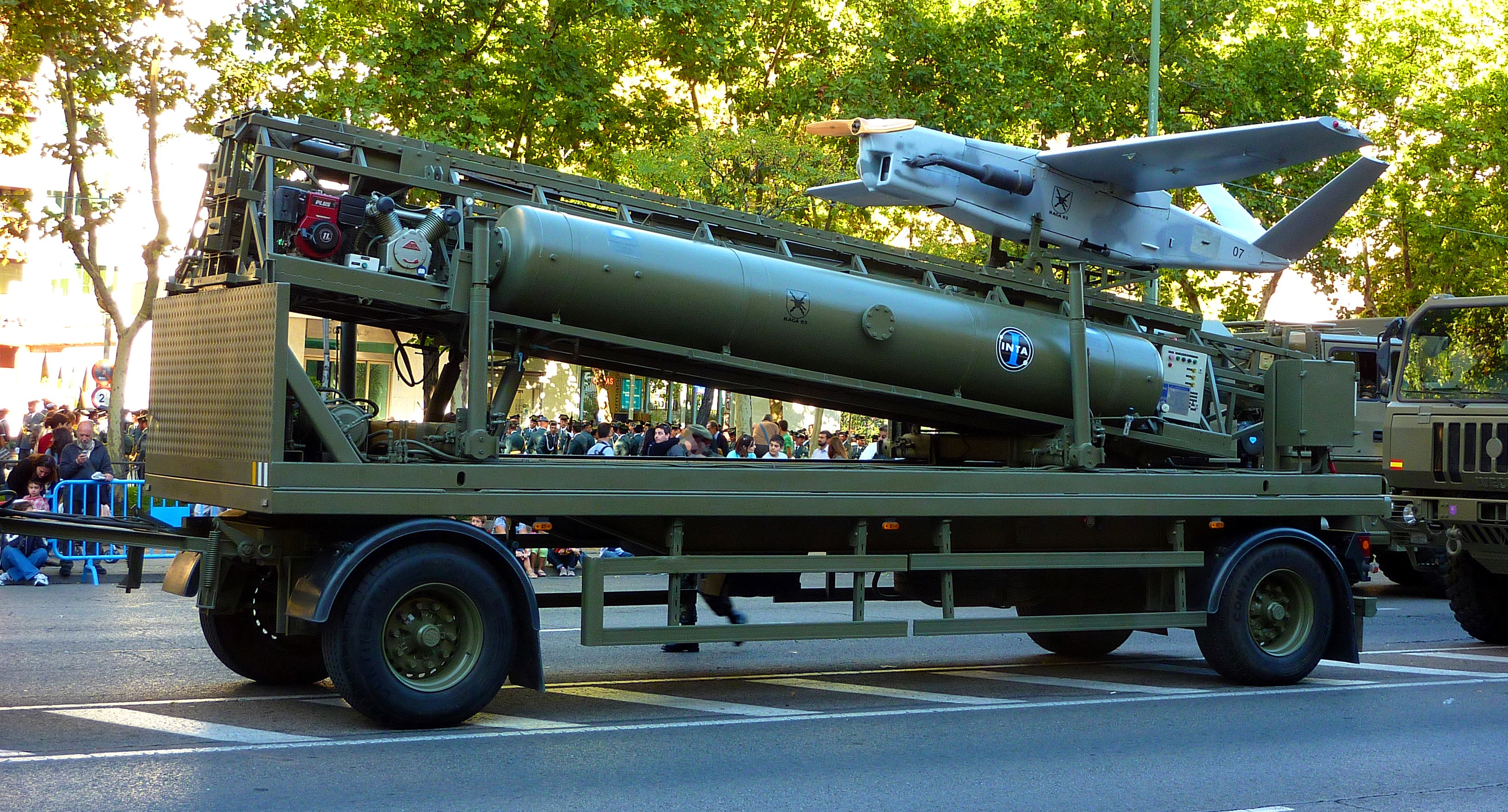
SIVA on launching tube.

The 20th of September 2006, the first units were formally received by the Spanish Army in a ceremony in Torrejón de Ardoz. Along with the UAVs, 26 officers and sub officers were awarded certifications to operate and maintain them, having completed a 11 moth course.

During February 2007, the planes began testing rounds in San Gregorio, Zaragoza. They were evaluated in roles of search and rescue, fire suppression and hostage situations. In addition, they were also tested in different environmental conditions such as nocturnal flight. The Army also expressed interest in collaborating with the Civil Guard and civilian organizations in order to use the UAV in border guarding roles.

The aircraft was officially presented to the public in the military parade of the National Day of Spain 2007.

The first units were integrated into the Grupo de Artillería de Información y Localización de Objetivos III (GAIL) belonging to the Regimiento de Artillería de Campaña nº 63 (63rd Field Artillery Regiment) to serve in a spotting and target correcting role. Later, in 2012, some units were transferred to the Air Force in a UAV training capacity.

Between the 22nd and 26 April 2013, the SIVA completed the first fully automated flight in an exercise in the base "Conde de Gazola" in San Andrés del Rabanedo. It was the first of its kind since the establishment of a legal framework for fully autonomous flights in Spain in 2012.

The 3rd of June 2016 a SIVA belonging to INTA and with base in Matacán suffered and accident that forced the deployment of its recovery parachute. It safely landed on Calvarrasa de Abajo suffering minimal damage. The aircraft was flown from the Escuela de Sistemas Aéreos no Tripulados belonging to the Spanish Air Force.

== Future ==
Since 2013, a team in INTA directed by Jaime Cabezas is working on a successor: the INTA Milano. It is projected to have an increased payload capacity of 200 kg and be able to carry a Synthetic Aperture Radar and weapons.

== Technical data ==
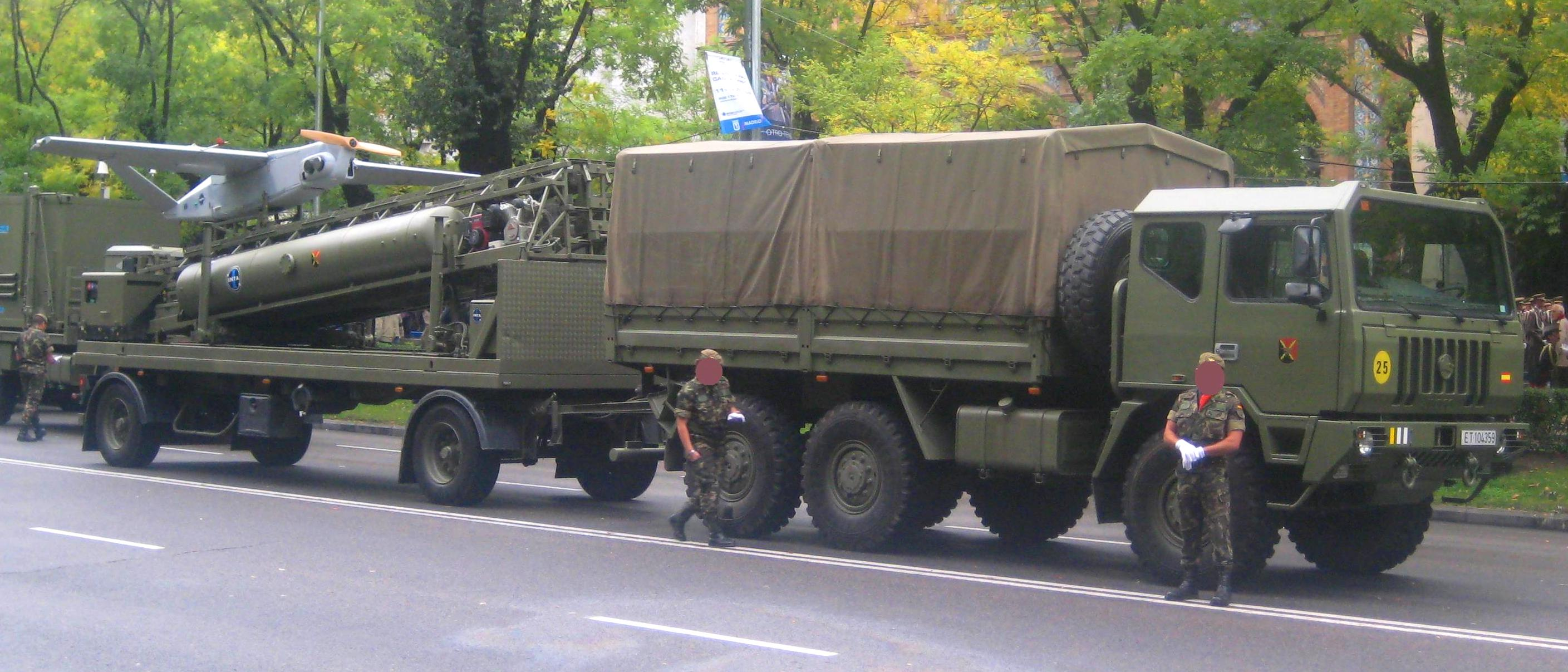
SIVA ground component.

INTA provides a list of their characteristics:

=== General characteristics ===
- Length: 4.02 m
- Wingspan: 5.81 m
- Height: 1.63 m (1.15 m without landing gear)
- Wing surface: 3 m^{2}
- Weight: 300 kg
- Fuel capacity: 60 kg
- Payload: 35 kg (or 80 liters with a maximum power requirement of 400 W).
- Powerplant: 1 × Rotax 503 2T/500 cm3 boxer engine of 49.6 kW (37 hp).
  - Propeller: two-blade, 1,35 m diameter

=== Performance ===
- Maximum speed: 190 km/h
- Cruise speed: 150 km/h
- Range: 150 km
- Autonomy: 7 h (fully loaded)
- Service ceiling: 4,000 m (13,100 ft)
- Take-off area: 650x18 m

=== Avionics ===
A selection between the following:

- GRIP Multi-frequency GNSS receiver, featuring Galileo's AltBOC signal reception
- VISIONA Camera- and LiDAR-based navigation system, and input provider for HDA tasks
- CAPTURA Miniaturized INS/GNSS acquisition system and time-reference server
- Fault-tolerant Processing Architecture LEON3-based processing architecture including INS/GNSS/image processing software
- Prosilica GC2450C Camera for online image processing tasks
- Hokuyo UTM- 30LX LiDAR for online digital elevation model generation
- Sony NEX-5N Camera for high-resolution observation
- EPSON M- G350-PD11 Low-cost miniaturized IMU
- Javad TR-G3T Geodetic-grade, multi-frequency GNSS receiver

== See also ==
- EMT Luna X-2000
- General Atomics MQ-1 Predator
- SAGEM Crecerelle
- Yakovlev Ptchela
