= El Arenosillo =

Rocket launch site in Spain

El Arenosillo Test Centre (CEDEA)
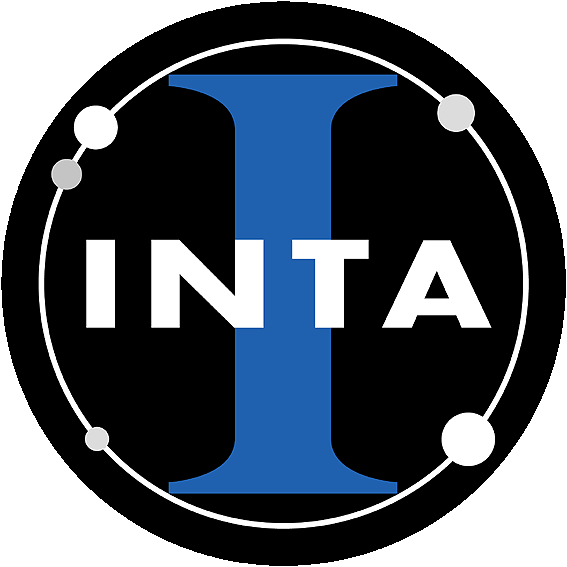

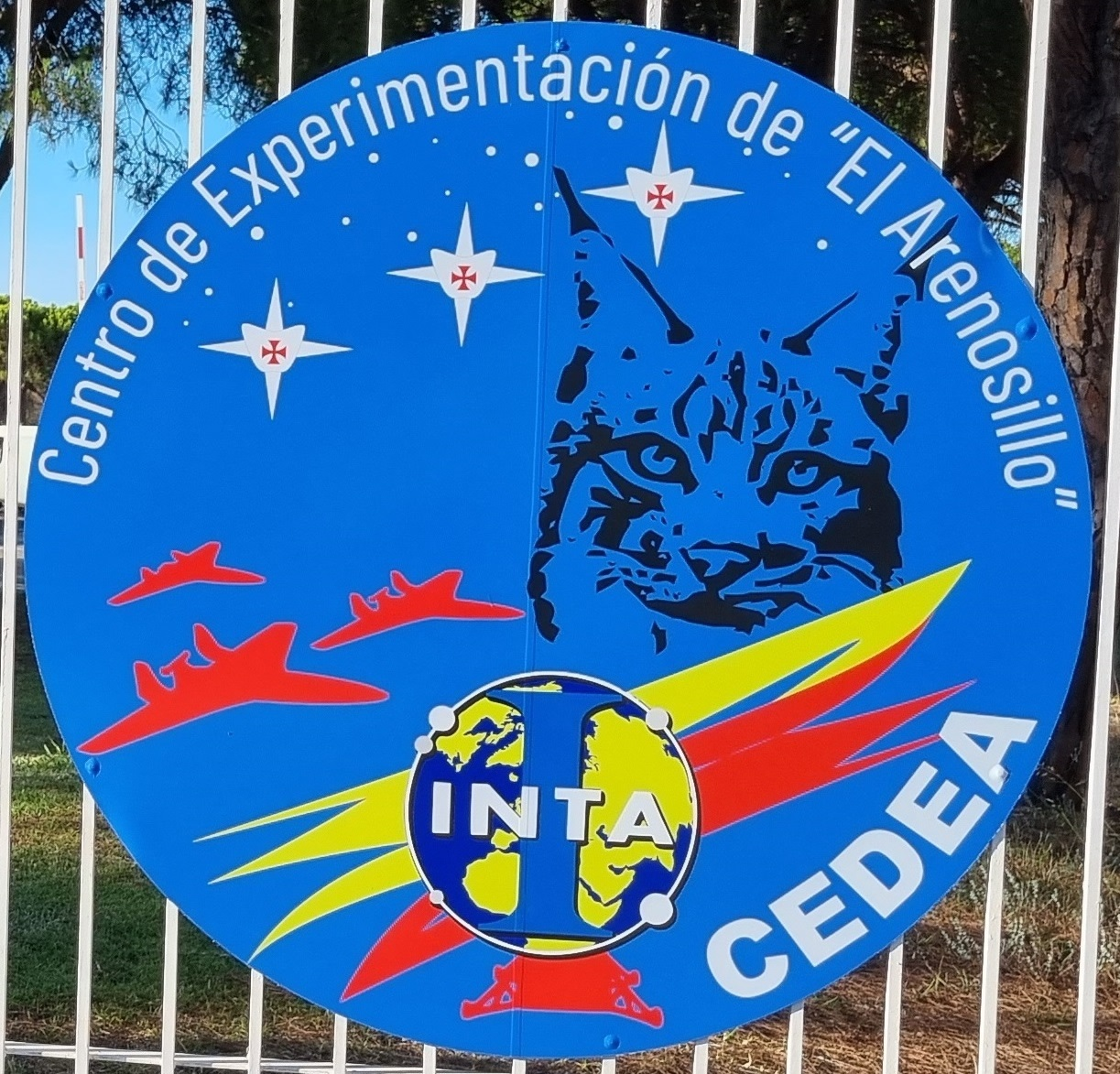

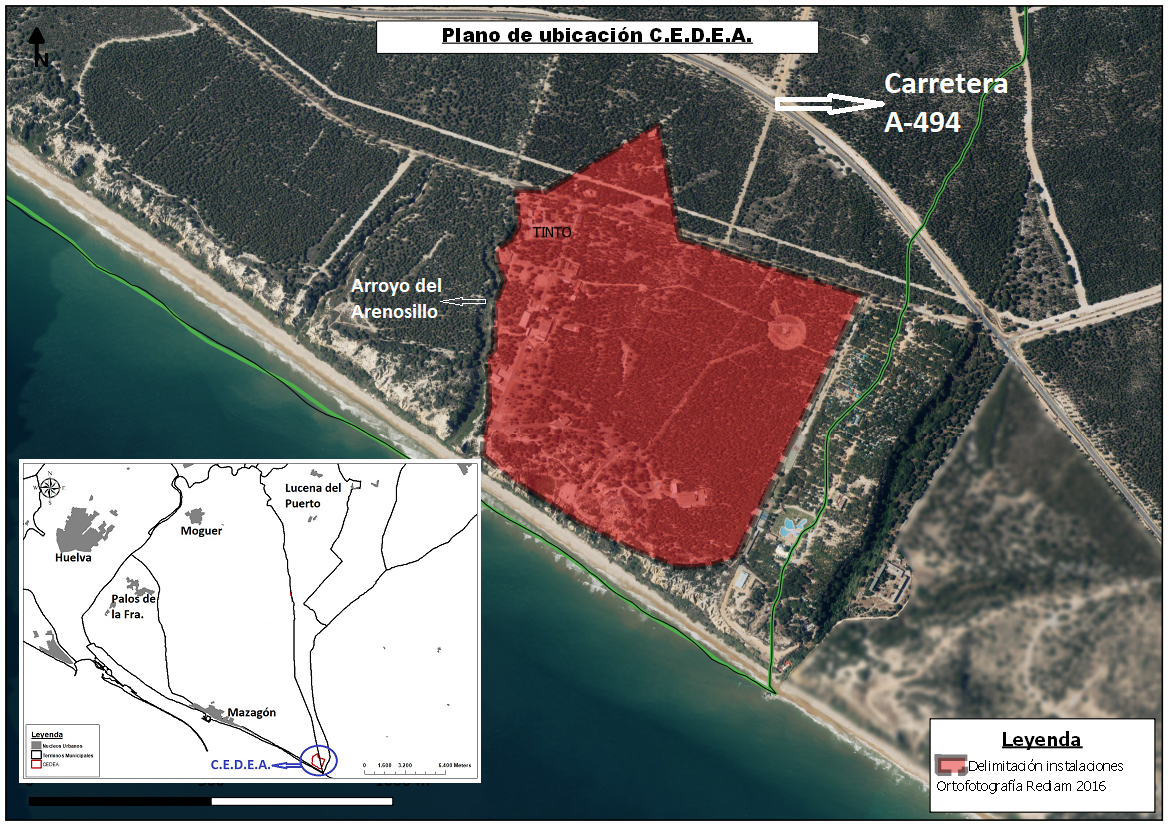
- C.E.D.E.A. installations in Moguer

- C.E.D.E.A. installations in Moguer
- Formation: 4 October 1966
- Type: rocket launch site
- Location: Moguer, Spain
- Coordinates: 37°05′49″N 6°44′19″W
- Owner: INTA (Spain)
- Director: Carlos Maestro Fernández

El Arenosillo Test Centre (CEDEA) is the name of a rocket launch site for suborbital rockets managed by INTA, located in Moguer (Spain). It is located in the province of Huelva, Andalucía, in the southwest coast of Spain (37.1° N, 6.7° W). CEDEA is adjacent to the Center of Excellence for Unmanned Systems (CEUS).

El Arenosillo is also the location of an autonomous astronomical observatory of the BOOTES network, with two domes and three telescopes.

== Equipment ==
Among the main facilities that INTA has at CEDEA are (updated 2009):

- Two automatic telemetry systems (fixed and mobile) in S and L bands
- HF, UHF and VHF communications systems
- Airborne and maritime surveillance radars, NORTHCONTROL
- Mobile path radar, VITRO RIR 778X, 250 Kw
- Radar path, TRACOR RIR 779C, 1 Mw
- 1Mw VITRO RIR 778C mobile path radar with destruction command
- Three autonomous mobile optronic stations, MSP 2000, equipped with IR, TV, cinema and radar sensors (3D, high precision and with telemetric capabilities)
- Weather center with real-time information, satellite data reception and complete radiosonde system
- Control center where all the information necessary for the supervision and monitoring of a launching operation (air traffic control, meteorology, cartography, sensor data integration, flight safety, etc.) is centralized.
- Evaluation center: preparation, analysis and evaluation of reports
- Two high speed cameras (10000 images/s)

Complementing the above, the Center also has:

- Meteorological laboratory and probe balloons
- Presentation and conference room
- Telemetry, radar and optronic workshops
- Mechanical workshop, electrical workshop, sanitary service and warehouses
- Accommodation service for operations
- Laboratory for photographic processing

In 2017 part of the equipment was damaged in a wildfire. In the years 2018 and 2019 INTA has dedicated part of its budget to replace damaged equipment.

== Pads ==
Incomplete list of launch pads:

- Nike – 37.0978°N 6.7372°W Operational. Based on a modified Nike Hercules system
- Sermiat – Unoperational. Used for Centaure rockets
- Médano del Loro – Operational. Is an adjacent launch site managed by Spanish Army

== Launch history ==
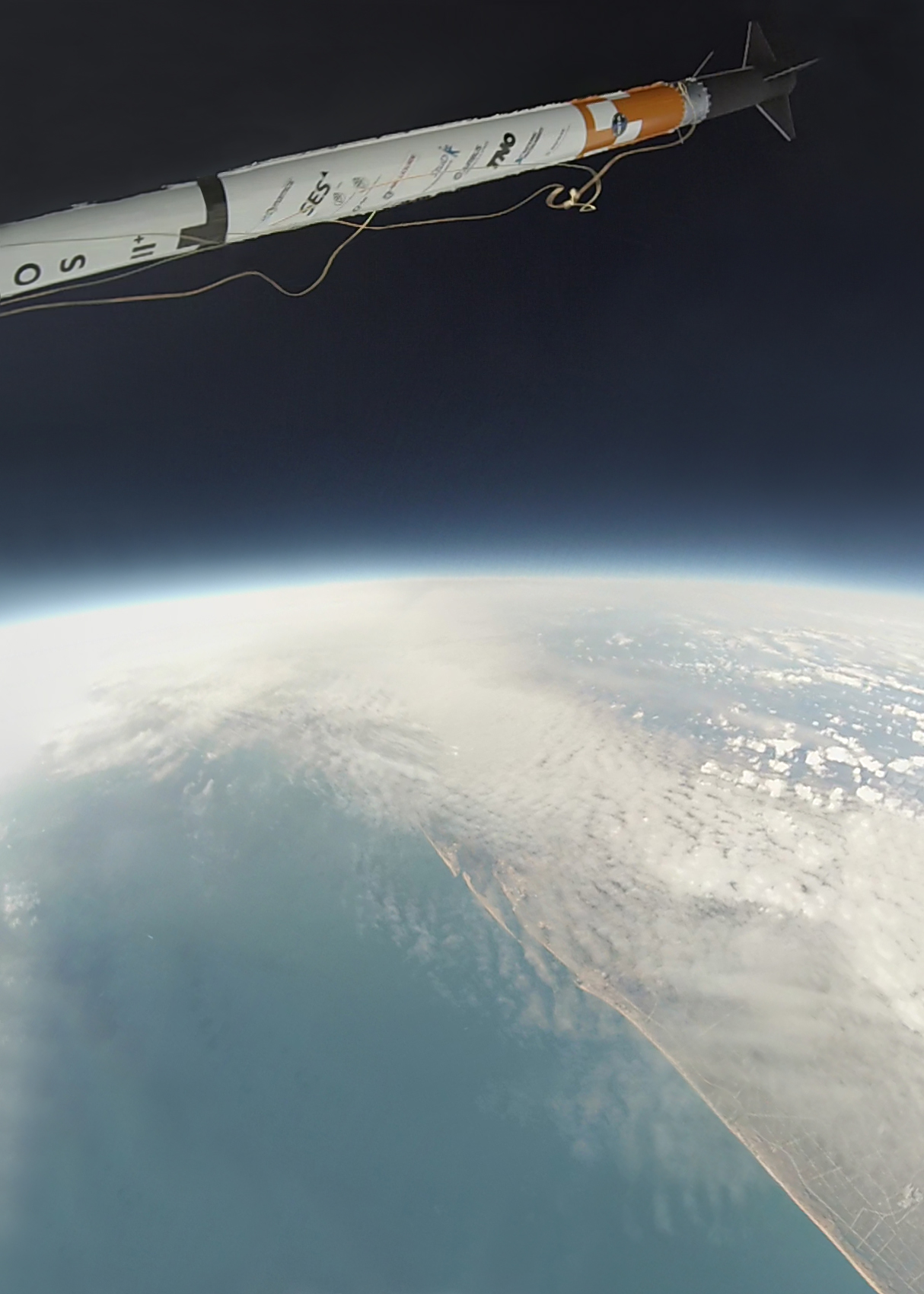
Stratos II+ sounding rocket launched from El Arenosillo.

The first launch of a rocket from El Arenosillo took place 15 October 1966. Up to 1994 a total of 557 rockets were launched from this base, mainly of the Skua type for atmospheric soundings and in collaboration with other countries. Other rockets launched included Nike Cajun, Nike Apache, Centaure, Black Brant, Skylark, Petrel, Super Loki, INTA-255, INTA-300 and INTA-300B.

All rockets for atmospheric soundings in Spain are launched from El Arenosillo.

In 2015 Delft Aerospace Rocket Engineering broke the European altitude record for amateur rocketry by launching the Stratos II+ rocket to 21.5 km altitude from El Arenosillo.

On 1 March 2017, Zero 2 Infinity tested its first rocket, a Bloostar prototype, in El Arenosillo. A balloon took Bloostar to 25 km. At 25 km the ignition of the rocket took place. The goals of the mission were: (i) validation of the telemetry systems in Space conditions, (ii) controlled ignition, (iii) stabilization of the rocket, (iv) monitoring of the launch sequence, (v) parachute deployment, and finally, (vi) sea recovery. All these goals were achieved in full.

In 2023 PLD Space launched its first rocket Miura 1 from El Arenosillo.

Date (UTC)	Vehicle	Payload	Launch pad	Result	Remarks
15 October 1966	Skua	INTA, Carabela 4 Aeronomy / test	?	Success	First launch, 81 km apogee
19 July 1969	INTA-255	?	?	Success	
20 December 1969	INTA-255	?	?	Success	
22 December 1970	INTA-255	?	?	Success	
12 January 1974, 19:12	Skylark	H-GR-58	?	Success	
27 June 1976	Black Brant IV	ASTRO-6, EUV radiation	?	Success	720 km apogee
18 February 1981	INTA-300	?	Nike	Success	
7 April 1992	INTA-100	?	?	Success	First launch of INTA-100. 120 km apogee
21 October 1993	INTA-300B	?	Nike	Success	
16 April 1994	INTA-300B	?	Nike	Success	
16 Oct 2015	Stratos II+	?	?	Success	21.457 km (new European amateur record)
1 March 2017	Bloostar	?	–	Success	Bloostar first test
26 July 2018	Stratos III	?	?	Failure	
11 April 2019	Miura 5	None	?	Success	Drop test 5 km
23 October 2021	Stratos IV	?	?	Failure (Aborted)	
20 November 2021	Bondar	?	?	Success	7.8 km apogee (Spanish amateur record)
7 October 2023	Miura 1	Payload from ZARM	Médano del Loro	Success	46 km apogee

Only some launches are listed here. For information on individual rockets, see the List of rockets launched from El Arenosillo.
