= Cosmic Research =

- Discipline: Space science
- Language: English
- Edited by: Anatoli A. Petrukovich

Publication details
- Former name(s): Artificial Earth Satellites
- History: 1963-present
- Publisher: MAIK Nauka/Interperiodica (Russia)
- Frequency: Bimonthly
- Open access: Hybrid
- Impact factor: 0.419 (2020)

Standard abbreviations
- ISO 4: Cosm. Res.

Indexing
- CODEN: CSCRA7
- ISSN: 0010-9525 (print); 1608-3075 (web)
- LCCN: 67005998
- OCLC no.: 48412178
- Artificial Earth Satellites
- ISSN: 0571-2041

Links
- Journal homepage

Cosmic Research (Russian: Kosmicheskie Issledovaniya) is a bimonthly peer-reviewed scientific journal that was established in 1963. It is published by MAIK Nauka/Interperiodica and published online by Springer Science+Business Media. The editor-in-chief is Anatoli A. Petrukovich (Space Research Institute, Russian Academy of Sciences, Moscow, Russia). The journal is a continuation of the Soviet-Russian publication Artificial Earth Satellites (ISSN 0571-2041), in existence between 1960 and 1964.

== Scope ==
The journal covers research in space science and related space technologies. Subject coverage includes cosmic physics, astronautics in geophysics, and astronautics in general.

== Abstracting and indexing ==
This journal is abstracted and indexed in Science Citation Index Expanded, Current Contents/Physical, Chemical & Earth Sciences, Academic OneFile, Academic Search, Astrophysics Data System, Chemical Abstracts Service, INIS Atomindex, Inspec, and Scopus. According to the Journal Citation Reports, the journal has a 2020 impact factor of 0.419.
