= INTA-300 =

Suborbital two-stage launch vehicle of the Spanish INTA

- INTA-300 diagram
- Country of origin: Spain

Size
- Height: 7.27 m (23.9 ft)
- Diameter: 0.26 m (0.85 ft)
- Stages: 2

Capacity

Payload to Suborbital
- Altitude: 50 km (31 mi)
- Mass: 50 kg (110 lb)

Launch history
- Status: Retired
- Launch sites: El Arenosillo
- Total launches: 6
- First flight: October 9th, 1974
- Last flight: February 18th, 1981

First stage – Aneto
- Gross mass: 503 kilograms (1,109 lb)
- Burn time: 3 s

Second stage – Teide
- Maximum thrust: 16.3 kN (3,700 lbf)
- Burn time: 16 s

The INTA-300, also known as the "Flamenco", was a two-stage Spanish sounding rocket. It consisted of a launch stage from the type Heron and an upper stage of the type Snipe.

== History ==
Based on a Bristol Aerojet's INTA-255 rocket, the INTA-300 is capable of reaching altitudes of 300 km (186 mi) alone and to 50 km (31 mi) with its maximum payload weight, having a thrust of 138.00 kN.

The intent of the INTA-300 was to be able to lift a payload of 50 kg to 300 km. With the help of the Bristol Aerojet, the Instituto Nacional de Técnica Aeroespacial was able to make a powerful enough prototype in 1981, after three unsuccessful launches. By the time of the fourth model's construction, funding had been cut.

When funds became available again in the 1990s, the fourth model of the INTA-300 was modified into a more efficient model dubbed the INTA-300B, capable of carrying heavier payloads and reaching higher altitude.

== Launches ==
The INTA-300 was launched by INTA six times between 1974 and 1994 from El Arenosillo.

Date	Launch Vehicle	Mission Type	Nation	Apogee	Notes
October 9, 1974	INTA-300	Test mission	Germany	254 km	Failed to reach expected altitude
October 21, 1975	INTA-300	Aeronomy / test	Germany	240 km	Failed to reach expected altitude
June 28, 1978	INTA-300	FAILURE	Spain	0 km	Failure
February 18, 1981	INTA-300	Aeronomy mission	Spain	285 km	First completely successful launch
October 21, 1993	INTA-300B	FEIROX / FEIROH Aeronomy	Spain	154 km	
April 16, 1994	INTA-300B	O2-INTA300 Aeronomy	Spain	156 km	

== See also ==
- Fulmar
- INTA-255
- Capricornio (rocket)
- Miura 1
