= Minisat 01 =

Spanish satellite

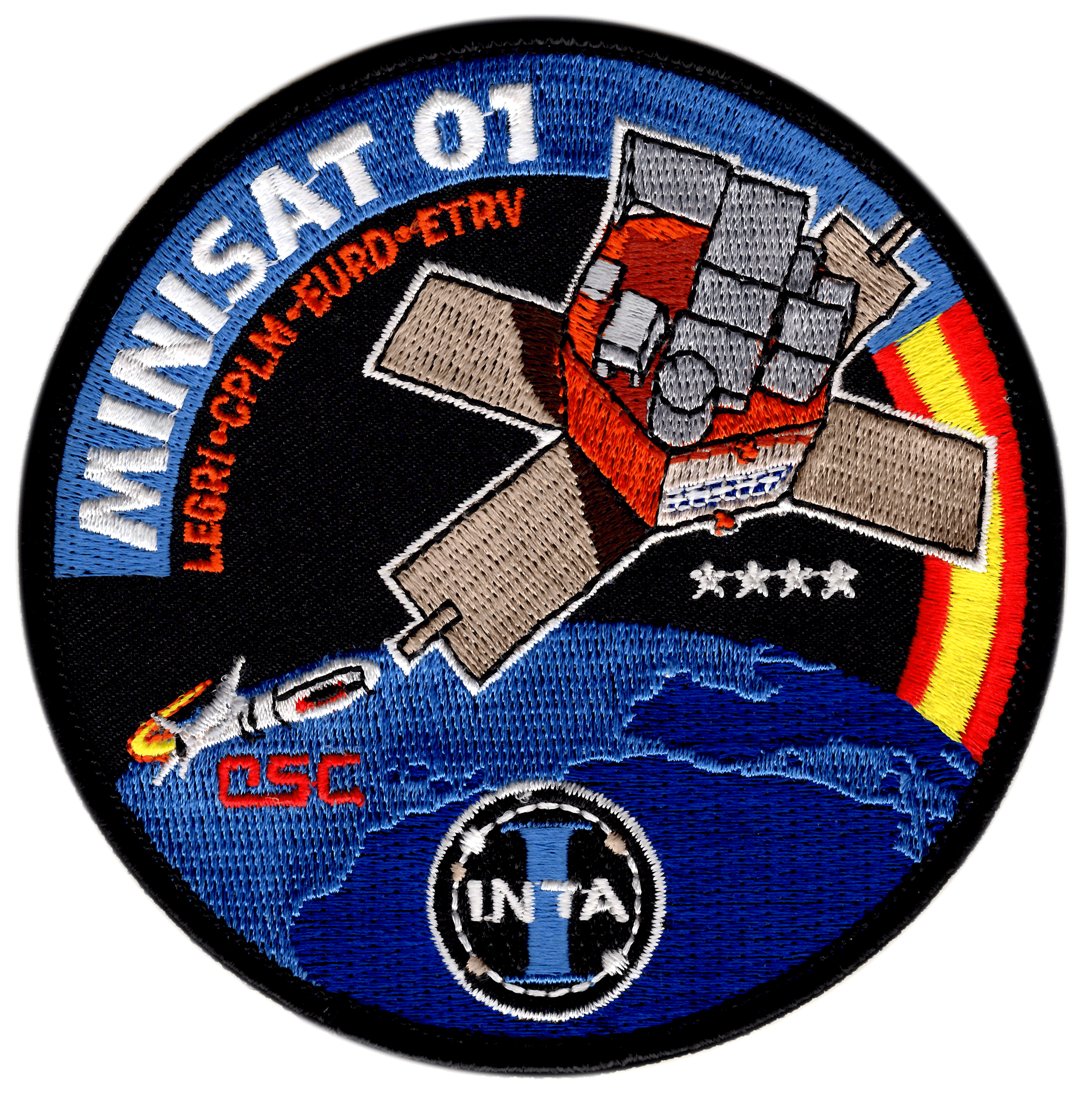
- Minisat 01 mission patch
- Operator: INTA
- COSPAR ID: 1997-018A
- SATCAT no.: 24779
- Mission duration: 5 years

Spacecraft properties
- Launch mass: 195 kg

Start of mission
- Rocket: Pegasus-XL

Payload
- EURD, CPLM, LEGRI, ETRV

The Minisat 01 was a satellite developed in Spain as a means to kickstart its space program. The project started in 1990 and was funded by both the Inter-Ministerial Committee of Space Science and Technology (CICYT) and the Instituto Nacional de Técnica Aeroespacial (INTA) who was also responsible for the project's management. After some feasibility studies, the satellite entered the design phase in 1993. The main objectives of the program were to develop a technology demonstrator to test and develop the nation's capabilities to produce and manage spacecraft. To this end, INTA teamed up with private enterprises and universities to acquire funds and resources. Nonetheless, emphasis was also put on keeping the costs to a minimum and to ensure affordability.

The initial program was supposed to involve at least four minisatellites (Minisat 1 to 4) but only Minisat 01 was put into orbit. A second design, the Minisat 02, was developed and tested in 2001 but the mission was canceled and the satellite was scrapped by 2002.

== Mission ==
The Minisat 01 was conceived to perform Earth observation on a low orbit in addition to four different scientific experiments:

- EURD (Espectrógrafo Ultravioleta extremo para la observación de la Radiación Difusa – Extreme UV Spectrograph for the Study of Diffuse Radiation).
- CPLM (Column of Liquid Bridge in Microgravity).
- LEGRI (Low Energy Gamma Ray Imager).
- ETRV (Experiencia Tecnológica de un Regulador de Velocidad – Speed Regulator Technology Demonstrator).

An alternative payload was devised but not implemented consisting on four additional experiments: GOYA (Gamma-ray burst Observer Yearned-Always), SIXE (Spanish Italian X-ray Experiment), DOPA, XRASE. These experiments would be later projected for the Minisat 02 before the whole project was scrapped.

== Body ==
The satellite was built between CASA, who was in charge of developing the platform, and INTA, who mainly devised the different payload and experiment implementation. A great degree of emphasis was put on keeping cost down so the construction was modular (able to allocate up to 300 kg of payload), small (about 1145 mm x 1005 mm x 1170 mm) and projected to have a service life of 4 to 5 years. The body ended up weighing 195 kg (100 kg structure and 95 kg of payload) and was shaped like a hexagonal prism with the experiments attacked to the top and bottom faces while the sides mounted 4 deployable AsGa solar panels (550 mm x 800 mm in size) capable each to fully provide the power needed to run the satellite (about 50 W).

The core contained a NiCd battery and the onboard central computing and processing unit (a modified Intel 80386 microprocessor) with 32 Mb of RAM, 512 kb of EEPROM, 2.4 MIPS of throughput, 32 MB of data storage and multiple redundant cores. A bus connection links the microprocessor to the experiments capable of providing point-to-point interfaces while managing the control subsystem. This was divided in two basic units: the thermal and the kinetic units. The first consisted of insulator coating around the body with both, internal and external, thermistors to measure temperature and active internal heaters around experiments and battery to keep the temperature within operational ranges. The kinetic unit ensured the Minisat 01 maintained a favorable position to maximize sunlight incidence on the solar panels in addition to stabilize the spacecraft on its 3 axis. This unit consisted on a combination of 3 torque rods placed orthogonally to each other and a reaction wheel in the spin plane. Data of the current position of the body was provided by two perpendicularly put Sun sensors and two biaxial magnetometers which, working in cooperation, could provide accurate information on the satellite's position up to ±3º of error.

Communication with Earth was maintained using bidirectional RF transmitters operating on the S-band with a downlink speed of 1 Mbit/s and an uplink speed of 2 kbit/s.

== Launch ==
The S/C was launched from an American Lockheed L-1011-385-1-15 TriStar registered N140SC with a Pegasus-XL rocket from Gando Air Base in the Canary Islands 21 April 1997. It was successfully put on a near-circular close orbit of 585 km of apoapsis and 566 km of periapsis with and inclination of 151º (29º retrograde) and an orbital period of 96 minutes.

The mission included the launch of the cremated remains of Gene Roddenberry, Timothy Leary, Gerard K. O'Neill along with those of 21 other people.

After 5 years of successful operation, the satellite reentered the atmosphere on 14 February 2002.

During its whole service life it was operated by INTA, who monitored the satellite from the Maspalomas Station (15º 37' 45" W, 27º 45' 49" N).

== Experiments ==
=== EURD ===
Spectral lines of Hydrogen were Lyman-alpha series is observable to the left.

Being the result of the joint efforts of INTA and the University of California, Berkeley, this device was to conduct spectrographic observations of diffuse EUV radiation in the interstellar medium to examine the Mesosphere's composition. The focus of these observations were oxygen lines and high energy (above 10 eV), high mean life (above 1024 s) neutrinos whose presence may be indicative of dark matter.

To achieve that, the device employed two independent spectrometers equipped with modulable spectral band (between 350 and 1100 Å). This allowed to compare and filter the readings obtained to minimize systematic errors caused by the ionizing nature of EUV, thus, ensuring a higher degree of precision. Each spectrometer was about 40x40x13 cm in size and 11 kg in weight with acute grating (8 cm of diameter, 18 cm of focal length with holographically ruled 2460 lines/mm and made of silicon/boron carbide) to protect the measuring instruments. Under the grating, the Multi-Channel Plate (MCP) detectors with wedge and strip encoding are allocated, facing the exterior through a lens which provides them with 26º x 8º FOV and four possible positions. These were: open (transmitting all wavelength), shielded (blocks all emission and allows for internal radiation readings), magnesium fluoride filter (which allows to measure Lyman-alpha spectral series), and aluminum filter (which blocks most of the Lyman radiation while letting EUV through).

The device was placed at one end of the satellite, facing an anti-sun direction and it was operated continuously during the satellite's life.

=== CPLM ===
Developed by the Technical University of Madrid the CPLM was experimentation module created to study the behavior of fluids when allocated inside axis-symmetric bridges under conditions of microgravity. It consisted of a test cell containing the fluid bridges embedded between several optical detectors, which were capable of measuring changes in position and shape of the fluid, and a command unit. This unit was itself built with a motor, able to change the direction of the bridges and to reset the experiment, and an accelerometer which measured the forces acting on the test fluid. The module was allocated inside a cylindrical container which also held the power supply, several temperature and pressure sensors, and a back-up memory card.

During its operational run, the liquid bridge would be oriented perpendicular to the z-axis (Sun-to-satellite direction) and activated for 5 minutes once a week. As a result, the satellite would spin ±0.375 rpm longitudinally as a direct consequence from the accelerations applied at the CPLM.

=== LEGRI ===
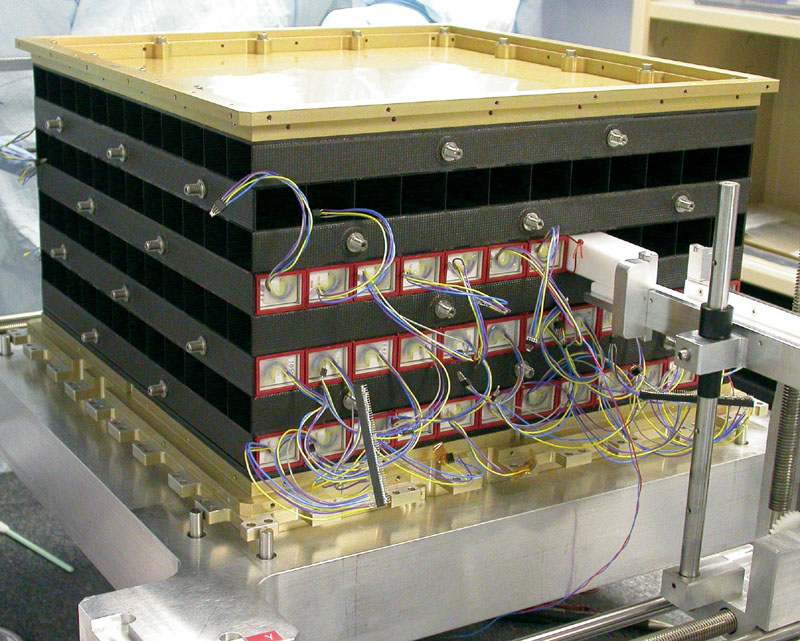
Fermi gamma telescope which is similar to the LEGRI.

The LEGRI was developed by an international composed by INTA, the Rutherford Appleton Laboratory (RAL), the University of Valencia, and the University of Birmingham. The main objective was to build a prototype gamma-ray telescope capable of detecting low energy radiation (between 10 and 200 keV) produced by the dispersion of gamma radiation emitted by celestial bodies such as black holes, binary stars or neutron stars.

The device was to incorporate some cutting-edge technology for its time, such as HgI_{2} emerging detectors developed by the Centro de Investigaciones Energéticas y Medioambientales (CIEMAT) capable of providing accurate readings on the operating energy range and a high degree of thermal resistance and a very good efficiency-weight ratio. Originally, 100 such detectors were to form the LEGRI sensing sub-unit but the experimental nature of this technology made INTA choose to mix an array of 80 HgI_{2} 20, more conventional and reliable CdZnTe detectors. This decision also allowed them to directly compare their performance when working on a 0 g environment and sharing FEE and background noise fluxes. Besides the sensing sub-unit, LEGRI incorporated a filtering unit made of a mechanical collimator supported on a honeycomb tungsten plate which is allocated in front of the detectors, a high voltage power supply needed to feed the device, and a processing unit which manages data and provides continuous attitude readings on the satellite to ease image reconstruction while avoiding signal noise.

=== ETRV ===
Developed by CASA, the ETRV was a speed regulation mechanism capable of deploying various devices such as solar panels, antennas, and proves. It consisted of an electrical motor connected a torsion spring mounted over a gearbox capable of regulating motion and providing a certain degree of stability. To simulate payloads, a small flywheel was added to the end of a deploying arm directly connected to the gearbox. To ensure the correct positioning of the movable arm an electromagnetic Reed switch would measure momentum, gyro angle, and rate of the arm providing real-time corrections for the system and allowing a maximum deployment speed of 180º in about 3 minutes.

The time control during the different phases of deployment was ensured by a pyrotechnic nut, responsible for maintaining the system's integrity until the firing of a pyro-kintetic charge which would signal the conditions were met to begin the whole placement process.
