= National Institute for Aerospace Technology =

Research agency in of Spain

- Instituto Nacional de Técnica Aeroespacial
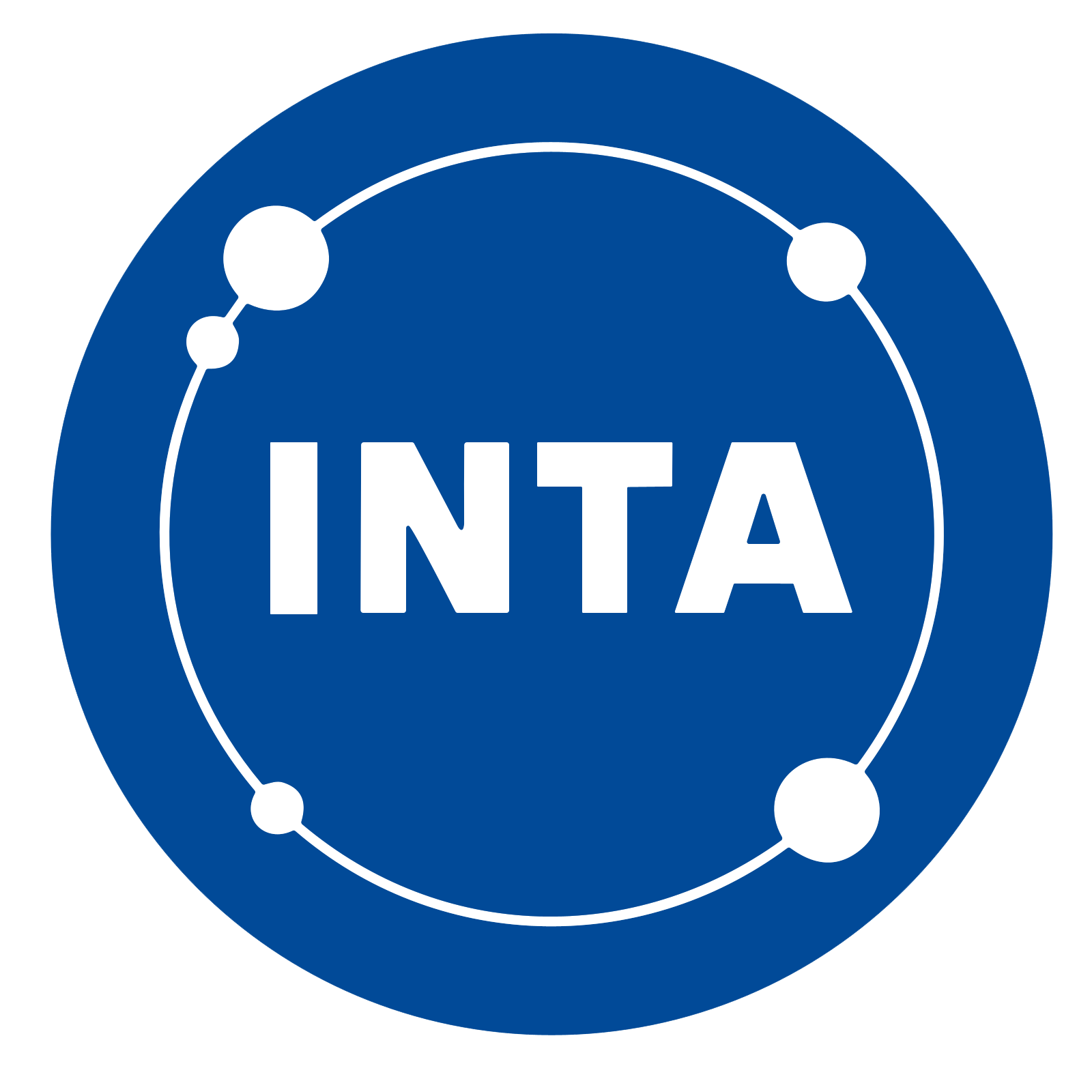

Agency overview
- Formed: 7 May 1942; 84 years ago
- Headquarters: Torrejón de Ardoz, Spain
- Employees: 1,527 (2025)
- Annual budget: ▲€196 million (2023)
- Agency executives: José María Salom Piqueres, Director-General; Luis Antonio Boixareu Torres, Secretary-General
- Parent department: Secretariat of State for Defence
- Website: www.inta.es

The National Institute for Aerospace Technology "Esteban Terradas" (Spanish: Instituto Nacional de Técnica Aeroespacial «Esteban Terradas» or INTA) is an autonomous agency of the Spanish public administration dependent on the Secretariat of State for Defence (SEDEF). It is responsible for the aerospace, aeronautics, hydrodynamics, and defense and security technologies research.

The INTA was established in 1942, as the National Institute of Aeronautical Technology (Instituto Nacional de Técnica Aeronáutica), and it was integrated in the Ministry of the Air. It has its headquarters in Torrejón de Ardoz, near Madrid.

== Organization ==
Its budget, €190 million in 2019, comes from the Spanish Ministry of Defence and from its own projects with the industry. In 2001, it had 1153 R&D staff with 325 full-time equivalent researchers. As of 2017, INTA had a total of 1500 employees, 80% of them are dedicated to R&D activities.

Its two main areas of activity are research and development (for example, in propulsion, materials, remote sensing) and certification and testing (for example, in aircraft, software, metrology).

== Programs and missions ==
=== Satellites ===
Main objectives of the Nano-satellites and Mini-satellites programmes;

- R&D programmes in the field of small satellites from 20 kg to 150 kg started in 1997 after MiniSat-1 launch, to keep running internat space activities at INTA.
- The systems and subsystems are mainly developed at INTA with collaborations in the R&D work with several universities and other institutions in Spain
- Development of multimission Service Modules compatible with available launchers: up to 150 kg and 60x60x80cm.
- Other specific tasks or satellite units to the small business Spanish industries, to encourage their participation in space technology.
- Give flight opportunities to the Spanish research community at an affordable budget target each 3–4 years, for new experiments and instruments, in orbit demonstration technologies, earth observation and space exploration from Low Earth orbit.

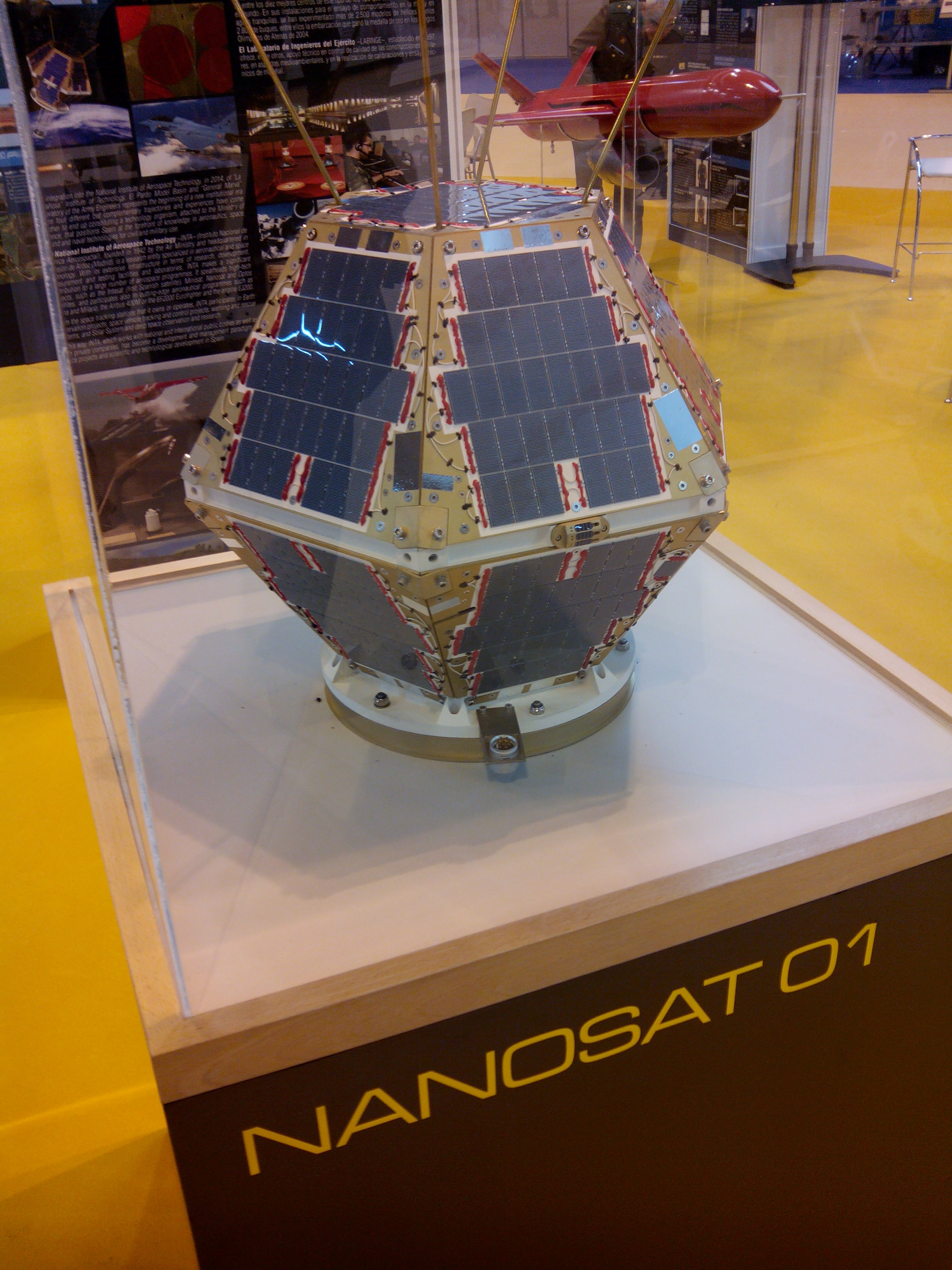
A Nanosat 01's duplicate

Satellite programmes:

- Intasat-1 was the first INTA satellite, launched on 15 November 1974 by a NASA Delta rocket.
- LBSAT/UPM-Sat 1 was launched on Ariane 4 on 7 July 1995.
- Minisat 01 weighted 190 kg and was launched on board of a Pegasus rocket over the Canary Islands in April 1997.
- Nanosat 01 project was created to continue with the Spanish space program of low cost satellites. It was finally put into orbit by the Ariane 5 launch vehicle in December 2004.
- Nanosat 1B was launched 5 years later on board of a Dnepr. Parallel to this research activity, a new research line was opened with MicroSat-1, which is a bit heavier at just above 100 kg and was scheduled to be launched in early 2012. NanoSat-2 SeoSat (Spanish Earth Observation Satellite) are also part of the INTA R&D projects.
- Xatcobeo was launched in 2012. Developed in collaboration with Agrupación Estratéxica Aeroespacial (currently Alén Space).
- OPTOS is the most recent addition to INTA's small satellites line. OPTOS is based on the CubeSat standard (a 3U platform) but goes far beyond the usual approach for this kind of satellites. It was designed, developed and tested with a completely professional methodology as it is conceived as a technology demonstrator with the target of proving that a satellite of that size can carry out dedicated missions as bigger satellites. It was launched in November 2013 by means of a Dnepr rocket and had a service life of 3 years.
- Paz is an observation and reconnaissance satellite launched on 22 February 2018 operated jointly with Hisdesat
- Ingenio was an optical imaging satellite destroyed during its launch in November 2020.
- Anser

All these satellites are totally Spanish in manufacture and design, comprising a low-cost multiuse platform, with modular design subsystems and standard interfaces with the payload module.

=== Launchers ===
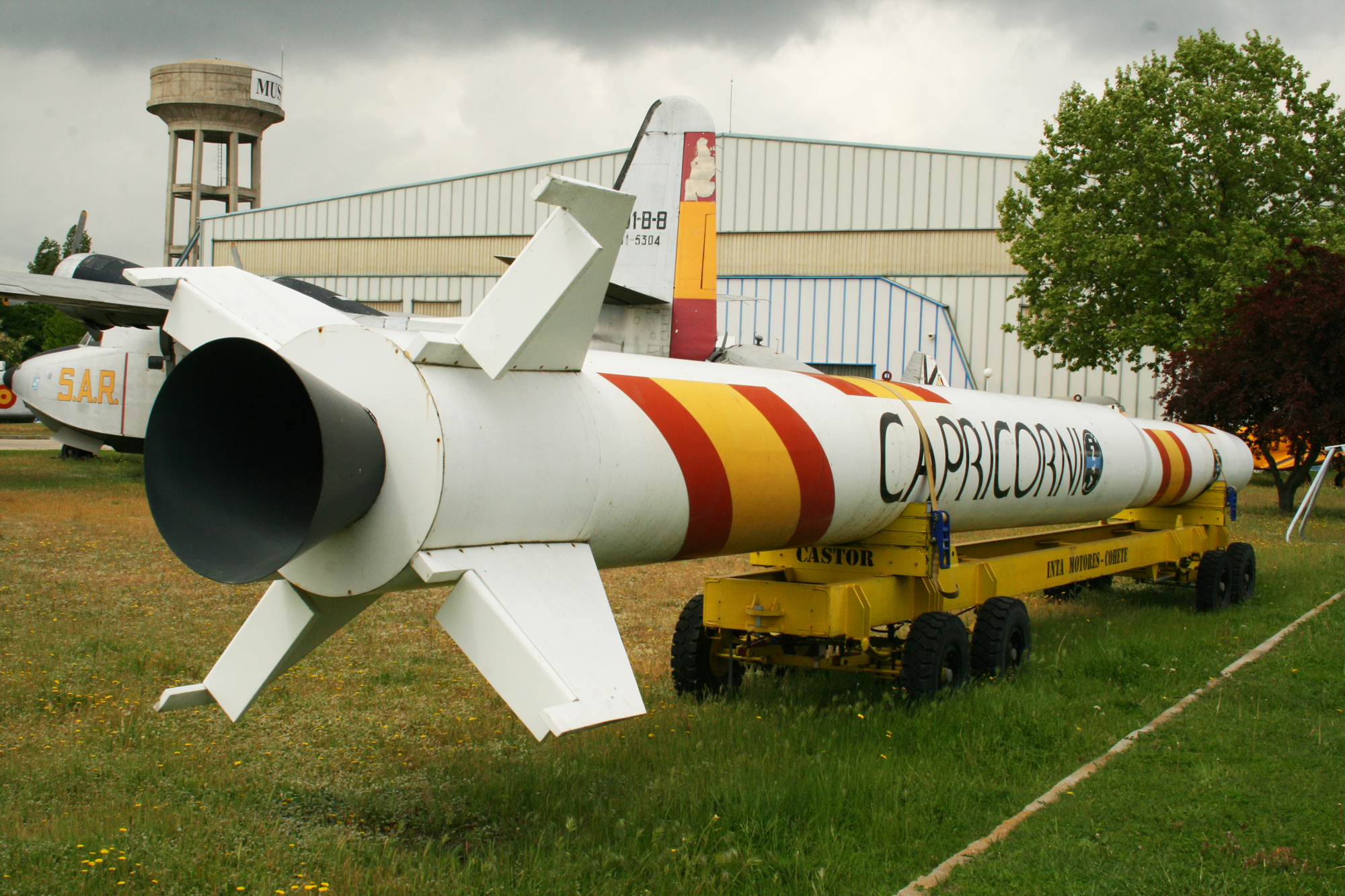
A Capricornio's duplicate.

INTA designed sounding and orbital rockets such as:

- INTA-100 (suborbital)
- INTA-255 (suborbital)
- INTA-300 (suborbital)
- Capricornio (orbital; never flown)
- Pilum (orbital; under development)

These operated from the El Arenosillo rocket launch site.

=== Aircraft ===
- SIVA UAV in service since 2006
- Diana is a high speed UAV-aerial target in service
- HADA suspenden UAV project
- ALO UAV in service pending commercialization
- Milano, MALE UAV

=== Instruments ===
- Raman Laser Spectrometer (RLS) for detecting minerals and potential biological pigments for the ESA's Rosalind Franklin rover
- Mars Environmental Dynamics Analyzer (MEDA) for NASA's Perseverance rover
- Rover Environmental Monitoring Station (REMS) for the Curiosity rover
- Temperature and Winds for InSight (TWINS) for the InSight mission
- Signs Of LIfe Detector (SOLID) to be flown in a future mission (current proposal is Icebreaker Life mission)

=== Other projects ===
- Artemisa

== Facilities ==
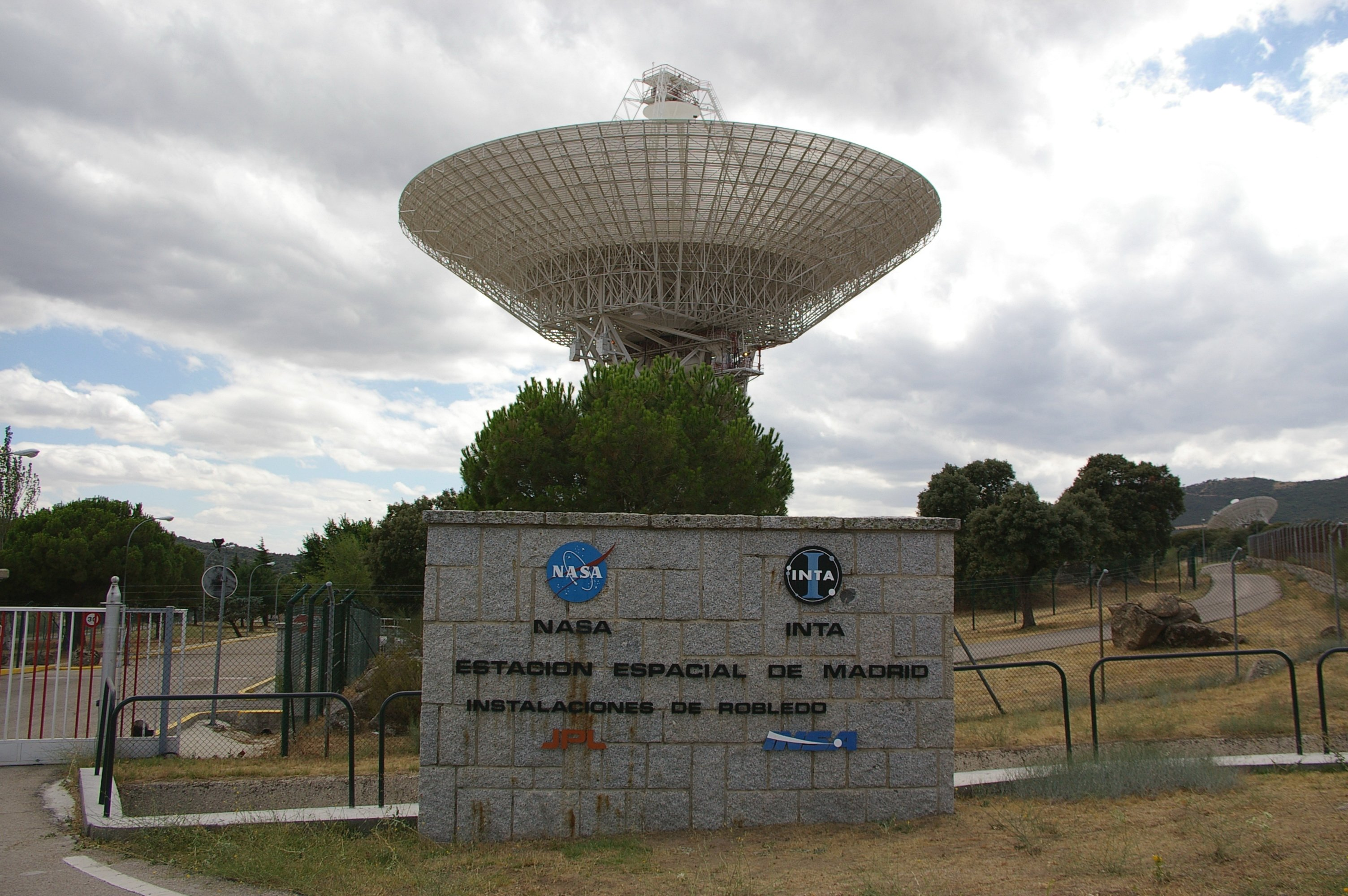
Madrid Deep Space Communication Complex, operated by INTA

This is an incomplete list of facilities:

=== Technological campuses ===
- INTA's headquarters in Torrejón de Ardoz, where the General Sub-directorates of Aeronautical Systems are located
- Campus of La Marañosa, in San Martín de la Vega, base for the General Sub-directorate of Naval Systems
- Campus of El Pardo, in El Pardo, base for the General Sub-directorate of Terrestrial Systems

=== Testing facilities ===
- Rozas Airborne Research Center (CIAR) in Castro de Rei, Galicia
- Cuadros Testing Laboratory in Cuadros, León
- General Marva Laboratory of Army Corps of Engineers (LABINGE) in Madrid
- Flight Experimentation Tests for Aircraft Certification in Chauchina, Granada
- Torregorda Testing Centre (CET) in Cádiz
- Airbus A400M Development Efforts in Seville
- INTA Turbojet Engine Test Centre (TETC INTA)

=== Tracking and launch sites ===
- El Arenosillo Test Centre is a rocket launch site in southern Spain
- El Hierro Launch Centre project for a spaceport in El Hierro
- Madrid Deep Space Communications Complex shared with NASA in Madrid
- Maspalomas Station
- Cebreros Station
- Villafranca Station
- GNSS Service Centre in Madrid

=== Other facilities ===
- Spanish Astrobiology Center shared with CSIC

== See also ==
- List of government space agencies
- Spanish Space Agency
