= Mur =

Mur may refer to:

== Places ==
- Mur (river) (or Mura), a river in central Europe
  - Mur Island, an artificial floating "island" in Graz, Austria
  - Mur Region, a geographically, linguistically, culturally, and ethnically defined region of Slovenia near the Mur River
- Mur, Switzerland, a commune in Vaud and Avenches
- Mur (Novi Pazar), a large village in Serbia
- Mur, part of the village of Murzasichle, Poland
- Mur, Iran (disambiguation)
- Mur de Huy, a 128 metres (420 ft) high hill located in Huy, Wallonia, Belgium
- Mur Sorkh, a village in Chahar Gonbad Rural District
- Tomen y Mur, a First Century AD Roman fort in Snowdonia, Gwynedd, Wales

== People ==
- Mur (surname)

== Arts and entertainment ==
- Múr, Icelandic metal band
- Mur Murs, a 1981 documentary film directed by Agnès Varda
- Art Mûr, a private contemporary art gallery in Montreal, Quebec, Canada

== Other uses ==
- Mur (cuneiform), a cuneiform sign
- An abbreviation for muramic acid
- mur, ISO 639-3 code for the Murle language, spoken in South Sudan
- Mur ligase, the bacterial cell wall

== MUR ==
- Mauritian rupee, by ISO 4217 currency code
- Medicine use review, UK service
- Melbourne University Regiment of the Australian Army Reserve
- Michigan United Railways, US, 1906-1924
- Ministry of University and Research, a ministry of the Italian government
- Mouvements Unis de la Résistance, a French Resistance group active from 1943
- MUR (shipping), an international shipping company founded in 1994 and headquartered in the Netherlands
- M.U.R., a Lebanese resistance group in the 1990s
- Criminal Investigation Department (Russian: МУР, Московский уголовный розыск) of the Moscow City Police
- Artistic Ukrainian Movement (Ukrainian: МУР, Мистецький український рух), a Ukrainian displaced persons' literary organisation active 1945-1948

== See also ==
- Le Mur (disambiguation)
- Murs (disambiguation)
- Mura (disambiguation)
- Murre (bird)
