= Miura (surname) =

- Pronunciation: Miura

Origin
- Origin: Japanese
- Region of origin: Japanese

Miura (written: 三浦) is a Japanese surname. Notable people with the surname include:

- Ayako Miura (三浦 綾子; 1922–1999), Japanese author
- Miura Gorō (三浦 梧楼; 1847–1926), Japanese lieutenant general
- Daichi Miura (三浦 大知; born 1987), Japanese singer and dancer
- Gota Miura (三浦 豪太; born 1969), Japanese freestyle skier
- Haruma Miura (三浦 春馬; 1990–2020), Japanese actor
- Hiroki Miura (三浦 宏規; born 1999), Japanese stage actor
- Hiromitsu Miura (三浦広光; born 1981), Japanese mixed martial artist
- Hiroshi Miura (三浦 広司; born 1966), Japanese swimmer
- Hiroyuki Miura (ice hockey) (三浦 浩幸; born 1973), Japanese professional ice hockey defenceman
- Hiroyuki Miura (shogi) (三浦 弘行; born 1974), Japanese shogi player
- Kazuyoshi Miura (三浦 知良; born 1967), Japanese football player
- Kazuyoshi Miura (businessman) (三浦 和義; 1947–2008), Japanese suspected murderer
- Keizo Miura (三浦 敬三; 1904–2006), Japanese skier
- Kentaro Miura (三浦 建太郎; 1966–2021), Japanese manga artist
- Kōryō Miura (三浦 公亮; born 1930), Japanese astrophysicist, inventor, and origamist
- Kouji Miura (三浦 糀; born 1995), Japanese manga artist
- Kunihiro Miura (三浦 国宏; born 1962), Japanese boxer
- Masako Miura (三浦 雅子; born 1959), Japanese voice actress
- Mei Miura (三浦 芽依; born 1998), Japanese ice hockey player
- Midori Miura (三浦 みどり; 1947–2012), Japanese translator
- Miyuki Miura (三浦 美幸; born 1949), Japanese karateka
- Naoko Miura (三浦 直子; born 1959), Japanese swimmer
- Narumi Miura (三浦 成美; born 1997), Japanese women's footballer
- Nobuyoshi Miura (三浦 信由; born 1944), Japanese middle-distance runner
- Riki Miura (三浦 力; born 1983), Japanese actor
- Riku Miura (三浦 璃来; born 2001), Japanese pair skater
- Robert M. Miura (1938–2018), mathematician
- Shinji Miura (三浦 伸二; born 1975), Japanese bobsledder
- Shion Miura (三浦 しをん; born 1979), Japanese author
- Shumon Miura (三浦 朱門; 1926–2017), Japanese writer
- Takayuki Miura (三浦 孝之; born 1967), Japanese ice hockey player
- Tamaki Miura (三浦 環; 1884–1946), Japanese opera singer
- Tomokazu Miura (三浦 友和; born 1952), Japanese actor
- Toshiya Miura (三浦 俊也; born 1963), Japanese footballer and manager
- Tsutomu Miura (三浦 つとむ; 1911–1989), Japanese linguist
- Yuichiro Miura (三浦 雄一郎; born 1932), Japanese alpinist and skier
- Yuji Miura (三浦 裕司), Japanese ski mountaineer and trail runner

== See also ==
- Mura (surname)
