= Muzan =

Muzan (Persian: موزان or موزن) may refer to:

- Muzan, Khuzestan (موزان - Mūzān)
- Muzan, Ahvaz (موزان - Mūzān), Khuzestan Province
- Muzan, Sistan and Baluchestan (موزن - Mūzan)
- Muzan Kibutsuji, a character in the manga series Demon Slayer: Kimetsu no Yaiba.
