= Heavy-lift launch vehicle =

Launch vehicle capable of lifting over 20,000 kg into low Earth orbit

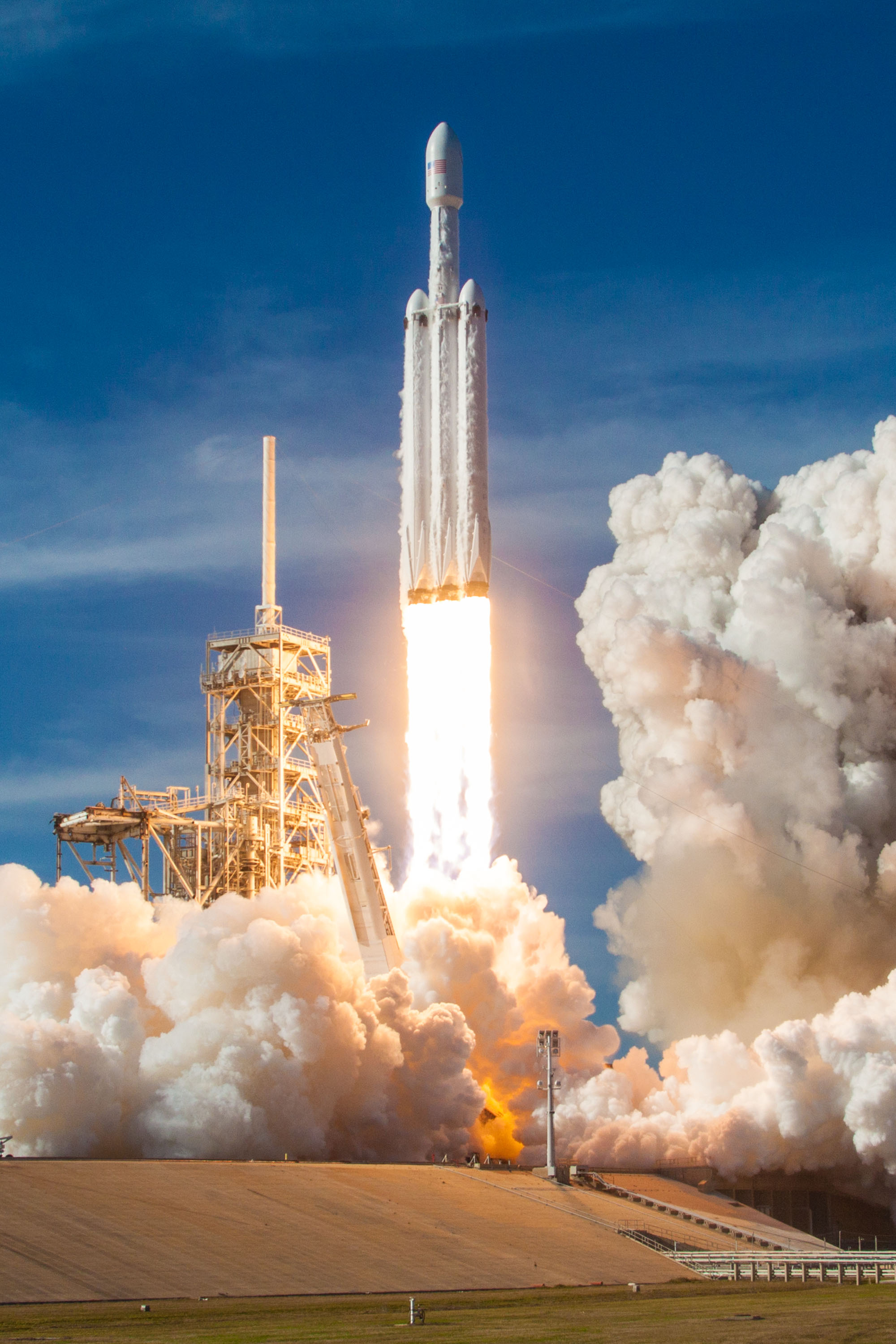
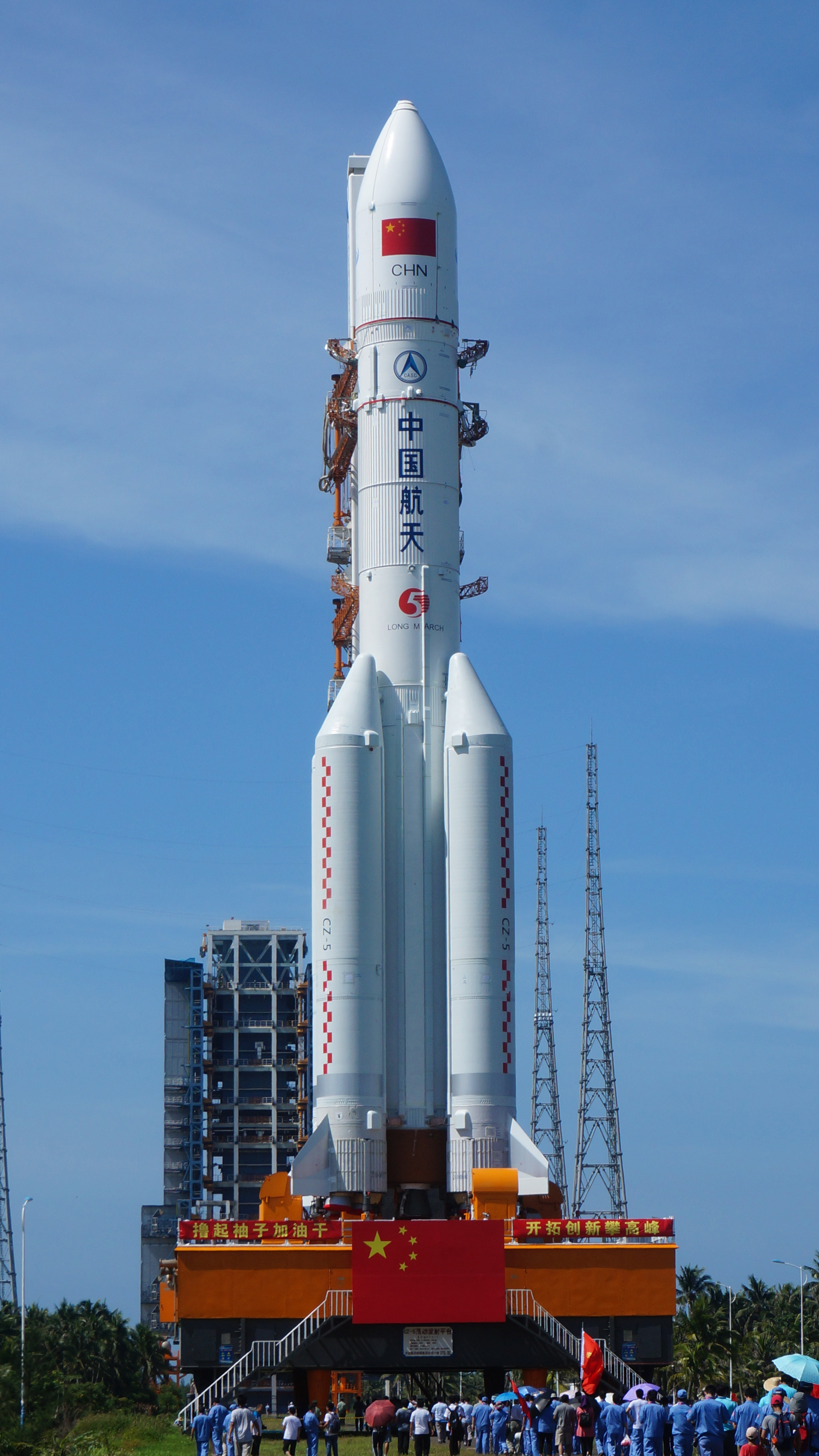
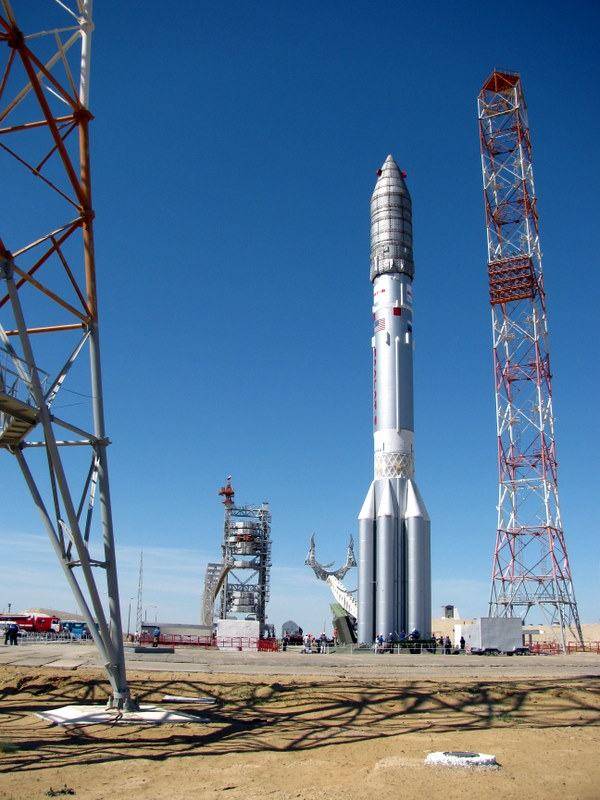
- From left: Falcon Heavy, Long March 5, Proton-M

Class overview
- Name: Heavy-lift launch vehicle
- Preceded by: Medium-lift launch vehicle
- Succeeded by: Super heavy-lift launch vehicle
- Built: Since 1966

General characteristics
- Capacity: 20,000 to 50,000 kg (44,000 to 110,000 lb)

A heavy-lift launch vehicle (HLV) is an orbital launch vehicle capable of lifting payloads between 20,000 to 50,000 kg (44,000 to 110,000 lb) (by NASA classification) or between 20,000 to 100,000 kilograms (44,000 to 220,000 lb) (by Russian classification) into low Earth orbit (LEO). Heavy-lift launch vehicles often carry payloads into higher-energy orbits, such as geosynchronous transfer orbit (GTO) or heliocentric orbit (HCO). An HLV is between a medium-lift launch vehicle and a super heavy-lift launch vehicle.

== History and design ==
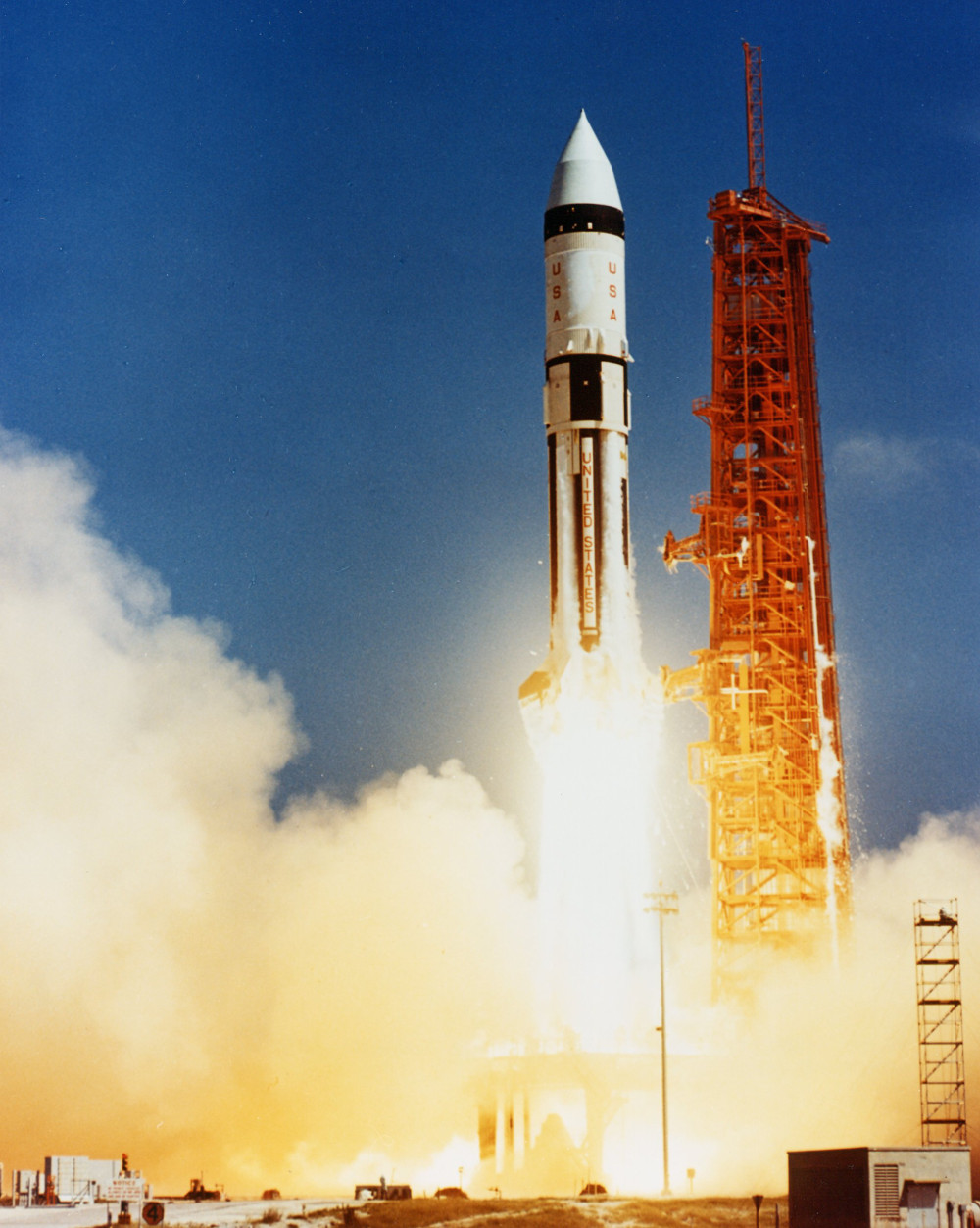
Launch of AS-203, an uncrewed Saturn IB

=== Government ===
The first heavy-lift launch vehicles in the 1960s included the US Saturn IB and the Soviet Proton. Saturn IB was designed to carry the Apollo spacecraft into orbit and had increased engine thrust and a redesigned second stage from its predecessor. Proton was originally designed to be a large intercontinental ballistic missile (ICBM). Russia still operates variants of the Proton as of 2026, although it is expected to be phased out in favor of the Angara A5.

NASA introduced the Space Shuttle as the first partially reusable launch vehicle in 1981. The Space Shuttle carried up to eight crew members in addition to deploying heavy payloads to LEO, including space station modules and Department of Defense payloads. Higher-energy orbits for payloads were reached through the use of a kick stage such as the Inertial Upper Stage.

The United States Air Force (USAF) operated the Titan IV to supplement Space Shuttle launches. This was derived from the Titan family of ICBMs and launch vehicles, with upgrades including solid rocket boosters (SRBs), vehicle lengthening, and an optional third stage. The USAF began the Evolved Expendable Launch Vehicle (EELV) program in 1994 to ensure access to space through contracted launch providers. This led to the development of the Delta IV, with the heavy variant using three first stage cores. United Launch Alliance (ULA) introduced Vulcan Centaur in 2024 as the successor to its Delta IV and Atlas V rockets, with Vulcan featuring a single, wider core and optional SRBs.

China's Long March 5 was introduced in 2016 as the most powerful version of the Long March family. It is notable as a Chinese launch vehicle using non-hypergolic liquid propellants.

=== Commercial ===
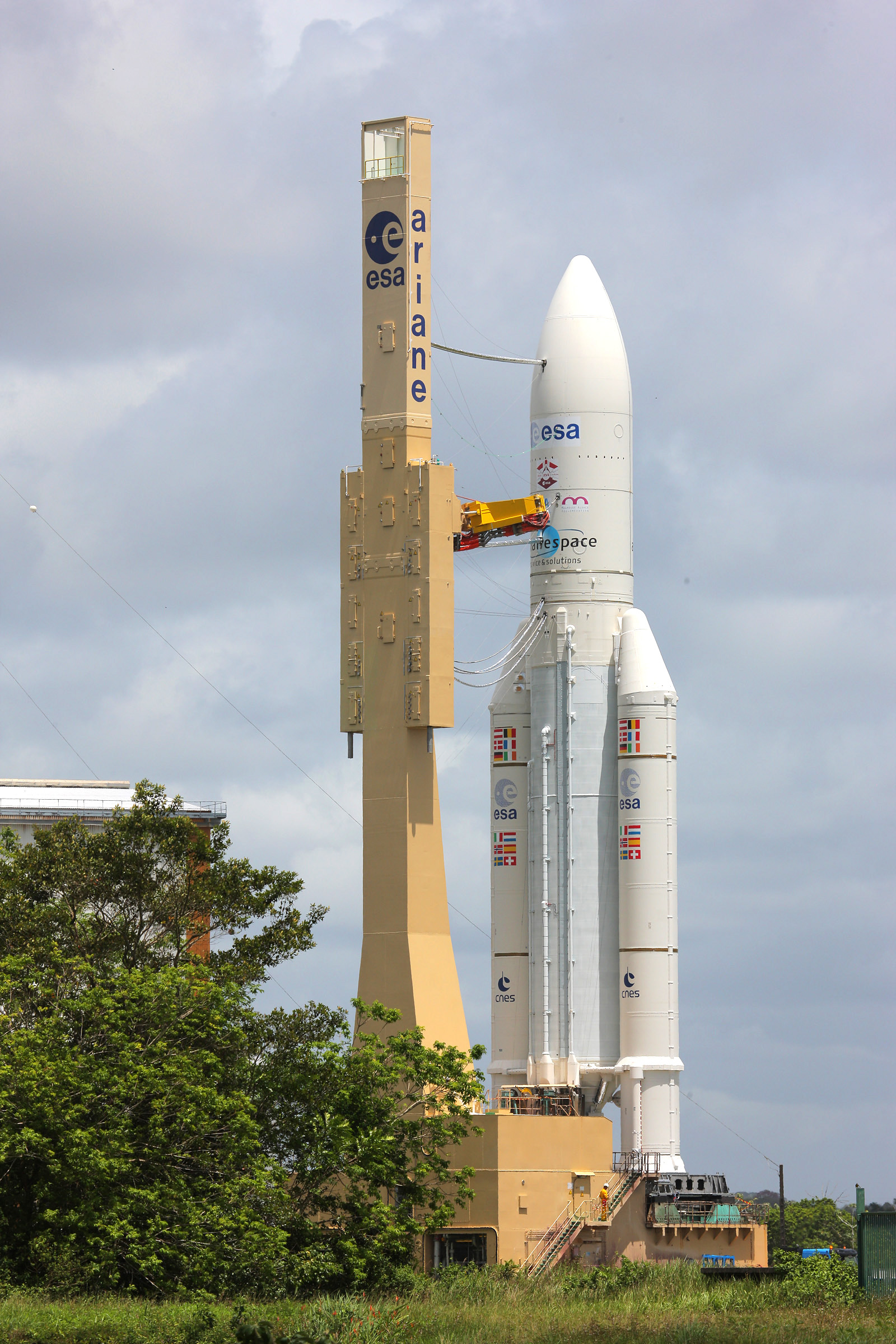
Ariane 5ES carrying ATV-004

The European Ariane 5 first flew in 1996 and launched many commercial payloads to GTO. It benefited in this role by launching from Guiana Space Center, a spaceport near the equator in French territory. Ariane 5 often carried multiple payloads per launch and set records for mass to GTO delivered for commercial payloads.

Falcon 9 was introduced by SpaceX in 2010, designed as a medium-lift launch vehicle with a reusable first stage. (Note: The first successful landing of a Falcon 9 first stage occurred in 2015) Falcon 9 grew more capable through iterative design, with upgrades including improved Merlin engines and the lengthening of both stages. Since the introduction of Falcon 9 Full Thrust in 2015, the vehicle meets the capacity requirements of a heavy-lift vehicle when the first stage is expended. In 2021, Falcon 9 carried a record of 143 satellites into orbit on a single launch. Falcon Heavy uses three first stage boosters similarly to Delta IV Heavy, but requires a strengthened center core. Falcon Heavy made its first flight in 2017 and was the most capable operational launch vehicle until NASA's SLS launched in 2022. Falcon Heavy is categorized as a heavy-lift launch vehicle when flown in configuration to recover the center core and both side boosters. When expending the center core or all boosters, its payload to LEO exceeds 50,000 kg, qualifying Falcon Heavy as a super heavy-lift launch vehicle.

== Rated launch vehicles ==
Rocket	Configuration	Organization	Nationality	Liftoff thrust	Mass to LEO	Maiden successful flight	Heaviest known launch			Status	Reusable	Launches (success / total)	Cost per launch (adjusted for inflation)	Cost per Kg to LEO
Rocket	Configuration	Organization	Nationality	Liftoff thrust	Mass to LEO	Maiden successful flight	...to LEO or MEO	...to GTO or GSO	...to HEO and beyond	Status	Reusable	Launches (success / total)	Cost per launch (adjusted for inflation)	Cost per Kg to LEO
Saturn IB		NASA	United States	7,100 kN (1,600,000 lbf)	21,000 kg (46,000 lb)	1966	20,847 kg (45,960 lb)	—N/a	—N/a	Retired (1975)	No	9 / 9	US$413 million	$19,667
Proton	K	Khrunichev	Soviet Union; Russia	10,470 kN (2,350,000 lb_{f})	19,760 kg (43,560 lb) (Note: Proton-K is considered to be a heavy-lift launch vehicle)	1967	22,776 kg (50,212 lb)	4,723 kg (10,412 lb)	6,220 kg (13,710 lb)	Retired (2017)	No	275 / 310	US$65 million	$3,289
Proton	M	Khrunichev	Russia	10,532 kN (2,368,000 lb_{f})	23,000 kg (51,000 lb)	2001	20,350 kg (44,860 lb)	6,740 kg (14,860 lb)	3,755 kg (8,278 lb)	Operational	No	105 / 116	US$65 million	$2,826
Space Shuttle		United Space Alliance (USA)	United States	28,750 kN (6,460,000 lb_{f})	27,500 kg (60,600 lb) (Note: excluding orbiter mass)	1981	22,753 kg (50,162 lb)	Classified (Note: Actual payloads flown are classified under the NRO launch program.) (Note: The Space Shuttle deployed payloads with an attached Inertial Upper Stage to reach orbits beyond LEO)	3,455 kg (7,617 lb)	Retired (2011)	Partially	133 / 135	US$601 million	$21,855
Titan IV		Lockheed Martin	United States	15,120 kN (3,400,000 lb_{f})	21,380 kg (47,130 lb)	1989	≥ 19,600 kg (43,200 lb) (Note: KH-11 launches had 19,600 kg)	Classified	5,712 kg (12,593 lb)	Retired (2005)	No	35 / 39	US$432 million	$20,206
Ariane 5	ECA/ES	Ariane Group	Europe	15,175 kN (3,411,000 lb_{f})	21,000 kg (46,000 lb)	1998	20,293 kg (44,738 lb)	11,210 kg (24,710 lb)	6,161.4 kg (13,584 lb)	Retired (2023)	No	90 / 92	US$200 million	$9,524
Delta IV Heavy		ULA	United States	9,420 kN (2,120,000 lb_{f})	28,790 kg (63,470 lb)	2007	21,000 kg (46,000 lb)	Classified	685 kg (1,510 lb)	Retired (2024)	No	15 / 16	US$350 million	$12,157
Angara A5	Angara-A5	Khrunichev, KBKhA	Russia	9,600 kN (2,200,000 lb_{f})	24,500 kg (54,000 lb)	2014	—N/a	2,400 kg (5,300 lb)	—N/a	Operational	No	4 / 5	US$100 million (2021)	$4,082
Angara A5	Angara-A5V	Khrunichev, Polyot	Russia	9,600 kN (2,200,000 lb_{f})	38,000 kg (84,000 lb)	—N/a	—N/a	—N/a	—N/a	Under development	No	—	?	
Falcon 9 FT	Expended	SpaceX	United States	7,600 kN (1,700,000 lb_{f})	22,800 kg (50,300 lb)	2017	17,400 kg (38,400 lb)	7,076 kg (15,600 lb)	1,108 kg (2,443 lb)	Operational	No	30 / 30	US$69.7 million	$3,057
Long March 5/5B		CALT	China	10,636 kN (2,391,000 lb_{f})	25,000 kg (55,000 lb)	2016	23,200 kg (51,100 lb)	14,000 kg (31,000 lb)	8,350 kg (18,410 lb)	Operational	No	16 / 17	US$160 million	$6,400
Falcon Heavy	Recoverable boosters and first stage	SpaceX	United States	22,800 kN (5,100,000 lb_{f})	>38,000 kg (84,000 lb)	2018	3,700 kg (8,200 lb)	~9,200 kg (20,300 lb)	~1,250 kg (2,760 lb)	Operational	Partially	3 / 3	US$95 million	> $2,500
Starship	Block 1	SpaceX	United States	69,627 kN (15,653,000 lb_{f})	15,000 kg (33,000 lb) (Note: Payload if both stages reserve propellant for landing tests. Payload would be significantly larger when both stages are discarded.)	2024	—N/a	—N/a	—N/a	Retired (2024)	No	4 / 6	—N/a	—N/a
Starship	Block 2	SpaceX	United States	69,627 kN (15,653,000 lb_{f})	35,000 kg (77,000 lb)	2025	—N/a	—N/a	—N/a	Retired (2025)	Partially	2 / 5	—N/a	—N/a
Vulcan Centaur	VC4	ULA	United States	13,137 kN (2,953,000 lb_{f})	21,400 kg (47,200 lb)	2025	—N/a	1,250 kg (2,760 lb)	—N/a	Operational	Planned (partial)	2 / 2	US$110 million	$5,140
Vulcan Centaur	VC6	ULA	United States	17,259 kN (3,880,000 lb_{f})	27,200 kg (60,000 lb)	—N/a	—N/a	—N/a	—N/a	Under development	Planned (partial)	—	US$110 million	$4,044
New Glenn		Blue Origin	United States	17,100 kN (3,800,000 lb_{f})	45,000 kg (99,000 lb)	2025	6,100 kg (13,400 lb)	—N/a	1,070 kg (2,360 lb)	Operational	Partial	2 / 3	US$68-110 million	$1,511-2,444
Ariane 6	A64	Ariane Group	Europe	15,370 kN (3,460,000 lb_{f})	21,650 kg (47,730 lb)	2026	~20,000 kg (44,000 lb)	—N/a	—N/a	Operational	Planned (partially)	2 / 2	US$133 million	$6,143
Long March 12B (Note: when first stage is recovered Long March 12B is considered a Medium-lift launch vehicle)		CALT	China	7,515 kN (1,689,000 lb_{f})	20,000 kg (44,000 lb)	2026	—N/a	—N/a	—N/a	Operational	Planned (partially)	1 / 1	?	
Zhuque-3E		LandSpace	China	9,000 kN (2,000,000 lb_{f})	21,300 kg (47,000 lb)	—N/a	—N/a	—N/a	—N/a	Under development	Planned (partially)	—	?	
Gravity-2		Orienspace	China	?	21,000 kg (46,000 lb)	—N/a	—N/a	—N/a	—N/a	Under development	Planned (partially)	—	?	
Terran R		Relativity Space	United States	15,480 kN (3,480,000 lb_{f})	33,500 kg (73,900 lb)	—N/a	—N/a	—N/a	—N/a	Under development	Planned (partially)	—	?	
NGLV	NGLV	ISRO	India	?	23,000 kg (51,000 lb)	—N/a	—N/a	—N/a	—N/a	Under development	Planned (partially)	—	?	
NGLV	NGLV-H	ISRO	India	?	31,700 kg (69,900 lb)	—N/a	—N/a	—N/a	—N/a	Under development	Planned (partially)	—	?	
Miura Next Heavy	Expended	PLD Space	Spain	16,600 kN (3,700,000 lb_{f})	36,000 kg (79,000 lb)	—N/a	—N/a	—N/a	—N/a	Under development	Planned (partially)	—	?	

== See also ==
- Comparison of orbital launch systems
- Comparison of orbital rocket engines
- Comparison of space station cargo vehicles
- List of orbital launch systems
- Sounding rocket, suborbital launch vehicle
- Small-lift launch vehicle, capable of lifting up to 2,000 kg (4,400 lb) to low Earth orbit
- Medium-lift launch vehicle, capable of lifting between 2,000 and 20,000 kg (4,400 and 44,100 lb) to low Earth orbit
- Super heavy-lift launch vehicle, capable of lifting more than 50,000 kg (110,000 lb) to Low Earth orbit
