= Mura =

Mura or MURA may refer to:

== Places ==
- Mura (Drava), a river in Austria, Hungary, Slovenia and Croatia
- Mura (Angara), a river in Russia
- Mura, Spain, a municipality near Barcelona, Catalonia
- Mura, Lombardy, a comune near Brescia, Italy
- Mura Statistical Region, in Slovenia

== People ==
- Mura, mother of Chandragupta Maurya, the founder of the Maurya Empire in ancient India
- Mura (actor) (born 1969), Filipino actor and comedian
- Saint Mura (c. 550–645), abbot of the monastery at Fahan, County Donegal, Ireland
- Mura (surname)
- Munda people of Tripura, India, also known as Mura
- Mura people, an indigenous people in Brazil

== Science and technology ==
- UDP-N-acetylglucosamine enolpyruvyl transferase (MurA), an enzyme
- Mura (cicada), a genus of cicadas
- Modified Uniformly Redundant Array (MURA), a type of mask used in coded aperture imaging

== Sport ==
- ND Mura 05, a defunct Slovenian football club
- NK Mura, a defunct Slovenian football club
- NŠ Mura, a Slovenian football club

== Other uses ==
- Mura (Japanese term), meaning unevenness or inconsistency in physical matter or human spiritual condition
- Edo-period village (Mura), in Japanese history
- Mura, an extinct member of the family of Muran languages
- Mura, the Australian Institute of Aboriginal and Torres Strait Islander Studies online catalogue
- Midwestern Universities Research Association (MURA), from 1953 to 1967
- Mura (danava), a demon in Hindu scriptures
- Mura (film), a 2024 Indian Malayalam-language film

== See also ==
- Miura (disambiguation)
- Mur (disambiguation)
- Muras (disambiguation)
- Muran (disambiguation)
