= Miura =

Miura may refer to:

== Places in Japan ==
- Miura, Kanagawa
  - Miurakaigan Station, a railway station, Miura
- Miura District, Kanagawa
- Miura Peninsula

== People ==
- Miura (surname)
- Miura clan, Japanese descended clan of the Taira
- Miura Anjin, honorific title of William Adams (1564–1620)
- Miura Gorō (1847–1926), lieutenant general in the Imperial Japanese Army
- Haruma Miura (1990–2020), Japanese actor, singer and model
- Kentaro Miura (1966–2021), Japanese manga artist and author
- Kazuyoshi Miura (born 1967), Japanese professional footballer

== Fictional characters ==
- Miura Haru, from Reborn!
- Miura Hayasaka, from Yotsuba&!
- Azusa Miura, a character from The Idolmaster
- Naoto Miura, from Clockwork Planet

== Science and technology ==
- Miura 1, suborbital rocket by the Spanish company PLD Space
- Miura 5, orbital recoverable rocket by the Spanish company PLD Space
- Miura fold, of paper
- Miura bull, a line within the Spanish Fighting Bull

== Other uses ==
- Lamborghini Miura, a sports car
- "Miura", a song from the self-titled album Metro Area
- Miura (restaurant), a Michelin-starred sushi restaurant in Beverly Hills, California

== See also ==
- Miguel Mihura (1905–1977), Spanish playwright
