= Miura Next =

European orbital recoverable rocket of the company PLD Space

- Function: partially reusable orbital launch vehicle
- Manufacturer: PLD Space
- Country of origin: Spain

Size
- Height: 60 m (200 ft)
- Diameter: 3.5 m (11 ft)
- Stages: 2

Capacity

Payload to Low Earth orbit (LEO)
- Mass: 13,580 kg (29,940 lb)

Payload to SSO
- Mass: 11,275 kg (24,855 lb)

Payload to GTO
- Mass: 4,595 kg (10,130 lb)

Launch history
- Status: Under development
- Launch sites: Guiana Space Centre (planned)
- First flight: Planned for 2030

First stage
- Diameter: 3.5 m (11 ft)
- Powered by: 5
- Maximum thrust: 5,530 kN (1,240,000 lb_{f})
- Propellant: LOX / RP-1

Second stage
- Powered by: 1
- Propellant: LOX / RP-1

The Miura Next is a future reusable medium-lift launch vehicle currently in development, part of PLD Space's program for the next 20 years. Designed to compete in the market of reusable launchers, it will allow for the transport of large payloads to low Earth orbits and beyond. With capabilities for crewed missions and reusable first stages, it aims to position itself as a European alternative to rockets like the Falcon 9. It is expected to work alongside the crewed capsule Lince, expanding the capabilities for space exploration and commercial ventures.

== Description ==
The rocket was introduced by PLD Space in October 2024 as part of their space program for the next two decades. The company, headquartered in Elche, Spain, revealed their new reusable heavy-lift rocket, targeting the first half of the 2030s for its maiden flight.

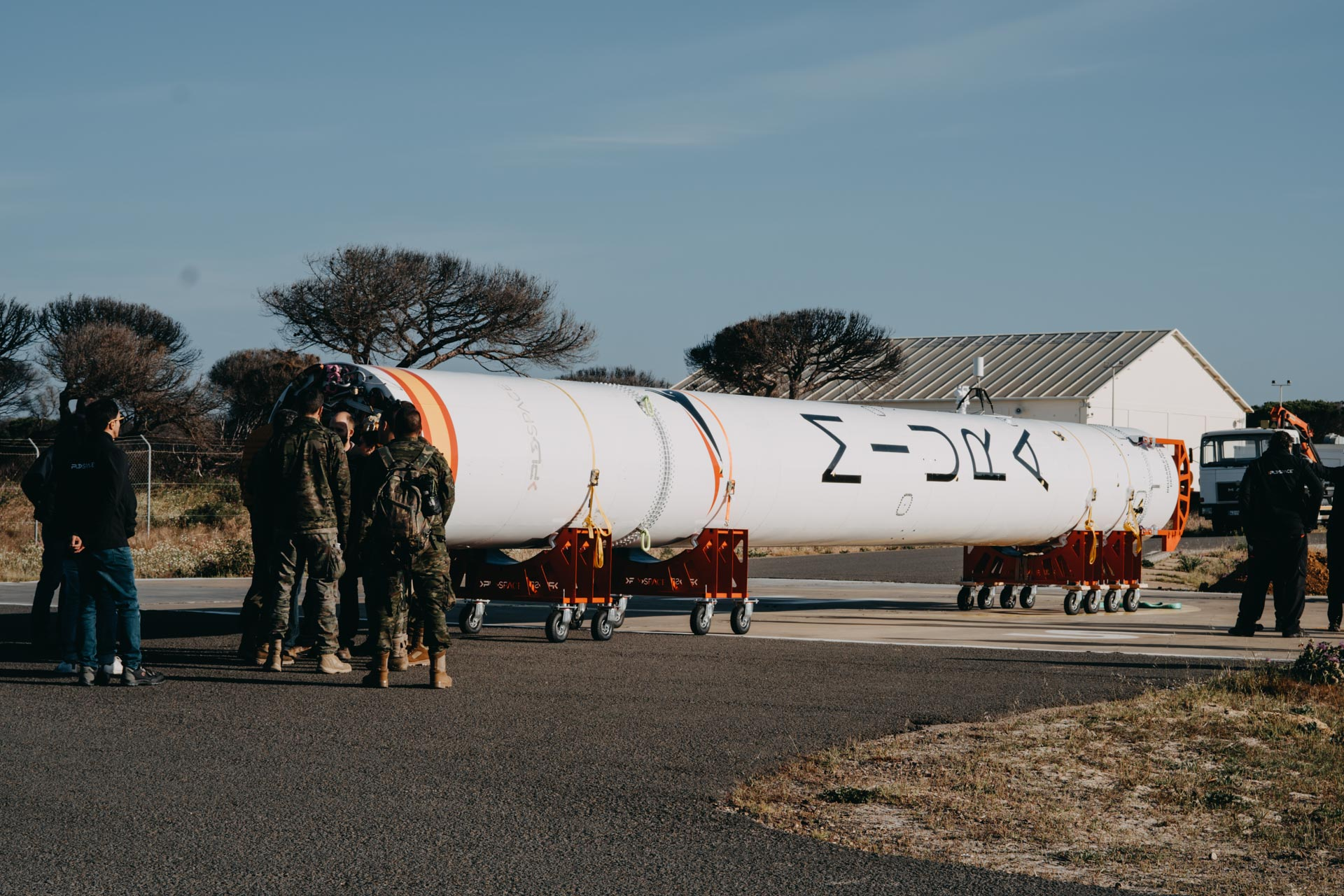
Reusability test of PLD Space's Miura 5 rocket.

Both the rocket and the crewed capsule Lince were developed in secrecy by the company until their development was made public during an event marking the anniversary of the first launch of Miura 1, which was expected to provide updates on the development of the Miura 5.

The Miura Next will be a reusable rocket that is part of PLD Space's new family of launchers. Versions currently named Miura Next Heavy and Super Heavy will be able to place up to 53 tons into low Earth orbit. Additionally, they will be capable of carrying between 2.4 and 16 tons to the Moon and Mars, depending on their configuration, which may include up to four booster engines that will also be reusable.

The first flight is expected in 2030, and by 2035, it is projected to be one of the most powerful rockets in the world, with scalable and reusable technology. It will also be the only one of its kind within the European Union, as the company aims to establish independence for the EU in terms of space travel.

== Capabilities ==
The following table lists the expected payload capabilities for the various vehicle configurations to different destinations.

Destination	Miura Next			Miura Next Heavy		Miura Next Super Heavy
Destination	Expendable	Reusable (barge)	Reusable (return to launch site)	Expendable	Reusable (Note: Side boosters reused. Core expended.)	Expendable
LEO (420 km)	13,580 kg	10,200 kg	6,650 kg	36,000 kg	19,500 kg	53,000 kg
SSO (500 km)	11,275 kg	8,300 kg	5,130 kg	30,580 kg	16,250 kg	–
GTO	4,595 kg	2,900 kg	1,100 kg	15,140 kg	7,160 kg	23,000 kg
Moon	–	–	–	–	–	16,695 kg
Mars	–	–	–	–	–	13,660 kg

== See also ==
- Miura 5
