= TEPREL =

Family of rocket engines designed and built by Spanish company PLD Space

TEPREL-C
- Country of origin: Spain
- Designer: PLD Space
- Manufacturer: PLD Space
- Application: Booster stage engines; Upper stage engine
- Predecessor: TEPREL-B
- Status: Testing

Liquid-fuel engine
- Propellant: LOX / RP-1
- Cycle: Gas-generator

Performance
- Thrust, vacuum: 75 kN (17,000 lbf)
- Thrust, sea-level: 190 kN (43,000 lbf)
- Specific impulse, vacuum: 323 s (3169 m/s)

Used in
- Miura 5

TEPREL-B
- Country of origin: Spain
- Designer: PLD Space
- Manufacturer: PLD Space
- Predecessor: TEPREL-A
- Status: Active

Liquid-fuel engine
- Propellant: LOX / Jet-A1
- Mixture ratio: 2.35
- Cycle: Pressure-fed engine

Performance
- Thrust: 30.2 kN (6,800 lbf) kN
- Chamber pressure: 22 bar
- Burn time: 240 seconds

Used in
- Miura 1

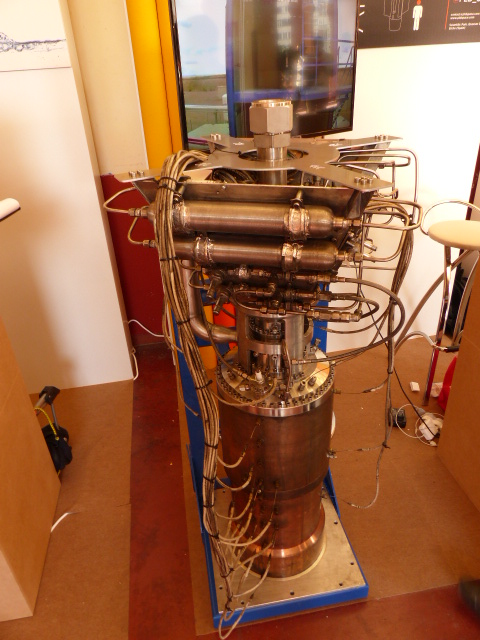
First TEPREL-DEMO motor created by PLD Space

TEPREL is a family of rocket engines designed and built by the Spanish aerospace company PLD Space for their Miura 1 and Miura 5 launch vehicles. The TEPREL engine, named after the Spanish reusable engine program that is financing its development, uses kerosene and liquid oxygen as propellants. So far, several versions of this engine, intended to propel Miura 1, have been developed and tested on the company's own liquid propulsion test facilities located in Teruel, Spain.

== Revisions ==
In the first versions of the engine the propellants are driven to the engine by using a pressure-fed cycle with helium. Later versions of the engine (TEPREL-C) incorporate a turbopump.

=== TEPREL-DEMO ===
The TEPREL-DEMO engine, originally called NetonVac1, was first tested in 2015. It is a calorimetric engine model, intended to demonstrate combustion stability as well as to acquire relevant information such as ignition and shut-down sequences, pressures and temperatures along the engine, thrust and propellant mass flow rates at different thrust profiles. Additionally, the engine served to test all associated hardware and software at PLD Space Propulsion Test Facilities. The engine is capable to produce a thrust of 28 kN at sea level.

=== TEPREL-A ===
With the TEPREL-A engine, first tested in 2017, the company included several design upgrades, such as a new combustion chamber design, an improved injector geometry and a regenerative cooling system. The later enables the engine to fire for nearly 2 minutes, which is the envisaged nominal functioning duration for the suborbital launch vehicle Miura 1. At sea level, the engine produces a thrust of 32 kN.

=== TEPREL-B ===
TEPREL-B is the first flight version of the TEPREL engine. Several design improvements have been implemented to reduce the overall weight of the engine. It is equipped with a thrust vector control system and a convergent-divergent nozzle, all regeneratively cooled. In May 2019 the first unit of this model was destroyed during a test. After a long investigation PLD Space concluded that the problem was due to excess pressure during engine start at ignition. PLD Space addressed the issue through a combination of improvements to the launch site infrastructure and procedural improvements. It is currently fully operational. In February 2020, PLD Space successfully completed a 122-second test that allowed it to achieve flight rating.

On August 28, 2020, PLD Space completed required tests for the thrust vector control system on the Teprel-B rocket engine.

=== TEPREL-C ===
Flight version of the TEPREL engine to be used in the Miura 5 rocket. Initially it was expected to produce 105.5 kN of thrust at sea level. Later expected thrust was increased to 190 kN.

=== TEPREL-C Vacuum ===
Version of TEPREL-C adapted to vacuum, and capable of re-ignition in microgravity conditions. Capable of 75 kN of thrust. It has specific impulse of 323 s.
