= Journal of Medical Ultrasonics =

Scientific journal

- Discipline: Medical ultrasonics
- Language: English
- Edited by: Hitoshi Maruyama

Publication details
- Former names: Medical Ultrasonics (1963–1974); Japanese Journal of Medical Ultrasonics (1974–1997)
- History: 1963–present
- Publisher: Springer, the Japan Society of Ultrasonics in Medicine (Japan)
- Frequency: Quarterly
- Open access: Yes
- Impact factor: 2.1 (2025)

Standard abbreviations
- ISO 4: J. Med. Ultrason.

Indexing
- ISSN: 1346-4523 (print); 1613-2254 (web)

Links
- Journal homepage; Online archive

Journal of Medical Ultrasonics is a peer-reviewed scientific journal published quarterly by Springer Science+Business Media on behalf of the Japan Society of Ultrasonics in Medicine. It covers advances on medical ultrasonics. Its current editor-in-chief is Hitoshi Maruyama (Juntendo University).

The journal was established as an English-language publication under the name Medical Ultrasonics in 1963. It was renamed as Japanese Journal of Medical Ultrasonics in 1974, accepting articles in English and Japanese. It was retitled to its current name in 1997 and became an English-only publication in 2001.

== Abstracting and indexing ==
The journal is abstracted and indexed in:

- Embase
- MEDLINE
- ProQuest databases
- Science Citation Index Expanded
- Scopus

According to the Journal Citation Reports, the journal has a 2025 impact factor of 2.7.
