= Muran =

Muran can refer to:

- Mura language, indigenous language of Brazil
- Muráň, a village in Slovakia
- Muráň Castle, a castle in the village in Slovakia
- Muran, Iran, a village in Iran
- Muran, Ardabil, a village in Iran
- Muran District, an administrative subdivision of Iran
- Muran Rural District, an administrative subdivision of Iran
- Muran (film), a 2011 Indian Tamil-language film
- Azathioprine, by trade name Muran
- Murano, an island in the Venetian Lagoon, known in local Venetian as "Muran"

== See also ==
- Moran (disambiguation)
- Mura (disambiguation)
