= LaMura =

LaMura is a surname. Notable people with the surname include:

- B. J. LaMura (born 1981), American-born baseball player
- Mark LaMura (1948–2017), American actor

== See also ==
- Mura (surname)
