= Mur, Iran =

Mur or Mowr (Persian: مور) may refer to:

- Mur, alternate Romanization of Mohr, Fars
- Mur-e Jowkar, a village in Kohgiluyeh and Boyer-Ahmad Province
- Mur, Razavi Khorasan
- Mowr, Yazd
