= Etlaq Spaceport =

Commercial spaceport in Oman

Coordinates: 18.7862°N 56.8220°E

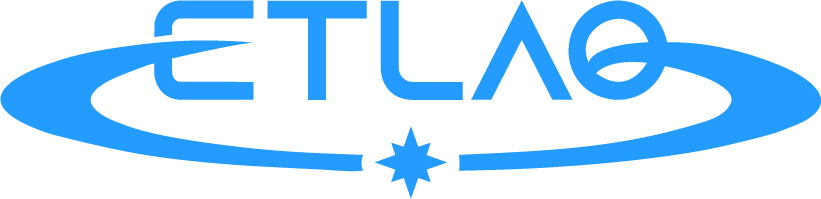
- Industry: Commercial Spaceport
- Founded: 2022; 4 years ago
- Founder: H.H. Azzan Kais Al Said
- Headquarters: Muscat, Oman
- Services: Launch Complexes; Static Testing; Vehicle Integration Units; Mission Control; Range Control; Warehousing and Storage; Logistics and Ground Support
- Parent: National Aerospace Services Company (NASCOM); Omantel
- Website: www.etlaq.om

Etlaq Spaceport is a commercial spaceport located near the Special Economic Zone of Duqm, Oman. It supports experimental suborbital campaigns under the Genesis Program and is planned to host orbital-class launch operations. It is designed to support spaceflight operations, including commercial satellite launches, research missions, and potential interplanetary exploration. The spaceport will include mission control facilities, range and safety control capabilities, and launch complexes for orbital and suborbital vehicles.

In 2025, Oman’s Civil Aviation Authority introduced Civil Aviation Directive CAD 5-01, establishing a regulatory pathway for launch approvals within the Muscat Flight Information Region.

== History ==
The concept behind Etlaq Spaceport was publicly announced in January 2023 by the National Aerospace Services Company (NASCOM), signalling Oman's intent to join the global space-launch industry and establish a domestic launch-infrastructure hub. During the first Middle East Space Conference hosted in Oman in January 2024, Etlaq disclosed a strategic partnership with the national telecom operator Omantel, to enhance spaceport infrastructure and connectivity.

By 2024, the project had advanced from conceptual design into construction of early infrastructure. Oman's favourable geography and the Duqm Free Zone's logistics ecosystem were cited as key enablers in the site selection process. In December 2024, Etlaq successfully conducted the DUQM-1 sub-orbital flight, marking the first launch event from Oman's commercial space-launch facility.

In October 2025, Oman's CAA published CAD 5-01, the regulatory directive enabling commercial launch window approvals. This legislation was heralded as a milestone for the regional launch-industry ecosystem, positioning Etlaq as one of the fastest-approval launch sites globally. By mid-2025, the spaceport leadership announced a formal target of full commercial operations by 2027, including multiple launch complexes and an expanded multi-pad facility.

== Launches ==
In December 2024, Etlaq launched its first experimental rocket, named "Duqm-1". The launch took place from the Etlaq Spaceport in Oman, with support from the Ministry of Transport, Communications and Information Technology (MTCIT), the National Space Program, the Civil Aviation Authority, NASCOM, and other institutional stakeholders. The launch occurred at 10:05 AM local time from a site south of the Wilayat of Duqm, located at coordinates 18 degrees north and 56 degrees east.

== Collaborations ==
In June 2024, Etlaq Spaceport, with support from the Civil Aviation Authority (CAA) of Oman, signed a Memorandum of Understanding (MoU) with ABL Space Systems.

== Regulations ==
Civil Aviation Directive CAD 5-01

In August 2025, Oman's Civil Aviation Authority published a directive establishes a formal regulatory framework for commercial space-launch operations within the Muscat Flight Information Region (FIR). Under CAD 5-01, launch-service providers must submit an evidence-based safety case documenting trajectory, hazard zones, maritime/air-traffic coordination, range-safety and environmental impact considerations. The directive targets launch-window approvals in as little as 45 days and places no annual cap on the number of launches per provider or spaceport.

CAD 5-01 brings Oman into alignment with international aviation-and-space safety practices while offering a more responsive scheduling environment than many established spaceports. This regulatory clarity is a core component of Etlaq’s value proposition to global launchers: responsive launch access, a clear single-window regulatory path and a host-state framework designed for rapid commercialisation.

== Operations ==
Experimental and Test Campaigns

Etlaq's initial operational phase is structured under its “Genesis Programme”, which focuses on enabling frequent sub-orbital and small-orbital-class missions while the full orbital facility is developed. The first launch under this programme, DUQM-1, took place in December 2024 and validated the range-safety exclusion area, telemetry/integration infrastructure and ground-system readiness.

In July 2025, the DUQM-2 mission (with partner Stellar Kinetics and its Kea-1 vehicle) was scheduled for liftoff. While ignition was aborted due to an onboard actuator fault, the mission achieved operational readiness milestones: ground-system integration, range coordination, payload accommodation and pre-launch sequence execution.

Commercial and Future Launch Activity

Etlaq has announced a portfolio of five test launches planned for 2025, involving international partners from the UK (e.g., Advanced Rocket Technologies/ART), New Zealand, Portugal, and Kuwait. Among these, a strategic collaboration with Spanish launch-service provider PLD Space covers deployment of its Miura-5 vehicle, with the first flights from Oman anticipated as early as 2027. The spaceport's ability to cater to micro- and small-satellite orbital markets, and its favourable geographic latitude for fuel-efficient inclinations, appears as a differentiator in the marketplace.

== Community engagement ==
Recognising public interest and human capital development as core elements of its mission, Etlaq has instituted a "fan-zone" initiative, branded Etlaq FX, that allows members of the public and student groups to visit the facility (under safety supervision), witness launch operations, engage in STEM-oriented workshops (robotics, drawing competitions, "space passports") and follow mission briefings live. The fan-zone model is one of the first of its kind in the Middle East and forms a component of Oman’s broader strategy for workforce development and regional space-industry ecosystems.

== Collaborations and partnerships ==
Etlaq's business-development strategy emphasises multi-national cooperation, launch-service provider attraction and alignment with national policy frameworks. In 2024 and 2025 the spaceport announced several Memoranda of Understanding (MoUs) and strategic agreements: for example with domestic and international aerospace firms, telecommunications and ground-segment operators, and the national space programme. A key strategic agreement with PLD Space designates Etlaq as a second global launch base for its Miura rocket family, extending the company’s global footprint and providing a near-equatorial launch option for customers in the Eastern hemisphere.

Through such partnerships, Etlaq aims to catalyse regional supply-chain development, build local human capital in aerospace engineering and operations, and position Oman as a competitive node in the emerging global "NewSpace" economy.
