= Teruel Airport =

Public use airport near Teruel, Spain

Teruel Airport Aeropuerto de Teruel
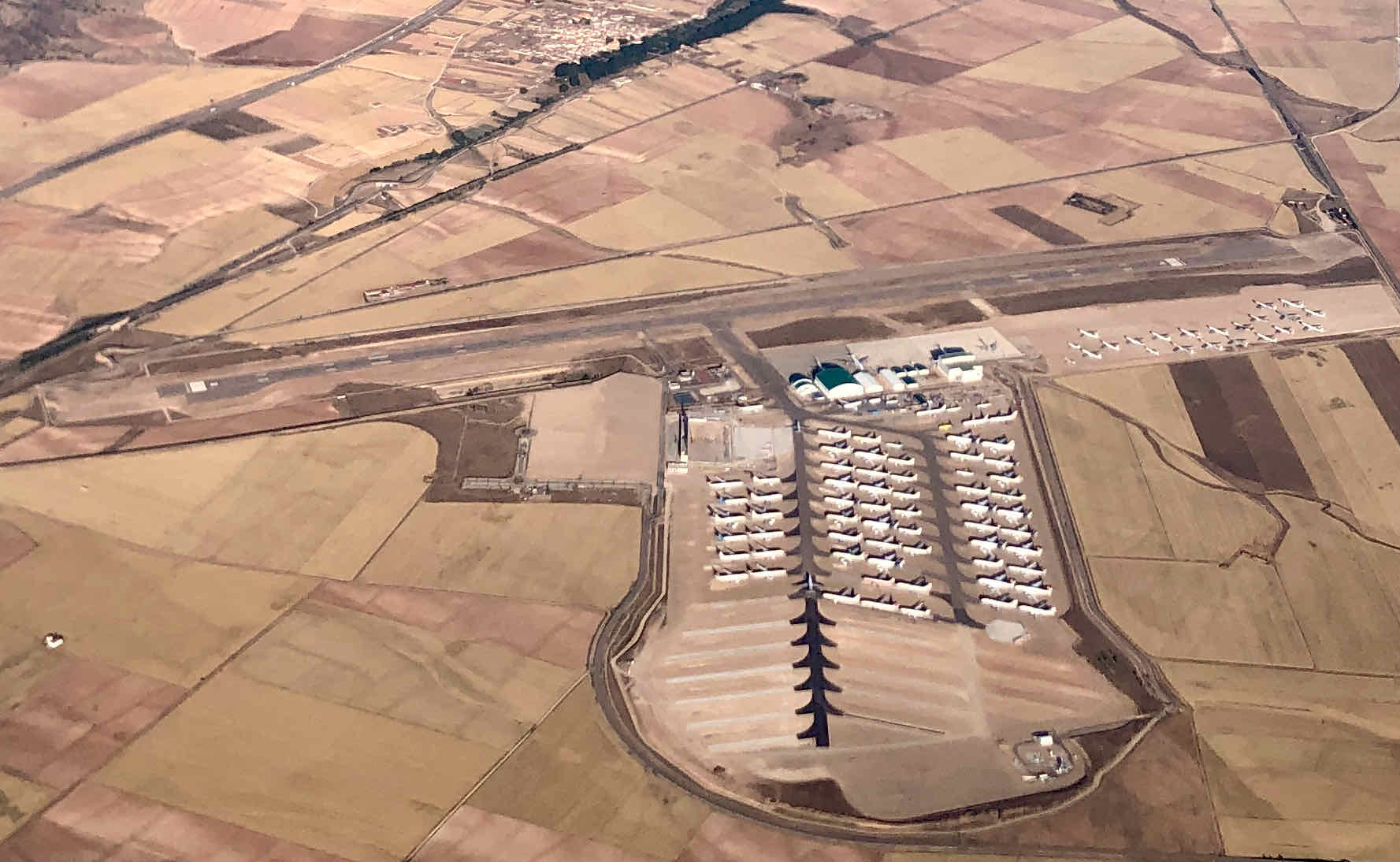
- Aerial view
- IATA: TEV; ICAO: LETL

Summary
- Airport type: Maintenance / Storage
- Location: Teruel, Teruel (province), Spain
- Opened: February 28, 2013
- Elevation AMSL: 3,367 ft / 1,026 m
- Coordinates: 40°24′43″N 01°13′3″W
- Website: www.aeropuertodeteruel.com

Map

Runways
Direction	Length		Surface
Direction	ft	m	Surface
18/36	9,268	2,825	Asphalt

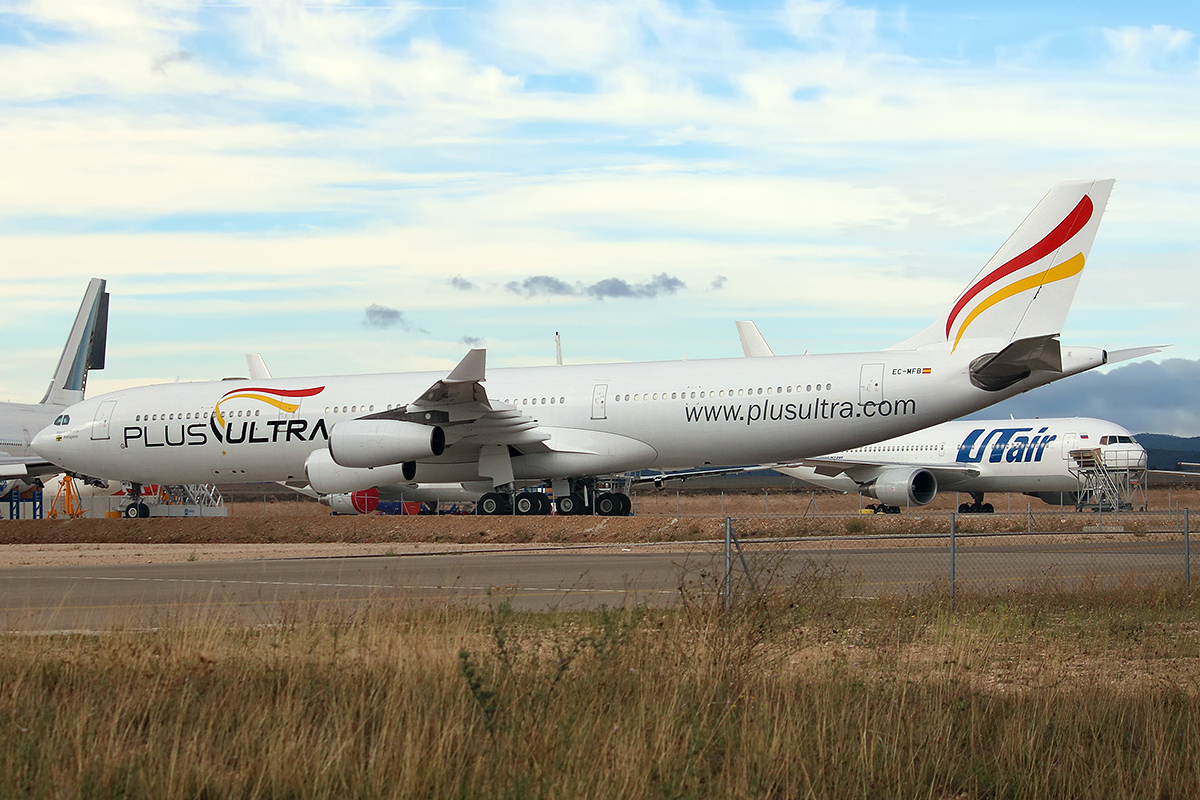
Plus Ultra Líneas Aéreas A340-300 at Teruel Airport

Teruel Airport (IATA: TEV, ICAO: LETL) is an airport near Teruel in the Teruel Province of Spain. Known under the commercial name Plataforma Aeroportuaria-Teruel (PLATA), it was certified for public use by the Spanish Aviation Safety and Security Agency (AESA) on 5 February 2013, after being repurposed from an original military airbase. Permission for air operations was granted by the AESA on 28 February 2013.

The airport serves as an aircraft maintenance and aircraft storage facility for the Tarmac Aerosave company, and has no passenger traffic.

The airport includes a main building with a control tower as well as a basic terminal, but is not equipped to handle passenger traffic. An aircraft rescue and firefighting (ARFF) station is located next to the terminal. Also on site are three main maintenance and part-removal hangars (the original one for Boeing 747s and the newest for Airbus A340s). PLATA is owned by a consortium formed by the Government of Aragon and Teruel City Council, and does not belong to Aena Group, the Spanish airports management company.

The dry climate makes the airport suitable for long-term aircraft storage, with capacity for 250 aircraft. During the COVID-19 pandemic, approximately 100 grounded planes were parked there.

== PLD Space Propulsion Test Facilities ==
In August 2018, Spanish launch service provider PLD Space signed a concession with the Teruel Airport Consortium for 13,337 m^{2} of space at the airport to test launch vehicle technology. The agreement covered 25 years, with an optional 10-year extension. PLD Space was to invest €1M in infrastructure for the construction of a new control room, offices, access paths, a rocket engine maintenance hangar and a new test bench to test its Miura 1 rocket. Over the previous three years, testing had been conducted at the airport on a short-term contract basis.

== See also ==
- 309th Aerospace Maintenance and Regeneration Group
