= Mura (surname) =

Mura is a surname. Notable people with the surname include:

- Andrea Mura (born 1964), Italian politician
- Corinna Mura (1910–1965). American cabaret singer
- David Mura (born 1952), Japanese-American author, poet, novelist, playwright, critic and performance artist
- Éric Mura (born 1963), French retired footballer
- Facundo Mura (born 1999), Argentine footballer
- Frank Mura (1861–?), French-born American painter and water colourist
- Gambhir Singh Mura (1930–2002), Indian tribal dancer
- Gianni Mura (1945–2020), Italian sports journalist
- Giuseppe Mura (born 1943), Italian boxer
- Roberto Mura (born 1955), Italian politician and businessman
- Steve Mura (born 1955), American baseball player
- Takahito Mura (born 1991), Japanese figure skater
- Takashi Mura (born 1960), Japanese figure skater
- Toshio Mura (1925–2009), professor of engineering
- Facundo Mura (born 1999), Argentine professional footballer

== See also ==
- Miura (surname)
- LaMura, surname
