= Gota Miura =

Japanese freestyle skier (born 1969)

Personal information
- Nationality: Japanese
- Born: 10 August 1969 (age 56) Kamakura, Japan

Sport
- Sport: Freestyle skiing

Gota Miura (三浦 豪太, Miura Gōta; born 10 August 1969) is a Japanese freestyle skier. He competed at the 1994 Winter Olympics in Lillehammer and the 1998 Winter Olympics in Nagano, placing 27th and 13th, respectively, in freestyle moguls. His father, Yūichirō Miura, son of Keizo Miura, was the first person to ski down Mt. Everest, and set the record for the oldest person to climb the mountain. Gota joined his father on at least on his father's first and third ascents of Everest. Gota Miura has a PhD in medicine and teaches at Keio University and he moved in with his father when his health began failing in his father's later years.

The Miura family has a strong connection to Utah. On 15 February 2004, Keizo Miura celebrated his 100th birthday with a ski descent together with more than 120 friends and family members, including four generations of his family, at Snowbird ski resort, Keizo's favorite ski resort, near Salt Lake City, Utah. (Note: Family members present in addition to Keizo (age 100) were: Keizo’s son Yūichirō (age 71), first grandson Yuta (age 38), second grandson Gota (age 34), Yuta’s wife Rie (age 31), great-granddaughter Rio (age 4, Yuta's daughter), and great-grandson Yuki (Age 1). It is uncertain if his first granddaughter Emiri (about age 36) was present.) All three of Yūichirō's children attended Rowmark Ski Academy in Salt Lake City. Gota graduated from Rowland Hall in 1988 in Salt Lake City. Yuta and Gota both graduated from the University of Utah, also in Salt Lake City. Gota earned his bachelor's degree in 2001 in sports physiology. Gota completed his PhD in 2012 with the Graduate School of Juntendo University, School of Medicine, with a major concentration in Genetic Expression Under Hypoxic Environment.
