= Le Mur =

Le Mur (The Wall) may refer to:

- Le Mur (urban art), urban art spot in Paris, France, active since 2000
- Le Mur, structure in Fermont, Quebec, Canada
- The Wall (short story collection), 1939 book by Jean-Paul Sartre
- The Wall (1967 film), French drama film by Serge Roullet.
- The Wall (1998 film), Belgian drama film by Alain Berliner.
- The Wall (2012 documentary film), French documentary film by Sophie Robert.
