= Keizo Miura =

Japanese ski mountaineer (1904–2006)

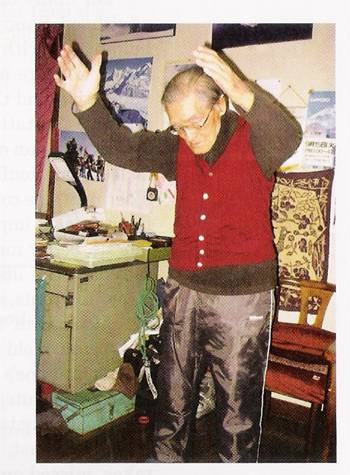
Keizo Miura, shown doing part of his daily exercise routine.

Keizo Miura (三浦 敬三, Miura Keizō; February 15, 1904 – January 5, 2006) was a Japanese skier who was born in Aomori. He was a skiing teacher and photographer of mountain landscapes. He was notable for his fitness and outdoor-sport undertakings at advanced age; at 77 he was the oldest person to climb Kilimanjaro and at 99 descended a Gletscher of Mont Blanc together with his oldest son Yūichirō and grandson Gota. Yūichirō Miura was also the oldest person to climb Mount Everest and the Himalayas, at age 70, at age 75 and later at age 80. Keizo Miura wrote two books on his health routine, one of them co-written with his physician.

The Miura family has a strong connection to Utah. On February 15, 2004, Keizo Miura celebrated his 100th birthday with a ski descent together with more than 120 friends and family members, including four generations of his family, at Snowbird ski resort, Keizo's favorite ski resort, near Salt Lake City, Utah. (Note: Family members present in addition to Keizo (age 100) were: Keizo’s son Yūichirō (age 71), first grandson Yuta (age 38), second grandson Gota (age 34), Yuta’s wife Rie (age 31), great-granddaughter Rio (age 4, Yuta's daughter), and great-grandson Yuki (Age 1). It is uncertain if his first granddaughter Emiri (about age 36) was present.) All three of Yūichirō's children attended Rowmark Ski Academy in Salt Lake City. Gota graduated from Rowland Hall in Salt Lake City. Yuta and Gota both graduated from the University of Utah, also in Salt Lake City.

Keizo died in 2006 at the age 101.
