= Miura 5 =

European orbital recoverable rocket of the company PLD Space

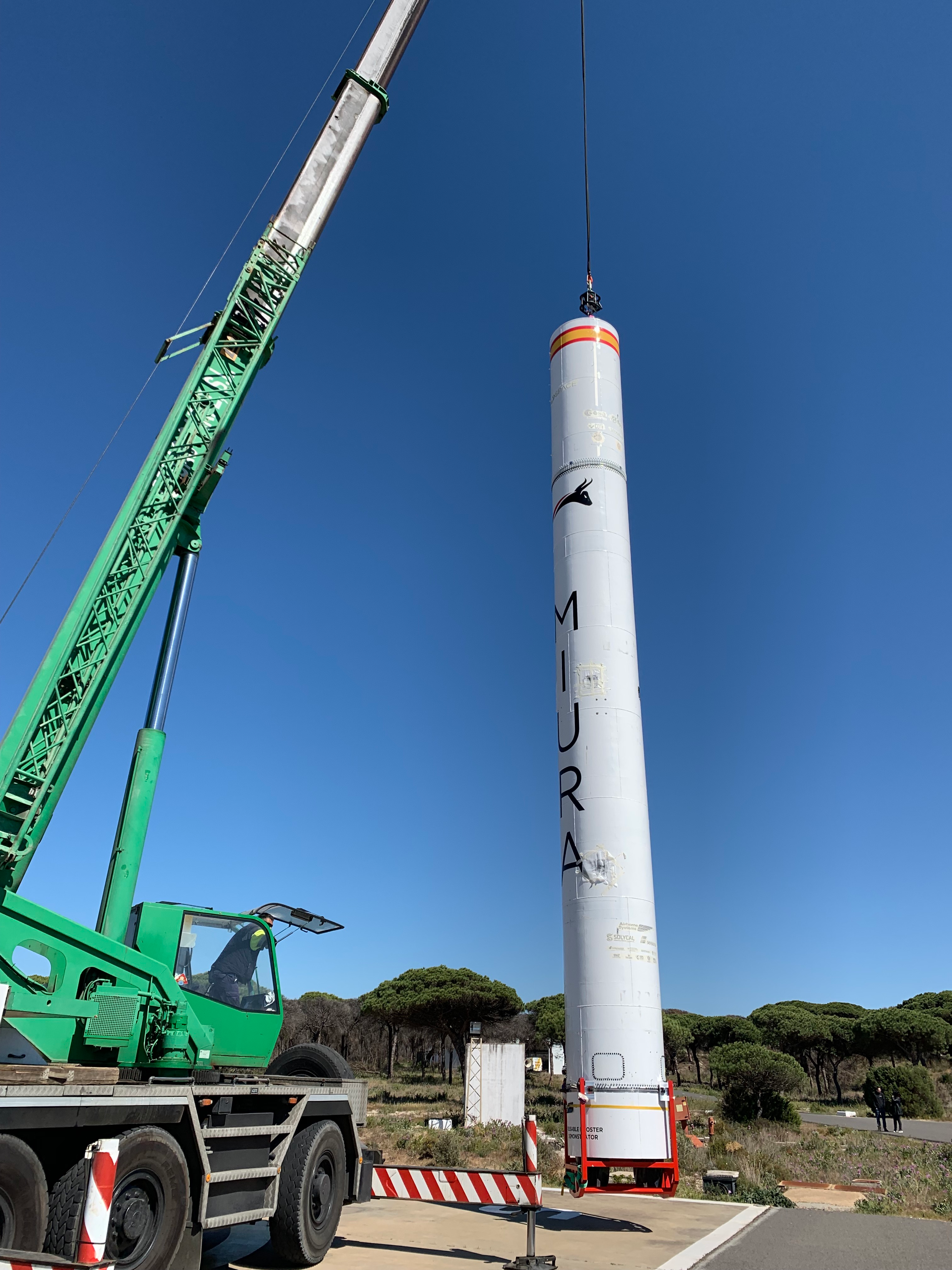
- A reuse test small-scale first stage of Miura 5 in El Arenosillo
- Function: partially reusable small-lift launch vehicle
- Manufacturer: PLD Space
- Country of origin: Spain

Size
- Height: 35.7 m (117 ft)
- Diameter: 2.0 m (6 ft 7 in)
- Mass: 69,025 kilogram
- Stages: 2–3

Capacity

Payload to Low Earth orbit (LEO)
- Mass: 1,080 kg (2,380 lb)

Payload to SSO
- Mass: 540 kg (1,190 lb)

Associated rockets
- Comparable: Maia, Shavit 2, Prime, Electron

Launch history
- Status: Under development
- Launch sites: Guiana Space Centre (planned); Etlaq Spaceport (planned); El Hierro Launch Centre (proposed); Azores (proposed)
- First flight: Q1 2026 (planned)

First stage
- Height: 26.3 m (86 ft)
- Diameter: 2.0 m (6 ft 7 in)
- Powered by: 5 TEPREL-C
- Maximum thrust: 950 kN (210,000 lb_{f})
- Burn time: 182 s
- Propellant: LOX / RP-1

Second stage
- Height: 12.1 m (40 ft)
- Powered by: 1 TEPREL-C vacuum
- Maximum thrust: 50 kN (11,000 lb_{f})
- Burn time: 420 s
- Propellant: LOX / RP-1

Kick stage (optional)

Miura 5 is a two-stage European orbital recoverable launch vehicle currently under development by the Spanish company PLD Space. In a standard two-stage configuration, it will have a length of 34 m, be capable of inserting 1000 kg of payload into a low Earth orbit (LEO), featuring an optional kick stage that can circularize the orbits of satellites.

Development of the Miura 5 has been sponsored by the European Space Agency (ESA) via the agency's Future Launchers Preparatory Programme (FLPP); additional support has come from the French space agency CNES and the Spanish agency National Institute for Aerospace Technology (INTA). Work commenced during the mid-2010s under the name Arion 2, the present name was adopted following a redesign that doubled the lift capacity of the launcher during 2018. On 11 April 2019, PLD Space carried out a successful drop and recovery test of the first stage of a Miura 5 demonstrator. As of May 2026, the first test flight of Miura 5 is expected to take place sometime in 2026.

== Design ==
The Miura 5 has been designed to reuse the majority of the technology developed for the preceding Miura 1. However, many of these technologies will be refined substantially to incorporate lessons learnt with the earlier rocket. New design elements include the propellant tanks and engine; it remains a liquid fuel rocket. Many elements of the Miura 5, including the propulsion system, structures, and avionics development, will be designed and produced in-house. Miura 5 is to be propelled by a single TEPREL-C turbopump engine, unlike its predecessor, which used a pressurized tank cycle instead.

A key feature of the Miura 5 is its reusable first stage. The recovery process shall employ a combination of engine thrust and parachutes. While furnished with a larger parachute arrangement to account for the larger scale of the Miura 5, the various subsystems controlling the recovery are identical those used on the Miura 1. The launcher's reuse capabilities have reportedly been scaled as to permit each rocket to be launched a maximum of three times.

The Miura 5 was originally envisioned to have a lift capacity of 150 kilograms; in comparison to Vega, Arianespace’s smallest launcher, it was to be capable of carrying roughly one-tenth of the payload. It is specifically intended for the launching of small satellites into low Earth orbit (LEO). However, mid-way through the design process, the Miura 5's lift capacity was doubled in response to formal recommendations produced by the ESA in 2018. It will be typically operated as a two stage launcher, although provisions will be made for individual rockets to be expandable to three stages when a greater lift capacity or altitude is required.

== Launch sites ==
During July 2019, it was announced that PLD Space had reached an agreement with the French space agency CNES to study the launch of Miura 5 at the Guiana Space Centre (CSG) in French Guiana. Under a separate arrangement, the Spanish agency National Institute for Aerospace Technology (INTA) has also worked with PLD Space in securing a launch site at the El Hierro Launch Centre, which has been claimed by the company to be the optimal choice from a technical perspective. PLD Space has also publicly commented on the possibility of conducting launches from the planned spaceport in Azores, but the status of this proposal is presently uncertain. Company officials have estimated that the construction of a suitable ground facilities for launching will cost roughly €15 million. During mid 2023, an agreement was signed with CNES for the future maiden launch of the Miura 5 to be conducted at Guiana.

== Development ==
=== LPSR Program ===
During October 2016, the European Space Agency (ESA) announced the selection of the Spanish aerospace start-up PLD Space as the main contractor of the LPSR ("Liquid Propulsion Stage Recovery") program, one part of the agency's Future Launchers Preparatory Programme (FLPP).

The company was allocated an initial contribution of €750,000 towards the early development of a reusable first stage of a future space launch system; the long-term objective is to provide the reusable first stage for what later became the Miura 5. Various options for recovery were examined, primarily involving the use of parachutes; other methods, such as the use of controlled paragliders or ballutes, were also explored at this stage. Some early testing of the system was performed using the smaller Miura 1 rocket.

Early on in its development, the launch vehicle was referred to as Arion 2. However, following the completion of a ten-month review conducted by the ESA and the decision to redesign the launcher to facilitate launches up to 300 kilograms to a 500-kilometer orbit, it was decided to adopt the name Miura 5.

=== Testing ===
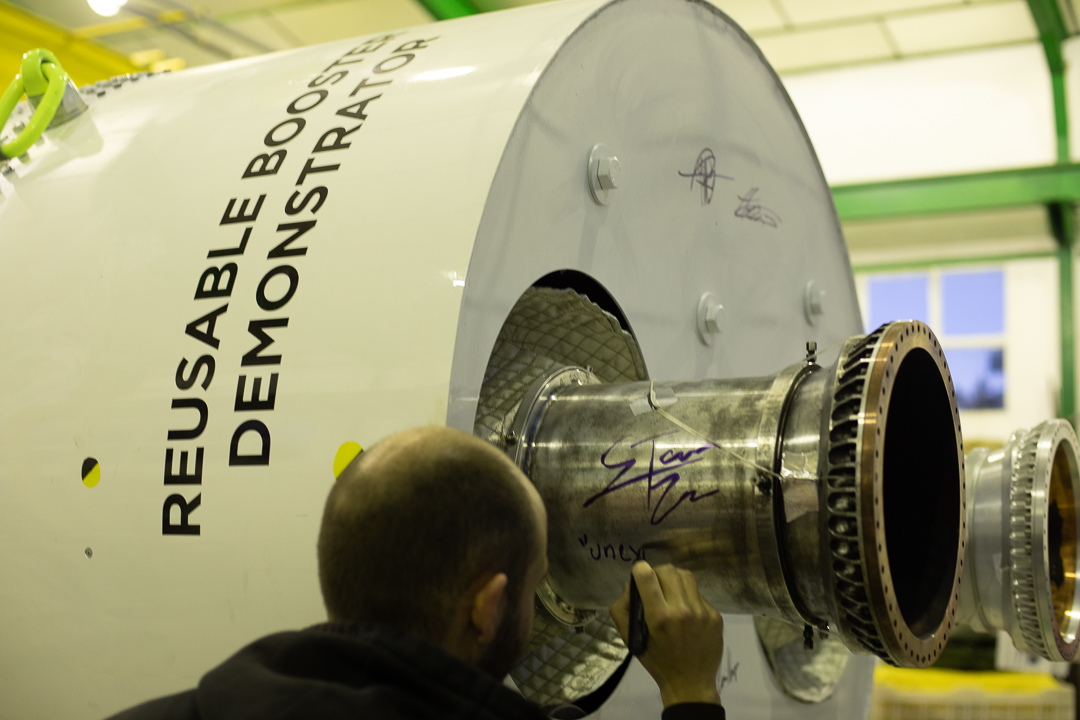
Downscale testing vehicle used during the 2019 drop test

On 11 April 2019, with the assistance of the Spanish Army, PLD Space performed a successful drop and recovery test of the first stage of a Miura 5 demonstrator at El Arenosillo Test Center. This demonstration stage, which had a reduced 1.5 m diameter instead of 1.8 m, was dropped by a Boeing CH-47 Chinook helicopter from a height of 5 km. It slowed its rate of descent using a total of three parachutes before performing a water landing, at which point it had been descending at a rate of roughly ten meters per second. The demonstrator was recovered by divers and brought back to Mazagón by a tugboat to be thoroughly examined. During 2021, in light of the successful drop testing of the first stage, ESA awarded a new contract to PLD Space to continue with development of the Miura 5.

=== First launch ===
As of December 2023, the first test flight of Miura 5 was expected to take place in early 2026. The initial model, which was planned to be used for the first two flights, would be entirely expendable. It was planned to be superseded by an improved model of Miura 5 with a recoverable first stage, which is intended to perform the planned commercial launches.

In April 2026, PLD Space secured a €30 million venture debt loan from the European Investment Bank to finish developing Miura 5. In May 2026, the company published first photos of flight hardware for Miura 5's first flight, which was expected to take place later in 2026.

== See also ==
- List of orbital launch systems – List of orbital rockets
- Maia – French orbital reusable rocket of the company MaiaSpace
- Zero 2 Infinity – Private Spanish company developing high-altitude balloons
- Capricornio (rocket) – Spanish orbital launch vehicle
- Themis programme – European Space Agency programme to develop a prototype reusable rocket first stage
