= Juntendo University =

Private university in Chiba Prefecture, Japan

- 順天堂大学
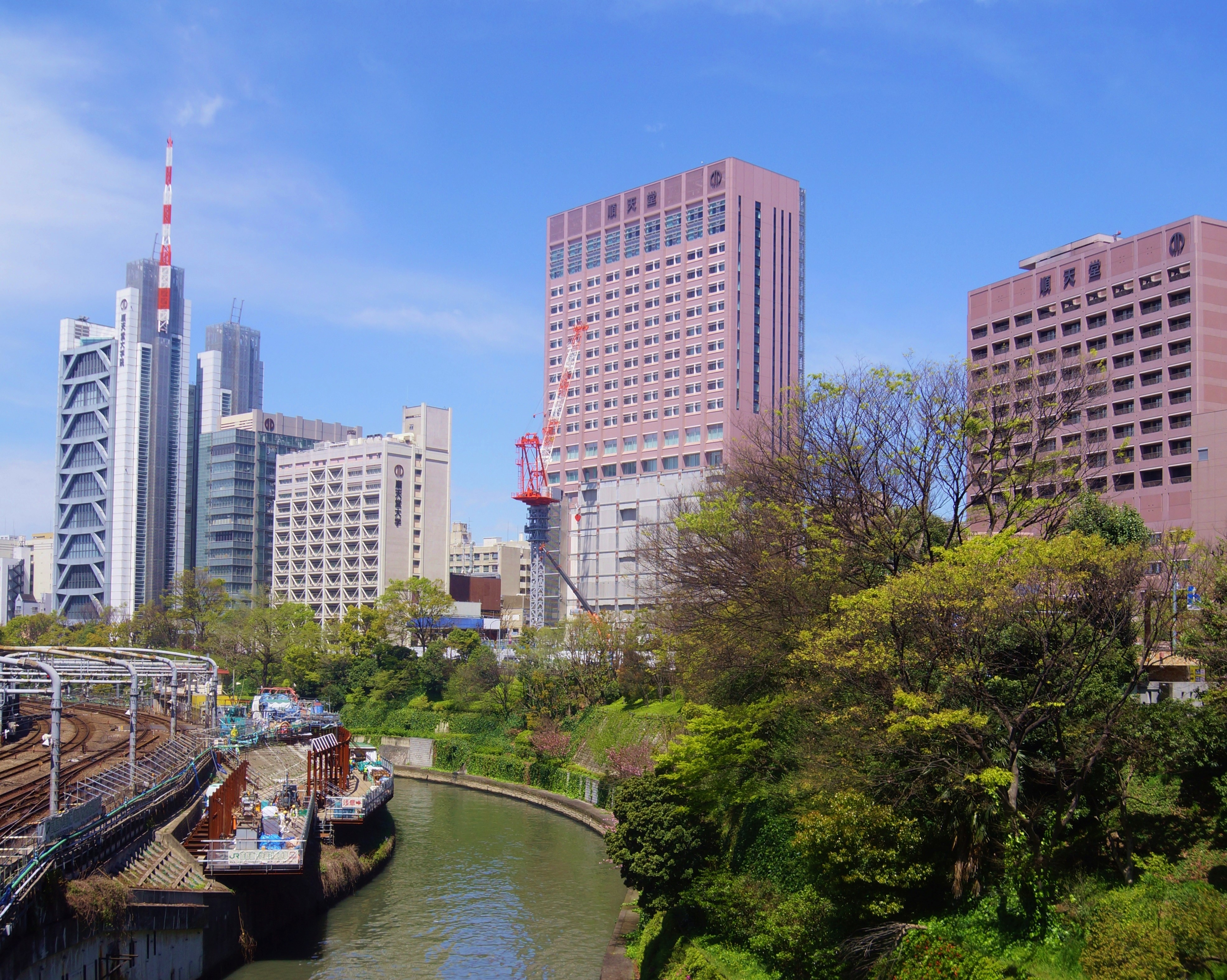
- Type: Private
- Established: 1946
- President: Eiki Kominami
- Location: Bunkyō, Tokyo, Japan
- Website: juntendo.ac.jp

Juntendo University (順天堂大学, Juntendō Daigaku) is a private university in Bunkyo, Tokyo, Japan. Its headquarters are on its campus in Bunkyo, for the School of Medicine and in Inzai, Chiba, for the School of Health and Sports Science. The university was established in 1946, although it can find its roots in a medical school founded in 1838. It is nicknamed Jundai.

== Campuses ==
- Hongō-Ochanomizu Campus: Bunkyo, Tokyo, 35°42′08″N 139°45′39″E
- Sakura Campus: Inzai, Chiba, 35°44′52″N 140°15′22″E
- Urayasu Campus:Urayasu, Chiba, 35°38′11″N 139°54′33″E
- Mishima Campus: Mishima, Shizuoka, 35°07′32″N 138°55′09″E

== Faculties ==
- Faculty of Medicine
- Faculty of Health and Sports Science
- Faculty of Health Care and Nursing
- Faculty of Health Sciences and Nursing
- Faculty of International Liberal Arts

The Juntendo University Graduate School of Medicine has granted doctorates since 1963, and the total numbers of the two types doctorate holders (甲 Kou and 乙 Otsu) has reached 1,897 and 2,394, respectively, as of 2017. The university has the longest history as a medical education institution in Japan. Juntendo started out in the Edo period (1603–1868) as an institution for medical treatment and education, especially in the field of surgery, continuing to the present day. The medical school has admitted to setting higher admissions standards for women "because they were better at communication than men and would have an advantage in the face-to-face interview component."

== Notable alumni ==
=== Athletes ===
- Tatsuya Hasegawa, football player
- Daiki Hashimoto, gymnast, Olympic gold medalist
- Reo Hatate, football player
- Masatada Ishii, football manager
- Takehiro Kashima, gymnast
- Naoto Kamifukumoto, football player
- Ryōhei Katō, gymnast
- Kazuma Kaya, gymnast
- Gota Miura, PhD, Olympic skier
- Hiroshi Nanami, football player
- Daichi Suzuki, swimmer, Olympic gold medalist
- Yusuke Suzuki, racewalker
- Shinji Takahira, sprinter, Olympic bronze medalist at the 4 × 100 metres relay
- Yusuke Tanaka, gymnast
- Hiroyuki Tomita, gymnast
- Kakeru Tanigawa, gymnast
- Wataru Tanigawa, gymnast
- Isao Yoneda, gymnast
