= Mur Sorkh =

Mur Sorkh مورسرخ
- Village
- Location within Iran
- Coordinates: 29°39′35″N 56°18′41″E
- Country: Iran
- Province: Kerman
- County: Sirjan
- Bakhsh: Central
- Rural District: Chahar Gonbad

Population (2006)
  - Total: 23
- Time zone: UTC+3:30 (IRST)
  - Summer (DST): UTC+4:30 (IRDT)

Mur Sorkh (Persian: مورسرخ, also Romanized as Mūr Sorkh, Mowr Sorkh, and Mūr-e Sorkh) is a village in Chahar Gonbad Rural District, in the Central District of Sirjan County, Kerman Province, Iran. At the 2006 census, its population was 23, in 5 families.
