= Yūichirō Miura =

Japanese skier and climber who summited Everest at age 70, 75, and 80 (born 1932)

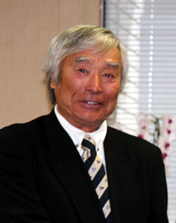
- Yūichirō Miura (November, 2007)

Personal information
- Native name: 三浦 雄一郎
- Nationality: Japanese
- Citizenship: Japan
- Born: October 12, 1932 (age 94) Aomori City, Aomori Prefecture, Tōhoku region, Empire of Japan
- Spouse: Tomoko Miura
- Children: Yuta (also Yudai) Miura (son); Emiri (also Emili) Miura (daughter); Gota Miura (son)
- Parent: Keizo Miura

Climbing career
- Major ascents: Mount Everest, 3X and oldest summiteer Seven Summits

Yūichirō Miura (Japanese: 三浦 雄一郎, Hepburn: Miura Yūichirō; born October 12, 1932) is a Japanese speed skier and alpinist. In 1970, he became the first person to ski on Mount Everest. Forty-three years later, in 2013, he became the oldest person to summit Everest, at the age of 80. He was born in Aomori Prefecture and graduated from Hokkaido University. He was introduced to alpine sports by his father when he was in second grade. Peaks he has skied down include all the Seven Summits. The government of Japan named an award after him and he was recognized by Guinness World Records. He has made many public appearances and has worked with several companies and organizations.

== Early life ==
Miura was born in Aomori City in the northernmost Tōhoku region of northeast Japan on October 12, 1932. His father, Keizo Miura, was a Japanese skier who worked as a forester. As a child, Miura was sickly and a poor student, dropping out of kindergarten and from the fourth to fifth grade of elementary school, He suffered from pleurisy due to tuberculosis and was hospitalized for long periods, meaning he missed nearly half of the year. Due to his father's work at the Forestry Bureau of the Ministry of Agriculture and Forestry (now the Ministry of Agriculture, Forestry and Fisheries), he had to change schools five times during his elementary education. Miura was exposed to snow sports from the time he was a child and competed in his first skiing competition during his second grade year of elementary school. He had to repeat his elementary school entrance exam four times and failed the entrance exam to Kurosawajiri Junior High School (now Iwate Prefectural Kurosawajiri Kita High School).

He won his first title at a ski competition held at Mount Iwaki while attending Aomori Junior High School. While attending Aomori Prefectural Hirosaki High School, he won a prize in downhill skiing at the All Japan Ski Championships and won the individual championship at the Aomori Prefectural High School Ski Championships three years in a row. Around the same time, he also placed second in the prefecture's ski jumping competition, despite it being his first time jumping on borrowed skis. He graduated from Aomori Prefectural Hirosaki High School.

He moved south with his family but found that he missed the snow and winter sports, prompting him to enroll at Hokkaido University. There, he studied veterinary medicine, graduating in 1956. After graduating, he worked for a year as a laboratory assistant and teacher at the university. While at Hokkaido University, he met his wife Tomoko who was a secretary to the university president and an alpine skier. At the All Japan Ski Championships he got into a fight with officials over the number of participants from Aomori and was banned from competing under amateur status permanently, so he became a professional skier at age 26. Just after losing his amateur status, he worked as a porter at Mount Tateyama in the Hida Mountains of the northern Japanese Alps.

== Alpine career ==
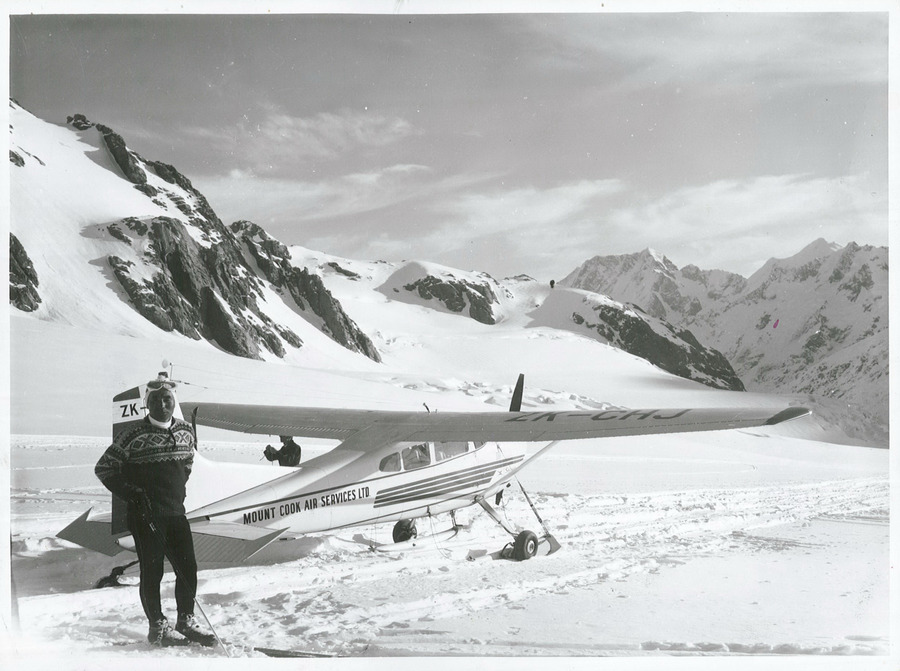
Miura at the Tasman Glacier in 1966.

Miura opened a ski school in the early 1960s. Miura competed in speed skiing and downhill skiing. His advanced ability to ski, especially in the backcountry, required him to reach high elevations by hiking enabling him to learn wintertime Alpine mountaineering. Once he became a prolific mountain climber, Miura began challenging larger mountains and skied down many of them.

Prior to his record-setting trip to Italy in 1964, Miura tried to develop low-drag skiwear using the wind tunnel laboratory of the Institute of Space and Astronautical Science of the Defense Agency (now the Ministry of Defense). While active in ski competitions, he competed in the 100-meter section of the steep slope downhill. He held the world's highest record for one day, which was established in Italy at Kilometer Lanchard in July 1964 with a speed of 172.084 kilometers per hour (106.928 mph). He was the first Japanese speed skier to compete in Italy. In 1966 he was invited to the Tasman Glacier in New Zealand, where he met Edmund Hillary. Also in 1966, he was the first person to ski Mount Fuji.

Miura became the first person to ski on Mount Everest on May 6, 1970, at age 37. Using a parachute to slow his descent, he skied down nearly 6,600 vertical feet from the South Col (elevation over 7,900 meters (25,900 ft)), before falling for some 1,300 feet (400 m), and stopping just 250 feet (76 m) from plunging into the bergschrund at the upper reaches of the Khumbu Glacier. The 1975 film The Man Who Skied Down Everest documented the accomplishment. The film won the Academy Award for Best Documentary Feature Film, the first athletics film to do so.

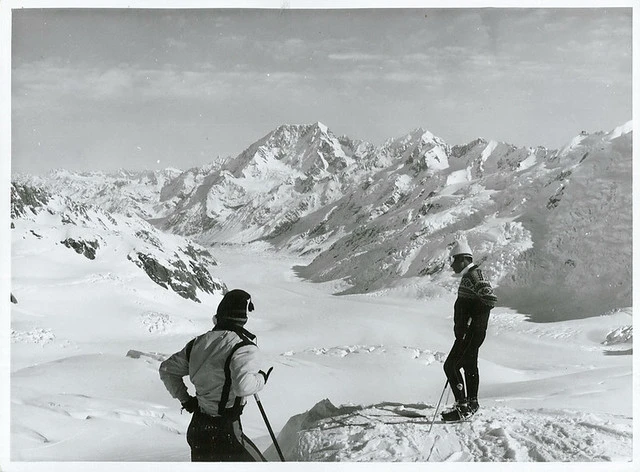
Two Japanese skiers (Miura on right) survey the ski-run down the Tasman Glacier from the glacier's head. Mt. Cook in August 1966

Other peaks Miura skied or climbed include Mount Kosciuszko - Australia's highest peak, Denali - North America's highest peak, Mount Kilimanjaro - the highest mountain in Africa, Vinson Massif - in Antarctica, Mount Elbrus - Europe's highest mountain, and Aconcagua - the highest peak in the Americas and the highest outside of Asia, completing descents of the Seven Summits.

On May 22, 2003, at the age of 70 and along with one of his sons, Gota Miura, Miura became the oldest person to reach the summit of Mount Everest, a record he twice broke, at age 75 on May 26, 2008, (Note: Summit dates are in local Nepali time) and for the last time at the age of 80 on May 23, 2013, again with Gota, despite having broken five bones in his pelvis at age 76 in a skiing accident in 2009, as well as four operations for arrhythmia since 2008. Gota is a freestyle skier and alpinist who competed at the Olympics in Lillehammer in 1994 and Nagano in 1998. Even though he was unable to complete the descent after reaching the top, and was airlifted from Advanced Base Camp at 6500 meters rather than descending to the Base Camp at 5,364 meters (17,598 ft), his achievement is listed in the Guinness Book of Records. Famous alpinists, however, like Ken Noguchi, dispute Miura's achievement, arguing that a climb can not be called "complete" unless one walks all the way down the mountain. Guinness World Records only requires that someone reach the summit under their own power and helicopter evacuation during descent for medical reasons is allowed. In 2019 he tried to conqueer Aconcagua again, but had to give up because of poor health.

Miura had several medical issues in the 2019–2020 timeframe: a lacunar cerebral infarct in April 2019, a cervical epidural hematoma in June 2020, and pacemaker surgery in July 2020. Despite his medical situation, in late August 2023, aged 90, Miura reached the summit of Mount Fuji with the aid of a specially designed wheelchair.

Miura was in competition with Nepalese climber Min Bahadur Sherchan. Sherchan, at age 81 in 2013, tried to break the eldest Everest climber record but gave up. He tried again at age 85 in 2017 but died at the Everest Base Camp. Sherchan had previously earned the title of eldest Everest climber at age 76, having earned it on May 25, 2008, the day before Miura summited Everest the second time, at age 75.

The oldest woman to summit Everest is also Japanese, Tamae Watanabe; first doing so at age 63 in 2002. Like Miura, she broke her own record, at age 73 in 2012.

=== Recognition ===
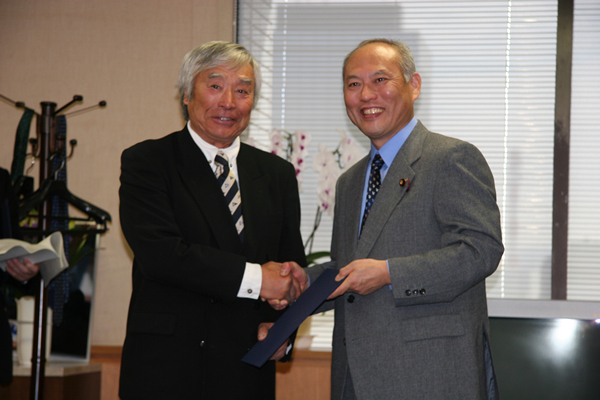
Miura with Yōichi Masuzoe (at the Central Government Building No.5 in November 2007)

After his third summit of Everest, the Japanese government named an award after him, the Miura Award. It is for those who "challenge themselves to the limits of human potential." Miura stated: "I think the award should be given to someone who is expanding the boundaries of the unknown . . . and space is the true frontier today," mentioning astronaut Koichi Wakata as being very deserving. Initially the government intended recipients only be the elderly, but that was changed when Miura insisted everyone be eligible. Miura also selects the recipients himself. However, no report of someone actually receiving the award has been announced.

In 2013, Miura received the 8th Japan Sports Grand Prix Award for outstanding achievement is skiing and mountaineering. In July 2018 he was in the first group of people to receive the Nepal Social Contributor Award; which honors Japanese people who have contributed to Nepal.

== Other activities ==
Miura has been involved in many activities outside of skiing and mountaineering. He makes more than 30 appearances monthly, according to his daughter Emiri. He became the principal of Clark Memorial International High School in Fukagawa, Hokkaido in 1992. Miura retired from the principal position on March 31, 2022, and became honorary principal on April 1, 2022. He also ran in two elections in 1995: the Hokkaido gubernatorial and the Upper House, to evaluate himself in the political sphere. He did not win either election. He sang in a promotional song for One Hokkaido Project in February 2019, an effort by television stations to promote the development and prosperity of Hokkaido. He is the representative director of the Miura Dolphins, a company that handles his work, media, and expeditions. Miura is also representative director of Miura Yuichiro Office Company, chairman of the National Forest Recreation Association, chairman of the NPO Global Sports Alliance, former member of the Ministry of Transport's Road Regulations Review Committee, and former member of the Prime Minister's Office Youth Affairs Council.

The Miura family has a strong connection to Utah. On February 15, 2004, Keizo Miura celebrated his 100th birthday with a ski descent together with more than 120 friends and family members, including four generations of his family, at Snowbird ski resort, Keizo's favorite ski resort, near Salt Lake City, Utah. (Note: Family members present in addition to Keizo (age 100) were: Keizo’s son Yūichirō (age 71), first grandson Yuta (age 38), second grandson Gota (age 34), Yuta’s wife Rie (age 31), great-granddaughter Rio (age 4, Yuta's daughter), and great-grandson Yuki (Age 1). It is uncertain if his first granddaughter Emiri (about age 36) was present.)

== See also ==
- List of Mount Everest records
- List of Mount Everest summiters by frequency
