= Mur (surname) =

Mur is a Spanish surname. Notable people with the surname include:

- Alejandro Soler Mur (1972), Spanish politician
- Dalmacio de Mur y de Cervelló (–1456), Spanish prelate of the fifteenth century
- Estefania Carròs i de Mur (1455–1511), Spanish educator
- Lautaro Mur (born 1997), Argentine professional footballer
- Mariano de Mur (1909–1936), Spanish footballer
- Mona Mur (born 1960), German singer
- Sergio Mur (born 1977), Spanish television actor

== See also ==
- Mur Lafferty (born 1973), American podcaster and writer
