= Muzan, Khuzestan =

Muzan موزان
- Village
- Location within Iran
- Coordinates: 31°44′23″N 48°29′14″E
- Country: Iran
- Province: Khuzestan
- County: Shush
- Bakhsh: Shavur
- Rural District: Seyyed Abbas

Population (2006)
  - Total: 580
- Time zone: UTC+3:30 (IRST)
  - Summer (DST): UTC+4:30 (IRDT)

Muzan (Persian: موزان, also Romanized as Mūzān) is a village in Seyyed Abbas Rural District, Shavur District, Shush County, Khuzestan Province, Iran. At the 2006 census, its population was 580, in 81 families.
