= Muran, Iran =

Muran موران
- Village
- Location within Iran
- Coordinates: 31°10′00″N 48°30′54″E
- Country: Iran
- Province: Khuzestan
- County: Karun
- Bakhsh: Soveyseh
- Rural District: Muran

Population (2006)
  - Total: 865
- Time zone: UTC+3:30 (IRST)
  - Summer (DST): UTC+4:30 (IRDT)

Muran (Persian: موران, also Romanized as Mūrān; also known as Mūzān) is a village in Muran Rural District, in the Soveyseh District of Karun County, Khuzestan Province, Iran. At the 2006 census, its population was 865, in 153 families.
