= Miura 1 =

Suborbital recoverable launch vehicle of the Spanish company PLD Space

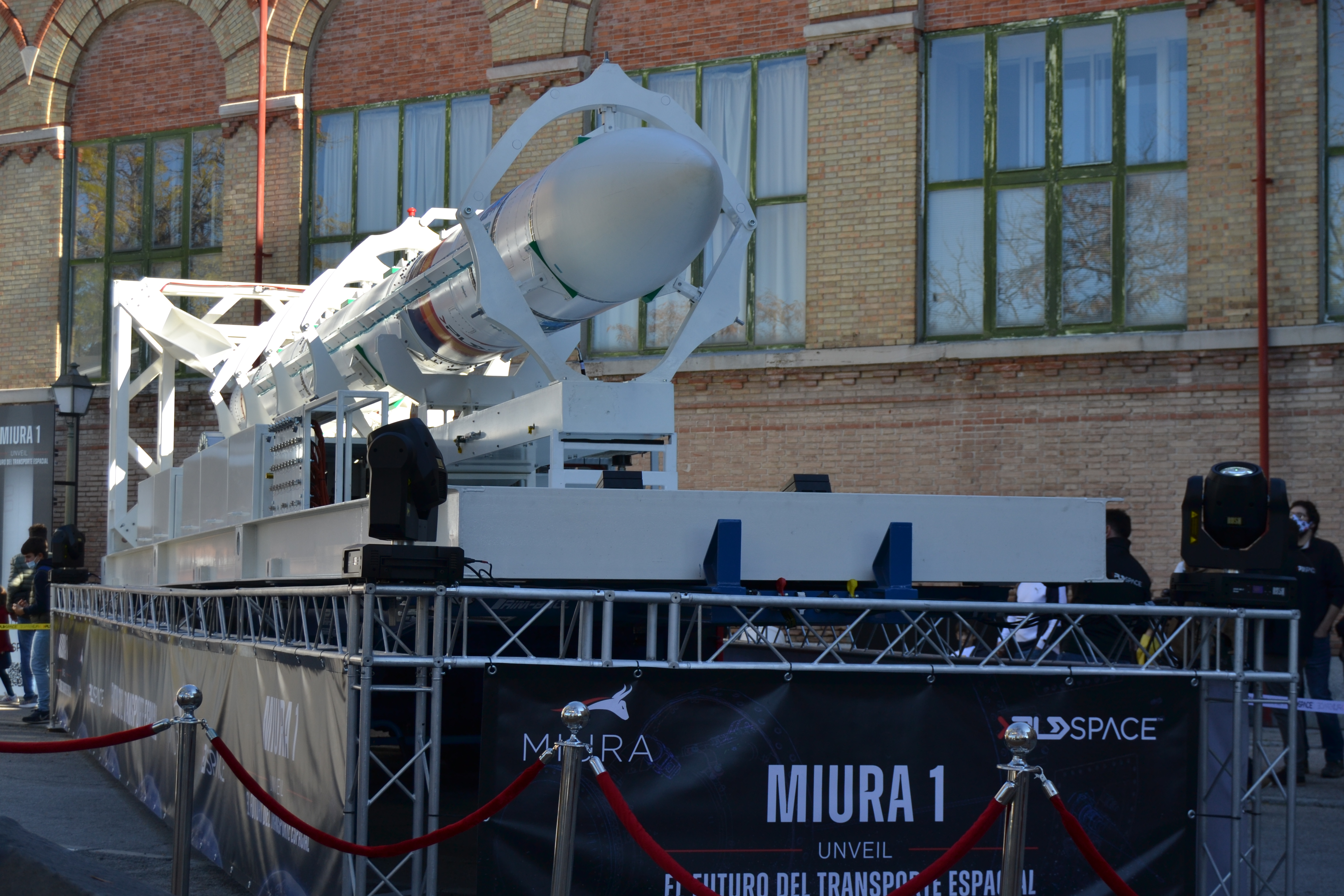
- Miura 1 exhibited in Madrid in November 2021
- Function: Sub-orbital reusable launch vehicle
- Manufacturer: PLD Space
- Country of origin: Spain

Size
- Height: 12.7 m (42 ft)
- Diameter: 0.7 m (2 ft 4 in)
- Mass: 2,550 kg (5,620 lb)
- Stages: 1

Capacity

Payload to suborbital (150 km)
- Mass: 100 kg (220 lb)

Launch history
- Status: Active
- Launch sites: El Arenosillo
- Total launches: 1
- Success(es): 1
- Failure: 0
- Partial failure: 0
- First flight: October 7, 2023

First stage
- Powered by: 1 TEPREL-B
- Maximum thrust: 30.2 kN (6,800 lb_{f})
- Burn time: 122 seconds
- Propellant: liquid oxygen (1,000 L) / kerosene (600 L)

Miura 1 (previously called Arion 1) is a suborbital recoverable launch vehicle developed by the Spanish company PLD Space. It is the first launch vehicle in Europe that is designed to be recoverable. It was first launched successfully on October 7, 2023, at 00:19 UTC.

== Design ==
Miura 1 was originally proposed as a two-stage rocket capable of achieving suborbital flight. It was originally planned to be 12 m long, with a capacity of 250 kg (551 lb). The engines were to use liquid oxygen and kerosene as propellants.

In its final design, Miura 1 is a 12.7 m long 0.7 m diameter one-stage rocket, propelled by one TEPREL-B engine. The vehicle can fly a payload of up to 200 kg on a suborbital trajectory. The propulsion system is equipped with actuators to tilt the engine for an active thrust vector control. Additionally, Miura 1 is equipped with a recovery system using its engines and parachutes that enable PLD Space to recover the vehicle from the ocean and re-use the complete launch vehicle. With this, it will be the first recoverable launch vehicle in Europe. Miura 1 is intended to be used for scientific research or technology development in a microgravity environment and/or in the upper atmosphere. Furthermore, about 70% of the technology developed for Miura 1 is planned to be used on the Miura 5 orbital rocket.

== Development progress ==
In December 2019 GMV announced that the Miura 1 avionics system had passed the qualification phase.

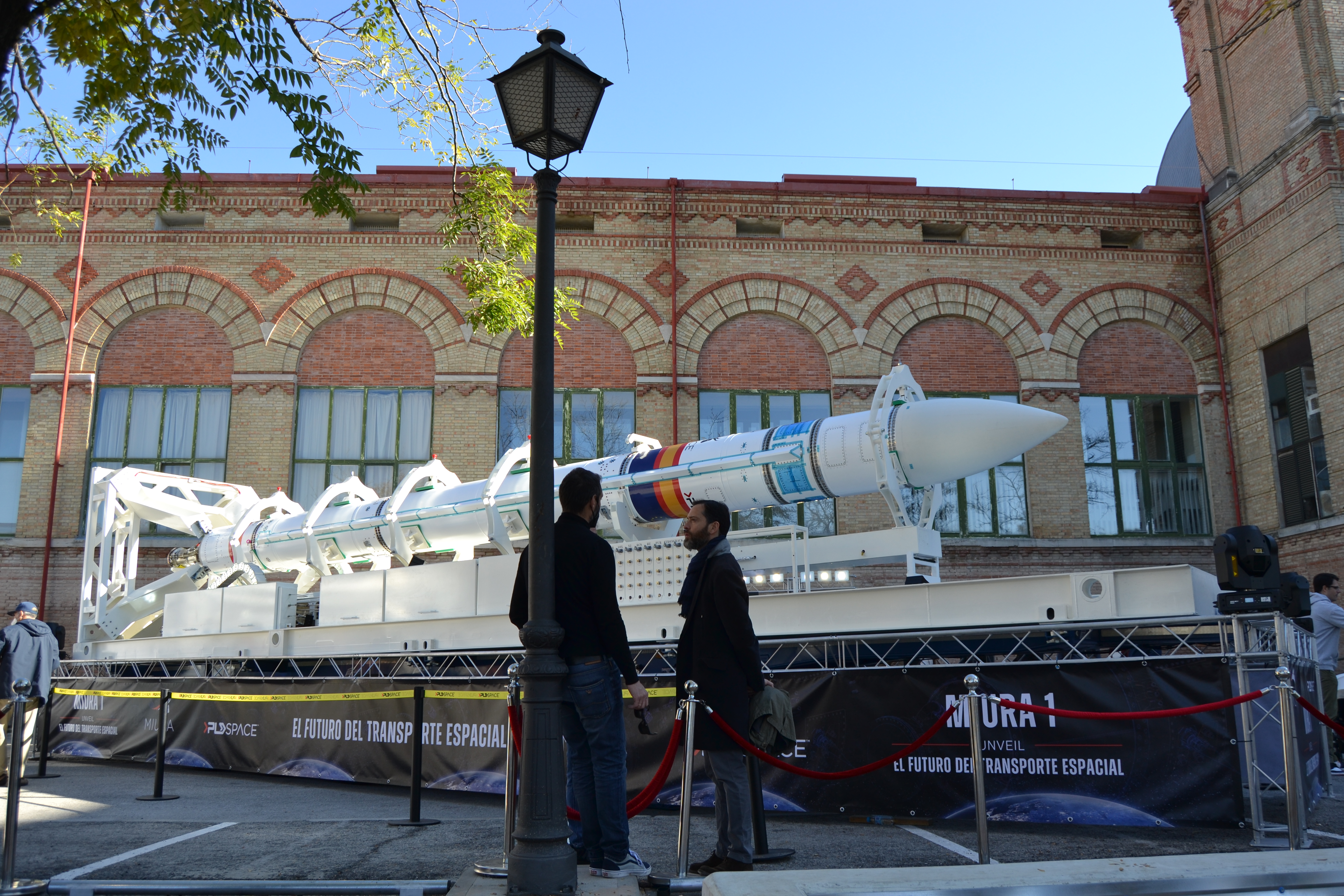
Miura 1 exhibited in Madrid in November 2021

In March 2020, the stress test of the Miura 1 pressurized tanks was carried out to check their ability to withstand the working pressure (more than 400 bars (5,800 psi)) with a successful result. COPVs (Composite Overwrapped Pressure Vessel) are used to pressurize propellant tanks and are a fundamental element of many launchers.

In July 2020 the German Center of Applied Space Technology and Microgravity (ZARM) successfully completed vibration tests of its payload that will fly on the first launch (Test Flight-1) of Miura 1.

On April 7, 2022, the company carried out the first test of the complete launcher at its facilities in Teruel, being the first test in Europe of a rocket propelled by liquid fuel and aimed to reach space and developed by a private company. (Note: Other liquid propellant engines were not designed to reach space (> 100 km altitude), or were developed by government institutions, for example the V2 rocket or Ariane rocket family.)

After the first launch, the company said that they developed Miura 1 for just under 30 million euros.

== First launch ==
The first test flight of Miura 1 was initially planned for 2021 from an experimental rocket launch site in Almonte (Huelva), southwestern Spain, administered by El Arenosillo, and it will carry a payload from the German Center of Applied Space Technology and Microgravity (ZARM). Up to eight suborbital launches are targeted per year. It had been delayed to 2022.

On May 31, 2023, Miura 1, a launch window opened at 00:00 UTC, but was cancelled due to upper-level winds. On June 17, the company tried again, but the ignition of the engines was cancelled due to the on-board systems detecting abnormal parameters in the vehicle. Following that, and taking into account the increased risk of fires around the launch area due to high temperatures, the company decided in coordination with the Civil Guard to postpone a new launch attempt until fall.

The launch occurred on October 7, 2023, at 00:19 UTC. The rocket reached an apogee of 46 km. PLD Space considers this first launch to have been a success despite the apogee being only 46 km instead of 80 km (the decision was made before the launch to target a low altitude, flatter trajectory instead of a high altitude trajectory because of range safety reasons). The rocket was unable to be recovered after it splashed down in the planned location in the Atlantic. After most probably developing a water leak into the fuel tank because of the rocket hitting the sea, the rocket sank.

== See also ==
- Miura 5 – European orbital recoverable rocket of the company PLD Space
- PLD Space – Private Spanish launch services provider
- List of orbital launch systems – List of orbital rockets
- Zero 2 Infinity – Private Spanish company developing high-altitude balloons
- INTA-300 – Suborbital two-stage launch vehicle of the Spanish INTA
- Capricornio (rocket) – Spanish orbital launch vehicle
