= PLD Space =

Private Spanish launch services provider

Payload Aerospace S.L. PLD Space

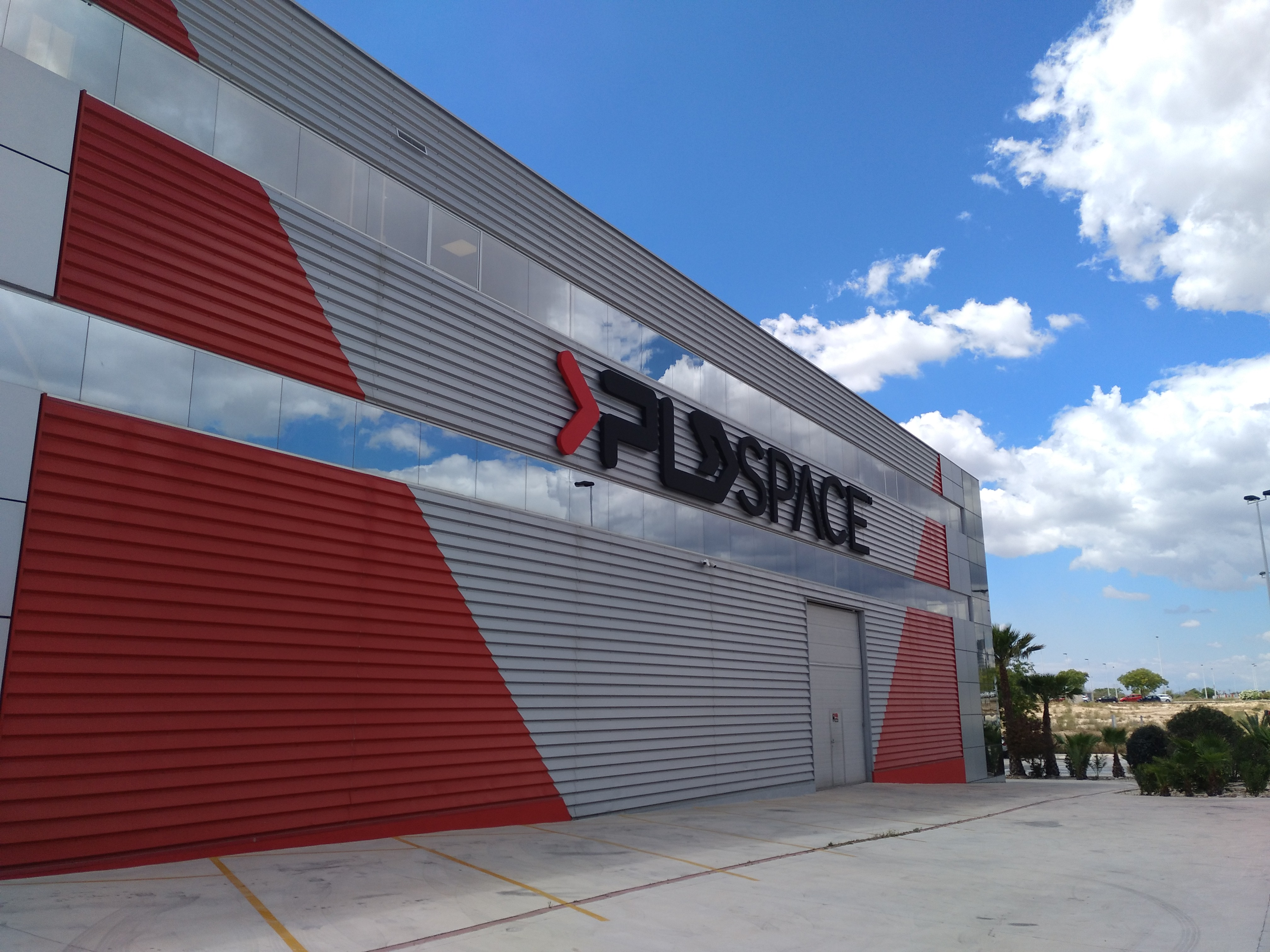
- Headquarters of PLD Space in Elche, Spain
- Type: Private
- Industry: Launch service provider
- Founded: 2011; 15 years ago
- Founder: Raúl Torres, Raúl Verdú and José Enrique Martínez
- Fate: Active
- Headquarters: Elche, Spain
- Key people: Raúl Torres (co-founder & CEO); Raúl Verdú (co-founder & COO)
- Products: TEPREL rocket engine; Miura 1 rocket; Miura 5 rocket
- Services: Suborbital & orbital rocket launch; Rocket engine testing
- Number of employees: 400+ (October 2025)
- Website: pldspace.com/en/

Payload Aerospace S.L. (PLD Space) is a Spanish company developing two partially-reusable launch vehicles called Miura 1 and Miura 5. Miura 1 is designed as a sounding rocket for sub-orbital flights to perform research or technology development in microgravity environment and/or in the upper atmosphere. Furthermore, Miura 1 is also serving as the technological demonstrator of the orbital launcher Miura 5. Miura 5 will provide orbital launch capabilities for small payloads such as CubeSats, that need a flexible and dedicated launch vehicle and therefore cannot fly with traditional launch vehicles. It is being designed to deliver a total payload mass up to 900 kg (2,000 lb) into low Earth orbit.

== History ==
PLD Space was founded in 2011 by Raúl Torres, Raúl Verdú and José E. Martínez in Elche, Spain, and as of 2019 it employed 70 people. In August 2017 the company headquarter moved to new facilities in the Elche Industrial Park, where the assembly facilities for Miura 1 are located.

Since 2014, the company has operated an engine test stand located at Teruel Airport, where they performed the first test of its liquid fuel engine on 1 July 2015. It was the first time a liquid rocket engine was tested in Spain, and the first time a private company in Europe tested a liquid rocket engine on its own facilities. As of 2018, PLD Space had plans to expand their test facilities to include a vertical test stand to qualify the complete Miura 1 suborbital rocket.

In early August 2018, PLD Space and the Teruel Airport Consortium signed the concession of a 13337 m^{2} space at the airport for the PLD Space to test launcher technology. The agreement has a period of 25 years, with the option of an additional 10-year extension. PLD Space will invest €1 million in infrastructure for the construction of a new control room, offices, access paths, a rocket engine maintenance hangar and a new test bench to test the complete Miura 1 rocket.

In November 2018, PLD Reached an agreement with INTA (transl. Esteban Terradas National Institute for Aerospace Technology) to launch Miura 1 from El Arenosillo. The agreement is not limited to using the INTA facilities for launching but rather establishing a lasting relationship that will allow them to develop scientific, aerospace and technical knowledge.

In July 2019, PLD Space reached an agreement with CNES to study the launch of Miura 5 from CSG, French Guiana. As part of their agreement, INTA is also helping them procure a launch site, being El Hierro Launch Centre the best option from a technical point of view.

As of March 2023, the company planned to launch their first Miura 1 vehicle in the second quarter of 2023 from El Arenosillo Test Centre. The launch successfully occurred on 7 October 2023 at 0:19 UTC.

In August 2026, the European Space Agency awarded PLD Space a €158.9 million contract under the European Launcher Challenge for the provision of launch services using its Miura 5 launch vehicle.

=== Funding ===
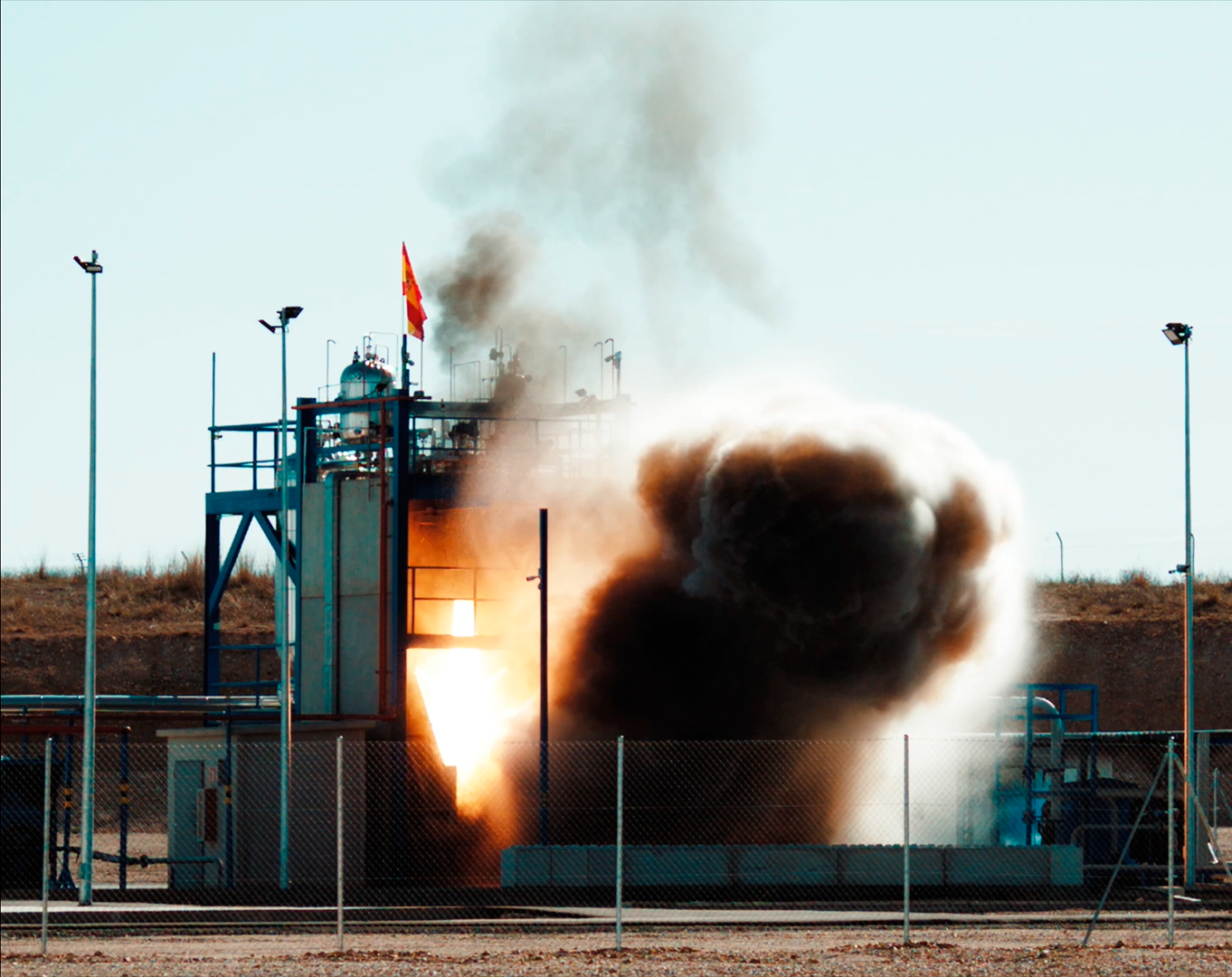
Rocket engine testing

The company has been funded through a series of investment rounds from both institutional and private sources, raising a total of €120M by 1 June 2024.

By 2013, the company, had gathered investments worth approximately US$10M. In 2013 they closed a US$1.6M investment round, including a seed contract with the Spanish Government through the Centre for the Development of Industrial Technology (CDTI).

In December 2015, PLD Space secured its first commercial contract as one of the partners in the Small Innovative Launcher for Europe (SMILE) program with the European Commission and the German Aerospace Center (DLR). The company contracted to test liquid propulsion engines for the DLR at its propulsion test facilities in the airport of Teruel. In April 2016, PLD Space secured a further US$1.56M from Spain's TEPREL reusable launcher engine program. TEPREL (acronym for Spanish Reusable Propulsion Technologies for Launchers) will help PLD Space to continue their liquid rocket engine program, the first one in Spain dedicated to boost the small satellite industry in Europe. This project will help PLD Space to develop a 35 kN rocket engine qualified for flight.

In October 2016, The European Space Agency (ESA) selected PLD Space as the prime contractor for the "Liquid Propulsion Stage Recovery" project (LPSR) as part of the agency's Future Launchers Preparatory Programme (FLPP). The goal of this project is to study a strategy to recover the first stage of a launcher, making it partially reusable, with a prospected funding of US$800,000. In a second investment round, closed in January 2017, the company secured US$7.1M, US$3.2M of that contributed by GMV. GMV also took the role to develop the complete avionics of Miura 1 and Miura 5, including guidance, navigation and control (GNC), telemetry and onboard software for both launchers. PLD Space received further €2M in January 2018 through the European Commission's Medium-sized Enterprises (SME) Instrument Phase 2, as part of the European Union's Horizon 2020 program for research and innovation, a grant to support to the development of a pair of launchers designed for small satellites. In February 2018 PLD Space was one of the five companies chosen by ESA to perform a feasibility study proposing an economically viable, commercially self-sustaining microlauncher. For this, the company received a funding of US$368,000. In September 2020, PLD Space secured €7M Series B funding from Arcano partners.

In September 2026, PLD Space extended its Series C funding round by €108 million, bringing the round's total to €288 million and the company's aggregate funding to €488 million. The financing will support the company's industrial scale-up and the development and commercialization of its MIURA 5 orbital launcher.

== Vehicles ==
=== Miura 1 ===
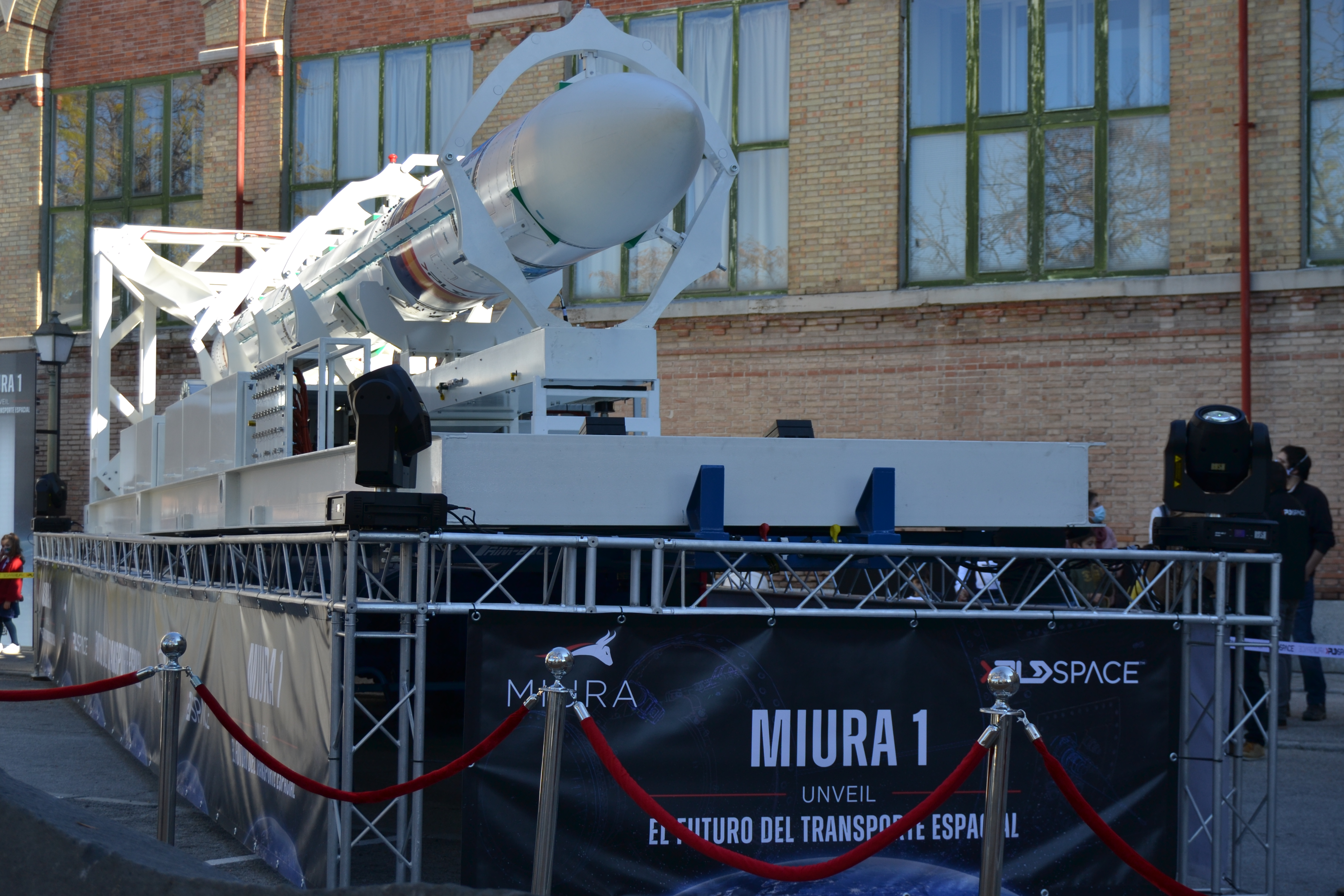
Miura 1 exhibited in Madrid in November 2021

Miura 1 is a single stage sub-orbital launch vehicle, the first designed in Europe that is intended to be recoverable from the outset. It uses a TEPREL-B engine, also designed and produced by PLD Space.

=== Miura 5 ===
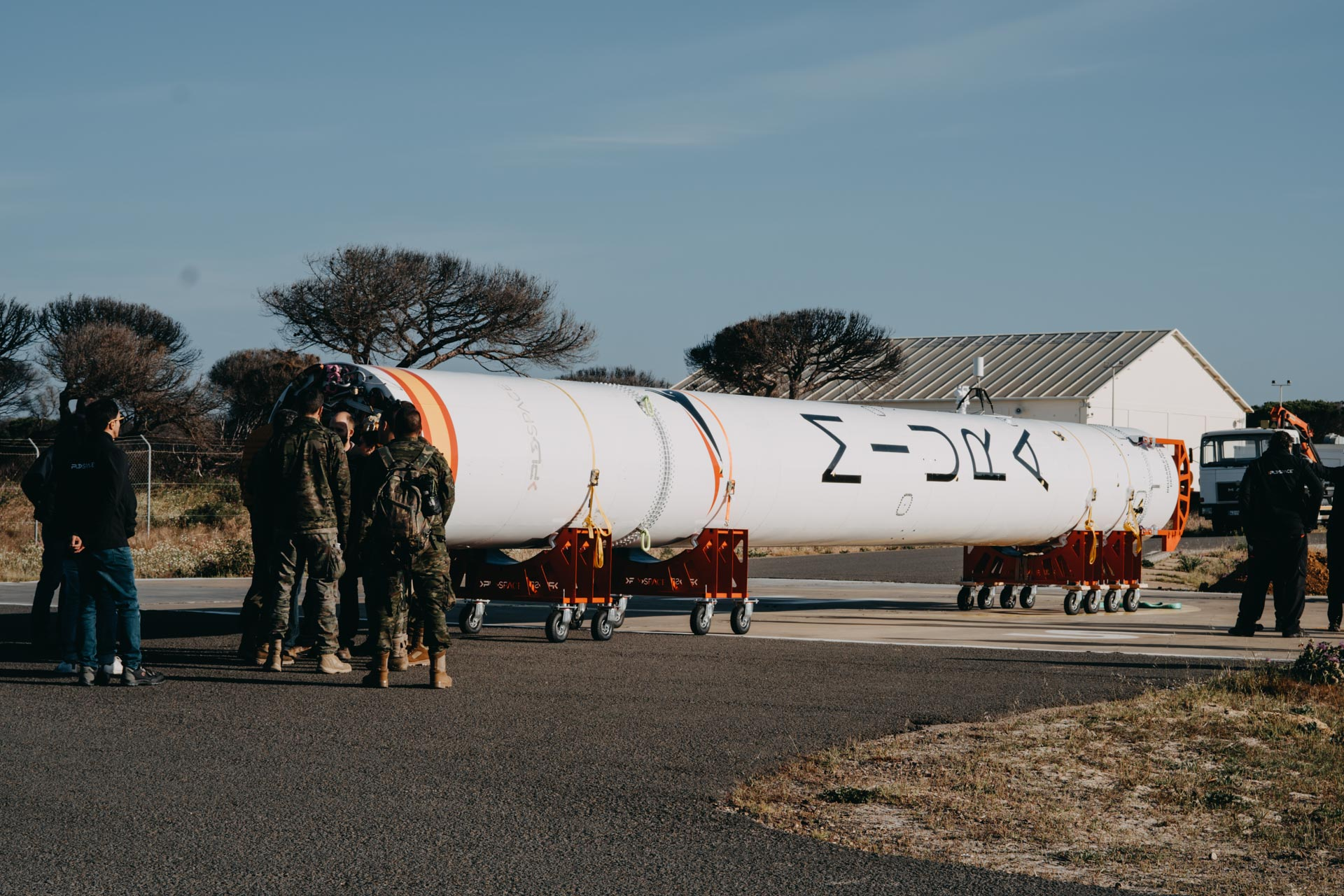
Miura 5 reuse testing in 2019

Miura 5 is a 35.7 m long two-stage launch vehicle capable of placing up to 1,080 kg of load in low Earth orbit. It uses 5 TEPREL-C engines.

=== Miura Next ===
Miura Next is a family of partially reusable launch vehicles that is under development. The base version of Miura Next will consist of a single core first stage booster and an upper stage. The Heavy is a 3 core version of the same architecture, while the Super Heavy is a 5 core version. Each booster will use 5 closed cycle oxidizer-rich engines that will use RP-1 and LOX as propellants and produce more than 1100 kN of thrust. The structures of Miura Next will be produced from an aluminium composite material. The 1 core version is planned to be operational by 2030 - while the Heavy version is planned to be operational 1-2 years later.

=== Lince ===
Lince (Lynx in English) is the name of the project to develop a cargo and crewed capsule. It will have a mass of 5 tons, a diameter of 3.2 meters, and 8 cubic meters of volume. It will be able to carry up to four or five astronauts, or 3.4 tons of cargo to low Earth orbit.

== Facilities ==
PLD Space has its headquarters and main factory in Elche, Spain. In addition to this main office, it has other facilities:

=== PLD Space Propulsion Test Facilities ===
In August 2018, Spanish launch service provider PLD Space signed a concession with the Teruel Airport Consortium for 13,337 m^{2} of space at the airport to test launch vehicle technology. The agreement covered 25 years, with an optional 10-year extension. PLD Space was to invest €1M in infrastructure for the construction of a new control room, offices, access paths, a rocket engine maintenance hangar and a new test bench to test its Miura 1 rocket. Over the previous three years, testing had been conducted at the airport on a short-term contract basis.

=== El Arenosillo Test Centre ===
PLD Space has reached an agreement with the Instituto Nacional de Técnica Aeroespacial for the use of the facilities of the El Arenosillo Test Centre (CEDEA) for the launch of the Miura 1 vehicle and tests of the Miura 5.

=== Guiana Space Centre ===
The company has a concession of 15,765 square meters of space in the launch complex ELM, in the Guiana Space Centre, where a launch area and a preparation area are currently under construction. This includes an integration hangar, a clean room, a control center, and commercial and working offices.
