= Big dumb booster =

Concept in cost efficiency of rocket design

Big Dumb Booster (BDB) is a general class of launch vehicle based on the premise that it is cheaper to operate large rockets of simple design than it is to operate smaller, more complex ones regardless of the lower payload efficiency. As referred to by the Office of Technology Assessment:

The term Big Dumb Booster has been applied to a wide variety of concepts for low-cost launch vehicles, especially those that would use "low technology" approaches to engines and propellant tanks in the booster stage. As used here, it refers to the criterion of designing launch systems for minimum cost by using simplified subsystems where appropriate.

Even though the large minimum-cost design (MCD) booster is less efficient for all around operation, its total cost of operation is cheaper because it is easier to build, operate and maintain, with the benefit of high reliability because of reduced parts counts.

== History ==
Concept work was led by proponents at Aerospace Corporation, TRW, and Aerojet General, beginning in the late 1950s. The typical approach included maraging steel (HY-140) for structure, pressure-fed engines using N_{2}O_{4} / UDMH, later LOX / RP-1, with pintle injectors scaled up from TRW's Lunar Module Descent Engine (LMDE).

The Sea Dragon was an extremely large conceptual BDB/MCD 2-stage launch vehicle defined by Robert Truax and others at Aerojet. Space Technology Laboratories, Inc. (TRW) contributed to the design effort. It would have been to be able to carry a payload of over 500 metric tons into low Earth orbit.

TRW (now Northrop Grumman) developed and fired several engines, including their TR-106, a robust, low-cost engine of 2890 kN (650 klb) thrust to demonstrate the engine technology readiness. TRW also defined a low-cost shuttle-surrogate booster to launch 29 metric tons into a 28-degree orbit at a cost of about $59 million.

Beal Aerospace furthered the quintessential BDB/MCD with their BA-1 and BA-2 launch vehicles.

== Minimum cost design ==
The MCD methodology was developed by Arthur Schnitt. It is a process of making trade analyses to understand the cost versus mass implications. It is not a specific design choice like pressure-fed engines or single engine per stage. The process shows how to reduce costs by allowing mass to increase where there is a favorable impact on life-cycle cost. Some of the early design concepts were referred to as big dumb boosters, not necessarily in a favorable manner.

The cost of a launch vehicle relative to the payload mass (e.g. dollars per kilogram to orbit) can be determined from the rocket equation, along with mass ratios and cost ratios. As low-tech rocket hardware gets heavier (such as the mass of tanks relative to propellants and the mass of engines relative to thrust), the cost of that hardware (dollars per kg of material) must become vastly cheaper, which explains why a big dumb booster would likely be impractical.

== See also ==
- Beal Aerospace – American launch vehicle company
- Big dumb object – Plot device in science fiction
- OTRAG (rocket) – West German rocket company
- Pressure-fed engine (rocket) – Rocket engine operation method
- Sea Dragon (rocket) – 1962 concept for a reusable, sea-launched rocket
