= 3D-printed spacecraft =

Type of spacecraft

3D printing began to be used in production versions of spaceflight hardware in early 2014, when SpaceX first flew a flight-critical propulsion system assembly on an operational Falcon 9 flight. A number of other 3D-printed spacecraft assemblies have been ground-tested, including high-temperature, high-pressure rocket engine combustion chambers and the entire mechanical spaceframe and integral propellant tanks for a small satellite.

A 3D printed rocket engine successfully launched a rocket to space in 2017, and to orbit in 2018. An almost 90% 3d-printed rocket was launched to space on 23 March 2023 but failed to achieve orbit. On May 30, 2024, The startup Angnikul cosmos,(a private startup) in India makes a breakthrough by 3d printing a cryogenic rocket engine from scratch.

== History ==
3D printing began to be used in production versions of spaceflight hardware in early 2014. In January of that year, SpaceX first flew a "Falcon 9 rocket with a 3D-printed Main Oxidizer Valve (MOV) body in one of the nine Merlin 1D engines". The valve is used to control flow of cryogenic liquid oxygen to the engine in a high-pressure, low-temperature, high-vibration physical environment.

In 2015–2016, other 3D-printed spacecraft assemblies were ground-tested, including high-temperature, high-pressure rocket engine combustion chambers and the entire mechanical spaceframe and propellant tanks for a small satellite of a few hundred kilograms.

In June 2014, Aerojet Rocketdyne (AJR) announced that they had "manufactured and successfully tested an engine which had been entirely 3D printed." The Baby Banton engine is a 22 kN (5,000 lbf) thrust engine that runs on LOX/kerosene propellant. By March 2015, AJR had completed a series of hot-fire tests for additively manufactured components for its full-size AR-1 booster engine.

The new United Launch Alliance Vulcan launch vehicle—with first launch no earlier than 2019—is evaluating 3D printing for over 150 parts: 100 polymer and more than 50 metal parts.

By 2017, a 3D printed rocket engine had successfully launched a rocket to space, when on 25 May 2017 an Electron rocket launched to space from New Zealand that was the first to be powered by a main stage rocket "engine made almost entirely using 3D printing." The Electron's first successful orbital launch was on 21 January 2018.

The Terran 1 methane-oxygen rocket manufactured by Relativity Space is about 90% 3D-printed by weight. The company launched the rocket for its first test flight on 23 March 2023 though it ended in a failure. Following a successful liftoff, it failed to reach orbit after an anomaly in the upper stage engine following separation.

== Applications ==
=== Rocket engines ===
The SuperDraco engine that provides launch escape system and propulsive-landing thrust for the Dragon V2 passenger-carrying space capsule is fully printed, and was the first fully printed rocket engine. In particular, the engine combustion chamber is printed of Inconel, an alloy of nickel and chromium, using a process of direct metal laser sintering, and operates at a chamber pressure 6,900 kilopascals (1,000 psi) at a very high temperature. The engines are contained in a printed protective nacelle to prevent fault propagation in the event of an engine failure. The SuperDraco engine produces 73 kilonewtons (16,400 lbf) of thrust. The engine completed a full qualification test in May 2014, and is slated to make its first orbital spaceflight in 2018 or 2019.

The use of 3D printing supported the engine's low-mass design by enabling production of complex components, including cooling channels, the injector head, and the throttling mechanism. According to Elon Musk, the ability to manufacture these components using high-strength allows was important to the development of the SuperDraco engine.

The rocket engine for the Electron launch vehicle is made nearly entirely using 3D printing.

=== Spacecraft structure ===
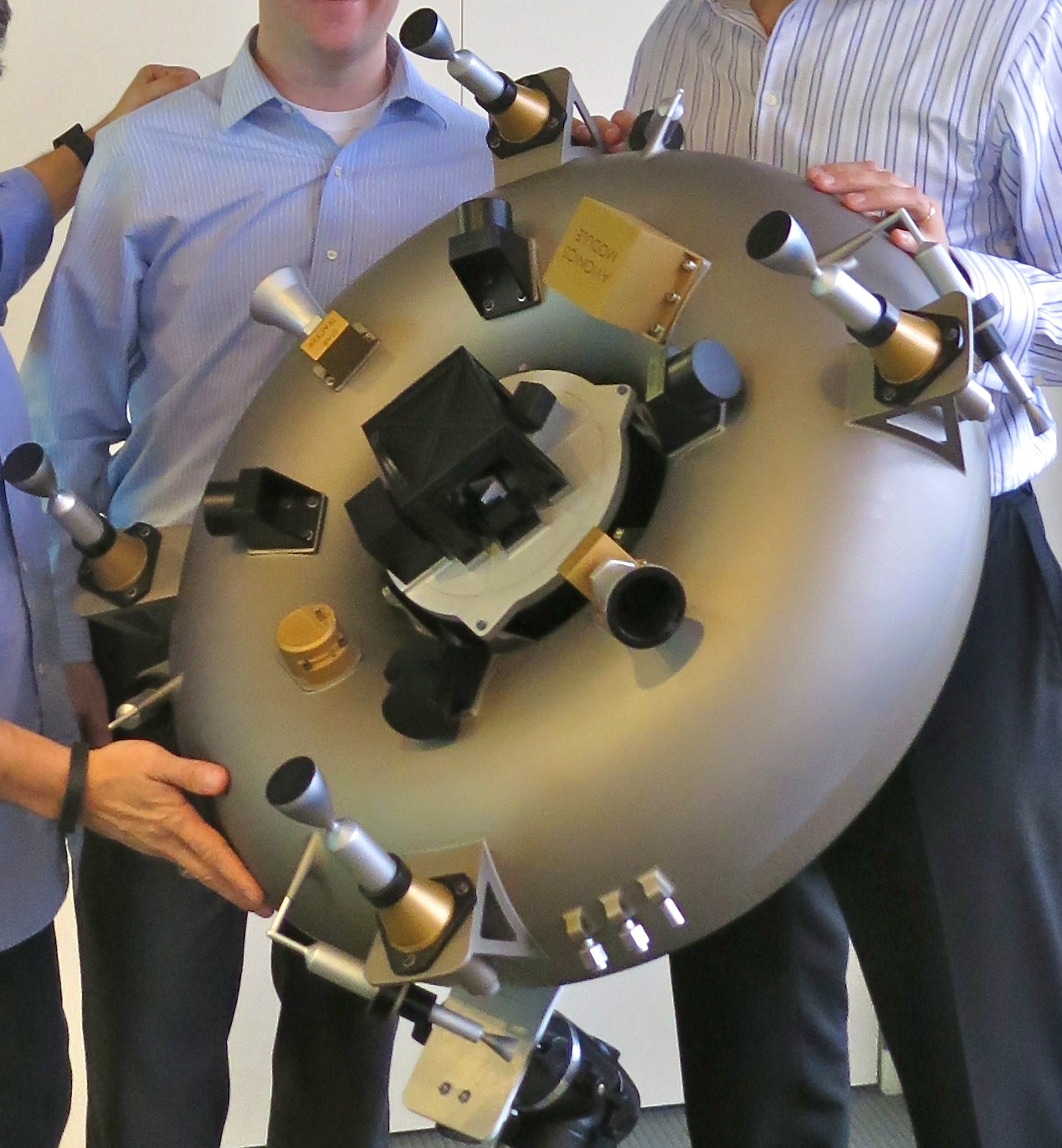
3D-printed satellite mechanical structure, Arkyd-300, February 2014. The torus holds the propellant and provides the structural frame for the satellite.

By 2014, 3D printing had begun to be used to print the entire mechanical structure and integral propellant tanks of a small spacecraft.
