= Aerojet Rocketdyne =

American aerospace propulsion manufacturer

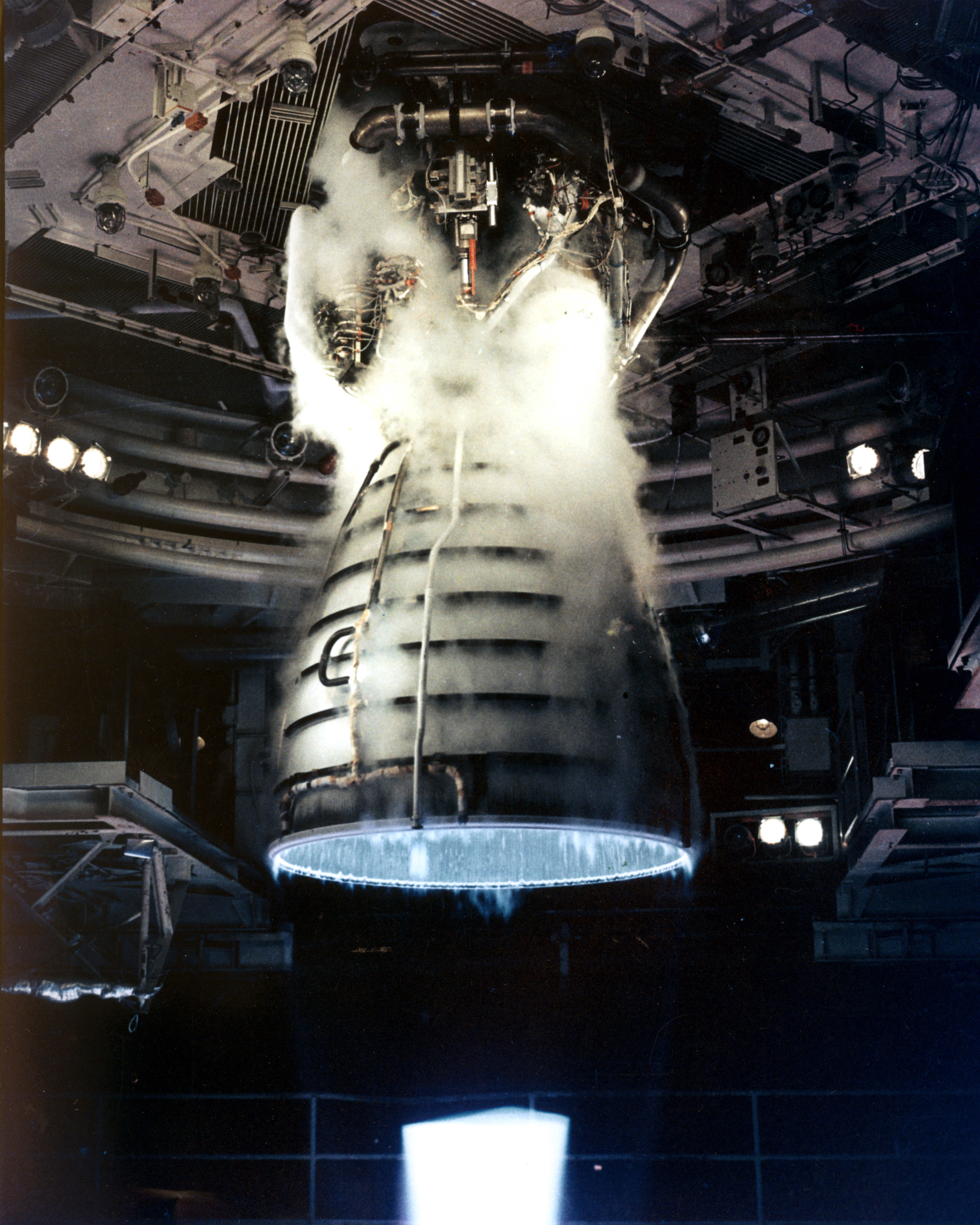
- Formerly: The General Tire and Rubber Company (1915–1984); GenCorp, Inc. (1984–2015); Aerojet Rocketdyne Holdings, Inc. (2015–2023)
- Traded as: NYSE: GY (until 2015); NYSE: AJRD (2015–2023)
- Industry: Aerospace, Defense
- Predecessors: Aerojet; Pratt & Whitney Rocketdyne
- Founded: 1915; 111 years ago
- Defunct: January 5, 2026
- Fate: Split into Rocketdyne and L3Harris Missile Solutions
- Headquarters: Palm Bay, Florida, U.S.
- Key people: Kenneth L. Bedingfield (president)
- Revenue: ▲US$2.24 billion (2022)
- Operating income: ▼US$145 million (2022)
- Net income: ▼US$74 million (2022)
- Total assets: ▼US$2.37 billion (2022)
- Total equity: ▲US$541 million (2022)
- Number of employees: 5,283 (2022)
- Parent: L3Harris

Aerojet Rocketdyne was a company, and later a subsidiary of American defense company L3Harris, that manufactured rocket, hypersonic, and electric propulsive systems for space, defense, civil and commercial applications. Aerojet traced its origins to the General Tire and Rubber Company (later renamed GenCorp, Inc. as it diversified) established in 1915, while Rocketdyne was created as a division of North American Aviation in 1955. Aerojet Rocketdyne was formed in 2013 when Aerojet and Pratt & Whitney Rocketdyne were merged, following the latter's acquisition by GenCorp, Inc. from Pratt & Whitney. Aerojet Rocketdyne was acquired by L3Harris in July 2023 for $4.7 billion. In 2026, L3Harris agreed to sell the "Space Propulsion and Power Systems" sector of Aerojet Rocketdyne to AE Industrial Partners, who will spin off the business under the name "Rocketdyne", and to hold an IPO for the remaining "Missile Systems" sector.

== History ==
=== Background: Aerojet ===
Several decades after it began manufacturing rubber products, General Tire & Rubber diversified into broadcasting and aeronautics.

In the 1940s, the Aerojet company began experimenting with various rocket designs. For a solid-fuel rocket, they needed binders, and turned to General Tire & Rubber for assistance. General became a partner in the company.

Radio broadcasting began with the purchase of several radio networks starting in 1943. In 1952, its purchase of WOR-TV expanded the broadcast business into television. In 1953, General Tire & Rubber bought the RKO Radio Pictures movie studio. All of its media and entertainment holdings were organized into the RKO General division.

Due to the studio and rocket businesses, General Tire & Rubber came to own a great deal of property in California. Its internal facilities management unit began commercializing its operations, landing General Tire & Rubber in the real estate business. This started when Aerojet-General Corporation acquired approximately 12,600 acres (51 km^{2}) of land in Eastern Sacramento County. Aerojet converted these former gold fields into one of the premier rocket manufacturing and testing facilities in the Western world. However, most of this land was used to provide safe buffer zones for Aerojet's testing and manufacturing operations. Later, as the need for these facilities and safety zones decreased, the property became available for other uses. Located 15 miles (24 km) northeast of Sacramento along U.S. Highway 50, the properties were valuable, being in a key growth corridor in the region. Approximately 6,000 acres (24 km^{2}) of the Aerojet lands are now being planned as a community called Easton. Easton Development Company LLC was formed to assist in the process.

=== Background: Rocketdyne ===
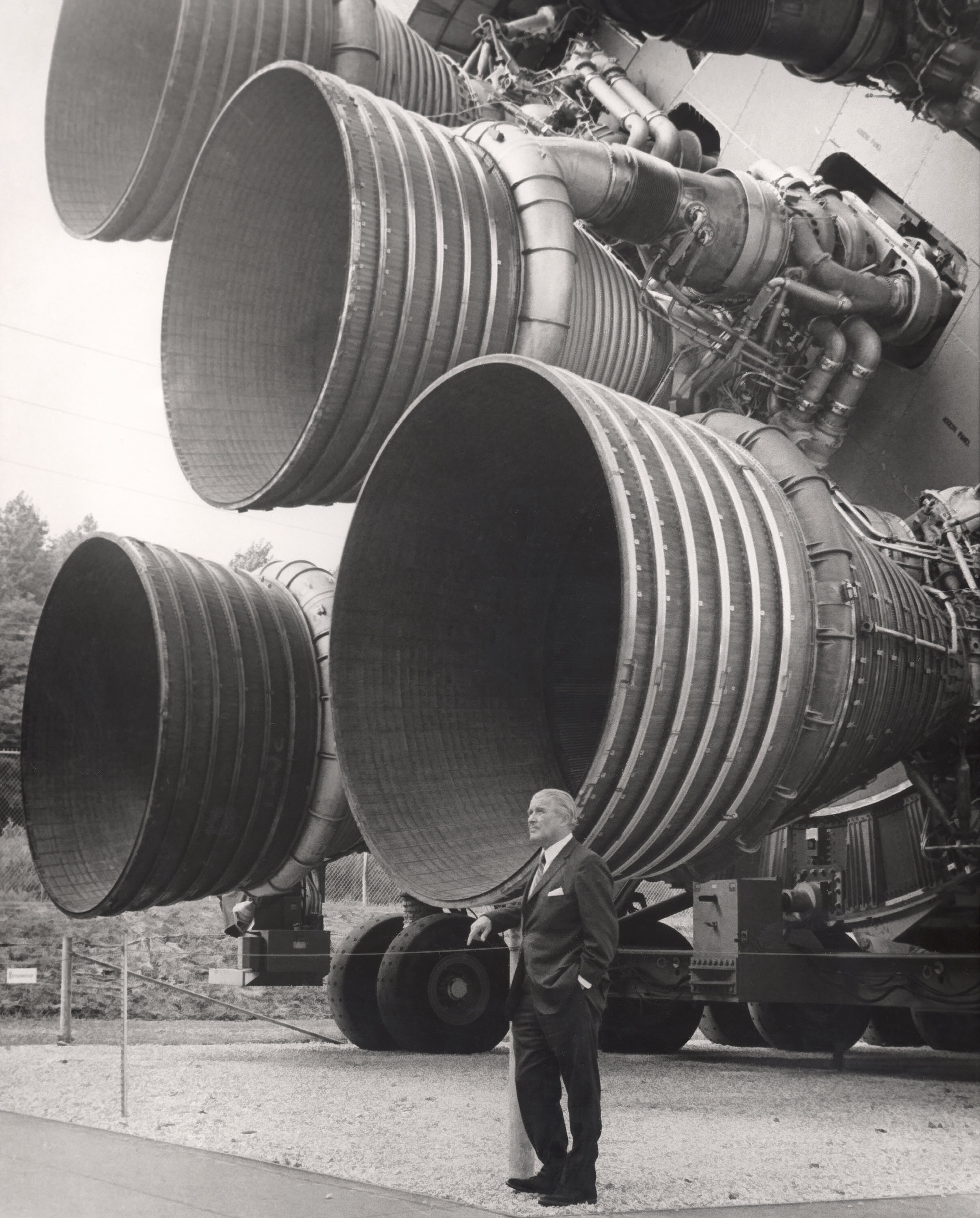
Rocketdyne F-1 engines on the Saturn V first stage.

In 1955, North American Aviation spun off Rocketdyne, a developer of rocket motors that built upon research conducted into the German V-2 Rocket after World War II. Rocketdyne would become a major supplier for NASA, producing the Rocketdyne F-1 engine for the Saturn V rocket of the Apollo Space Program as well as the RS-25 engine of the Space Shuttle program and its successor the Space Launch System (SLS) program.

Aerojet Rocketdyne engines have contributed to every successful NASA Mars mission, including powering the launch, entry, descent, and landing phases of the Perseverance rover mission.

=== Name change ===
GenCorp, Inc. wordmark until 2015.

In 1984, General Tire created a parent holding company, GenCorp, Inc., for its various business ventures.

The main subsidiaries were:

- General Tire and Rubber
- RKO General, the broadcast arm of the conglomerate;
- DiversiTech General, a manufacturer of tennis balls and polymer products, including automotive soundproofing and home wallpapers.
- Aerojet General, a defense (missile) contractor.

Through its RKO General subsidiary, the company also held stakes in:

- Frontier Airlines.
- RKO bottlers, which operated Pepsi-Cola distributorships; and several resorts and hotels, including the Westward Look resort in Tucson, Arizona.

=== Disconglomeration ===
Faced with a hostile takeover attempt, among other difficulties, GenCorp, Inc. shed some of its long-held units in the late 1980s.

RKO General ran into difficulties with the Federal Communications Commission (FCC) during license renewal proceedings in the late 1980s. The FCC was reluctant to renew the broadcast licenses, due to widespread lying to advertisers and regulators. As a result of the protracted proceedings, GenCorp sold RKO General's broadcast properties beginning in 1987.

GenCorp, Inc. also sold its former flagship, General Tire, to German tire manufacturer Continental AG in order to concentrate on Aerojet.

In 1999, GenCorp, Inc. spun off its Decorative & Building Products and Performance Chemicals businesses. GenCorp, Inc. formed OMNOVA Solutions Inc. into a separate, publicly traded company, and transferred those businesses into it.

GenCorp, Inc.'s two remaining businesses, as of 2008, were Aerojet and Easton Real Estate.

=== Pension problems and leadership changes ===
GenCorp, Inc. withdrew its over-funded pension during the real estate boom years of 2006 and 2007. The real estate bust caused an underfunding of the pension plan of over $300 million. This caused a freeze of its pension plan on February 1, 2009, and an end to 401(k) match on January 15, 2009. The move was expected to save the company $29 million a year.

In March 2008, hedge fund Steel Partners II, which owned 14% of GenCorp, Inc., made an agreement that saw Terry J. Hall step down as CEO and gave Steel Partners II control of three board seats plus the selection of the new CEO (who would also hold a board seat). Steel Partners II had previously attempted a hostile takeover in 2004, and forced the deal after complaining about "significant underperformance and deterioration of share price". Aerojet President J. Scott Neish was named interim CEO.

In January 2010, Scott Seymour, the former head of Northrop Grumman Integrated Systems from 2002 to 2008, was appointed permanent CEO of GenCorp, Inc. and Neish resigned.

=== Aeronautics expansion ===
Aerojet Rocketdyne logo until 2023, which also used by its holding company.

In July 2012, GenCorp, Inc. agreed to buy rocket engine producer Pratt & Whitney Rocketdyne from United Technologies Corporation for $550 million. The FTC approved the deal on June 10, 2013, and it closed on June 17. GenCorp, Inc. was later renamed Aerojet Rocketdyne Holdings, Inc on April 27, 2015.

=== Abandoned acquisition by Lockheed Martin ===
On December 20, 2020, it was announced that Lockheed Martin would acquire the company for $4.4 billion. The acquisition was expected to close in first quarter of 2022, but this received opposition from Raytheon Technologies. Later the FTC sued to block this deal on a 4–0 vote in January 2022 on grounds that this would eliminate the largest independent maker of rocket motors and Lockheed subsequently abandoned the deal in February 2022.

=== Acquisition by L3Harris ===
In December 2022, L3Harris Technologies agreed to buy the company for $4.7 billion in cash. The acquisition was completed in July 2023. L3Harris named former CTO Ross Niebergall as president of the new Aerojet Rocketdyne business segment, which would now be headquartered in Palm Bay, Florida.

=== Spin off from L3Harris ===
In January 2026, L3Harris agreed to sell a majority stake in the Aerojet Rocketdyne "Space Propulsion and Power Systems" sector to AE Industrial Partners, who will spin off the business under the name "Rocketdyne" in the second half of the year. The deal includes the RL10 upper stage engine used on the Vulcan rocket, but not the RS-25 engine used by the Space Launch System. Later that month, it was announced that the remaining Missile Solutions business was also planned to undergo an IPO as a new company, with L3Harris retaining controlling ownership and the US Government investing $1 billion, in the second half of 2026.

== Products ==
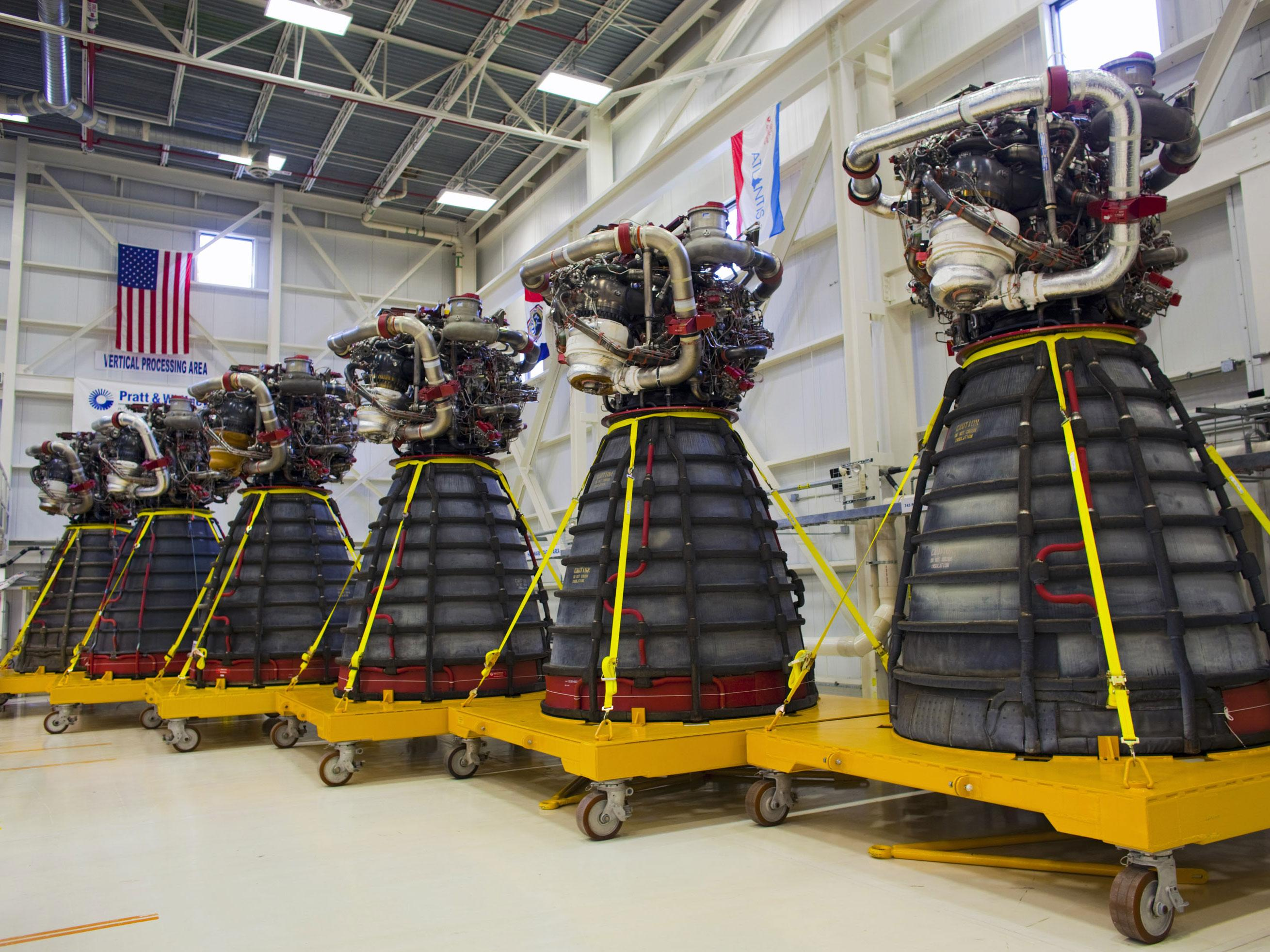
RS-25 engines

=== Current thrusters ===
- RS-25 (LH_{2}/LOX) – Previously known as the Space Shuttle main engine (SSME), it was the reusable main engine developed by Rocketdyne for the now-retired Space Shuttle. Remaining RS-25D engines are planned for use on early Space Launch System rocket launches after which an expendable version, RS-25E will be developed for follow-on SLS launches.
- RL10 (LH_{2}/LOX) – Developed by Pratt & Whitney and currently used on the Centaur upper stage for the Atlas V. It is also currently used on the Space Launch System on the Interim Cryogenic Propulsion Stage (ICPS) and will be used on the Exploration Upper Stage (EUS) in the future. Formerly used on the upper stage for the Delta IV, the Centaur upper stage for Titan, the S-IV upper stage for the Saturn I, the vertical-landing McDonnell Douglas DC-X "Delta Clipper". It was intended to serve as the main propulsion engine for the proposed Altair lunar lander. Two RL10 engines are used on Centaur V upper stage of ULA Vulcan.
- R-4D (MMH/NTO) – 100 lbf (exact thrust depends on variant) hypergolic thruster, originally developed by Marquardt as RCS thrusters for the Apollo SM and LM. Currently used as secondary engines on the Orion European Service Module, and as apogee motors on various satellite buses.
- MR103G — 0.2 lb hydrazine monopropellant thruster
- MR111g — 1 lb hydrazine monopropellant thruster
- MR106L — 5-7 lb hydrazine monopropellant thruster
- MR107M — 45 lb hydrazine monopropellant thruster
- Blue Origin CCE (solid rocket motor or SRM) — the Blue Origin New Shepard Crew Capsule Escape Solid Rocket Motor is built by Aerojet Rocketdyne.

=== Former production engines and others ===
- Rocketdyne F-1 (RP-1/LOX) – The main engine of the first stage of the Saturn V rocket used in the Apollo program. The most powerful single combustion chamber liquid-propellant rocket engine ever developed.
- Rocketdyne J-2 (LH_{2}/LOX) – Used on the upper stage of the Saturn IB and second and upper stages of Saturn V.
- SJ61 (JP-7/ingested air) – A dual-mode ramjet/scramjet engine flown on the Boeing X-51 hypersonic demonstration vehicle.
- AJ10 (Aerozine 50/N_{2}O_{4}) – Second stage engine for the Delta II, used as the Orbital Maneuvering System (OMS) engine for the Space Shuttle, and the main engine for the European Orion Service Module.
- AR1 (RP-1/LOX) – A proposed 500,000-pound-force-class (2,200 kN) thrust RP-1/LOX oxidizer-rich staged combustion cycle engine.
- Rocketdyne H-1 (RP-1/LOX) – A first stage engine flown on the Saturn I and Saturn IB launch vehicles.
- RS-27 (RP-1/LOX) – A first stage engine flown on the Delta 2000 launch vehicle.
- RS-27A (RP-1/LOX) – A first stage engine flown on the Delta II and Delta III.
- RS-68 (LH_{2}/LOX) – A first stage engine flown on the Delta IV, designed as a simplified version of the RS-25 due to its expendable usage. It is the largest hydrogen-fueled rocket engine ever flown.
- J-2X (LH_{2}/LOX) – An engine that was originally being developed for the Ares I's upper stage before the cancellation of the Constellation program. The engine was considered for the Space Launch System's Exploration Upper Stage before being replaced with a cluster of four RL10s. It is based on the Rocketdyne J-2.
- Baby Bantam (RP-1/LOX) – An 22 kN (5,000 lbf) thrust engine. In June 2014, Aerojet Rocketdyne announced that they had "manufactured and successfully tested an engine which had been entirely 3D printed".
- AJ-26 (RP-1/LOX) – Rebranded and modified NK-33 engines imported from Russia. Used as first stage engine for the Antares before being replaced by the RD-181.
- AJ-60A (Solid – HTPB) – A solid rocket motor formerly used for the Atlas V launch vehicle, until being replaced by the Northrop Grumman GEM-63 in 2021.
- AR-22 (LH_{2}/LOX) – An engine in development from 2017 to 2020 for the XS-1 spacecraft, also known as the Phantom Express. The engine is based on the RS-25 and utilizing parts remaining in Aerojet Rocketdyne and NASA inventories from earlier versions of the RS-25. Two of the engines would have been built for the spaceplane. Boeing pulled out of the project in January 2020, effectively ending it.

=== In development ===
==== X3 ion thruster ====
On 13 October 2017, it was reported that Aerojet Rocketdyne completed a keystone demonstration on a new X3 ion thruster, which is a central part of the XR-100 system for the NextSTEP program. The X3 ion thruster was designed by the University of Michigan and is being developed in partnership with the University of Michigan, NASA, and the Air Force. The X3 is a Hall-effect thruster operating at over 100 kW of power. During the demonstration, it broke records for the maximum power output, thrust and operating current achieved by a Hall thruster to date. It operated at a range of power from 5 kW to 102 kW, with electric current of up to 260 amperes. It generated 5.4 newtons of thrust, "which is the highest level of thrust achieved by any plasma thruster to date". A novelty in its design is that it incorporates three plasma channels, each a few centimeters deep, nested around one another in concentric rings. The system is 227 kg (500 lb) and almost 1 metre (3 ft 3 in) in diameter.

=== Other notable products ===
==== Multi-mission Radioisotope Thermoelectric Generator ====
Aerojet Rocketdyne is the prime contractor to the US Department of Energy for the Multi-mission Radioisotope Thermoelectric Generator. The first flight MMRTG is currently powering the Mars Curiosity Rover, and a second flight unit powers the Perseverance Rover.
