= Aerojet 260 =

Experimental solid rocket motor

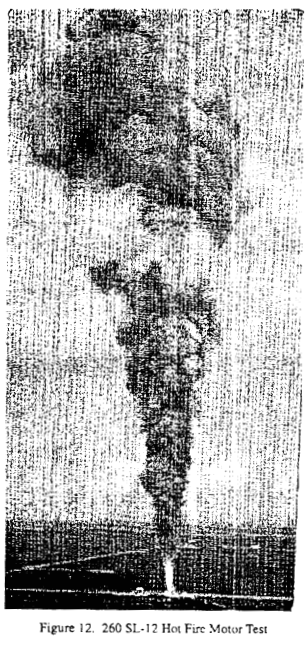
- Aerojet 260 motor test, 25 September 1965
- Country of origin: United States
- Manufacturer: Aerojet
- Associated LV: Saturn V
- Status: Cancelled

Solid-fuel motor
- Propellant: PBAN
- Core: Wagon wheel

Configuration
- Nozzle ratio: 6:1

Performance
- Thrust: 17,695 kN (3,978,062 lbf)
- Chamber pressure: 4,100 kPa (600 psi)
- Specific impulse: 263 s (2.58 km/s)
- Specific impulse, sea-level: 238 s (2.33 km/s)
- Burn time: 114 seconds

Dimensions
- Length: 24.6 m (80.7 ft)
- Diameter: 6.6 m (260 in)
- Empty mass: 85,300 kg (188,100 lb)
- Gross mass: 831,345 kg (1,832,801 lb)

The Aerojet 260 was an experimental solid rocket motor constructed and tested in the mid-1960s by Aerojet for NASA.

== History ==
In the 1960s, the 260 was initially designed to test the feasibility of solid rocket motors for space exploration, including use on the lower stage of the Saturn V. Development of the motors was originally given as parallel contracts to Aerojet and Thiokol. Aerojet won out in the end when Thiokol's test chamber burst at 56% of proving pressure during a stress test. The burst was due to signals from a new Acoustical Non-Destructive Test system being ignored, as conventional strain gauges showed no problem. On the flip side, the Aerojet chambers survived testing due to changes in heat treatment of the material and welding practices.

The test director was Will Spratling, and the program manager for the motor development was Dick Cottrell, Vice President of the Aerojet Solid Rocket Plant. Due to the large undertaking of the 260-inch motor development, many Aerojet staff had to move to a new Florida facility headed by Paul Datner. The size and complexity of the motors necessitated massive facilities for motor and propellant production, static testing, and supporting activities. The Florida facility construction combined these facilities into a single integrated facility. The diameter of the rocket motors made transport by rail impossible, as casings were restricted to a 156-inch diameter. To solve this problem Aerojet constructed a new canal leading to their facility in Florida which allowed for delivery of the boosters by barge.

Two tests of the boosters (SL-1 and SL-2) were carried out on 25 September 1965 and 23 February 1966, respectively, and were reportedly visible up to 80 miles away. The results from the test firings of test motors SL-1 and SL-2 showed a maximum thrust value of 3.5 million pounds (15.7 meganewtons) and a burn time of 114 seconds. The firings used six tons of PBAN propellant a second, producing a column of white-hot fire visible in Miami 31 miles away. The SL-3 motor was also test-fired on 17 June 1967 using improvements based on the two previous firings. It resulted in the largest single motor ever fired on Earth at 5.6 million pounds (26.2 meganewtons) of thrust. Since SL-3 used the same casing design and materials as the previous boosters, the change in thrust was obtained from adding a nozzle to the end. The third test motor (SL-3) remains in the test silo to this day.
