= Sea Dragon (rocket) =

1962 concept for a reusable, sea-launched rocket

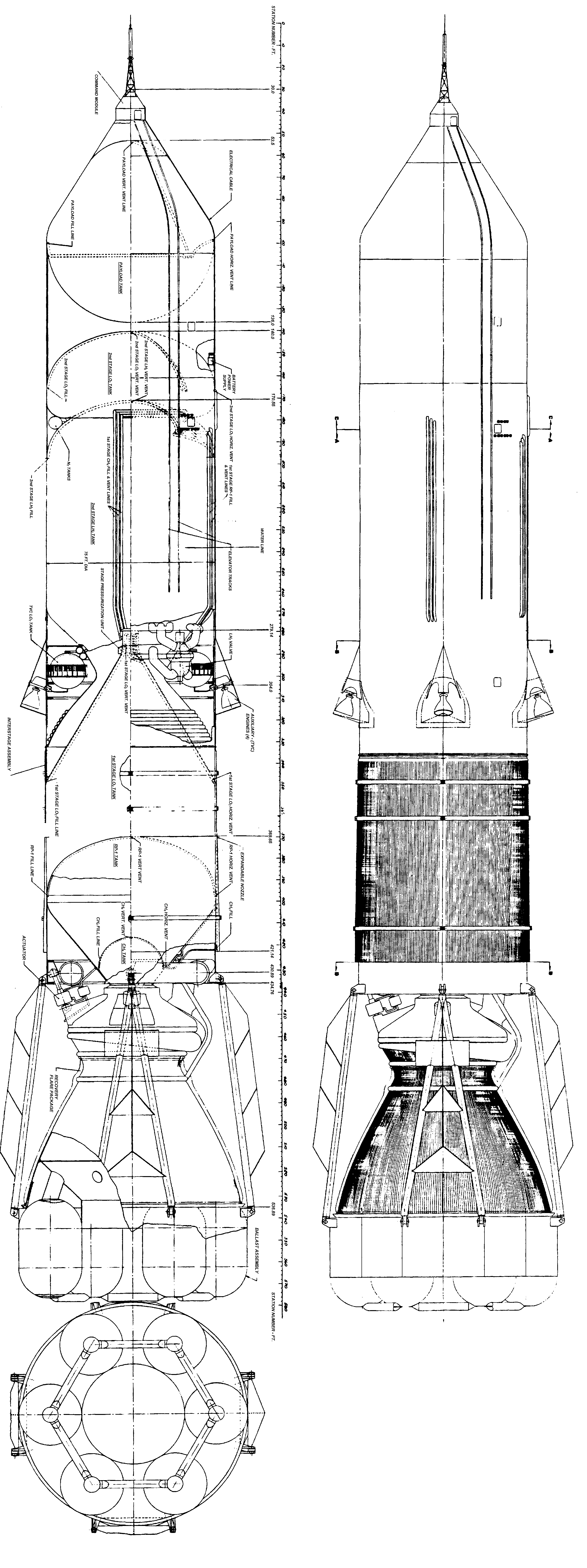
- Sea Dragon internal and external views. Both show the ballast tank attached to the first-stage engine bell. An Apollo CSM-like spacecraft is mounted on top.
- Function: Orbital super heavy-lift launch vehicle
- Country of origin: United States

Size
- Height: 150 m (490 ft)
- Diameter: 23 m (75 ft)
- Mass: 18,143 t (39,998,000 lb)
- Stages: 2

Capacity

Payload to LEO
- Altitude: 229 km (124 nmi)
- Mass: 550 t (1,210,000 lb)

First stage
- Powered by: 1 engine
- Maximum thrust: 355.8 MN (80,000,000 lbf) at sea level
- Specific impulse: 242 s
- Burn time: 81 seconds
- Propellant: RP-1 / LOX

Second stage
- Powered by: 1 engine
- Maximum thrust: 62.80 MN (14,120,000 lbf) vacuum
- Specific impulse: 409 s
- Burn time: 260 seconds
- Propellant: LH_{2} / LOX

Vernier stage
- Powered by: 4 engines
- Maximum thrust: 236.6 kN (53,200 lbf) each
- Burn time: 1340 seconds
- Propellant: LH_{2} / LOX

The Sea Dragon was a 1962 conceptualized design study for a reusable two-stage sea-launched orbital super heavy-lift launch vehicle. The project was led by Robert Truax while working at Aerojet, one of several designs he created intended to be launched by floating the rocket in the ocean. Although there was some interest at both NASA and Todd Shipyards, the project was not implemented.

With dimensions of 150 m (490 ft) long and 23 m (75 ft) in diameter, Sea Dragon would have been the largest rocket ever built. It is comparable to other unbuilt concepts such as Convair's Nexus and Super Nexus, Boeing's Large Multipurpose Launch Vehicle, Phillip Bono's series of reusable single stage launch vehicles, and various NOVA Post-Saturn launch vehicles.

== Design ==
Truax's basic idea was to produce a low-cost heavy launcher, a concept now called "big dumb booster." To lower the cost of operation, the rocket itself was launched from the ocean and constructed in a shipyard with more standard materials. A large ballast tank system attached to the bottom of the first-stage engine bell was used to orient the rocket vertically for launch. In this orientation the payload at the top of the second stage was just above the waterline, making it easy to access. Truax had already experimented with this basic system in the Sea Bee (Note: Sea Bee was a proof of principle program to validate the sea-launch concept. A surplus Aerobee rocket was modified so that it could be fired underwater. The rocket worked properly the first time in restrained mode. Later tests of repeat firings proved so simple that the cost of turn-around was about 7% that of a new unit.) and Sea Horse. (Note: Sea Horse demonstrated sea-launch at a larger scale and on a rocket with a complex set of guidance and control systems. It used a surplus 9,000 kgf (20,000 lbf; 88,000 N) pressure fed, acid/aniline Corporal missile on a barge in San Francisco Bay. This was first fired several metres above the water, then lowered and fired in successive steps until reaching a considerable depth. Firing from underwater posed no problems and there was substantial noise attenuation.) To lower the cost of the rocket, he intended it to be built of inexpensive materials, specifically 8 mm (0.31 in) steel sheeting. The rocket would be built at a sea-side shipbuilder and towed to sea for launch. It would use wide engineering margins with strong simple materials to further enhance reliability and reduce cost and complexity. The system would be at least partially reusable with passive reentry and recovery of rocket sections for refurbishment and relaunch.

The first stage was to be powered by a single pressure-fed 36,300,000 kgf (356 MN; 80,000,000 lbf) thrust engine burning RP-1 and LOX (liquid oxygen). The tank pressure was 32 atm (3,200 kPa; 470 psi) for the RP-1 and 17 atm (1,700 kPa; 250 psi) for the LOX, providing a chamber pressure of 20 atm (2,000 kPa; 290 psi) at liftoff. The first stage would also be equipped with an asbestos-based recovery heat shield for reuse of the vehicle. At first stage burnout, 81 seconds into flight, the vehicle would be 25 miles (40 km) up and 20 mi (32 km) downrange, traveling at a speed of 4,000 mph (6,400 km/h; 1.8 km/s). The normal mission profile would see the first stage land in a high-speed splashdown some 180 miles (290 km) downrange.

The noise of the first-stage engine, which would have produced a sound pressure level (SPL) of approximately 184 dB at liftoff, would have created an extremely challenging sonic and vibrational environment for a traditional land-based launch pad. This issue was common point of issue for vehicles around the scale of Sea Dragon. One solution, proposed by Philip Bono, was the “water-filled acoustic limiter,” which consisted of a parabolic dish filled with water installed beneath the launchpad. However, the size and supporting infrastructure required for such a system would have significantly increased launchpad construction costs. Truax’s design team avoided these construction costs by adopting the ocean-launch concept.

The second stage was equipped with a single extremely large pressure-fed hydrolox engine with a thrust of 6,404,000 kgf (62.80 MN; 14,120,000 lbf), fed at a constant lower pressure of 7 atm (710 kPa; 100 psi). At the end of the entire 260s burn, the second stage would be at 142 mi (229 km) in altitude and 584 mi (940 km) downrange. To improve second stage engine performance, the engine featured an expanding engine bell which covered most of the first stage tankage, acting as an aeroshell for the first stage during ascent. During the events of staging, this expandable nozzle would go from a linear to a more conical shape, improving the second stage's expansion ratio.

To provide attitude stabilization, the second stage was also equipped with four auxiliary hydrolox engines, each producing 24,130 kgf (236.6 kN; 53,200 lbf) of thrust. These engines served as the vehicle's primary Thrust Vector Control (TVC) system; they provided roll control during the first-stage burn and full attitude control (pitch, yaw, and roll) for the second stage. To ensure reliability, these auxiliary engines were ignited and monitored on the ocean surface shortly before the first-stage main engine start. They would remain active for a total of 1340 seconds, continuing to burn after the second stage main engine shutdown to provide the final velocity increment required for orbital injection.

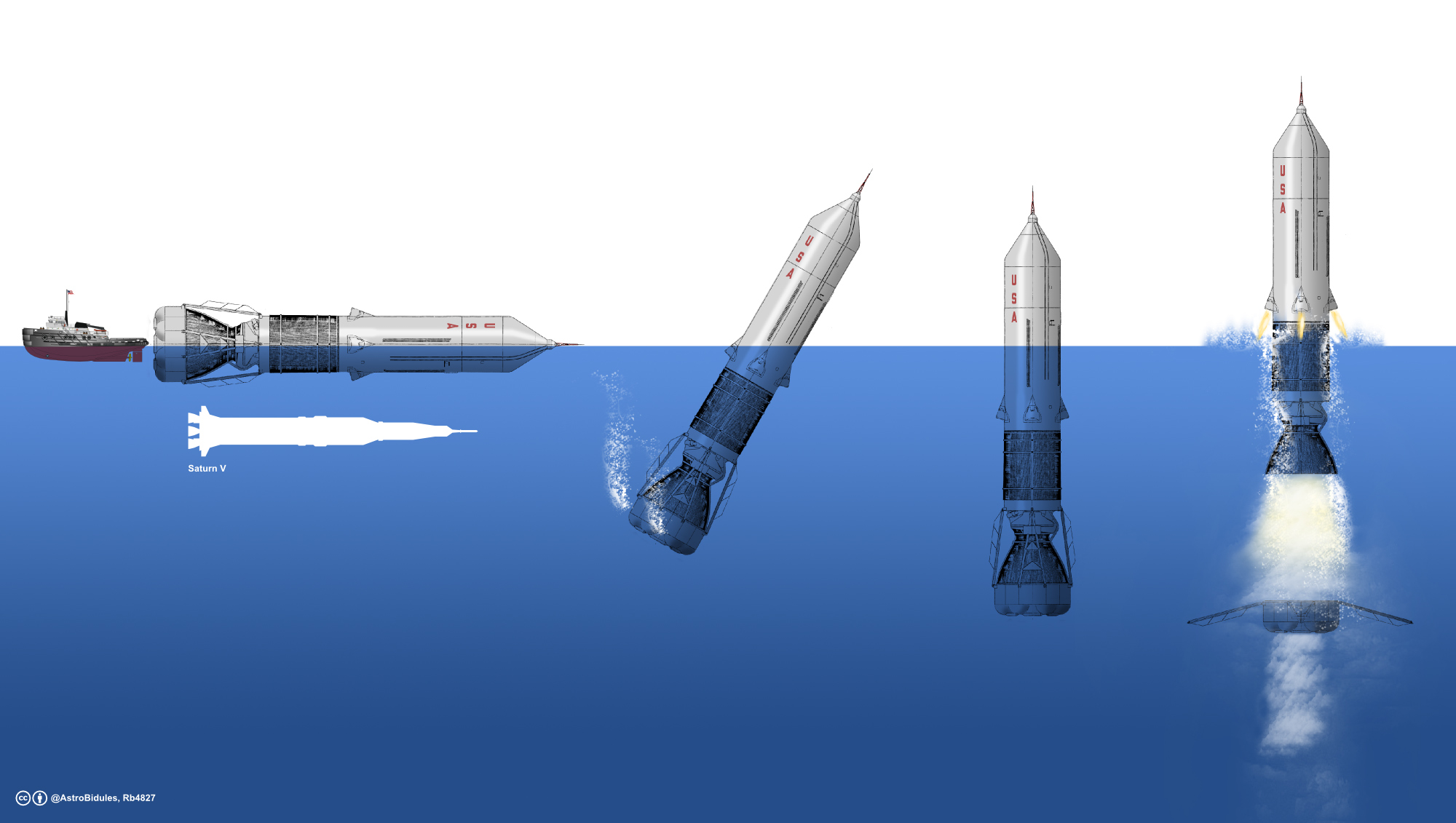
Principle of the Sea Dragon (Scale is incorrect)

A typical launch sequence would start with the rocket being refurbished and mated to its cargo and ballast tanks on shore. The RP-1 would also be loaded at this point. The rocket would then be towed to a launch site, where the LOX and LH2 would be generated on-site using electrolysis; Truax suggested using a nuclear-powered aircraft carrier as a power supply during this phase. The ballast tanks, which also served as a cap and protection for the first-stage engine bell, would then be filled with water, sinking the rocket to vertical with the second stage above the waterline. Last-minute checks could then be carried out and the rocket launched.

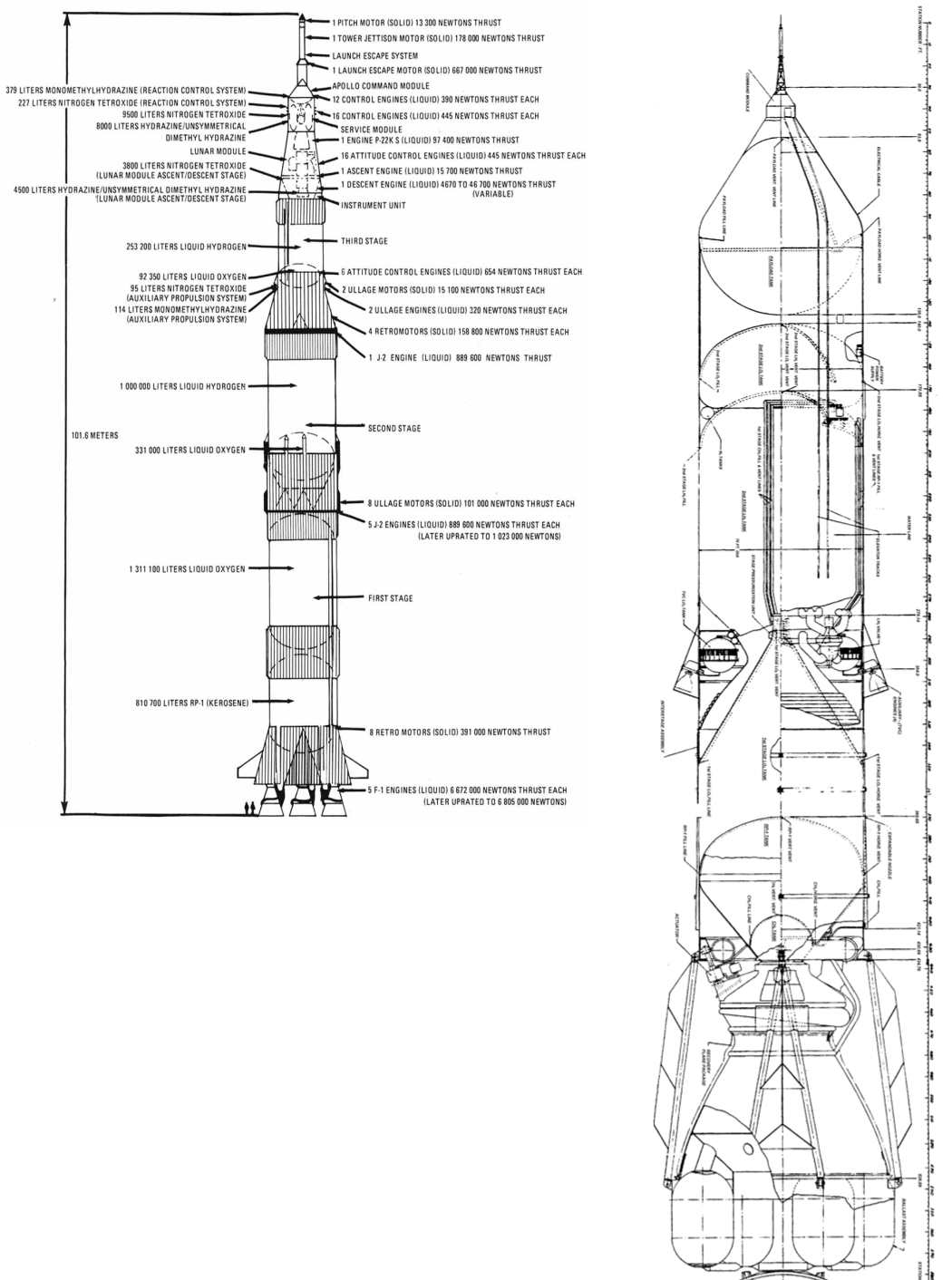
Composite of two NASA technical drawings, of the Saturn V rocket and the proposed Sea Dragon rocket, to the same scale. The second stage of the Saturn V would fit inside the first-stage engine and nozzle of the Sea Dragon.

The rocket would have been able to carry a payload of up to 550 tonnes (540 long tons; 610 short tons) or 550,000 kg (1,210,000 lb) into LEO. This is enough to comfortably launch the ISS in a single launch (which weighs a "mere" 450 tonnes (440 long tons; 500 short tons)). Payload costs, in 1963, were estimated to be between $59 and $600 per kg (roughly $630 to $6,400 per kg in 2025 dollars, for comparison the Falcon 9 is estimated to cost ~$3,100 per kg in 2025.) TRW (Space Technology Laboratories, Inc.) conducted a program review and validated the design and its expected costs. However, budget pressures led to the closing of the Future Projects Branch, ending work on the super-heavy launchers for a proposed crewed mission to Mars.

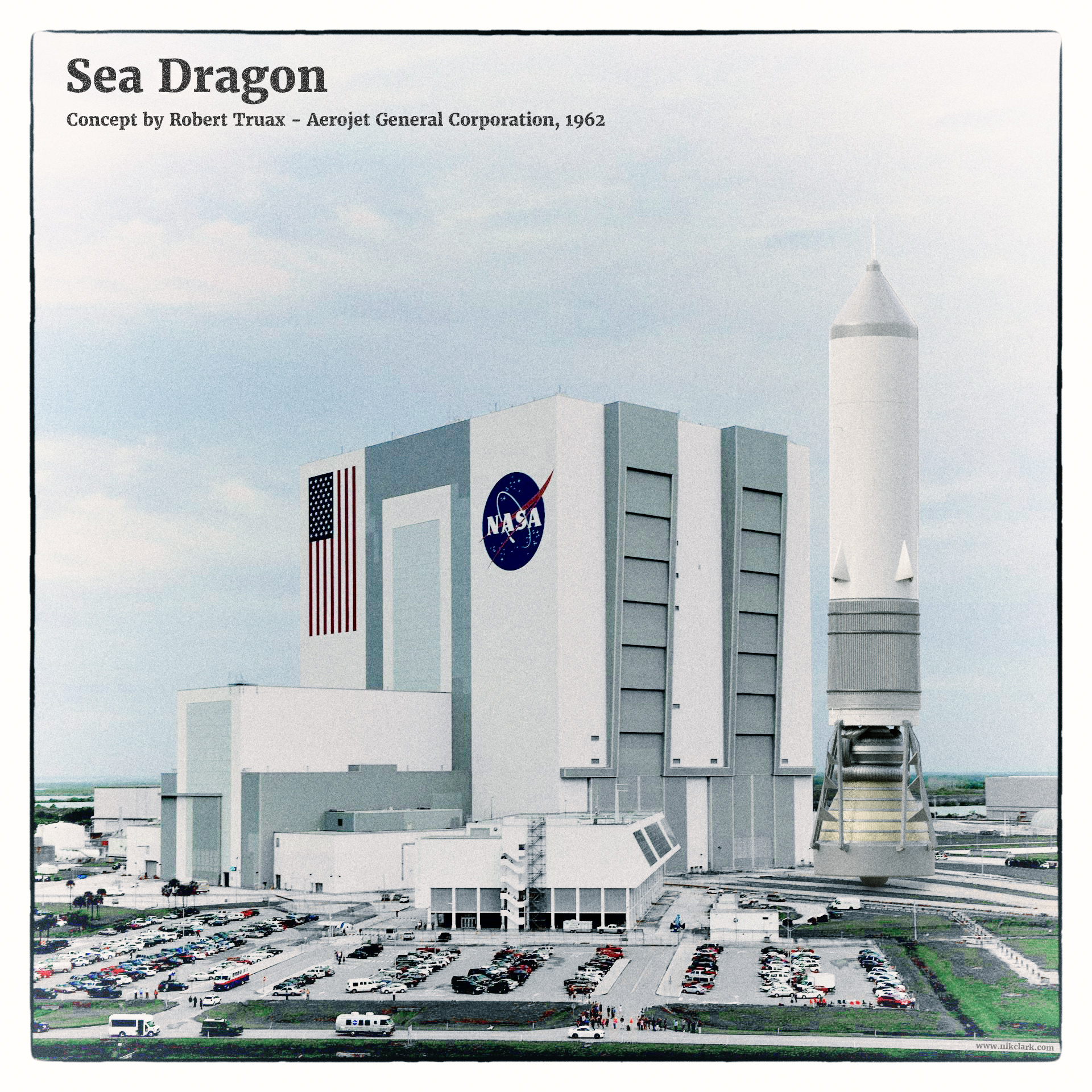
A composite visualization of the Sea Dragon standing in front of the NASA Vehicle Assembly Building for scale.

== Sea Dragon in fiction ==
The Sea Dragon appears in the first-season finale of the 2019 Apple TV+ series For All Mankind, set in an alternate history timeline in which the 1960s-era space race did not end. In a scene set in 1983, a Sea Dragon is depicted launching from the Pacific Ocean on live television. Dialogue indicates that a carrier task force is present as a security measure, and that the ocean launch is intended as a safety measure because the payload includes plutonium.

== See also ==
- Aquarius (rocket)
