= Aerojet =

Defunct American rocket and missile propulsion manufacturer

- Type: Manufacturer
- Founded: 1942; 84 years ago
- Defunct: 2013; 13 years ago
- Fate: Merged
- Successor: Aerojet Rocketdyne
- Headquarters: Rancho Cordova, California, U.S.
- Products: Rocket and missile propulsion
- Parent: GenCorp, Inc.

Aerojet was an American rocket and missile propulsion manufacturer based primarily in Rancho Cordova, California, with divisions in Redmond, Washington, Orange and Gainesville in Virginia, and Camden, Arkansas. Aerojet was owned by GenCorp, Inc., In 2013, Aerojet was merged by GenCorp with the former Pratt & Whitney Rocketdyne to form Aerojet Rocketdyne.

== History ==
Aerojet developed from a 1936 meeting hosted by Theodore von Kármán at his home. Joining von Kármán, who was at the time director of Guggenheim Aeronautical Laboratory at the California Institute of Technology, were a number of Caltech professors and students, including rocket scientist and astrophysicist Fritz Zwicky and explosives expert Jack Parsons, all of whom were interested in the topic of spaceflight. The group continued to occasionally meet, but its activities were limited to discussions rather than experimentation.

Their first design was tested on August 16, 1941, consisting of a small cylindrical solid-fuel motor attached to the bottom of a plane. Takeoff distance was shortened by half, and the USAAF placed an order for experimental production versions.

=== Founding ===
The US Army Air Force wanted GALCIT to manufacture JATO (jet-assist take-off) engines, but GALCIT was primarily interested in research, and Caltech had no interest to become involved in military production. In 1942 von Kármán, Parsons, Frank Malina, Ed Forman, Martin Summerfield and Andrew G. Haley founded the Aerojet Engineering Corporation.

Some aspects of the early operation of the company were described by von Kármán in his autobiography:

On March 19, 1942, Haley obtained our incorporation papers and the Aerojet Engineering Corporation was launched. I was President; Malina was Treasurer; and Haley was Secretary. We had three vice-presidents: Parsons, Summerfield, and Forman. We issued stock to ourselves, and for a brief time Haley seemed to own the entire corporation because, being the only man in the group with cash, he actually put up all the initial capital. We opened offices on East Colorado Street in Pasadena ... we moved to ... 285 West Colorado Street...Thus began ... the world's largest manufacturer of rockets and propellants. In only twenty years it was to grow from six people with a capitalization of $1200 into a 700-million-dollar a year business, a staff of nearly 34,000, and a key role in the modern defense picture of the United States. Kármán soon relinquished the presidency: "Haley became Aerojet's second president on August 26, 1942. He proved to be an incredible administrator."

The company expanded and acquired new facilities: "In October, fifteen employees were drawing paychecks. By December we had expanded to about one hundred and fifty employees and in January 1943 we moved to Azusa, California." In 1943 the Army Air Forces finally placed a full order, demanding that 2000 rockets be delivered before year's end.

The difficulty of starting out in an industry with no history explains how the founders lost control:

Unhappily for us, no bank would lend us money; bankers hadn't yet come to think of rocketry as a stable business.

In the spring of 1944 the officers instructed Haley to seek out new sources of assistance. General Tire & Rubber Company was one of his clients and that company showed an interest in Aerojet and began negotiations. In January 1945, General Tire acquired half the stock for $75,000. Parsons and Forman also sold their shares, so that, by October, General Tire had control of the majority of Aerojet.

Kármán resisted the offers presented to him, until in 1953 when a sizable scholarship fund was offered to be set up as a memorial to his sister Josephine de Karman.

=== General Tire & Rubber Company ===
The company also invested in pure rocket research, developing both a liquid-fueled design and a new solid-fueled design based on a rubber binding agent in partnership with General Tire & Rubber Company. In the immediate post-war era, Aerojet downsized dramatically, but their JATO (jet-assisted take-off) units continued to sell for commercial aircraft operating in hot-and-high conditions.

By 1950, their research into the rubber binder had led to much larger engines and then to the development of the Aerobee sounding rocket. Aerobee was the first U.S.-designed rocket to reach space (albeit not orbit) and completed over 1,000 flights before it was retired in 1985. Aerojet designed and built a total of 1,182 engines for all four incarnations of the Titan rockets, which were used for civilian projects ranging from Gemini's crewed flights to solar system explorations including Viking, Voyager, and Cassini. The then recently formed US Air Force selected Aerojet as their primary supplier on a number of ICBM projects, including the Titan and Minuteman missiles. They also delivered propulsion systems for the US Navy's submarine-launched Polaris missile. A new plant was set up in Rancho Cordova that took over most rocket construction, while the original Azusa offices returned primarily to research. One of Azusa's major projects was the development of the infra-red detectors for the Defense Support Program satellites, used to detect ICBM launches from space. The new research arm was formed as Aerojet Electro-Systems Corp., and after purchasing a number of ordnance companies, Aerojet Ordnance was created as well. A new umbrella organization oversaw the three major divisions, Aerojet General.

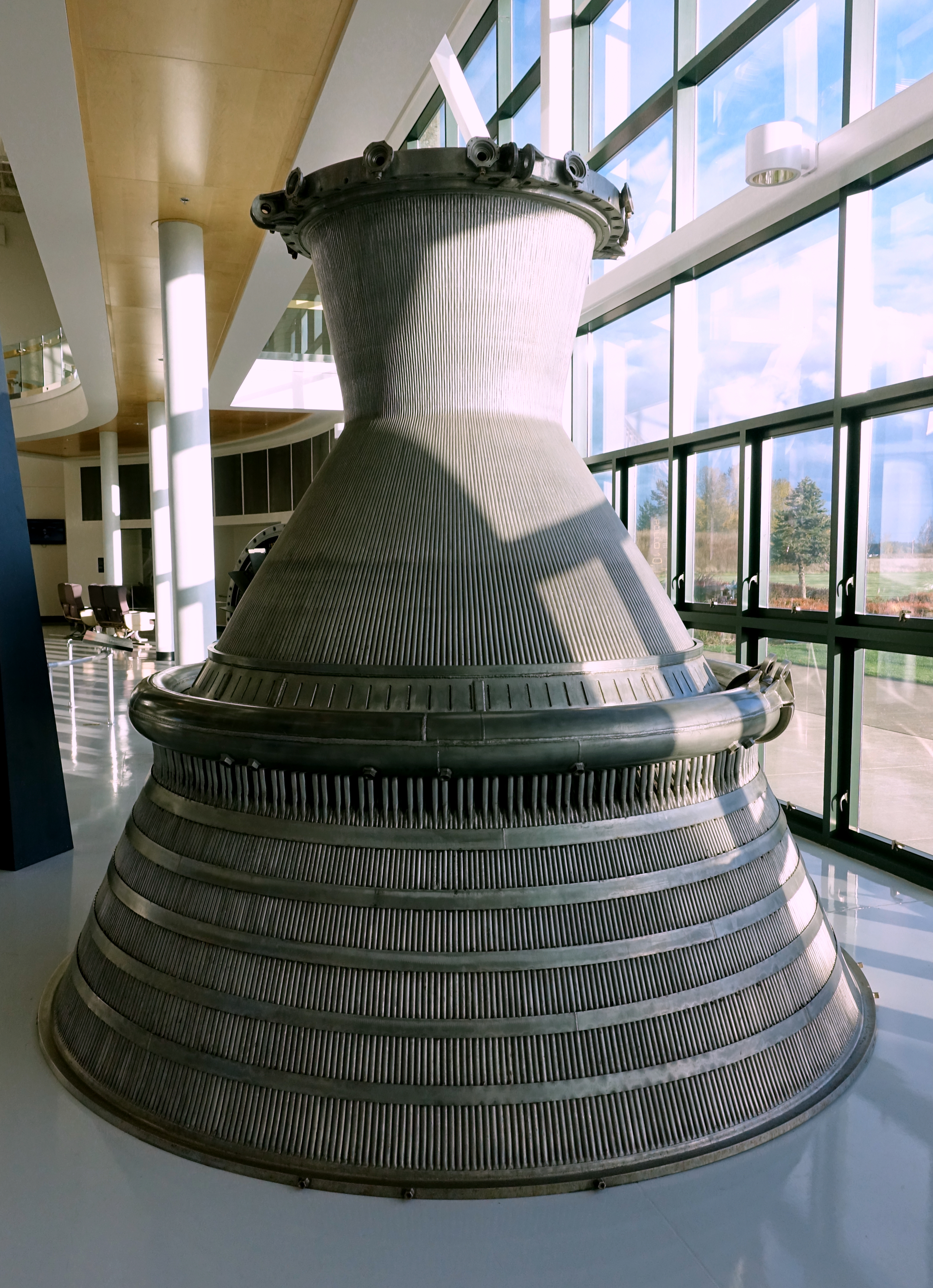
Aerojet General's M-1 rocket engine

President Kennedy's challenge to place a man on the Moon by the end of the 1960s led to increased civilian work at Aerojet. Previously, they had repeatedly lost contracts for large engines for the Saturn and Nova boosters, being designed in the late 1950s, often to their rival Rocketdyne, but in the end were selected to develop and build the main engine for the Apollo Command/Service Module. In 1962 they were also selected to design a new upper-stage engine to replace the cluster of five J-2s used on the Saturn second stage in the post-Apollo era, but work on their resulting M-1 design was ended in 1965 when it became clear the public's support for a massive space program was waning.

During this period, Aerojet built a large concrete pad in San Ramon, California, for the purpose of rocket engine testing for the space program. Before it got used, President Johnson and NASA decided to move these activities to the upcoming space center in Houston, Texas.

Similar work continued in the 1970s, delivering the second-stage motor for the MX missile, the Orbital Maneuvering System (OMS) for the Space Shuttle, and the first U.S.-designed cluster bombs. A contract for 30-mm ammunition for the A-10 Thunderbolt II was so extensive that new branch plants were set up in Downey and Chino in 1978. Aerojet also purchased a number of other firms over this period, and their plant in Jonesborough, Tennessee developed the use of depleted uranium ordnance. To this day they are the primary supplier of these weapons. Their electronics and ordnance divisions also collaborated on the SADARM 8" anti-armor artillery round, but this was never put into production.

Aerojet General briefly attempted an expansion into shipbuilding in the mid-1960s, purchasing the Gibbs Gas Engine shipyard near their existing Florida facility, completing the construction of two research ships for NOAA (which had halted when Gibbs went bankrupt) and beginning construction of three more under an existing contract. The financial losses incurred just from the completion of the original two ships led them to sell the shipyard shortly after the new construction began, and sue the Federal government for allegedly misleading them on the cost overruns inherited from Gibbs.

The 1980s saw a brief revival of the aerospace business during President Ronald Reagan's Strategic Defense Initiative program, but the company shrank during the late 1980s and into the 1990s.

=== 1990s ===
As Aerojet downsized, many of their industrial plants were idled, and the company looked for ways to capitalize them. Their massive investment in chemical mixing equipment used to build their solid-fuel rockets was later leased to third parties, notably pharmaceutical companies, under the name Aerojet Fine Chemicals. The division was later sold. Aerojet Real Estate was more direct in its actions, leasing entire Aerojet buildings and selling off undeveloped Aerojet land. It owned approximately 12,600 acres (51 km^{2}), located 15 miles (24 km) east of downtown Sacramento.

The remaining research and development sections of Aerojet were organized into the Aerospace and Defense division (ADS). They continued to develop and produce liquid-fuel, solid-fuel, and air-breathing engines for strategic and tactical missiles, precision strike missiles, and interceptors required for missile defense. Product applications for defense systems included strategic and tactical missile motors; maneuvering propulsion systems; attitude control systems; and warhead assemblies used in precision weapon systems and missile defense, as well as airframe structures required on the F-22 Raptor aircraft and fire suppression systems for military and commercial vehicles. Their space-related products included liquid-fuel engines for expendable and reusable launch vehicles, upper-stage engines, satellite propulsion, large solid boosters, and integrated propulsion subsystems.

Aerojet qualified a 4.5-kW Hall effect thruster electric propulsion system based on technology licensed from the Busek Corporation. Aerojet is under contract to Lockheed Martin to provide the first two shipsets of the new thruster system for the next generation Advanced Extremely High Frequency (AEHF) system, a US Air Force program. Research into the next generation of advanced or "green" monopropellant engines met with mixed success in the 1990s. HAN engines developed under contract to the US Air Force and Missile Defense Agency provided proof of concept.

=== Recent history ===
Aerojet was owned by GenCorp, Inc., which is headquartered in Rancho Cordova, California. GenCorp, Inc. was known as the General Tire & Rubber Company until 1984. On April 27, 2015, the corporate name of the company was officially changed from GenCorp, Inc. to Aerojet Rocketdyne Holdings, Inc. to honor the company's heritage of continuous product innovation and mission success and to recognize its significant contributions to national defense and space exploration for more than 70 years.

From 2002, Aerojet grew steadily to more than 3,500 employees in 2008. Aerojet's rocket engine for the Delta II second-stage completed a record 268 successful mission launches since 1960 on February 6, 2009.

NASA chose Aerojet to provide the primary design and development of Orion (spacecraft) propulsion systems for the Constellation program. In November 2010, Aerojet was selected by NASA for consideration for potential contract awards for heavy lift launch vehicle system concepts and propulsion technologies.

In July 2012, GenCorp, Inc. announced that it was buying Aerojet's competitor, Pratt & Whitney Rocketdyne; the acquisition was completed in 2013.

== Florida facility and canal ==
Aerojet solid fuel technology was under consideration for use in Apollo's Saturn V first stages. In 1963, the U.S. Air Force provided Aerojet General with $3 million in funding to start construction of a manufacturing and testing site several miles southwest of Homestead, Florida. Aerojet acquired the land for the plant less than five miles from Everglades National Park. A facility was constructed where the motors could be built and tested (25.362392°N 80.560649°W). SW 232nd Avenue was renamed "Aerojet Road".

A monolithic 21-foot-diameter (6.4 m) rocket motor known as the Aerojet 260 was designed, which was too big to be transported by rail. A plan was devised where the rocket motors would be transported by barge to Cape Canaveral. To facilitate barges, a canal was dug (C-111) and a drawbridge installed for the U.S. Highway 1 crossing at mile marker 116 (25.289609°N 80.444786°W). This canal became the southernmost freshwater canal in Southeast Florida and was dubbed the "Aerojet Canal". Efforts are being made to remediate the long term environmental damage caused by the canal, which include the redirection of fresh water from Taylor Slough and thus Florida Bay to Barnes Sound. Additionally, a concrete silo was constructed for the rocket motor, 180 feet (55 m) deep into the Everglades.

Aerojet needed a cylindrical chamber that would withstand the force and power a space-faring rocket would cause. Aerojet subcontracted the fabrication of 260-inch (6.6 m) diameter, 79-foot (24 m) long chamber. The chambers were designed in short-length, meaning half the size of what the final product would be, hence the names given to the test rockets, SL-1, SL-2 and SL-3. Both motors used a propellant burning rate and nozzle size appropriate for the full length design and were capable of about 3,500,000 pounds-force (1,600,000 kgf) thrust for 114 seconds. The large amount of propellant needed for such a rocket was manufactured at the Everglades plant.

An ignition motor, a knocked-down Polaris missile B3 first stage known as “Blowtorch,” was used to jump-start the motor. Between Sept. 25, 1965 and June 17, 1967, three static test firings were done. SL-1 was fired at night, and the flame was clearly visible from Miami 31 miles (50 km) away, producing over 3,000,000 pounds-force (1,400,000 kgf) of thrust. SL-2 was fired with similar success and relatively uneventful. SL-3, the third and what would be the final test rocket, used a partially submerged nozzle and produced 5,900,000 pounds-force (2,670,000 kgf) of thrust, making it the largest solid-fuel rocket ever.

Problems arose during the third test when, near burnout, the rocket nozzle was ejected, causing propellant made of hydrochloric acids to be spread across wetlands in the Everglades and a few crop fields and homes in Homestead. Many residents of Homestead complained about the damage done, which included paint damage to their cars and the loss of thousands of dollars' worth of crops.

By 1969, NASA had decided to go with liquid-fueled engines for the Saturn V rockets, causing the workers of the Everglades plant to be laid off and the abandonment of the facility. In 1986, after NASA had awarded the Space Shuttle booster contract to Morton Thiokol of Utah, Aerojet sued the State of Florida, exercised its options and pulled out of South Florida for good. The company sold most of its land holdings to the South Dade Land Corporation for $6 million. After unsuccessfully trying to farm it, the corporation sold it to Florida for $12 million. County and federal courts, and numerous lawyers, were kept busy for years with lawsuits between Aerojet, Dade County and the State of Florida.

After sadly losing the Shuttle contract in 1986, Aerojet later traded its remaining 5,100 acres (2,100 ha) in the wetlands of South Dade for 55,000 acres (22,000 ha) of environmentally sensitive land belonging to the U.S. Bureau of Land Management in Nevada. Those 5,100 acres surrounding the factory site are now controlled by the South Florida Water Management District and the Florida Fish and Wildlife Conservation Commission as a nature preserve. The Aerojet signage still remains for both the road and canal, and although weather-damaged, most of the facility's buildings remain intact. The Nevada property was sold by Aerojet in 1996 to be used for the unbuilt planned community Coyote Springs, Nevada.

The AJ-260-2 rocket motor remains in the silo to this day. In 2013, the massive shed structure covering the silo was dismantled and the silo covered with several 33-short-ton (30 t) concrete beams.

The facility was the subject of documentaries Space-Miami and Aerojet Dade: An Unfinished Journey. An urban exploration visit to the site in 2007 was also featured in the documentary Urban Explorers: Into the Darkness.

== EPA Superfund sites ==
Aerojet's manufacture, testing and disposal methods led to toxic contamination of both the land and groundwater in the Rancho Cordova area, leading to the designation of a Superfund site. Solvents such as trichloroethylene (TCE) and chloroform and rocket fuel by-products such as N-Nitrosodimethylamine (NDMA) and perchlorate were discovered in drinking water wells near Aerojet in 1979. Since then, two State agencies and the Environmental Protection Agency have been working with Aerojet to ensure that the company cleans up pollution caused by its operations at the site. Under state and federal enforcement orders, Aerojet installed several systems on the borders of its property to pump out and treat contaminated groundwater. Aerojet has also conducted a number of removal actions for onsite soils, liquids, and sludges. In 2003, groundwater sampling data revealed a plume of contamination extending northwest under Carmichael.

Discovery of TCE contamination at the Sacramento facility also led Aerojet to look into possible contamination of the groundwater at Aerojet's Azusa facility, where much of the testing of JATO's and Rocket engines was conducted before those operations were moved to Sacramento. In 1980, it was announced that there was TCE contamination in the groundwater at Aerojet's facility in Azusa in a hearing chaired by State Senator Esteben Torres. In 1985, it was declared a Superfund Site by the EPA as San Gabriel Superfund Site II and the cleanup done under the Baldwin Park Operable Unit. In 1997, it was also discovered that there was also NDMA and Ammonium Perchlorate contamination in this plume and that Aerojet was once again labeled a Potentially Responsible Party (PRP) in this action. Aerojet sold this facility in 2001 to Northrop Grumman Corporation.

Aerojet's disposal of toxic material occurred 20 years prior to the establishment of a provisional perchlorate RfD limit of 0.0001 mg/kg/day in 1992 (to have been achieved by all companies by 1995). This limit was increased to 0.0009 mg/kg/day in 1998, and prior to the results from NAS studies, the limit was reduced to 0.00004 mg/kg/day in 2002. The NAS studies disputed the 0.00004 limit, and recommended its current limit of 0.0007 mg/kg/day.

== Products ==
=== Aerobee ===
The Aerobee rocket was one of the United States' most produced and productive sounding rockets. Developed by the Aerojet Corporation, the Aerobee was designed to combine the altitude and launching capability of the V-2 with the cost effectiveness and mass production of the WAC Corporal. More than 1000 Aerobees were launched between 1947 and 1985, returning vast amounts of astronomical, physical, aeronomical, and biomedical data.

=== Aerojet General X-8 ===
The Aerojet General X-8 was an unguided, spin-stabilized sounding rocket designed to launch a 150 lb (68 kg) payload to 200,000 feet (61.0 km). The X-8 was a version of the prolific Aerobee rocket family.

=== 1.8KS7800 ===
1.8KS7800 is a solid propellant rocket engine designed by Aerojet. It is used in the AIM-7A, AIM7B and AIM7C Sparrow missiles and the Aerobee 300-300A sounding rocket. The designation 1.8KS7800 means that the engine burns during 1.8 seconds and generates 7,800 pounds of thrust. It had a vacuum thrust of 35kN and chamber pressure of 1000 psi. In a vacuum, it has a specific impulse of 238.8s and a mass flow of 32.09 lb/s. It is approximately 1.3m in length and 0.2 meters in diameter.

== See also ==
- Scout (rocket) – Aerojet manufactured the "Algol" first stage of this USAF/NASA orbital launch vehicle
- Bristol Aerojet – joint venture in the UK with Bristol Aeroplane Company
- Robert Truax
- Sea Dragon (rocket)
- Aquarius Launch Vehicle
