= Aerojet Rocketdyne AR1 =

Rocket engine using oxidizer-rich staged combustion, 2.2 MN thrust

AR-1
- Country of origin: United States
- Designer: Aerojet Rocketdyne
- Application: Booster
- Status: CDR completed, not selected by ULA

Liquid-fuel engine
- Propellant: LOX / RP-1
- Cycle: Staged combustion

Performance
- Thrust, vacuum: 2,500 kN (560,000 lbf)
- Thrust, sea-level: 2,224 kN (500,000 lbf)

The Aerojet Rocketdyne AR1 is a 2,200-kilonewton-class (500,000 lbf) thrust RP-1/LOX oxidizer-rich staged combustion cycle rocket engine project.

The engine was conceived in 2014, and received US government funding to build a prototype engine in 2016. By 2018, the USAF had committed US$295 million of government funding to develop the engine and build an initial engine prototype, while Aerojet will put US$86 million of private capital into the project through the prototype build. As of 2019, there have been no plans to take the AR1 to full production.

== History ==
Aerojet Rocketdyne proposed in 2014 to "lobby the government to fund an all-new, U.S.-sourced rocket propulsion system." In June 2014, Aerojet initially projected it would cost under US$25 million per pair of engines, not including the up to US$1 billion estimated development cost to be funded by the government. Later in 2014, the US Congress passed a law requiring the US Air Force to "develop a new propulsion system by 2019 to replace the RD-180 engine" that powers Atlas V used by United Launch Alliance (ULA), because the engine is Russian-made, along with the Russian conflict with Crimea. Dynetics is a key partner in development of the AR1 engine. Under a joint venture agreement, Dynetics is to supply elements of the engine's main propulsion system, the ignition system, and ground support equipment, along with analysis support to critical engine designs.

ULA announced in early February 2015 that they were considering undertaking domestic production of the Russian RD-180 engine at its Decatur, Alabama rocket manufacturing facility, and made assurances that the US-manufactured engines would be used only for government civil (NASA) or commercial launches, and would not be used for US military launches. ULA CEO Tory Bruno indicated that ULA was also evaluating the AR1 option, along with the US manufacture of the RD-180 by ULA under license, as backup options to the primary option ULA was then pursuing for the Atlas V successor, subsequently named Vulcan, with the Blue Origin BE-4 methane/LOX engine.

As of 2015, ULA was targeting a maiden flight of Vulcan to be no earlier than 2019. For this engine competition, the AR1 engine had the advantage of matching the fuel configuration of the Atlas V launch vehicle. However, it was disadvantaged by being much earlier in the development process for a new rocket engine to replace the high performing RD-180 engine.

In February 2015, the USAF released the results of its analysis of the project to build a new US government-funded engine in five years, and said that the "2019 deadline was too aggressive given that it would likely take six to eight years to develop an alternate U.S.-built engine, plus another year or two to integrate the new engine with existing rockets." Aerojet Rocketdyne had stated a commitment to delivering the AR1 in 2019. In September 2015, AJR made an offer to buy ULA for US$2 billion. Shortly thereafter however, ULA and Blue Origin announced a joint agreement to expand production capabilities in order to manufacture the BE-4 rocket engine currently in development and test. ULA also reconfirmed that the decision on using the BE-4 vs. AJR AR1 for the new Vulcan rocket would not be made until late 2016 at the earliest.

In early 2016, the U.S. Air Force awarded a US$115 million contract to Aerojet Rocketdyne for development of the AR1 engine to be completed in 2019. Contract options could increase government funding up to $536 million. Aerojet had received US$228 million in funding for AR1 through June 2017. In April 2017, Aerojet announced that the AR1 would be built in a new factory planned to be built in Huntsville, Alabama. Aerojet completed the AR1's Critical Design Review (CDR) in May 2017.

In February 2018, Aerojet began negotiating with the U.S. Air Force to reduce the company's financial contribution to the development of the AR1 engine to one-sixth of the costs (from a previously agreed one-third). Up to that date, AJR had "spent US$86.1 million on AR1 research and development, out of total costs incurred to date of US$236.6 million." By June 2018, the USAF had renegotiated the agreement with AJR and decreased the Air Force's contribution to $295 million, which is 5/6ths of the total cost. AJR is adding no additional private funds into the engine development effort after early 2018. The revised contract requires that AJR complete a prototype engine by the end of 2019.

In September 2018, ULA announced that the BE-4 engine would power the first stage of the Vulcan.

In October 2019, Rocketdyne announced a working agreement with Firefly Aerospace for the AR1 engine to power Firefly's planned Beta launcher.

== See also ==
- RD-191 by NPO Energomash
- Raptor by SpaceX
