= Robert Truax =

American rocket engineer (1917–2010)

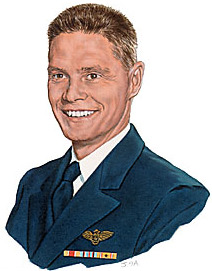
- Captain Robert C. Truax (USN)
- Born: September 3, 1917; Gary, Indiana, US
- Died: September 17, 2010 (aged 93); Valley Center, California, US
- Education: U.S. Naval Academy (BSc ME, 1939); NPS (BS Aero); Iowa State College (MS nuclear eng)
- Known for: Skycycle X-2
- Spouses: Rosalind Heath Schroeder (m. 1941; div. 1964); Sally Sabins (m. 1964; died 1993); Marisol Guzman (m. 1994)
- Children: four with 1st wife Rosalind two with 2nd wife Sally
- Scientific career
- Fields: Aerospace engineering
- Workplaces: 1939–1959: United States Navy; 1959–1966: Aerojet; 1966– : Truax Engineering

Notes
- The Salvage 1 TV character was loosely based on Truax

Captain Robert C. Truax (USN) (September 3, 1917 – September 17, 2010) was an American rocket engineer in the United States Navy, and companies such as Aerojet and Truax Engineering, which he founded. Truax was a proponent of low-cost rocket engine and vehicle designs.

== Life ==
As a teenager, Truax was inspired by Robert Goddard articles in Popular Mechanics magazine to build his own rockets while residing in Alameda, California. From 1936 to 1939, midshipman Truax tested liquid-fuel rocket motors and published a February 1939 report in Astronautics. In 1938, he showed a thrust chamber that he had constructed to the British Interplanetary Society and wrote technical reports published by the American Rocket Society.

Following two years' sea duty, first on USS Enterprise (CV-6) and then a destroyer, then-Lieutenant Commander Truax worked at the Engineering Experiment Station at Annapolis in the Bureau of Aeronautics Ship Installations Division under Commander C. A. Bolster. Truax headed the Navy Development Project (ensigns R. C. Stiff, J. F. Patton, W. Schubert and MIT civilian Robertson Youngquist), where hypergolic propellant was discovered—fuel that burst into flame spontaneously when brought into contact with nitric acid, leading to the use of aniline plus 20% furfuryl alcohol for the 1945 WAC Corporal (the first free-flight rocket to use the fuel). By early 1943, the Truax group had developed a 1,500 lbf (6.7 kN) thrust JATO using hypergolic fuel before the introduction of solid fuel JATO units.

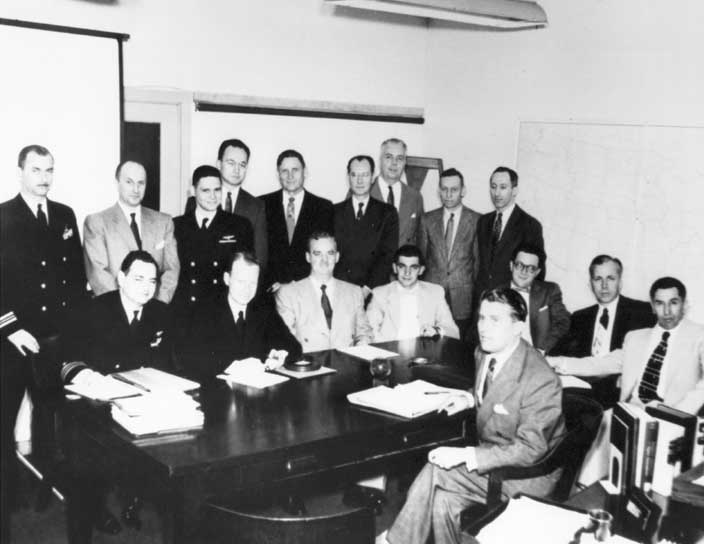
1955 Project Orbiter meeting

From 1955 to 1958, Truax was assigned to the United States Air Force under General Bernard A. Schriever, where Truax and Dr. Adolf Thiel headed the initial design studies and IRBM specifications for the PGM-17 Thor missile. Truax subsequently worked on the Navy's Viking rocket and UGM-27 Polaris missile. Truax studied the sea launching of rockets, such as the Sea Bee and Sea Horse projects. After serving as 1957 American Rocket Society president, Truax retired from the United States Navy in 1959 and headed the Aerojet-General Advanced Development Division and Aerojet's Sea Dragon project.

Truax died from prostate cancer at his home in Valley Center, California on September 17, 2010.

== Truax Engineering ==
In 1966 Robert Truax founded Truax Engineering, which studied sea launch concepts similar to the earlier Sea Dragon—the Excalibur, the SEALAR, and the Excalibur S.

Truax also designed the Skycycle X-2, which he unsuccessfully tested on April 15, 1972, and June 24, 1973, and which Evel Knievel unsuccessfully used at the Snake River Canyon in 1974.

== Volksrocket ==
X-3 Volksrocket
- Type: manned, sub-orbital, single-stage
- Place of origin: United States

Service history
- Used by: never used

Production history
- Manufacturer: Truax Engineering

Specifications
- Engine: 4 Rocketdyne LR101 vernier engines
- Propellant: Liquid oxygen & Jet-A kerosene
- Flight altitude: 50 miles (80 km): burnout at 113,000 feet (34,000 m)
- Guidance system: X-15/Dyna-soar inertial platform

The X-3 Volksrocket (other names: Arriba One, Skycycle X-3) was a reusable space tourism rocket planned by Robert Truax after Evel Knievel provided a $1,000 research grant for a pilot study. Truax was looking for volunteers with enough money to help fund the effort and who wished to fly aboard his rocket. He got thousands of volunteers, but few of them had the financial resources. One person selected to fly in the rocket was engineer Jeana Yeager, who worked for Truax Engineering. Peruvian-born Daniel J. Correa was at one point announced as the first pilot. Among others who offered some financing and who went through some of his training were Ronald Beller, a pilot from Kentucky, Martin Yahn, Ray Upton, and Fell Peters, all of southern California. Ultimately, no one flew in the Volksrocket.

The rocket used surplus components and was tested through 1991.
